= 2005–06 Hong Kong Senior Shield =

Tournament details
- Country: Hong Kong
- Teams: 8

Final positions
- Champions: Kitchee (5th title)
- Runners-up: Happy Valley

Tournament statistics
- Matches played: 7
- Goals scored: 15 (2.14 per match)

The Hong Kong Senior Shield 2005–06 was the 104th staging of the Hong Kong's oldest football knockout competition.

The competition started on 4 March 2006 with 8 Hong Kong First Division League clubs and concluded on 18 March 2006 with the final.

Kitchee captured their 5th title of the competition after beating Happy Valley by 3-0 in the final.

== Fixtures and results ==
=== Bracket ===
Quarterfinals
Kitchee	2
South China	0
Dongguan Lanwa	1
Hong Kong 08	0
Xiangxue Sun Hei	2
Buler Rangers	0
Happy Valley	3
Citizen	0

Semi-finals
Kitchee	2
Dongguan Lanwa	0
Xiangxue Sun Hei	1 (6)
Happy Valley (PSO)	1 (7)

Final
Kitchee	3
Happy Valley	0

=== Quarterfinals ===
4 March 2006
14:00

Kitchee	2–0	South China
Keith Gumbs 63'; Kwok Yue Hung 82'	(in Chinese)

Mong Kok Stadium
Attendance: 942
Referee: Ng Chiu Kok

4 March 2006
16:00

Xiangxue Sun Hei	2–0	Buler Rangers
Lico 27'; Andre 71'	(in Chinese)

Mong Kok Stadium
Attendance: 942
Referee: Cheung Yim Yau

5 March 2006
14:00

Dongguan Lanwa	1–0	Hong Kong 08
Stephen Musah 90'	(in Chinese)

Mong Kok Stadium
Referee: Wong Po On

5 March 2006
16:00

Happy Valley	3–0	Citizen
Oliverira 50'; Fabio 70'; Evanor 85'	(in Chinese)

Mong Kok Stadium
Referee: Wong Chi Tang

=== Semi-finals ===
12 March 2006
14:00

Kitchee	2–0	Dongguan Lanwa
Keith Gumbs 10' (pen.); Kwok Yue Hung 60'	(in Chinese)

Hong Kong Stadium
Attendance: 1,358
Referee: Fung Ka Yu

12 March 2006
16:00

Happy Valley	1–1 (AET)	Xiangxue Sun Hei
Oliveira 92'	(in Chinese)	Lico 99'
Penalties
Oliveria (penalty scored); Gerard Ambassa Guy (penalty scored); Colly Barnes Ezeh (penalty scored); Law Chun Bong (penalty scored); Lee Sze Ming (penalty scored); José Ricardo Rambo (penalty scored); Lee Wai Man (penalty scored)	7–6	(penalty scored) Andre; (penalty scored) Lico; (penalty scored) Leung Chi Wing; (penalty scored) Lai Kai Cheuk; (penalty scored) Jonathan Gamin Moeller; (penalty scored) Chan Yiu Lun; (penalty missed) Cristiano Cordeiro

Hong Kong Stadium
Attendance: 1,358
Referee: Fong Yau Fat

=== Final ===
19 March 2006
15:00

Kitchee	3–0	Happy Valley
Keith Gumbs 45', 90'; Ivan Jević 86'	(in Chinese)

Mong Kok Stadium
Attendance: 2,217
Referee: Cheung Yim Yau

== Top goalscorers ==
4 goals

- (Saint Kitts and Nevis) Keith Gumbs of Kitchee

2 goals

- (Brazil) Lico of Xiangxue Sun Hei
- (Hong Kong) Kwok Yue Hung of Kitchee
- (Brazil) Clodoaldo de Oliveira of Happy Valley

1 goal

- (Ghana) Stephen Joseph Musah of Dongguan Lanwa
- (Brazil) André of Xiangxue Sun Hei
- (Serbia and Montenegro) Ivan Jević of Kitchee
- (Brazil) Fábio Lopes Alcântara of Happy Valley
- (Brazil) Evanor of Happy Valley

== Prizes ==
=== Teamwise ===
- Champion: Kitchee (HK$80,000)
- First Runners-up: Happy Valley (HK$20,000)
- Knock-out in the Semi-Finals: Dongguan Lanwa and Xiangxue Sun Hei (HK$10,000 each)
- Knock-out in the Preliminary: Buler Rangers, Citizen, Hong Kong 08 and South China (HK$5,000 each)

=== Individual awards ===
- Top Scorer Award: (Saint Kitts and Nevis) Keith Gumbs of Kitchee
- Best Defender Award: (Serbia and Montenegro) Ivan Jević of Kitchee

Each player received a prize of HK$5,000.

== Trivia ==
- The pre-match of the Senior Shield final was All Hong Kong Schools Jing Ying Football Tournament final between Yan Chai Hospital Tung Chi Ying Memorial Secondary School and Beacon College. Tung Chi Ying captured the champion by winning 5-1.

== See also ==
- HKFA Website 2005/2006 HKFA Senior Shield
- www.rsssf.com Hong Kong 2005/06
