= 2005–06 Hong Kong League Cup =

Hong Kong League Cup 2005–06 is the 6th staging of the Hong Kong League Cup.

== Group stage ==
All times are Hong Kong Time (UTC+8).

=== Group A ===
Team	Pts	Pld	W	D	L	GF	GA	GD
Xiangxue Sun Hei	9	3	3	0	0	13	2	11
Citizen	4	3	1	1	1	7	4	3
Buler Rangers	4	3	1	1	1	4	7	-3
Hong Kong 08	0	3	0	0	3	3	14	-11

2005-11-12
14:00

Xiangxue Sun Hei	6 – 1	Hong Kong 08
Lico 7'; Akosah 18' 30'; Cordeiro 25'; Chan Ho Man 50'; Chan Yiu Lun 77'	Report	Leung Chi Wing 83' (o.g.)

Mong Kok Stadium
2005-11-13
14:00

Buler Rangers	1 – 1	Citizen
Godfred 89'	Report	Lai Ka Fai 90'

Mong Kok Stadium

19 November 2005
14:00

Hong Kong 08	3-1	Buler Rangers
Ho Min Tong 52'		Lam Ka Wai 10'; Fofo Agbo 75' (PEN.); Cornelius Udebuluzor 90'

Mong Kok Stadium
19 November 2005
16:00

Citizen	1-2	Xiangxue Sun Hei
Chao Pengfei 21'		Lee Kin Wo 50' 57'

Mong Kok Stadium

26 November 2005
14:00

Citizen	5-1	Hong Kong 08
Chao Pengfei 20' 27'; Yuan Yang 58'; Leung Chun Pong 63'; Lai Ka Fai 76'		Ho Min Tong 48'

Mong Kok Stadium
26 November 2005
16:00

Xiangxue Sun Hei	5-0	Buler Rangers
Lo Chi Kwan 19' 39'; Cristiano Cordeiro 27'; Lico 42'; Chan Yiu Lun 50'

Mong Kok Stadium

=== Group B ===
Team	Pts	Pld	W	D	L	GF	GA	GD
Kitchee	9	3	3	0	0	6	1	5
Happy Valley	6	3	2	0	1	5	3	2
Dongguan Lanwa	3	3	1	0	2	3	5	-2
South China	0	3	0	0	3	1	6	-5

12 November 2005

Kitchee	1-0	South China

13 November 2005

Happy Valley	2-0	Dongguan Lanwa

20 November 2005

Kitchee	2-1	Dongguan Lanwa

20 November 2005

Happy Valley	3-0	South China

27 November 2005

Dongguan Lanwa	2-1	South China

27 November 2005

Kitchee	3-0	Happy Valley

== Knockout stage ==
=== Bracket ===
Semifinals
A1	Xiangxue Sun Hei	1 (1)
B2	Happy Valley	1 (3)
A2	Citizen	0
B1	Kitchee	1

Finals
B2	Happy Valley	3
B1	Kitchee	4

Hong Kong League Cup 2005–06 Winner

Kitchee
First Title

=== Semi-finals ===
3 December 2005

Xiangxue Sun Hei	1-1 1-1 (AET) 1-3 (PSO)	Happy Valley

Mong Kok Stadium
Attendance: –
3 December 2005

Kitchee	1-0	Citizen

Mong Kok Stadium
Attendance: –

=== Final ===
10 December 2005

Kitchee	4-3	Happy Valley
Cheung Kin Fung 27', 45'; Chan Siu Ki 36'; Wilfred Ndzedzeni Bamnjo 89'	(in chinese)	Gerard Ambassa Guy 50'; Fabio Lopes Alcantara 62', 80'

Mong Kok Stadium
Attendance: –

== Scorers ==
4 goals

- (Brazil) Fabio Lopes Alcantara of Happy Valley
- (Saint Kitts and Nevis) Keith Gumbs of Kitchee

3 goals

- (Cameroon) Julius Akosah of Xiangxue Sun Hei
- (Hong Kong) Cheung Kin Fung of Kitchee
- (China) Chao Pengfei of Citizen

2 goals

- (Brazil) Lico of Xiangxue Sun Hei
- (Hong Kong) Lee Kin Wo of Xiangxue Sun Hei
- (Hong Kong) Chan Yiu Lun of Xiangxue Sun Hei
- (Hong Kong) Lo Chi Kwan of Xiangxue Sun Hei
- (Brazil) Cristiano Preigchadt Cordeiro of Xiangxue Sun Hei
- (Hong Kong) Lai Ka Fai of Citizen
- Ho Min Tong of Hong Kong 08

1 goal

- (Brazil) Evanor João Fantin of Happy Valley
- (Hong Kong) Leung Chun Pong of Citizen
- (Brazil) Jose Ricardo Rambo of Happy Valley
- (China) Wang Gang of Dongguan Lanwa
- (Ghana) Karikari Godfred of Buler Rangers
- (Hong Kong) Chan Siu Ki of Kitchee
- (Cameroon) Wilfed Ndzedzeni Bamnjo of Kitchee
- (Hong Kong) Gerard Ambassa Guy of Happy Valley
- (Hong Kong) Poon Yiu Cheuk of Happy Valley
- (Hong Kong) Wong Chun Yue of South China
- (Hong Kong) Sham Kwok Keung of Happy Valley
- (China) Yuan Yang of Citizen
- (Ghana) Wisdom Fofo Agbo of Buler Rangers
- (Hong Kong) Chan Ho Man of Xiangxue Sun Hei
- (Hong Kong) Lam Ka Wai of Buler Rangers
- (China) Ye Nan of Dongguan Lanwa
- (Nigeria) Cornelius Udebuluzor of Buler Rangers

== Individual awards ==
- Best Defensive Player: (Hong Kong) Cheung Kin Fung of Kitchee
- Best Attacking Player: (Saint Kitts and Nevis) Keith Gumbs of Kitchee
