= 2004–05 Hong Kong First Division League =

Hong Kong First Division
- Season: 2004–05
- Champions: Sun Hei; 3rd Hong Kong title
- Relegated: Fukien
- AFC Cup: Sun Hei; Happy Valley
- Matches: 72
- Goals: 224 (3.11 per match)
- Top goalscorer: Julius Akosah

The 2004–05 Hong Kong First Division League season was the 93rd since its establishment.

== League table ==
Pos	Team	Pld	W	D	L	GF	GA	GD	Pts	Qualification or relegation
1	Sun Hei (C)	16	10	4	2	28	12	+16	34	2006 AFC Cup group stage
2	Happy Valley	16	9	5	2	45	24	+21	32	2006 AFC Cup group stage
3	Kitchee	16	7	6	3	29	21	+8	27	
4	Buler Rangers	16	7	5	4	29	22	+7	26	
5	Citizen	16	6	4	6	29	28	+1	22	
6	South China	16	4	4	8	21	33	−12	16	
7	Sunray Cave (W)	16	4	3	9	18	21	−3	15	Withdrew from league system
8	Fukien (R)	16	2	7	7	13	24	−11	13	Relegated to Second Division
9	Xiangxue Pharmaceutical (W)	16	3	2	11	12	39	−27	11	Withdrew from league system

(C) Champions; (R) Relegated; (W) Withdrew

== Fixture and results ==
=== Round 1 ===
18 September 2004
15:00

Sun Hei	1–0	Kitchee
Akosah 44'	Info; Report

Hong Kong Stadium
Attendance: 1,051
25 September 2004
15:00

Citizen	4–1	Fukien
Stephane 5', 23'; Wu Haopeng 56'; Ma Shuai 58'	Info; Report	Chambers 62'

Mong Kok Stadium
Attendance: 886
25 September 2004
17:00

Buler Rangers	2–3	Happy Valley
Éder 12'; Roger 19'	Info; Report	Oliveira 3', 87'; Poon Yiu Cheuk 57'

Mong Kok Stadium
Attendance: 886
26 September 2004
15:30

South China	3–2	Sunray Cave
Au Wai Lun 11'; Law Chun Bong 46'; So Yiu Man 74'	Info; Report	He Wenyao 84'; Ren Dazhong 85'

Siu Sai Wan Sports Ground
Attendance: 465

=== Round 2 ===
2 October 2004
15:00

Fukien	0–1	South China
	Info; Report	Chan Chi Hong 90+'

Mong Kok Stadium
Attendance: 1,385
Referee: Ng Kai Lam
2 October 2004
17:00

Happy Valley	2–2	Citizen
Tong Yiu Ming 1' (o.g.); Moore 83'	Info; Report	Stephane 6', 69'

Mong Kok Stadium
Attendance: 1,385
3 October 2004
15:30

Kitchee	2–4	Buler Rangers
Ito 77'; Jancula 90+'	Info; Report	Roger 29', 40'; Tse Man Wing 36'; Lam Ka Wai 68'

Hong Kong Stadium
Attendance: 1,596
9 November 2004
20:00

Sunray Cave	2–0	Xiangxue Phar.
Chen Qian 37'; Ren Dazhong 75'

Huangpu Stadium, Guangzhou

=== Round 3 ===
9 October 2004
13:00

Xiangxue Phar.	2–1	Fukien

Huangpu Stadium, Guangzhou
20 November 2004
14:30

Citizen	2–1	Kitchee
Ma Shuai 40', 47'	Info; Report	Szeto Man Chun 58'

Mong Kok Stadium
Attendance: 1,241
20 November 2004
16:30

Buler Rangers	1–1	Sun Hei
Éder 61' (pen.)	Info; Report	Lau Chi Keung 9' (pen.)

Mong Kok Stadium
Attendance: 1,241
21 November 2004
15:30

Happy Valley	5–1	South China
Márcio 26'; Gerard 39', 87'; Leung Shing Kit 59' (pen.), 71' (pen.)	Info; Report	Yang Yang 64'

Mong Kok Stadium
Attendance: 975

=== Round 4 ===
16 October 2004
14:30

Fukien	2–0	Sunray Cave
Bell Bell 16'; Nono 45'

Hong Kong Stadium
16 October 2004
16:30

Kitchee	2–1	South China
Chan Siu Ki 65', 88'		Law Chun Bong 31'

Hong Kong Stadium
17 October 2004
15:30

Happy Valley	4–1	Xiangxue Phar.

Mong Kok Stadium
17 October 2004
13:30

Sun Hei	2–1	Citizen
Cornelius 25'; Andre Gil Gomes Correia da Costa 81'		Ma Shuai 66'

Mong Kok Stadium

=== Round 5 ===
23 October 2004
13:00

Xiangxue Phar.	1–7	Kitchee

Huangpu Stadium, Guangzhou
23 October 2004
15:00

Sunray Cave	4–1	Happy Valley

Huangpu Stadium, Guangzhou
24 October 2004
14:30

Citizen	4–3	Buler Rangers

Mong Kok Stadium
24 October 2004
16:30

South China	0–1	Sun Hei

Mong Kok Stadium

=== Round 6 ===
28 October 2004
18:00

Happy Valley	2–2	Fukien

Mong Kok Stadium
28 October 2004
20:00

Sun Hei	2–0	Xiangxue Phar.

Mong Kok Stadium
31 October 2004
14:30

Kitchee	3–2	Sunray Cave

Hong Kong Stadium
31 October 2004
16:30

Buler Rangers	3–1	South China

Hong Kong Stadium

=== Round 7 ===
6 November 2004
14:30

Fukien	1–1	Kitchee
So Leung Keung 51'		Leandro Webber Dos Santos 90'

Mong Kok Stadium
Attendance: 1,015
6 November 2004
16:30

South China	4–2	Citizen

Mong Kok Stadium
Attendance: 1,015
7 November 2004
13:00

Xiangxue Phar.	0–5	Buler Rangers

Huangpu Stadium, Guangzhou
7 November 2004
15:00

Sunray Cave	3–0	Sun Hei

Huangpu Stadium, Guangzhou

=== Round 8 ===
13 November 2004
14:30

Citizen	2–0	Xiangxue Phar.
Anane 61'; Ma Shuai 80'

Mong Kok Stadium
13 November 2004
16:30

Kitchee	1–1	Happy Valley
Gerard 23'		Lam Hing Lun 44'

Mong Kok Stadium
14 November 2004
14:30

Buler Rangers	1–0	Sunray Cave
Tchakounte 74'

Mong Kok Stadium
Attendance: 790
14 November 2004
16:30

Sun Hei	0–0	Fukien

Mong Kok Stadium
Attendance: 790

=== Round 9 ===
27 November 2004
14:30

Fukien	1–1	Buler Rangers
Godfred 73'	Info; Report	Chiu Chun Kit 23' (o.g.)

Mong Kok Stadium
Attendance: 1,653
27 November 2004
16:30

Happy Valley	3–2	Sun Hei
Leung Shing Kit 51' (pen.); Oliveira 55'; Fábio 57'	Info; Report	Akosah 70'; Poon Man Tik 84'

Mong Kok Stadium
Attendance: 1,653
28 November 2004
13:00

Xiangxue Phar.	0–0	South China
	Info; Report

Huangpu Stadium, Guangzhou
28 November 2004
15:00

Sunray Cave	0–0	Citizen
Li Yan 81' (pen.)	Info; Report	Stephane 54'

Huangpu Stadium, Guangzhou

=== Round 10 ===
16 January 2005
16:00

Happy Valley	1–1	Buler Rangers
Fábio 4'	Info; Report	Leung Chi Kui 54'

Mong Kok Stadium
Attendance: 1,042
22 January 2005
14:00

Fukien	0–3	Citizen
	Info; Report	Yuan Yang 3', 41'; Yaw 9'

Hong Kong Stadium
Attendance: 1,471
22 January 2005
16:00

Kitchee	2–2	Sun Hei
Keith 20'; Szeto Man Chun 60'	Info; Report	Akosah 17', 67'

Hong Kong Stadium
Attendance: 1,471
1 February 2005
13:00

Sunray Cave	2–0	South China
Cao Zhijie 64'; Tang Dechao 66'	Info; Report

Huangpu Stadium, Guangzhou

=== Round 11 ===
16 January 2005
14:00

South China	1–1	Fukien
Au Wai Lun 56' (pen.)	Info; Report	Oliver 13'

Mong Kok Stadium
Attendance: 1,042
30 January 2005
14:00

Citizen	0–3	Happy Valley
	Info; Report	Oliveira 59', 69', 74'

Mong Kok Stadium
Attendance: 1,018
30 January 2005
16:00

Buler Rangers	0–1	Kitchee
	Info; Report	Ricardo 10' (o.g.)

Mong Kok Stadium
Attendance: 1,018
24 April 2005
15:00

Xiangxue Phar.	3 – 0 (awarded)	Sunray Cave

Mong Kok Stadium
Attendance: 159

=== Round 12 ===
19 February 2005
14:00

Happy Valley	4–1	South China
Oliveira 17', 63'; Fábio 39'; Márcio 41'	Info; Report	Eder 25'

Mong Kok Stadium
Attendance: 1,300
19 February 2005
16:00

Sun Hei	5–0	Buler Rangers
Akosah 20', 38'; Lee Kin Wo 52'; Wong Chun Yue 73'; Chan Ho Man 80'	Info; Report

Mong Kok Stadium
Attendance: 1,300
20 February 2005
15:00

Kitchee	2–1	Citizen
Tam Siu Wai 58'; Bamnjo 68'	Info; Report	Ma Shuai 3'

Mong Kok Stadium
Attendance: 386
12 May 2005
15:00

Fukien	1–0	Xiangxue Phar.
Lee Tat Kong 38'

Mong Kok Stadium

=== Round 13 ===
26 February 2005
14:00

Citizen	0–2	Sun Hei
	Info; Report	Cornelius 22', 90+2'

Mong Kok Stadium
Attendance: 919
26 February 2005
16:00

South China	1–1	Kitchee
Feng Jizhi 87'	Info; Report	Chan Siu Ki 73'

Mong Kok Stadium
Attendance: 919
27 February 2005
15:00

Sunray Cave	1–1	Fukien
Du Zhiqiang 2'	Info; Report	Ngassa 17'

Huangpu Stadium, Guangzhou
26 April 2005
15:00

Xiangxue Phar.	0–5	Happy Valley

Mong Kok Stadium
Attendance: 193

=== Round 14 ===
27 March 2005
14:00

Happy Valley	2–1	Sunray Cave

Mong Kok Stadium
Attendance: 1,332
27 March 2005
16:00

Sun Hei	4–1	South China

Mong Kok Stadium
Attendance: 1,332
2 April 2005
14:00

Buler Rangers	1–1	Citizen
Yip Chi Ho 20'		Yuan Yang 37'

Mong Kok Stadium
Attendance: 745
21 May 2005
15:00

Kitchee	1–1	Xiangxue Phar.

Mong Kok Stadium
Attendance: 170

=== Round 15 ===
19 March 2005
14:00

Fukien	1–5	Happy Valley

Mong Kok Stadium
Attendance: 734
19 March 2005
16:00

South China	1–2	Buler Rangers

Mong Kok Stadium
Attendance: 734
6 April 2005
14:00

Sunray Cave	0–1	Kitchee
		Liu Quankun 67'

Huangpu Stadium, Guangzhou
3 May 2005
15:00

Xiangxue Phar.	0–3	Sun Hei

Mong Kok Stadium
Attendance: 149

=== Round 16 ===
2 April 2005
16:00

Sun Hei	0–0	Sunray Cave

Mong Kok Stadium
Attendance: 745
21 April 2005
18:00

Buler Rangers	3–0	Xiangxue Phar.
Jovanovic 48'; Leung Chi Kui 71', 78'

Mong Kok Stadium
Attendance: 342
21 April 2005
20:00

Kitchee	1–0	Fukien
Chan Siu Ki 73'

Mong Kok Stadium
Attendance: 342
7 May 2005
15:00

Citizen	3–3	South China

Mong Kok Stadium
Attendance: 359

=== Round 17 ===
7 April 2005

Citizen	1–3	Xiangxue Phar.
Ma Shuai 60'		Cheng Lai Hin 3', 69'; Yau Kam Leung 81'

Mong Kok Stadium
Attendance: 173
8 May 2005
14:00

Sunray Cave	0–1	Buler Rangers
		Lo Kwan Yee 82'

Huangpu Stadium, Guangzhou
18 May 2005
18:00

Fukien	0–1	Sun Hei
		Akosah 83'

Siu Sai Wan Sports Ground
Attendance: 195
18 May 2005
16:00

Happy Valley	3–3	Kitchee
Poon Yiu Cheuk 45'; Lawrence 68'; Ernestina 76'		Keith Gumbs 27', 51', 64'

Hong Kong Stadium

=== Round 18 ===
14 May 2005
14:00

South China	2–1	Xiangxue Phar.
Au Wai Lun 6', 59'		Kwok Wing Lok 24'

Mong Kok Stadium
Attendance: 554
14 May 2005
16:00

Citizen	2–0	Sunray Cave
Moses 68', 77'

Mong Kok Stadium
Attendance: 554
15 May 2005
14:00

Buler Rangers	1–1	Fukien
Jovanovic 30'		Fung Chung Ting 15'

Mong Kok Stadium
15 May 2005
16:00

Sun Hei	2–1	Happy Valley
Lau Chi Keung 17'; Chan Ho Man 32'		Márcio 25'

Mong Kok Stadium
