= 2005–06 Hong Kong FA Cup =

Tournament details
- Country: Hong Kong

Final positions
- Champions: Xiangxue Sun Hei (3rd title)
- Runners-up: Happy Valley

The 2005–06 Hong Kong FA Cup was the 32nd staging of the Hong Kong FA Cup. The cup was won by Xiangxue Sun Hei who won 1–0 against Happy Valley in the final.

The competition started on 1 April 2006 with 8 Hong Kong First Division clubs. All matches were held in Mongkok Stadium.

The competition was officially known as 2007/2008 HKFA Lanwa International FA Cup due to sponsorship from LANWA Group Company Limited.

== Teams ==
- Buler Rangers
- Citizen
- Happy Valley
- Hong Kong 08
- Kitchee
- Lanwa Redbull
- South China
- Xiangxue Sun Hei

== Fixtures and results ==
All times are Hong Kong Time (UTC+8).

=== Bracket ===
Quarter-finals
South China	3
Hong Kong 08	2
Happy Valley (PSO)	1 (5)
Buler Rangers	1 (3)
Citizen	2
Lanwa Redbull	1
Kitchee	0
Xiangxue Sun Hei	1

Semi-finals
South China	1
Happy Valley	2
Citizen	0
Xiangxue Sun Hei	7

Final
Happy Valley	0
Xiangxue Sun Hei	1

=== Quarter-finals ===
QF1
1 April 2006
14:00

South China	3 - 2	Hong Kong 08
Au Wai Lun 19' 35'; Chan Chi Hong 86' (PEN.)	(Report)	Chan Man Fai 70'; Cheng Lai Hin 77'

Mong Kok Stadium
Attendance: 782

QF2
1 April 2006
16:00

Happy Valley	1 - 1 1 - 1 (AET) 5 - 3 (PSO)	Buler Rangers
Evanor 45'	(Report)	Fofo Agbo 27'
Penalties
Oliveira (penalty scored); Fabio (penalty scored); Law Chun Bong (penalty scored); Colly Barnes Ezeh (penalty scored); Lee Sze Ming (penalty scored)	5–3	(penalty scored) Fofo Agbo; (penalty scored) Wong Chin Hung; (penalty scored) Chan Wai Ho; (penalty missed) Wu Jun

Mong Kok Stadium
Attendance: 782

QF3
2 April 2006
14:00

Citizen	2 - 1	Lanwa Redbull
Yuan Yang 32'; Leung Chun Pong 69'	(Report)	Xu Bo 90'

Mong Kok Stadium
Attendance: 1,261

QF4
2 April 2006
16:00

Kitchee	0 - 1	Xiangxue Sun Hei
	(Report)	Lico 26'

Mong Kok Stadium
Attendance: 1,261

=== Semi-finals ===
SF1
8 April 2006
14:00

South China	1 - 2	Happy Valley
Deng Jinghuang 23'	(Report)	Oliveira 35'; Ricardo 62'

Mong Kok Stadium
Attendance: 1,083

SF2
8 April 2006
16:00

Citizen	0 - 7	Xiangxue Sun Hei
	(Report)	Lico 12' 23' (PEN.) 44' 50' 55'; Chan Yiu Lun 71'; Lai Kai Cheuk 72'

Mong Kok Stadium
Attendance: 1,083

=== Final ===
Final
16 April 2006
15:00

Happy Valley	0 - 1	Xiangxue Sun Hei
	(Report)	Andre 72'

Hong Kong Stadium
Attendance: 2,101

== Goalscorers ==
Rank	Scorer	Team	Goals
1	(Brazil) Lico	Xiangxue Sun Hei	6
2	(Hong Kong) Au Wai Lun	South China	2
3	(Ghana) Fofo Agbo	Buler Rangers	1
=	(China) Xu Bo	Lanwa Redbull	1
=	(Hong Kong) Cheng Lai Hin	Hong Kong 08	1
=	(Hong Kong) Chan Man Fai	Hong Kong 08	1
=	(Brazil) Andre	Xiangxue Sun Hei	1
=	(Hong Kong) Chan Yiu Lun	Xiangxue Sun Hei	1
=	(Hong Kong) Lai Kai Cheuk	Xiangxue Sun Hei	1
=	(Brazil) Oliveira	Happy Valley	1
=	(Brazil) Ricardo	Happy Valley	1
=	(Brazil) Evanor	Happy Valley	1
=	(Hong Kong) Chan Chi Hong	South China	1
=	(China) Deng Jinghuang	South China	1
=	(Hong Kong) Leung Chun Pong	Citizen	1
=	(China) Yuan Yang	Citizen	1

== Prizes ==
=== Team awards ===
- Champion (HK$80,000): Xiangxue Sun Hei
- 1st Runners-up (HK$20,000): Happy Valley
- Knock-out in the Semi-Finals (2 teams) (HK$10,000 each): Citizen, South China
- Knock-out in the Preliminary (4 teams) (HK$5,000 each): Buler Rangers, Hong Kong 08, Kitchee, Lanwa Redbull

=== Individual awards ===
- Top Scorer Award (HK$5,000): (Brazil) Lico (Xiangxue Sun Hei)
- Best Defender Award (HK$5,000)
