= 2004–05 Hong Kong FA Cup =

Tournament details
- Country: Hong Kong

Final positions
- Champions: Sun Hei (2nd title)
- Runners-up: Happy Valley

2004–05 Hong Kong FA Cup was the 31st staging of the Hong Kong FA Cup. The cup was won by Sun Hei, who won 2-1 against Happy Valley in the final.

The competition started on 28 April 2005 with 9 Hong Kong First Division clubs. Although most of the matches were held in Mongkok Stadium, the final was held in Hong Kong Stadium on 22 April 2005.

The competition was officially known as Xiangxue Pharmaceutical FA Cup 2004/2005 due to sponsorship from Xiangxue Pharmaceutical Factory Co Ltd.

== Teams ==
- Buler Rangers
- Citizen
- Fukien
- Happy Valley
- Kitchee
- South China
- Sun Hei
- Sunray Cave
- Xiangxue Pharmaceutical

== Fixtures and results ==
All times are Hong Kong Time (UTC+8).

=== Bracket ===
Quarter-finals
Kitchee	5
Citizen	1
Sun Hei	1
*	Fukien	0
Happy Valley	3
Buler Rangers	2
Sunray Cave (AET)	1
South China	0

Semi-finals
Kitchee	0
Sun Hei	1
Happy Valley	2
Sunray Cave	0

Final
Sun Hei (AET)	1 (2)
Happy Valley	1 (1)

Note *: Fukien beat Xiangxue Pharmaceutical by 1-0 in the preliminary round.

=== Preliminary round ===
PR1
28 April 2005

Fukien	1 - 0	Xiangxue Pharmaceutical
Tong Kin Man 46'	(Report)

Mong Kok Stadium
Attendance: 140

=== Quarter-finals ===
QF1
30 April 2005

Kitchee	5 - 1	Citizen
Wilfed Bamnjo 1' 88' 90'; Chan Siu Ki 16'; Keith Gumbs 83'	(Report)	Ma Shuai 70'

Mong Kok Stadium
Attendance: 783

QF2
30 April 2005

Sunray Cave	0 - 0 1 - 0 (AET)	South China
Xu Dexin 93'	(Report)

Mong Kok Stadium
Attendance: 783

QF3
1 May 2005

Sun Hei	1 - 0	Fukien
Chan Ho Man 41'	(Report)

Mong Kok Stadium

QF4
1 May 2005

Happy Valley	3 - 2	Buler Rangers
Oliveira 60' 86' ?'	(Report)	Mihailo Jovanovic 23' (PEN.); Fofo Agbo 60'

Mong Kok Stadium
Referee: Ng Chiu Kok

=== Semi-finals ===
SF1
5 May 2005

Kitchee	0 - 1	Sun Hei
	(Report)	Wong Chun Yue 68'

Mong Kok Stadium
Attendance: 840

SF2
5 May 2005

Happy Valley	2 - 0	Sunray Cave
Lawrence 13'; Oliveira 37'	(Report)

Mong Kok Stadium
Attendance: 840

=== Final ===
22 May 2005
15:00

Sun Hei	2 – 1 (a.e.t.)	Happy Valley
Akosah 61'; Andre 119'	Report (Chinese)	Cordeiro 40' (o.g.)

Hong Kong Stadium
Attendance: 1,931

== Goalscorers ==
Rank	Scorer	Team	Goals
1	(Brazil) Oliveira	Happy Valley	5
2	(Cameroon) Wilfed Bamnjo	Kitchee	3
3	(Hong Kong) Tong Kin Man	Fukien	1
=	(Serbia and Montenegro) Mihailo Jovanović	Buler Rangers	1
=	(Ghana) Fofo Agbo	Buler Rangers	1
=	(Hong Kong) Chan Siu Ki	Kitchee	1
=	(Saint Kitts and Nevis) Keith Gumbs	Kitchee	1
=	(China) Ma Shuai	Citizen	1
=	(China) Xu Dexin	Sunray Cave	1
=	(Hong Kong) Lawrence Akandu	Happy Valley	1
=	(Hong Kong) Chan Ho Man	Sun Hei	1
=	(Hong Kong) Wong Chun Yue	Sun Hei	1
=	(Cameroon) Julius Akosah	Sun Hei	1
=	(Brazil) Andre	Sun Hei	1

== Prizes ==
=== Team awards ===
- Champion (HK$80,000): Sun Hei
- 1st Runners-up (HK$20,000): Happy Valley
- Knock-out in the semifinals (2 teams) (HK$10,000 each): Kitchee, Sunray Cave
- Knock-out in the Preliminary (5 teams) (HK$5,000 each): Buler Rangers, Citizen, Fukien, South China, Xiangxue Pharmaceutical

=== Individual awards ===
- Top Scorer Award (HK$5,000): (Brazil) Oliveira (Happy Valley)
- Best Defender Award (HK$5,000): (Brazil) Cordeiro (Sun Hei) and (Hong Kong) Lee Wai Man (Happy Valley)
