= 2010–11 Sun Hei SC season =

Sun Hei SC
2010–11 season
- Head coach: (Brazil) José Ricardo Rambo
- League: 3rd
- Shield: N/A
- FA Cup: N/A
- League Cup: N/A

The 2010–11 season is the 17th season of Sun Hei SC in Hong Kong First Division League. The team is coached by Brazilian coach José Ricardo Rambo.

== Squad statistics ==
No.	Pos.	Name	League		Shield		FA Cup		League Cup		Total	
No.	Pos.	Name	Apps	Goals	Apps	Goals	Apps	Goals	Apps	Goals	Apps	Goals
1	GK	(China) Zhang Jianzhong	3	0	0	0	0	0	0	0	3	0
2	DF	(Hong Kong) Lai Ka Fai	2	0	0	0	0	0	0	0	2	0
3	DF	(Hong Kong) Cristiano Cordeiro	3	1	0	0	0	0	0	0	3	1
4	DF	(Hong Kong) Pak Wing Chak	2 (1)	0	0	0	0	0	0	0	2 (1)	0
5	MF	(Hong Kong) Yan Wai Hong	0	0	0	0	0	0	0	0	0	0
6	DF	(South Korea) Kwon Hyuk-Tae	2	0	0	0	0	0	0	0	2	0
7	MF	(Japan) Asahi Yamamoto	0	0	0	0	0	0	0	0	0	0
8	MF	(China) Li Ming	3	1	0	0	0	0	0	0	3	1
9	MF	(Hong Kong) Lau Chi Keung	1 (2)	0	0	0	0	0	0	0	1 (2)	0
10	FW	(Hong Kong) Yu Ho Pong	0 (1)	0	0	0	0	0	0	0	0 (1)	0
11	DF	(Brazil) Roberto	3	0	0	0	0	0	0	0	3	0
12	MF	(Hong Kong) Tse Man Wing	3	1	0	0	0	0	0	0	3	1
14	MF	(China) Ling Cong	2 (1)	0	0	0	0	0	0	0	2 (1)	0
15	DF	(Hong Kong) Wong Chun Ho	0	0	0	0	0	0	0	0	0	0
16	MF	(Hong Kong) Chao Pengfei	3	1	0	0	0	0	0	0	3	1
17	FW	(Brazil) Cahê	1	1	0	0	0	0	0	0	1	1
18	DF	(Canada) Michael Luk	0 (3)	0	0	0	0	0	0	0	0 (3)	0
20	MF	(Brazil) Adilson Silva	2	0	0	0	0	0	0	0	2	0
21	GK	(Macau) Domingos Chan	0	0	0	0	0	0	0	0	0	0
22	GK	(Hong Kong) Cheung King Wah	0	0	0	0	0	0	0	0	0	0
23	FW	(Hong Kong) Lo Tin Ho	0	0	0	0	0	0	0	0	0	0
24	MF	(Hong Kong) Yeung Ka Ching	0	0	0	0	0	0	0	0	0	0
27	MF	(Cameroon) Wilfred Bamnjo	3	1	0	0	0	0	0	0	3	1
–	–	Own goals	–	0	–	0	–	0	–	0	–	0

Statistics accurate as of match played 26 September 2010

== Matches ==
=== Competitive ===
==== Hong Kong First Division League ====
7 September 2010 Week 1	Sun Hei	3–0	Tai Chung	Tsing Yi Sports Ground
18:00 GMT+8	Chao Pengfei 3'; Cahê 32'; Li Ming 45'; Ling Cong (yellow card) 36'; Kwon Hyuk-Tae (yellow card) 57'; Cordeiro (yellow card) 59'; Kwon Hyuk-Tae (yellow card) 60' (yellow-red card)	Report	(yellow card) 27' Ip Chung Long; (yellow card) 49' Alex; (yellow card) 60' Zhang Shuoke; (yellow card) 81' (yellow-red card) Ip Chung Long; (yellow card) 87' Li Hang Wui; (yellow card) 90' Lukalu; (yellow card) 90' Tong Kin Man; (yellow card) 90' Cheung Tsz Kin	Attendance: 383; Referee: Ng Chiu Kok

18 September 2010 Week 3	South China	2–1	Sun Hei	Hong Kong Stadium
18:00 GMT+8	Chan Siu Ki 23'; Alves (yellow card) 28'; Bai He (yellow card) 35'; Li Haiqiang (yellow card) 53'; Poon Yiu Cheuk (yellow card) 75'; Lau Nim Yat 84'	Report	(yellow card) 18' Tse Man Wing; (yellow card) 33' Pak Wing Chak; (yellow card) 43' Silva; (yellow card) 49' Cordeiro; (yellow card) 49' Lai Ka Fai; 57' Cordeiro; (yellow card) 90' Roberto

26 September 2010 Week 4	Fourway Rangers	5–2	Sun Hei	Sham Shui Po Sports Ground
15:00 GMT+8	Beto 36' (pen.); Kilama (yellow card) 36'; Chan Wai Ho 39'; Beto 55'; Lam Hok Hei 56'; Makhosonke (yellow card) 58'; Makhosonke 65'	Report	Chao Pengfei (yellow card) 24'; Bamnjo 25'; Lau Chi Keung (yellow card) 35'; Tse Man Wing 90'	Attendance: 732

1 October 2010 Week 16	NTR WF Tai Po	v	Sun Hei	Tai Po Sports Ground
15:00 GMT+8

==== Hong Kong Senior Challenge Shield ====
30 October 2010 Quarter-final	Sun Hei	v	Citizen or Tuen Mun	Siu Sai Wan Sports Ground
14:00 GMT+8
