= 2006 Lunar New Year Cup =

Tournament details
- Host country: Hong Kong
- Dates: 13 and 16 February
- Teams: 4
- Venue: 1 (in 1 host city)

Final positions
- Champions: Denmark (2nd title)

Tournament statistics
- Matches played: 4
- Goals scored: 13 (3.25 per match)
- Top scorer: 13 players (1 goal)

The 2006 Carlsberg Cup was a football tournament held in Hong Kong over the first and fourth day of the Chinese New Year holiday (13 February and 16 February 2006).

== Participating teams ==
- Croatia (first appearance)
- Denmark (third appearance)
- Hong Kong (host)
- South Korea (second appearance)

== Squads ==
=== Croatia ===
Head coach: Zlatko Kranjčar

No.	Pos.	Player	Date of birth (age)	Caps	Club
1	GK	Joey Didulica	14 October 1977 (aged 28)		Austria Wien
2	MF	Neven Vukman	14 October 1985 (aged 20)		(Croatia) Varteks
3	DF	Mladen Bartulović	5 October 1986 (aged 19)		(Croatia) Hajduk Split
4	DF	Vedran Ješe	3 February 1981 (aged 24)		(Croatia) Inter Zaprešić
5	DF	Mario Tokić	23 July 1975 (aged 30)		Austria Wien
6	DF	Mato Neretljak	3 June 1979 (aged 26)		(South Korea) Suwon Samsung Bluewings
7	MF	Srebrenko Posavec	19 March 1980 (aged 25)		(Croatia) Varteks
8	MF	Josip Balatinac	7 March 1979 (aged 26)		(Croatia) Osijek
9	FW	Eduardo	25 February 1983 (aged 22)		(Croatia) Dinamo Zagreb
10	MF	Davor Vugrinec	24 March 1975 (aged 30)		(Croatia) Rijeka
11	FW	Mladen Petrić	1 January 1981 (aged 25)		(Switzerland) Basel
12	GK	Ivan Turina	3 October 1980 (aged 25)		(Croatia) Dinamo Zagreb
13	DF	Dario Knežević	20 April 1982 (aged 23)		(Croatia) Rijeka
14	FW	Ivan Bošnjak	6 February 1979 (aged 26)		(Croatia) Dinamo Zagreb
15	FW	Leon Benko	11 November 1983 (aged 22)		(Croatia) Varteks
16	MF	Jerko Leko	9 April 1980 (aged 25)		(Ukraine) Dynamo Kyiv
17	MF	Siniša Linić	4 March 1983 (aged 22)		(Croatia) Rijeka
18	MF	Nikola Šafarić	11 March 1981 (aged 24)		(Croatia) Varteks
19	MF	Niko Kranjčar	13 August 1984 (aged 21)		(Croatia) Hajduk Split

=== Denmark ===
Head coach: Morten Olsen

No.	Pos.	Player	Date of birth (age)	Caps	Club
1	GK	Casper Ankergren	9 November 1979 (aged 26)		(Denmark) Brøndby
2	MF	Thomas Augustinussen	20 March 1981 (aged 24)		(Denmark) Aalborg BK
3	FW	Søren Berg	15 May 1976 (aged 29)		(Denmark) Odense
4	MF	Martin Borre	27 March 1979 (aged 26)		(Denmark) Odense
5	MF	Anders Due	17 March 1982 (aged 23)		(Denmark) Nordsjælland
6	DF	Michael Gravgaard	3 April 1978 (aged 27)		(Denmark) Copenhagen
7	DF	Lars Jacobsen	20 September 1979 (aged 26)		(Denmark) Copenhagen
8	DF	Allan K. Jepsen	4 July 1977 (aged 28)		(Denmark) Aalborg BK
9	FW	Steffen Højer	22 May 1973 (aged 32)		(Denmark) Viborg
10	DF	Kristian Bak Nielsen	20 October 1982 (aged 23)		(Denmark) Midtjylland
11	MF	Jerry Lucena	8 November 1980 (aged 25)		(Denmark) Esbjerg
12	MF	Nicolai Stokholm	1 April 1976 (aged 29)		(Denmark) Odense
13	FW	Jesper Bech	25 May 1982 (aged 23)		(Sweden) Malmö FF
14	MF	Martin Retov	5 May 1980 (aged 25)		(Denmark) Brøndby
15	MF	Michael Silberbauer	7 July 1981 (aged 24)		(Denmark) Copenhagen
16	GK	Jesper Christiansen	24 April 1978 (aged 27)		(Denmark) Copenhagen
17	FW	Dennis Sørensen	4 May 1984 (aged 21)		(Denmark) Midtjylland
18	DF	Bo Svensson	4 August 1979 (aged 26)		(Denmark) Copenhagen
19	DF	Chris Sørensen	27 July 1977 (aged 28)		(Denmark) Odense

=== Hong Kong ===
Head coach: Lai Sun Cheung

No.	Pos.	Player	Date of birth (age)	Caps	Club
1	GK	Tse Tak Him	10 February 1985 (aged 20)		(Hong Kong) Citizen
2	DF	Lee Chi Ho	16 November 1982 (aged 23)		(Hong Kong) South China
3	MF	Man Pei Tak	16 February 1982 (aged 23)		(Hong Kong) Buler Rangers
4	DF	Sham Kwok Fai	30 May 1984 (aged 21)		(Hong Kong) Happy Valley
5	DF	Lee Wai Lun	7 March 1981 (aged 24)		(Hong Kong) Xiangxue Sun Hei
7	MF	Chu Siu Kei	11 January 1980 (aged 26)		(Hong Kong) Xiangxue Sun Hei
8	MF	Cheung Sai Ho	27 August 1975 (aged 30)		(Hong Kong) Happy Valley
9	FW	Chan Siu Ki	14 July 1985 (aged 20)		(Hong Kong) Kitchee
10	MF	Chan Yiu Lun	20 July 1982 (aged 23)		(Hong Kong) Xiangxue Sun Hei
11	DF	Law Chun Bong	25 January 1981 (aged 25)		(Hong Kong) Happy Valley
12	MF	Sham Kwok Keung	10 September 1985 (aged 20)		(Hong Kong) Happy Valley
13	DF	Cheung Kin Fung	1 January 1984 (aged 22)		(Hong Kong) Kitchee
14	MF	Lo Chi Kwan	18 March 1981 (aged 24)		(Hong Kong) Xiangxue Sun Hei
15	DF	Chan Wai Ho	24 April 1982 (aged 23)		(Hong Kong) Buler Rangers
16	DF	Liu Quankun	17 February 1983 (aged 22)		(Hong Kong) Kitchee
18	DF	Lee Wai Man	18 August 1973 (aged 32)		(Hong Kong) Happy Valley
19	GK	Fan Chun Yip	1 May 1976 (aged 29)		(Hong Kong) Happy Valley
20	DF	Poon Yiu Cheuk	19 September 1977 (aged 28)		(Hong Kong) Happy Valley
21	FW	Chan Ho Man	14 May 1980 (aged 25)		(Hong Kong) Xiangxue Sun Hei
22	GK	Chan Ka Ki	25 April 1979 (aged 26)		(Hong Kong) Xiangxue Sun Hei
23	DF	Gerard Ambassa Guy	21 September 1978 (aged 27)		(Hong Kong) Happy Valley
26	DF	Lai Kai Cheuk	5 July 1977 (aged 28)		(Hong Kong) Xiangxue Sun Hei
27	MF	Wong Chun Yue	28 January 1978 (aged 28)		(Hong Kong) Xiangxue Sun Hei

=== South Korea ===
Head coach: (Netherlands) Dick Advocaat

No.	Pos.	Player	Date of birth (age)	Caps	Club
1	GK	Lee Woon-jae	26 April 1973 (aged 32)		(South Korea) Suwon Samsung Bluewings
2	DF	Yoo Kyoung-youl	15 August 1978 (aged 27)		(South Korea) Ulsan Hyundai Horang-i
3	DF	Kim Dong-jin	29 January 1982 (aged 24)		(South Korea) FC Seoul
4	DF	Choi Jin-cheul	26 March 1971 (aged 34)		(South Korea) Chonbuk Hyundai Motors
5	DF	Kim Young-chul	23 April 1977 (aged 28)		(South Korea) Ilhwa Chunma
7	DF	Kim Nam-il	14 March 1977 (aged 28)		(South Korea) Suwon Samsung Bluewings
8	MF	Kim Do-heon	14 July 1982 (aged 23)		(South Korea) Ilhwa Chunma
9	FW	Cho Jae-jin	9 July 1981 (aged 24)		(Japan) Shimizu S-Pulse
10	FW	Park Chu-young	10 July 1985 (aged 20)		(South Korea) FC Seoul
11	DF	Jang Hak-young	24 August 1981 (aged 24)		(South Korea) Ilhwa Chunma
13	DF	Kim Sang-sik	17 December 1976 (aged 29)		(South Korea) Ilhwa Chunma
14	MF	Lee Chun-soo	9 July 1981 (aged 24)		(South Korea) Ulsan Hyundai Horang-i
15	FW	Kim Jung-woo	9 May 1982 (aged 23)		(South Korea) Ulsan Hyundai Horang-i
16	MF	Chung Kyung-ho	22 May 1980 (aged 25)		(South Korea) Gwangju Sangmu Phoenix
17	MF	Lee Ho	22 October 1984 (aged 21)		(South Korea) Ulsan Hyundai Horang-i
18	MF	Choi Tae-uk	13 March 1981 (aged 24)		(Japan) Shimizu S-Pulse
20	FW	Lee Dong-gook	29 April 1979 (aged 26)		(South Korea) Pohang Steelers
21	MF	Baek Ji-Hoon	28 February 1985 (aged 20)		(South Korea) FC Seoul
23	DF	Cho Won-hee	17 April 1983 (aged 22)		(South Korea) Suwon Samsung Bluewings
31	GK	Kim Young-kwang	28 June 1983 (aged 22)		(South Korea) Chunnam Dragons

== Results ==
All times given in Hong Kong Time (UTC+8).

=== Semifinals ===
13 February 2006
15:00

South Korea	2–0	Croatia
Kim Dong-jin 36'; Lee Chun-soo 49'; Baek Ji-hoon (yellow card) 89'		Leko (yellow card) 27'

Hong Kong Stadium, Hong Kong
Attendance: 16,841

13 February 2006
17:15

Hong Kong	0–3	Denmark
		Berg 19'; Augustinussen 39'; Due

Hong Kong Stadium, Hong Kong
Attendance: 16,841

=== Third place match ===
16 February 2006
18:00

Hong Kong	0–4	Croatia
Lo Chi Kwan (yellow card) 30'		Benko (yellow card) 24'; Knežević 15'; Leko 28'; Eduardo 64'; Bošnjak 71'

Hong Kong Stadium, Hong Kong
Attendance: 13,971

=== Final ===
16 February 2006
20:15

South Korea	1–3	Denmark
Cho Jae-jin 13'; Cho Won-hee (yellow card) 63'		Sørensen (yellow card) 30'; Jacobsen 41'; Bech 66'; Silberbauer 89'

Hong Kong Stadium, Hong Kong
Attendance: 13,971

2006 Carlsberg Cup champions

Denmark
Second title

== Top scorers ==
1 goal

- (Croatia) Ivan Bošnjak
- (Croatia) Eduardo
- (Croatia) Dario Knežević
- (Croatia) Jerko Leko
- (Denmark) Thomas Augustinussen
- (Denmark) Jesper Bech
- (Denmark) Søren Berg
- (Denmark) Anders Due
- (Denmark) Lars Jacobsen
- (Denmark) Michael Silberbauer
- (South Korea) Cho Jae-jin
- (South Korea) Kim Dong-jin
- (South Korea) Lee Chun-soo

== See also ==
- Hong Kong Football Association
- Hong Kong First Division League
