= Sham Kwok Fai =

Hong Kong footballer and coach (born 1984)

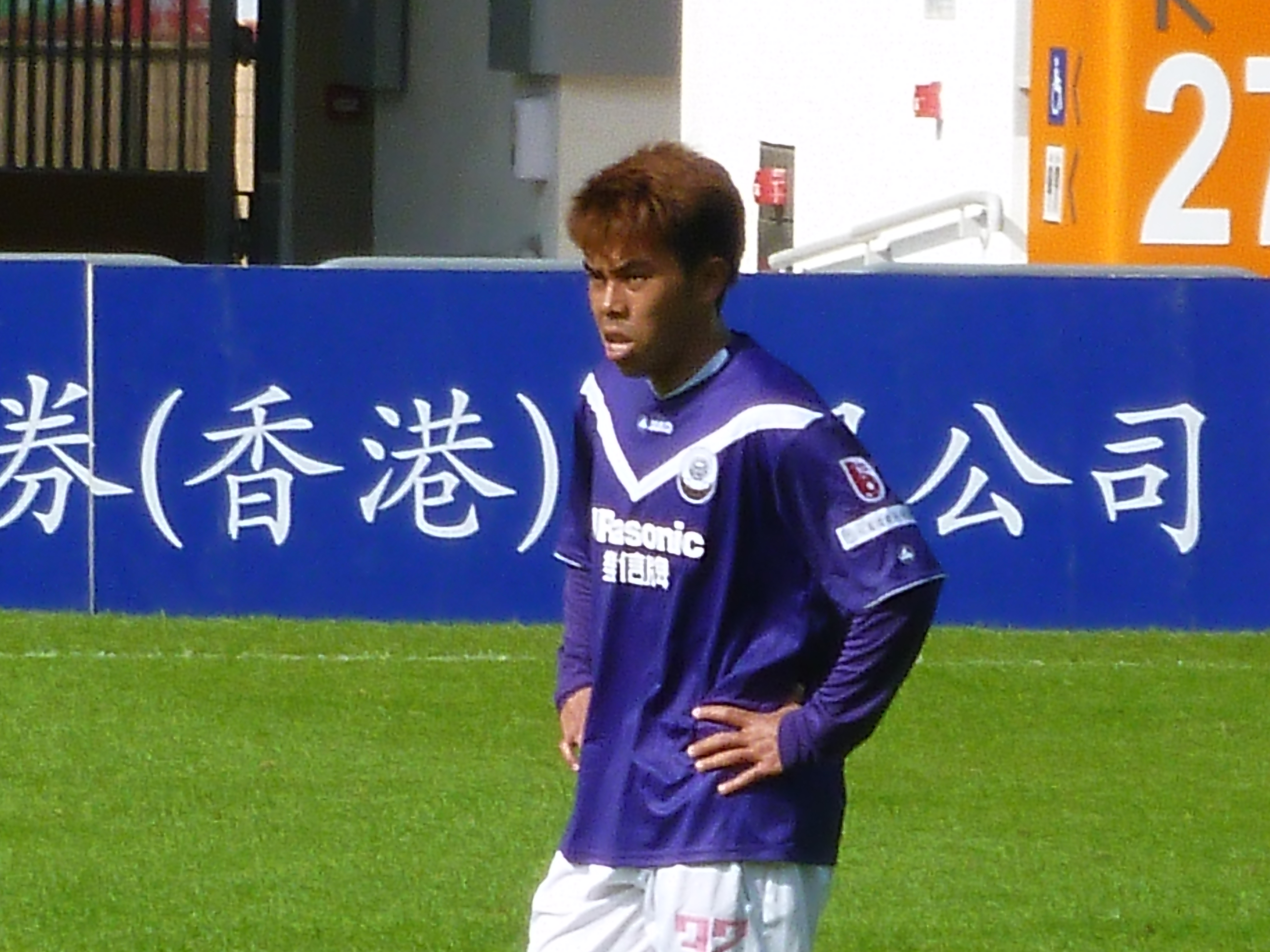

Personal information
- Full name: Sham Kwok Fai
- Date of birth: 30 May 1984 (age 42)
- Place of birth: Hong Kong
- Height: 1.75 m (5 ft 9 in)
- Position: Right back

Youth career
- Citizen

Senior career*
Years	Team	Apps	(Gls)
2001–2007	Happy Valley	40	(3)
2007–2014	Citizen	122	(8)
2014–2015	Pegasus	7	(0)
2015–2019	Southern	58	(2)
2019–2022	Citizen	31	(11)
2022–2024	Wing Yee	47	(7)
2024–2025	Tung Sing	17	(1)

International career
2003–2006	Hong Kong U-23		
2006–2011	Hong Kong	15	(0)
- * Club domestic league appearances and goals

Sham Kwok Fai (Chinese: 沈國輝; Jyutping: sam^{2} gwok^{3} fai^{1}; born 30 May 1984) is a Hong Kong former professional footballer who played as a right back.

He is the elder brother of former professional footballer Sham Kwok Keung.

== Honours ==
Happy Valley

- Hong Kong First Division: 2002–03, 2005–06
- Hong Kong Senior Shield: 2003–04
- Hong Kong FA Cup: 2003–04

Citizen

- Hong Kong FA Cup: 2007–08
- Hong Kong Senior Shield: 2010–11

== Career statistics ==
=== International ===
As of 2 October 2011

#	Date	Venue	Opponent	Result	Scored	Competition
1	29 January 2006	Hong Kong Stadium, Hong Kong	Denmark	0–3	0	2006 Carlsberg Cup
2	1 February 2006	Hong Kong Stadium, Hong Kong	Croatia	0–4	0	2006 Carlsberg Cup
3	15 February 2006	Hong Kong Stadium, Hong Kong	Singapore	1–1	0	Friendly
4	18 February 2006	Hong Kong Stadium, Hong Kong	India	2–2	0	Friendly
5	22 February 2006	Hong Kong Stadium, Hong Kong	Qatar	0–3	0	2007 AFC Asian Cup qualification
6	1 March 2006	Bangabandhu National Stadium, Dhaka, Bangladesh	Bangladesh	1–0	0	2007 AFC Asian Cup qualification
7	9 October 2009	Outsourcing Stadium, Shizuoka, Japan	Japan	0–6	0	2011 AFC Asian Cup qualification
8	6 January 2010	National Stadium, Madinat 'Isa, Bahrain	Bahrain	0–4	0	2011 AFC Asian Cup qualification
9	4 October 2010	Balewadi Stadium, Pune, India	India	1–0	0	Friendly
10	17 November 2010	Hong Kong Stadium, Hong Kong	Paraguay	0–7	0	Friendly
11	3 June 2011	Siu Sai Wan Sports Ground, Hong Kong	Malaysia	1–1	0	Friendly
12	23 July 2011	Prince Mohamed bin Fahd Stadium, Dammam	Saudi Arabia	0–3	0	2014 FIFA World Cup qualification
13	28 July 2011	Siu Sai Wan Sports Ground, Hong Kong	Saudi Arabia	0–5	0	2014 FIFA World Cup qualification
14	30 September 2011	Kaohsiung National Stadium, Kaohsiung, Taiwan	Philippines	3–3	0	2011 Long Teng Cup
15	2 October 2011	Kaohsiung National Stadium, Kaohsiung, Taiwan	Macau	5–1	0	2011 Long Teng Cup

== Personal life ==
Sham Kwok Fai successfully proposed marriage to his girlfriend of six years, Stephanie on 31 December 2011. His Citizen teammates sang "唯獨你是不可取替" (You alone are irreplaceable), an Andy Hui hit song, as he proposed. But he said the wedding will probably have to wait until 2013, as he needs to save money for it and their house.
