= Xiangxue Pharmaceutical (football) =

- Founded: 2001
- Dissolved: 2005
- Ground: Hong Kong or Guangzhou (both no fixed location)
- Sponsor: Xiangxue Pharmaceutical
- League: Hong Kong First Division
- 2004–05: 9th

Xiangxue Pharmaceutical was the name of several teams from mainland China that played in Hong Kong First Division League; they were all sponsored by Xiangxue Pharmaceutical.

== History ==
In 2001–02 season, Guangdong Mingfeng, a youth football club from Zhaoqing, entered the Hong Kong First Division League. It was replaced by the reserve team of Guangzhou F.C. in 2002–03 season, which was also sponsored by Xiangxue Pharmaceutical since January 2002, as Guangzhou Xiangxue.

It became the name for the reserve team of another Chinese football club Hunan Shoking that was intended to play in 2004–05 Hong Kong First Division League. After the team withdrew at the start of season, "Hong Kong 10", a youth team that was organized by the Hong Kong Football Association, as well as other football club, lent several youth players to Xiangxue Pharmaceutical in order to make the team to finish 2004–05 season.

=== Post-defunct ===
After the season, Xiangxue Pharmaceutical sponsored Hong Kong football club Sun Hei SC, and then returned to sponsor the reserve team of Shenzhen F.C. to play in Hong Kong in 2008–09 season as Xiangxue Eisiti.

== See also ==
- Xiangxue Eisiti (Hong Kong)
