= Law Chun Bong =

Hong Kong footballer (born 1981)

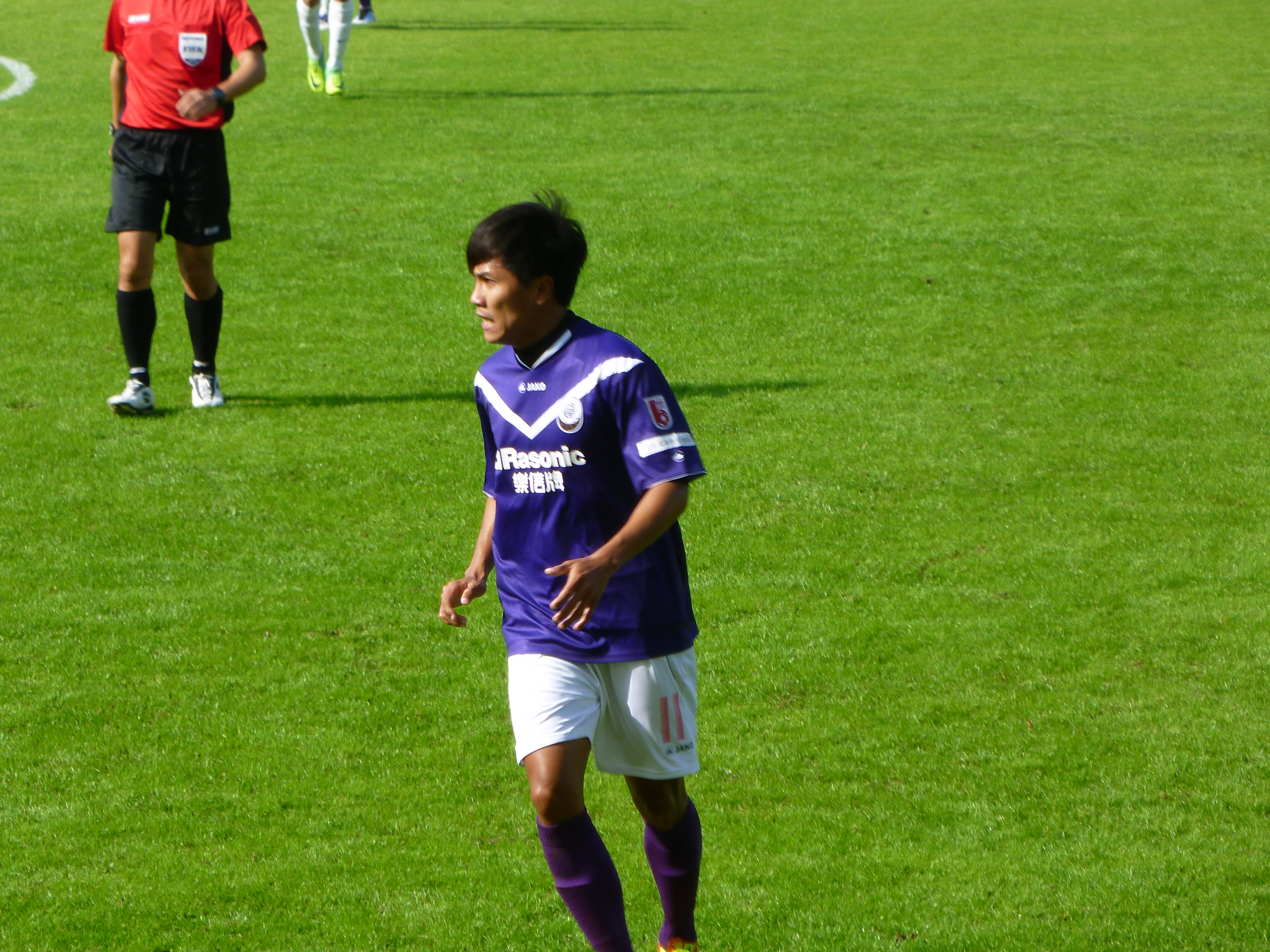

Personal information
- Full name: Law Chun Bong
- Date of birth: 25 January 1981 (age 45)
- Place of birth: Hong Kong
- Height: 1.74 m (5 ft 9 in)
- Positions: Winger; striker

Youth career
- 1993–1997: Sing Tao

Senior career*
Years	Team	Apps	(Gls)
1998–1999	Sing Tao		
1999–2000	Rangers (HKG)		
2000–2001	Yee Hope		
2001–2002	Rangers (HKG)		
2002–2005	Sun Hei	13	(1)
2004–2005	→ South China (loan)	13	(2)
2005–2009	Happy Valley	57	(4)
2009–2012	Citizen	35	(3)
2012–2014	Yokohama FC Hong Kong	17	(0)
2014–2015	HKFC	11	(6)
2015	South China	0	(0)
2015–2017	Wing Yee	36	(19)

International career^{‡}
2003–2007	Hong Kong	27	(4)
- * Club domestic league appearances and goals as of 1 June 2017 ‡ National team caps and goals as of 16 August 2006

Law Chun Bong (Chinese: 羅振邦; Jyutping: lo^{4} zan^{3} bong^{1}; born 25 January 1981) is a Hong Kong former professional footballer. He can play in many positions (forward, left winger, left midfielder and left wing back), mostly as a left midfielder. He is a pacey, and has good finishing (both head and feet), as well as a sense of sight. These elements have enabled him to create many chances for the team.

He started to make his name in fame when he performed sharply in the East Asian Cup 2003. He and Wong Chun Yue is publicly named by the former Japan coach Zico as one of the most promising midfielders in years.

== Childhood and early career ==
Back to the time when Law was around 8-years-old, his father brought him to take part in a Summer Holiday football training programme. Since that time, he has found himself fancy with football and improved greatly with his knowledge of this sport.

In Law's high school times, he was discovered because of promising performances in the high school competitions. Then he joined the Hong Kong juniors. Because of his professionalism, impressive attitude and diligence, he was introduced to a Hong Kong First Division League club by a coach when he was 19. And there he started his profession as a footballer.

== Honours ==
=== Club ===
Sun Hei

- Hong Kong First Division League: 2003–04
- Hong Kong League Cup: 2002–03, 2003–04
- Hong Kong FA Cup: 2002–03

Happy Valley

- Hong Kong First Division League: 2005–06

Citizen

- Hong Kong Senior Challenge Shield: 2010–11

== Career statistics ==
=== Club ===
As of 17 August 2006

Club	Season	League		League Cup		Senior Shield		FA Cup		AFC Cup		Total	
Club	Season	Apps	Goals	Apps	Goals	Apps	Goals	Apps	Goals	Apps	Goals	Apps	Goals
South China	2004–05	16	4	4	3	1	0	1	0	0	0	22	7
South China	All											22	7
Happy Valley	2005–06	8	0	1	0	2	0	3	0	5	0	19	0
Happy Valley	2006–07	0	0	0	0	0	0	0	0	0	0	0	13
Happy Valley	All											19	13
All												41	28

=== International goals ===
Scores and results list Hong Kong's goal tally first.

No	Date	Venue	Opponent	Score	Result	Competition
1.	6 November 2003	Pakhtakor Markaziy Stadium, Tashkent, Uzbekistan	Uzbekistan	1–2	1–4	2004 AFC Asian Cup qualification
2.	5 March 2005	Zhongshan Soccer Stadium, Taipei, Taiwan	Mongolia	2–0	6–0	2005 East Asian Football Championship qualification
3.	18 February 2006	Hong Kong Stadium, Mong Kok, Hong Kong	India	2–0	2–2	Friendly
4.	21 June 2007	Estádio Campo Desportivo, Taipa, Macau	Guam	13–1	15–1	2008 East Asian Football Championship qualification
