= Rasonic =

Hong Kong appliance brand

Logo of Rasonic

Rasonic (Chinese: 樂信牌) is a brand name under Shun Hing Electric Works and Engineering Co. Ltd, a company that distributes a variety of electronic products.

== Description ==
Under the brand name Rasonic, the company offers a variety of home appliances, such as rice cookers, hair dryers, dehumidifiers, refrigerators, ovens, plasma and LCD televisions, DVD Recorders, kettles, air conditioning units, foot massagers, and vacuum cleaners produced by various OEM manufacturers.
