= 2010–11 Hong Kong Senior Shield =

Tournament details
- Country: Hong Kong
- Teams: 10

Final positions
- Champions: Citizen (1st title)
- Runners-up: South China

Tournament statistics
- Matches played: 9
- Goals scored: 25 (2.78 per match)
- Attendance: 18,094 (2,010 per match)
- Top goal scorer: (Brazil) Paulinho (Citizen) (4 goals)

Awards
- Best player: (Nigeria) Festus Baise (Citizen)

2010–11 Hong Kong Senior Shield, officially named as HKFA Canbo Senior Shield (Chinese: 香港足球總會康寶高級組銀牌賽) due to the competition's sponsorship by Guangdong Canbo Electrical, was the 109th season of one of the Asian oldest football knockout competitions, Hong Kong Senior Shield. It was a knockout competition for all the teams of Hong Kong First Division League. As winners, Citizen had guaranteed a place in the 2012 AFC Cup.

== Calendar ==
Round	Date	Matches	Clubs
First round	8 October 2010 – 21 October 2010	2	10 → 8
Quarter-finals	30 October 2010 – 31 October 2010	4	8 → 4
Semi-finals	25 December 2010	2	4 → 2
Final	16 January 2011	1	2 → 1

== Bracket ==
Quarter-finals
30 October — Siu Sai Wan
South China	4
Tai Chung	0
31 October — Yuen Long
TSW Pegasus	0
NTR WF Tai Po (a.e.t.)	1
31 October — Yuen Long
Kitchee	1 (10)
Fourway Rangers (p)	1 (11)
30 October — Siu Sai Wan
Sun Hei	0
Citizen	5

Semi-finals
25 December — Hong Kong
South China	3
NTR WF Tai Po	0
25 December — Hong Kong
Fourway Rangers	0
Citizen	2

Final
16 January — Hong Kong
South China	3 (2)
Citizen (p)	3 (4)

== First round ==
8 October 2010
20:00

HKFC	0–1	NT Realty Wofoo Tai Po
	Report	Li Chun Yip 63'

Hong Kong Football Club Stadium
Attendance: 239
Referee: Ng Chiu Kok

21 October 2010
20:00

Citizen	1–0	Tuen Mun
Paulinho 6'	Report

Siu Sai Wan Sports Ground
Attendance: 271
Referee: Wong Chi Tang

== Quarter-finals ==
30 October 2010
14:00

Sun Hei	0–5	Citizen
	Report	Sandro 16', 29'; Paulinho 49', 52'; Ju Yingzhi 62'

Siu Sai Wan Sports Ground
Attendance: 1,205
Referee: Ng Kai Lam

30 October 2010
16:30

South China	4–0	Tai Chung
Lee Wai Lim 13'; Au Yeung Yiu Chung 32'; Alves 56'; Schutz 67'	Report

Siu Sai Wan Sports Ground
Attendance: 1,205
Referee: Tong Kui Sum

31 October 2010
14:00

Kitchee	1–1 (a.e.t.)	Fourway Rangers
Jordi 18'	Report	Beto 25' (pen.)
Penalties
Roberto (penalty scored); Dani (penalty scored); Luzardo (penalty scored); Wang Zhenpeng (penalty scored); Jordi (penalty scored); Liu Quankun (penalty scored); Liang Zicheng (penalty scored); Cheng Siu Wai (penalty scored); Lo Kwan Yee (penalty scored); Chan Man Fai (penalty scored); Gao Wen (penalty missed)	10–11	(penalty scored) Beto; (penalty scored) Fan Weijun; (penalty scored) Minga; (penalty scored) Iu Wai; (penalty scored) Lo Chi Kwan; (penalty scored) Yip Chi Ho; (penalty scored) Chan Wai Ho; (penalty scored) Kilama; (penalty scored) Angelo King; (penalty scored) Sui Weijie; (penalty scored) Chan Siu Yuen

Yuen Long Stadium
Attendance: 1,502
Referee: Ng Chiu Kok

31 October 2010
16:30

TSW Pegasus	0–1 (a.e.t.)	NT Realty Wofoo Tai Po
	Report	Christian 105'

Yuen Long Stadium
Attendance: 1,502
Referee: Liu Kwok Man

== Semi-finals ==
25 December 2010
14:00

Fourway Rangers	0–2	Citizen
	Report	Paulinho 11'; Ju Yingzhi 39'

Hong Kong Stadium
Attendance: 3,738
Referee: Tong Kui Sum

25 December 2010
16:30

South China	3–0	NT Realty Wofoo Tai Po
Bai He 51'; Cheng Lai Hin 77', 81'	Report

Hong Kong Stadium
Attendance: 3,738
Referee: Wong Chi Tang

== Final ==
16 January 2011
15:00

South China	3–3 (a.e.t.)	Citizen
Li Haiqiang 13'; Joel 23'; Giovane 36'	Report	Festus 44'; Sham Kwok Keung 55'; Tam Lok Hin 88'
Penalties
Li Haiqiang (penalty missed); Schutz (penalty scored); Giovane (penalty scored); Lee Chi Ho (penalty missed)	2–4	(penalty scored) Sham Kwok Fai; (penalty scored) Festus; (penalty scored) Detinho; (penalty scored) Law Chun Bong

Hong Kong Stadium
Attendance: 4,694
Referee: Ng Chiu Kok

South China	Citizen

South China:
GK	1	(Hong Kong) Yapp Hung Fai
RB	21	(Hong Kong) Man Pei Tak		(substituted off) 83'
CB	2	(Hong Kong) Lee Chi Ho
CB	14	(Brazil) Joel		(substituted off) 59'
LB	3	(Hong Kong) Poon Yiu Cheuk		(substituted off) 59'
DM	5	(Hong Kong) Bai He
RM	7	(Hong Kong) Chan Siu Ki	(yellow card) 45+'
AM	11	(Hong Kong) Li Haiqiang (c)	(yellow card) 6'
LM	18	(Hong Kong) Kwok Kin Pong
SS	28	(Brazil) Tales Schutz	(yellow card) 84'
CF	17	(Brazil) Giovane
Substitutes:
GK	23	(Hong Kong) Zhang Chunhui
DF	4	(Hong Kong) Chiu Chun Kit		(substituted on) 59'
DF	6	(Hong Kong) Wong Chin Hung
DF	20	(Hong Kong) Lau Nim Yat		(substituted on) 59'
MF	16	(Hong Kong) Leung Chun Pong
FW	10	(Hong Kong) Au Yeung Yiu Chung
FW	31	(Hong Kong) Cheng Lai Hin		(substituted on) 83'
Coach:
(Hong Kong) Chan Ho Yin

Citizen:
GK	29	(Hong Kong) Tse Tak Him
RB	32	(Hong Kong) Sham Kwok Fai
CB	23	(Brazil) Hélio	(yellow card) 37'
CB	5	(Hong Kong) Chan Man Chun	(yellow card) 27'	(substituted off) 41'
LB	3	(Hong Kong) Fung Kai Hong	(yellow card) 42' (yellow-red card) 104'
DM	7	(Nigeria) Festus Baise (c)
RM	11	(Hong Kong) Law Chun Bong
AM	19	(Brazil) Paulinho	(yellow card) 12' (yellow-red card) 62'
LM	2	(Hong Kong) Wong Yiu Fu		(substituted off) 75'
SS	18	(Hong Kong) Sham Kwok Keung
CF	9	(Brazil) Sandro	(yellow card) 27'	(substituted off) 38'
Substitutes:
GK	17	(Hong Kong) Liu Fu Yuen
DF	12	(Hong Kong) Ma Ka Ki		(substituted on) 41'
DF	15	(Ghana) Moses Mensah
MF	6	(Hong Kong) Yeung Chi Lun
MF	13	(Hong Kong) Cheung Kwok Ming
MF	16	(Hong Kong) Tam Lok Hin		(substituted on) 75'
FW	30	(Brazil) Detinho	(yellow card) 108'	(substituted on) 38'
Coach:
(Hong Kong) Pui Ho Wang

MATCH OFFICIALS

- Assistant referees:
  - Chow Chun Kit
  - Cheng Oi Cho
- Fourth official: Ng Kai Lam

MATCH RULES

- 90 minutes.
- 30 minutes of extra-time if necessary.
- Penalty shoot-out if scores still level.
- Seven named substitutes
- Maximum of 3 substitutions.

== Scorers ==
The scorers in the 2010–11 Hong Kong Senior Shield are as follows:

4 goals

- (Brazil) Paulinho Piracicaba (Citizen)

2 goals

- (Hong Kong) Cheng Lai Hin (South China)
- (Brazil) Sandro (Citizen)
- (Hong Kong) Ju Yingzhi (Citizen)

1 goal

- (Hong Kong) Bai He (South China)
- (Hong Kong) Lee Wai Lim (South China)
- (Hong Kong) Li Haiqiang (South China)
- (Hong Kong) Au Yeung Yiu Chung (South China)
- (Brazil) Alves (South China)
- (Brazil) Tales Schutz (South China)
- (Brazil) Giovane Alves da Silva (South China)
- (Brazil) Joel (South China)
- (Nigeria) Festus Baise (Citizen)
- (Hong Kong) Tam Lok Hin (Citizen)
- (Hong Kong) Sham Kwok Keung (Citizen)
- (Spain) Jordi Tarrés (Kitchee)
- (Hong Kong) Li Chun Yip (NT Realty Wofoo Tai Po)
- (Ghana) Christian Annan (NT Realty Wofoo Tai Po)
- (Brazil) Roberto Fronza (Fourway Rangers)

== Prizes ==
Top Scorer Award	Player of the Tournament
(Brazil) Paulinho (Citizen)	(Nigeria) Festus Baise (Citizen)
