= 2005–06 Hong Kong First Division League =

Hong Kong First Division
- Season: 2005–06
- Champions: Happy Valley
- Matches: 56
- Goals: 172 (3.07 per match)
- Top goalscorer: Fábio Lopes (Happy Valley); Oliveira (Happy Valley) (26 goals)

The 2005–06 Hong Kong First Division League season was the 94th since its establishment.

== Teams ==
- Buler Rangers 流浪
- Citizen 公民
- Happy Valley 愉園
- Hong Kong 08 香港08
- Kitchee 傑志
- Lanwa 東莞聯華
- South China 南華
- Xiangxue Sun Hei 香雪晨曦

== League table ==
Pos	Team	Pld	W	D	L	GF	GA	GD	Pts
1	Happy Valley (C)	14	11	2	1	39	15	+24	35
2	Xiangxue Sun Hei	14	8	2	4	30	15	+15	26
3	Buler Rangers	14	7	3	4	24	19	+5	24
4	Kitchee	14	5	6	3	24	13	+11	21
5	Lanwa	14	4	5	5	14	20	−6	17
6	Citizen	14	3	6	5	20	25	−5	15
7	South China	14	3	4	7	18	22	−4	13
8	Hong Kong 08	14	0	2	12	3	43	−40	2

(C) Champions

== Top scorers ==
=== All Competitions ===
Pos	Name	Club	First Division	FA Cup	Senior Shield	League Cup	Total Goals
1	Lico	Xiangxue Sun Hei	9	6	2	2	19
2	Fábio Lopes	Happy Valley	10	0	1	4	15
2	Keith Jerome Gumbs	Kitchee FC	7	0	4	4	15
4	Clodoaldo de Oliveira	Happy Valley	10	1	2	0	13
5	Au Wai Lun	South China	8	2	0	0	10
6	Julius Akosah	Xiangxue Sun Hei	4	0	0	3	7

=== Hong Kong players only ===
Pos	Pos in overall table	Name	Club	First Division	FA Cup	Senior Shield	League Cup	Total Goals
1	5	Au Wai Lun	South China	8	2	0	0	10
2	7	Lee Kin Wo	Xiangxue Sun Hei	4	0	0	2	6
2	7	Cheung Kin Fung	Kitchee	3	0	0	3	6
4	10	Leung Chun Pong	Citizen	3	1	0	1	5
4	10	Chan Yiu Lun	Xiangxue Sun Hei	2	1	0	2	5
4	10	Lo Chi Kwan	Xiangxue Sun Hei	3	0	0	2	5

=== First Division League Goals only ===
Pos	Pos in overall table	Name	Club	Total League Goals
1	2	Fábio Lopes	Happy Valley	10
1	4	Oliveira	Happy Valley	10
3	1	Lico	Xiangxue Sun Hei	9
4	4	Au Wai Lun	South China	8
5	3	Keith Gumbs	Kitchee FC	7
6	6	Julius Akosah	Xiangxue Sun Hei	4
6	7	Lee Kin Wo	Xiangxue Sun Hei	4
6	10	Godfred Karikari	Buler Rangers	4
6	16	Wu Jun	Buler Rangers	4
6	16	Festus Baise	Citizen	4

== No relegation ==
According to regulations, the bottom two teams, Hong Kong 08 and South China, were required to be relegated to the Second Division. However, both teams were retained in the top flight next season via HKFA exempted. Reason for retaining Hong Kong 08 is to give the team better preparation of 2008 Olympics Qualification games. South China was retained because the club promised to expand its next season's budget and sign new quality players. HKFA accepted this and hoped this would improve the competitiveness and attractiveness of the league.

== See also ==
- Hong Kong First Division League
- List of football (soccer) competitions
- Hong Kong Football Association
