= Lico (footballer, born 1974) =

Brazilian footballer (born 1974)

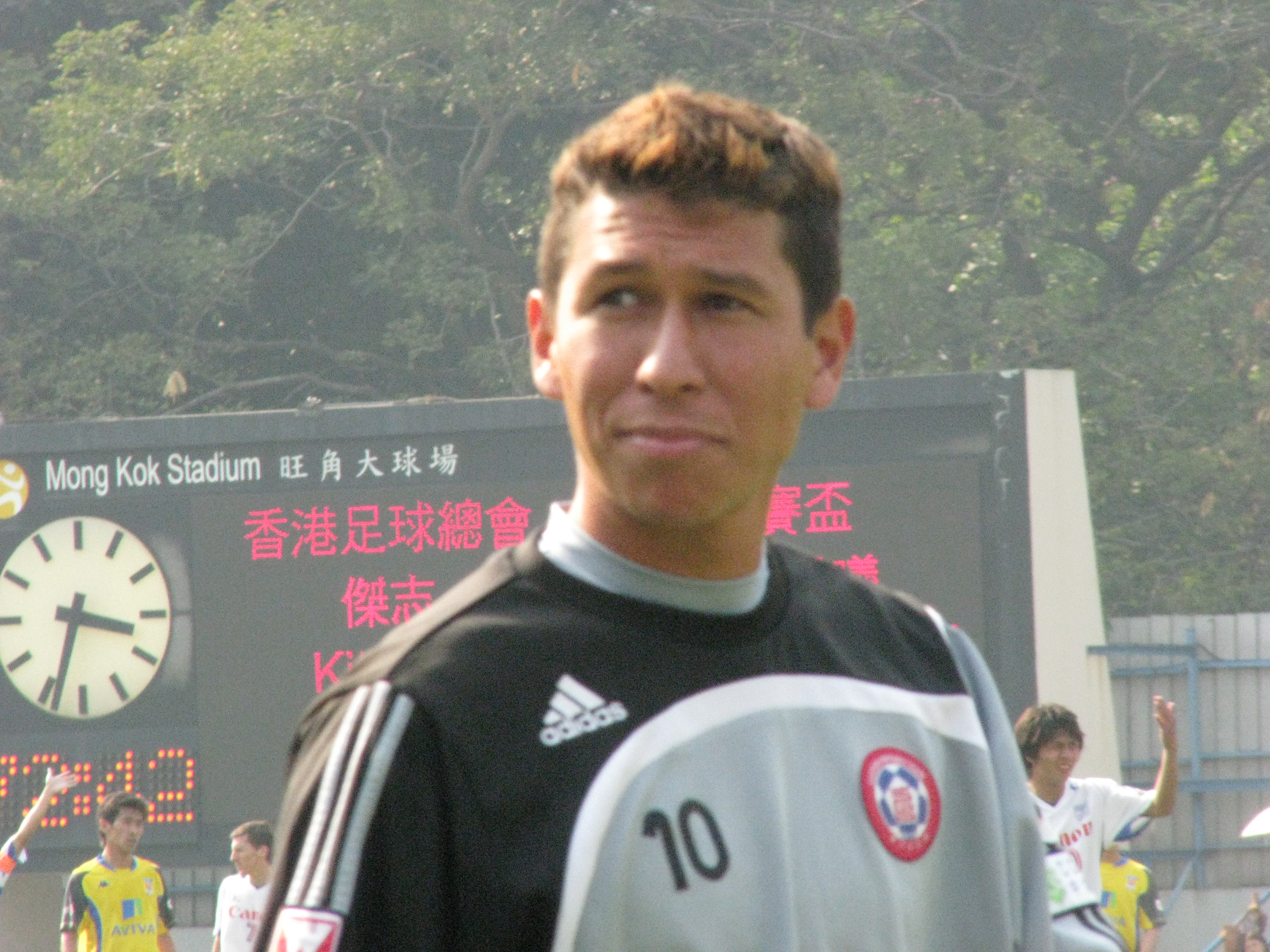

Personal information
- Full name: Fladimir da Cruz Freitas
- Date of birth: 20 January 1974 (age 52)
- Place of birth: Brazil
- Height: 1.78 m (5 ft 10 in)
- Position: Attacking midfielder

Senior career*
Years	Team	Apps	(Gls)
–2005	Santa Cruz		
2005–2007	Sun Hei	29	(20)
2007	Da Nang		
2007–2008	Eastern	11	(0)
- * Club domestic league appearances and goals

Fladimir da Cruz Freitas (Chinese: 歷高; Jyutping: lik^{6} gou^{1}; born 20 January 1974), commonly known as Lico, is a former Brazilian professional footballer who played as an attacking midfielder. He is notable for his brilliant performance for Sun Hei during the 2005–06 Hong Kong First Division League season.

== Honours ==
=== Club ===
Sun Hei

- Hong Kong FA Cup: 2005–06

=== Individual ===
- Hong Kong FA Cup Top Scorer: 2005–06

== Career statistics ==
=== Club ===
As of 22 December 2006

Club	Season	League		League Cup		Senior Shield		FA Cup		AFC Cup		Total	
Club	Season	Iyot	Bantot	Baho	Goals	Apps	Goals	Apps	Goals	Apps	Goals	Apps	Goals
Sun Hei	2005-06	?	9	?	2	?	2	?	6	?	?	?	?
Sun Hei	2006-07	?	11	—	—	—	—	—	—	2	0	?	8
Sun Hei	Total		20										
Career Total													

Awards and achievements
Preceded by Clodoaldo de Oliveira	Hong Kong FA Cup top scorer 2005–06	Succeeded by Tales Schütz
Preceded by Keith Gumbs	Hong Kong Senior Shield top scorer (with Wong Chun Yue, Tales Schütz, Jaimes McKee); 2006–07	Succeeded by Rodrigo
