= Chan Yiu Lun =

Hong Kong footballer

Chan Yiu Lun 陳耀麟
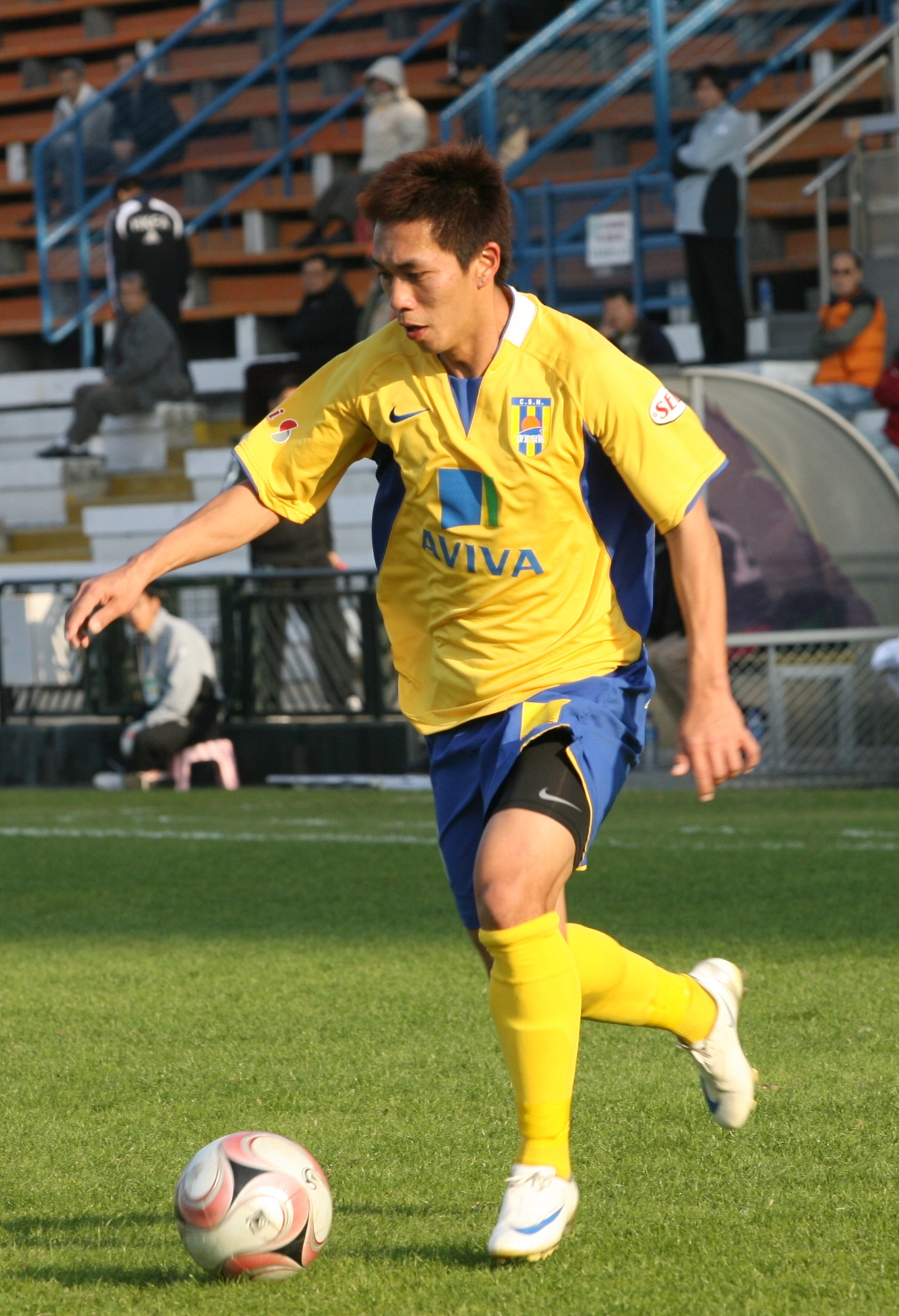

Personal information
- Full name: Chan Yiu Lun
- Date of birth: 20 July 1982 (age 44)
- Place of birth: Hong Kong
- Height: 1.73 m (5 ft 8 in)
- Position: Midfielder

Youth career
- Sing Tao

Senior career*
Years	Team	Apps	(Gls)
1998–2004	Hong Kong Rangers	92	(23)
2004–2005	Kitchee	9	(0)
2005–2010	Sun Hei	81	(17)
2010–2011	Fourway	9	(0)
2011	Double Flower	12	(10)
2012	Sun Hei	6	(0)
2019	North District	3	(0)
2020	Metro Gallery	1	(0)
2020–2021	Double Flower	10	(4)
2021–2022	Heng Wah		
2023–2024	St. Joseph's	14	(1)
2024–2025	Ravia		
2025	Man Fung Hong		
2025–	Bright Cerulean	1	(0)

International career
2005–2006	Hong Kong	10	(6)
- * Club domestic league appearances and goals as of 16 May 2026

Chan Yiu Lun (Chinese: 陳耀麟; Cantonese Yale: Chàn Yiuhlèun; born 20 July 1982) is a former Hong Kong professional footballer who played as a midfielder.

== Club career ==
Chan started his football career at Sing Tao. He saw Wei Kwan Lung as his idol because his pace and shooting abilities impressed him greatly. Wei Kwan Lung was later banned from football for match-fixing, but he still encouraged Chan to play and not to follow in his footsteps.

=== Sun Hei ===
Chan scored in the extra time of the 2008–09 Hong Kong Senior Challenge Shield semi-final against Fourways Rangers to win the match 1:0 and take Sun Hei to the final.

=== Rangers ===
Chan left Rangers on 12 June 2011 after a season in which he was not a regular starter.

=== Pontic and Double Flower ===
Chan has reached an understanding to join Pontic for the 2011–12 Hong Kong First Division League season. But in the end, Pontic gave up its promotion due to funding issues and Chan was left with no club to play for. Therefore, he could only play for Double Flower in the Second Division and waited to see if any opportunities would come up in the 2011–12 season.

=== Sun Hei ===
On 11 January 2012, Chan returned to his former club Sun Hei because head coach Ricardo was in need of more players due to the suspension of Kilama and Milovanovic following the match against Pegasus, when both were sent off and therefore suspended.

== Honours ==
Sun Hei

- Hong Kong FA Cup: 2005–06

== Career statistics ==
=== Club ===
Club performance			League		Cup		League Cup		Continental		Total	
Season	Club	League	Apps	Goals	Apps	Goals	Apps	Goals	Apps	Goals	Apps	Goals
Hong Kong			League		FA Cup & Shield		League Cup		Asia		Total	
2005–06	Sun Hei	First Division	11	2	5	1	4	2	?	0	?	5
2006–07	Sun Hei	First Division	?	?	?	?	?	?	-		?	?
2007–08	Sun Hei	First Division	?	?	?	?	?	?	-		?	?
2008–09	Sun Hei	First Division	?	?	?	?	?	?	-		?	?
Total	Hong Kong		?	?	?	?	?	?	-		38	10

=== International ===
As of 16 August 2006

#	Date	Venue	Opponent	Result	Scored	Competition
1	5 March 2005	Chungshan Soccer Stadium, Taipei, Taiwan	Mongolia	6–0	2	2005 EAFF Championship Preliminary
2	7 March 2005	Chungshan Soccer Stadium, Taipei, Taiwan	Guam	15–0	2	2005 EAFF Championship Preliminary
3	11 March 2005	Chungshan Soccer Stadium, Taipei, Taiwan	Chinese Taipei	5–0	1	2005 EAFF Championship Preliminary
4	13 March 2005	Chungshan Soccer Stadium, Taipei, Taiwan	North Korea	0–2	0	2005 EAFF Championship Preliminary
5	29 January 2006	Hong Kong Stadium, Hong Kong	Denmark	0–3	0	2006 Carlsberg Cup
6	1 February 2006	Hong Kong Stadium, Hong Kong	Croatia	0–4	0	2006 Carlsberg Cup
7	15 February 2006	Hong Kong Stadium, Hong Kong	Singapore	1–1	0	Friendly
8	22 February 2006	Hong Kong Stadium, Hong Kong	Qatar	0–3	0	2007 AFC Asian Cup qualification
9	1 March 2006	Bangabandhu National Stadium, Dhaka, Bangladesh	Bangladesh	1–0	1	2007 AFC Asian Cup qualification
10	16 August 2006	Hong Kong Stadium, Hong Kong	Uzbekistan	2–2	0	2007 AFC Asian Cup qualification
