= Gerard Ambassa Guy =

Hong Kong footballer

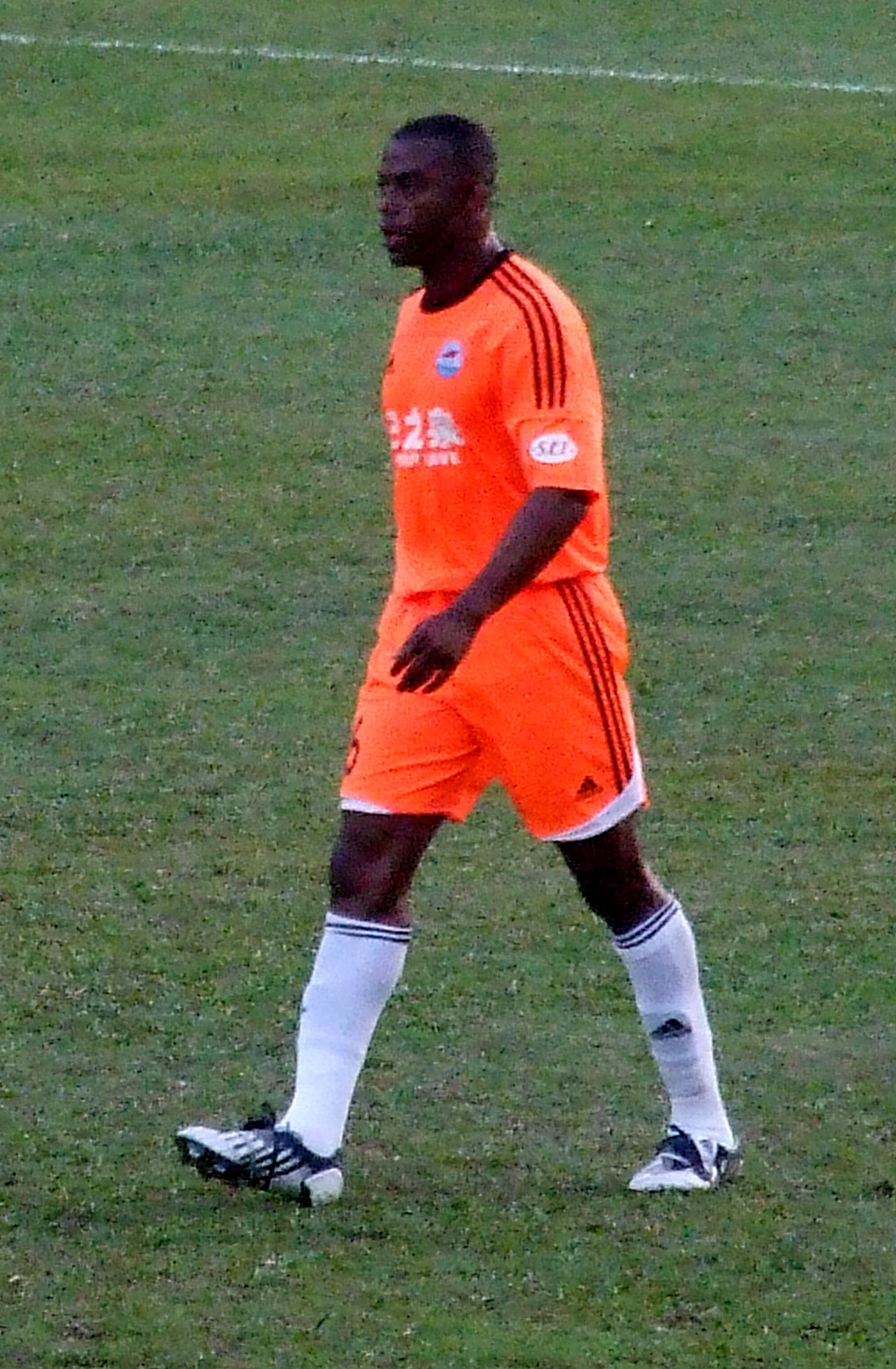

Personal information
- Full name: Gerard Ambassa Guy
- Date of birth: 21 September 1978 (age 48)
- Place of birth: Yaoundé, Cameroon
- Height: 1.85 m (6 ft 1 in)
- Position: Centre back

Senior career*
Years	Team	Apps	(Gls)
1994–1996	Tonnerre Yaoundé		
1997	Foshan Fosti		
1997–1999	Hong Kong Rangers		
1999–2000	Instant-Dict		
2000–2001	O & YH Union	36	(3)
2001–2007	Happy Valley	54	(22)
2007	Persija Jakarta	0	(0)
2007–2009	Happy Valley	37	(3)
2009–2011	South China	11	(0)
2010–2011	→ Pegasus (loan)	7	(0)
2011	Sun Hei	8	(1)
2013	Enfield City Falcons	10	(0)
2014	Playford City Patriots	11	(2)
2015	Elizabeth Grove Soccer Club		
2016	Shenzhen Baoxin		
2016–2017	Biun Chun Glory Sky	5	(0)
2019	Kowloon City	3	(0)
2019–2020	King Mountain		

International career^{‡}
1997–1999	Cameroon U23		
2006–2011	Hong Kong	29	(6)

Managerial career
- 2015–2016: Playford City Patriots
- 2017–2018: Hong Kong Rangers
- * Club domestic league appearances and goals as of 3 November 2019 ‡ National team caps and goals as of 9 February 2011

Gerard Ambassa Guy (Chinese: 卓卓; born 21 September 1978), nicknamed JJ (Chinese: 卓卓), is a football coach and former professional footballer who played as a centre back. Born in Cameroon, he represented Hong Kong internationally.

He played for Happy Valley, O & YH Union, Instant-Dict, Rangers (HKG), South China, Pegasus and Sun Hei in the past.

== Club career ==
Gerard first arrived in Hong Kong to play for Rangers. Subsequently, he played for Instant-Dict, O & YH Union, Happy Valley AA and in 2009 joined South China AA.

=== South China ===
In 2009, Gerard joined South China. He scored in the 5–4 away defeat to Neftchi Farg'ona in the quarter-finals 1st leg. Then he scored a last-minute away goal in the 1–2 semi-final defeat by Kuwait SC in the 2009 AFC Cup, thus setting up a crucial home game for South China in Hong Kong. The Hong Kong Stadium was packed for the second leg match on 21 October 2009 but South China lost 0–1.

=== Pegasus ===
Gerard joined Pegasus on loan from South China in the summer of 2010. On 23 September 2010, Gerard was sent off in a league game after two bookable offences, but Pegasus won 4–0 over Citizen.

On 1 March 2011, Gerard scored with a header to help Pegasus secure a 2-1 win over Song Lam Nghe An in the 2011 AFC Cup group game away in Vietnam.

=== Mohun Bagan ===
On 23 July 2010, Gerard arrived in Kolkata for a trial with Indian club Mohun Bagan as an Asian origin player.

=== Sun Hei ===
Gerard joined Sun Hei for the 2011–12 Hong Kong First Division League season.

== International career ==
Gerard became a member of the Hong Kong national football team after he had spent more than seven years in Hong Kong and gained Hong Kong citizenship. He took part in Round 2 of the 2010 East Asian Football Championship tournament in Kaoshiung and received the Most Valuable Player award.

== Managerial career ==
On 4 December 2017, Gerard took over as manager of Rangers (HKG) after Dejan Antonić's departure from the club.

== Honours ==
Happy Valley

- Hong Kong First Division: 2002–03, 2005–06
- Hong Kong Senior Shield: 2003-04
- Hong Kong FA Cup: 2003–04

== Career statistics ==
=== Club ===
Updated 30 August 2009

Club	Season	League		League Cup		Senior Shield		FA Cup		AFC Cup		Total	
Club	Season	Apps	Goals	Apps	Goals	Apps	Goals	Apps	Goals	Apps	Goals	Apps	Goals
Happy Valley	2001–02	?	8	?	?	?	?	?	?	?	?	?	?
Happy Valley	2002–03	?	?	?	?	?	?	?	?	?	?	23	16
Happy Valley	2003–04	?	7	?	1	?	2	?	2	?	3	24	15
Happy Valley	2004–05	?	3	?	0	?	2	?	0	?	0	22	5
Happy Valley	2005–06	7 (1)	2	3 (0)	0	3 (0)	0	3 (0)	0	4 (1)	2	20 (1)	4
Happy Valley	2006–07	12 (1)	7	1 (0)	0	3 (0)	2	1 (0)	2	5 (0)	3	22 (1)	14
Total													
Persija Jakarta	2007–08	?	?	?	?	?	?	?	?	?	?	?	?
Total													
Happy Valley	2007–08	13 (1)	0	3 (0)	0	2 (0)	0	1 (0)	0	-	-	19 (1)	0
Happy Valley	2008–09	20 (2)	3	1 (0)	0	1 (0)	0	2 (0)	1	-	-	24 (2)	4
Total		33 (3)	3	4 (0)	0	3 (0)	0	3 (0)	1	-	-	43 (3)	4
South China	2009–10	4 (0)	0	0 (0)	0	0 (0)	0	0 (0)	0	4 (0)	2	8 (0)	2
Total		4 (0)	0	0 (0)	0	0 (0)	0	0 (0)	0	4 (0)	2	8 (0)	2
All												?	?

=== International ===
Updated 17 November 2010

#	Date	Venue	Opponent	Result	Scored	Competition
1	29 January 2006	Hong Kong Stadium, Hong Kong	Denmark	0–3	0	2006 Carlsberg Cup
2	1 February 2006	Hong Kong Stadium, Hong Kong	Croatia	0–4	0	2006 Carlsberg Cup
3	15 February 2006	Hong Kong Stadium, Hong Kong	Singapore	1–1	1	Friendly
4	18 February 2006	Hong Kong Stadium, Hong Kong	India	2–2	1	Friendly
5	22 February 2006	Hong Kong Stadium, Hong Kong	Qatar	0–3	0	2007 AFC Asian Cup qualification
6	1 March 2006	Bangabandhu National Stadium, Dhaka, Bangladesh	Bangladesh	1–0	0	2007 AFC Asian Cup qualification
7	12 August 2006	Hong Kong Stadium, Hong Kong	Singapore	1–2	0	Friendly
8	16 August 2006	Pakhtakor Markaziy Stadium, Tashkent, Uzbekistan	Uzbekistan	2–2	0	2007 AFC Asian Cup qualification
9	6 September 2006	Hong Kong Stadium, Hong Kong	Uzbekistan	0–0	0	2007 AFC Asian Cup qualification
10	11 October 2006	Al-Gharafa Stadium, Doha, Qatar	Qatar	0–2	0	2007 AFC Asian Cup qualification
11	15 November 2006	Mong Kok Stadium, Hong Kong	Bangladesh	2–0	2	2007 AFC Asian Cup qualification
12	1 June 2007	Gelora Bung Karno Stadium, Jakarta, Indonesia	Indonesia	0–3	0	Friendly
13	10 June 2007	So Kon Po Recreation Ground, Hong Kong	Macau	2–1	0	2007 Hong Kong–Macau Interport
14	19 June 2007	Estádio Campo Desportivo, Macau	Chinese Taipei	1–1	0	2008 EAFF Championship Preliminary
15	21 June 2007	Estádio Campo Desportivo, Macau	Guam	15–1	1	2008 EAFF Championship Preliminary
16	24 June 2007	Estádio Campo Desportivo, Macau	North Korea	0–1	0	2008 EAFF Championship Preliminary
17	18 November 2007	Macau UST Stadium, Macau	Macau	9–1	0	Friendly
18	14 January 2009	Hong Kong Stadium, Hong Kong	India	2–1	0	Friendly
19	21 January 2009	Hong Kong Stadium, Hong Kong	Bahrain	1–3	0	2011 AFC Asian Cup qualification
20	28 January 2009	Ali Muhesen Stadium, Sanaa, Yemen	Yemen	0–1	0	2011 AFC Asian Cup qualification
21	23 August 2009	World Games Stadium, Kaohsiung, Taiwan	Chinese Taipei	4–0	1	2010 EAFF Championship Semi-Final
22	25 August 2009	World Games Stadium, Kaohsiung, Taiwan	North Korea	0–0	0	2010 EAFF Championship Semi-Final
23	27 August 2009	World Games Stadium, Kaohsiung, Taiwan	Guam	12–0	0	2010 EAFF Championship Semi-Final
24	18 November 2009	Hong Kong Stadium, Hong Kong	Japan	0–4	0	2011 AFC Asian Cup qualification
25	7 February 2010	Olympic Stadium, Tokyo, Japan	South Korea	0–5	0	2010 East Asian Football Championship
26	11 February 2010	Olympic Stadium, Tokyo, Japan	Japan	0–3	0	2010 East Asian Football Championship
27	14 February 2010	Olympic Stadium, Tokyo, Japan	China	0–2	0	2010 East Asian Football Championship
28	17 November 2010	Hong Kong Stadium, Hong Kong	Paraguay	0–7	0	Friendly
29	9 February 2011	Shah Alam Stadium, Kuala Lumpur, Malaysia	Malaysia	0–2	0	Friendly
