= Ernestina (footballer) =

Brazilian footballer (born 1974)

Personal information
- Full name: Clodoaldo de Oliveira
- Date of birth: March 19, 1974 (age 52)
- Place of birth: Ernestina, Rio Grande do Sul, Brazil
- Height: 1.78 m (5 ft 10 in)
- Position: Attacking midfielder

Senior career*
Years	Team	Apps	(Gls)
2001	Avaí	?	
?–2004	Esportivo	?	
2004–2006	Happy Valley	29	(26)
- * Club domestic league appearances and goals as of January 17, 2007 ‡ National team caps and goals as of January 17, 2007

Clodoaldo de Oliveira (born March 19, 1974, in Ernestina, Rio Grande do Sul), known as Ernestina or Oliveira, is a Brazilian footballer.

== Biography ==
Before he left for Hong Kong in August 2004, he played for Esportivo.

He has played as a midfielder for the Hong Kong First Division club Happy Valley in the 2005-06 season.

The free scoring left winger became the top scorer in all competition in his debut season in Hong Kong First Division in 2004-05. But he was denied the chance to compete for the Footballer of the Year award when his club failed to nominate him. The following season saw him continued his scoring form and help his team to the league title, even though for the large part he had been playing out of position.

== Honours ==
With Happy Valley:

- Hong Kong First Division League: 2005-06

Personal Hononrs:

- Hong Kong First Division League Top Scorer: 2004-05, 2005–06
- Hong Kong League Cup Top Scorer: 2004-05
- Hong Kong FA Cup Top Scorer: 2004-05

== Career statistics ==
=== Club career ===
As of January 17, 2007

Club	Season	No.	League		League Cup		Senior Shield		FA Cup		AFC Cup		Total	
Club	Season	No.	Apps	Goals	Apps	Goals	Apps	Goals	Apps	Goals	Apps	Goals	Apps	Goals
Happy Valley	2004-05	6	16	16	4	7	3	1	3	5	—	—	26	29
Happy Valley	2005-06	6	13	10	5	0	3	2	3	1	—	—	24	13
Happy Valley	Total		29	26	9	7	6	3	6	6	—	—	50	42
Career Total														

== Trivia ==
- Ernestina scored four hat tricks for Happy Valley in the 2004-05 season.
- On June 4, 2005, Ernestina helped Kitchee to beat Italian giants Juventus FC in an exhibition match.

Preceded by Julius Akosah	Hong Kong First Division League Top Scorer; 2004-05	Succeeded by Ernestina; Fábio Lopes
Preceded by Ernestina	Hong Kong First Division League Top Scorer; 2005-06 with Fábio Lopes	Succeeded by Tales Schutz
Preceded by Roger Batoum; Musa Shannon; Cornelius Udebuluzor	Hong Kong League Cup Top Scorer; 2004-05	Succeeded by Fábio Lopes; Keith Gumbs
Preceded by Julius Akosah; Gerard Guy Ambassa; Marcio Gabriel Anacleto; Cheung Sai Ho; Martin Jancula	Hong Kong FA Cup Top Scorer; 2004-05	Succeeded by Lico
