= Evanor =

Brazilian footballer (born 1974)

Personal information
- Full name: Evanor João Fantin
- Date of birth: March 16, 1974 (age 52)
- Place of birth: Brazil
- Height: 1.79 m (5 ft 10 in)
- Position: Midfielder

Team information
- Current team: EC Pelotas

Senior career*
Years	Team	Apps	(Gls)
?–2003	Esportivo	?	
2003–04	Farroupilha	?	
2004–07	Happy Valley	13	(3)
2008–	EC Pelotas	0	(0)
- * Club domestic league appearances and goals as of August 3, 2006 ‡ National team caps and goals as of August 3, 2006

Evanor João Fantin, simply known as Evanor (born March 16, 1974) is a Brazilian footballer who currently plays as a defensive midfielder for Eastern in the Hong Kong First Division.

== Honours ==
With Happy Valley:

- Hong Kong First Division League: 2005-06

== Career statistics ==
=== Happy Valley Career Statistics ===
As of August 3, 2006

Club	Season	League		League Cup		Senior Shield		FA Cup		AFC Cup		Total	
Club	Season	Apps	Goals	Apps	Goals	Apps	Goals	Apps	Goals	Apps	Goals	Apps	Goals
Happy Valley	2005-06	13	3	5	1	3	1	3	1	6	2	30	8
Happy Valley	2006-07	0	0	0	0	0	0	0	0	0	0	0	0
Happy Valley	All											30	8
