= Wong Chun Yue =

Hong Kong footballer and coach

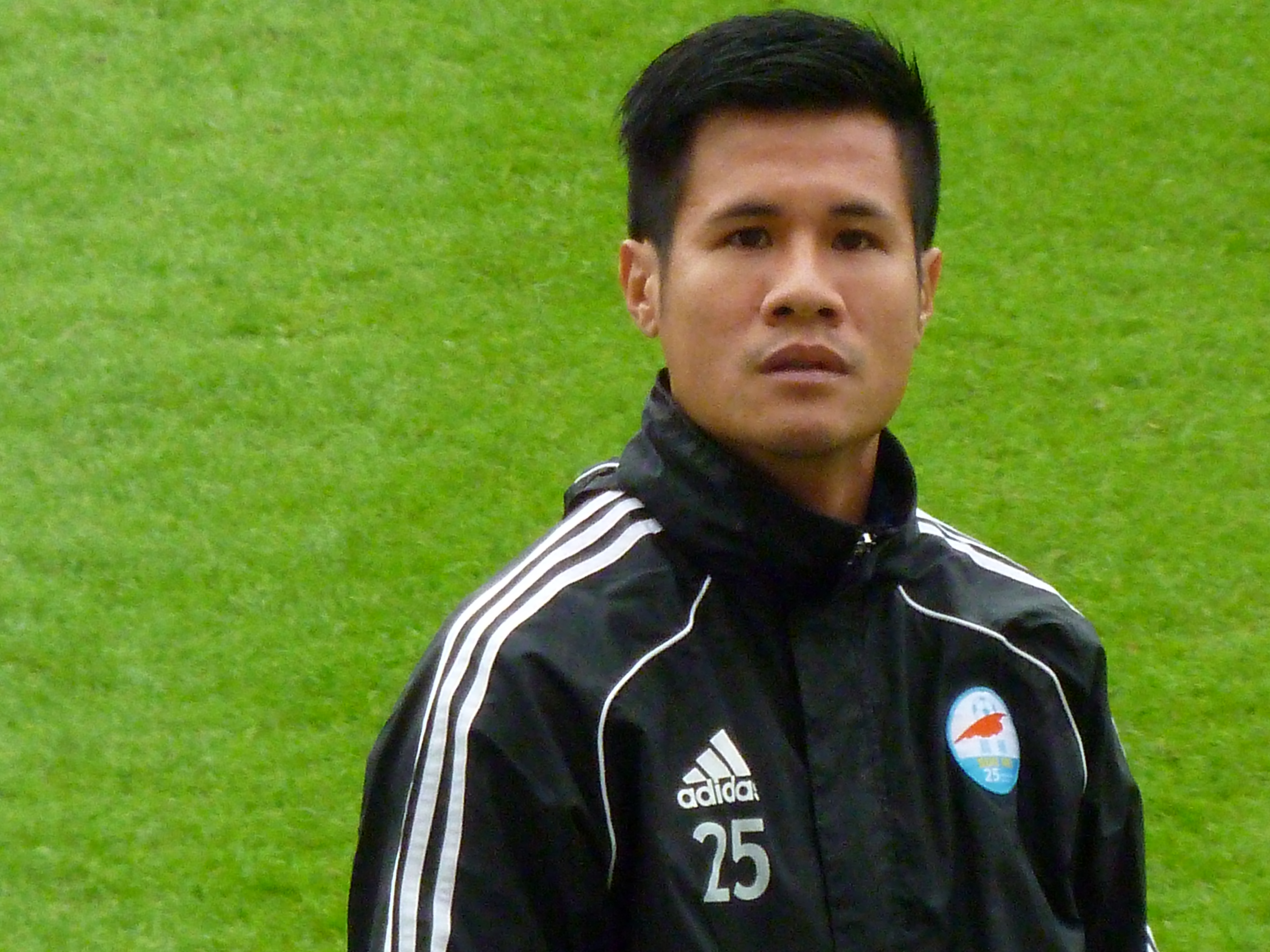

Personal information
- Full name: Wong Chun Yue
- Date of birth: 28 January 1978 (age 48)
- Place of birth: Hong Kong
- Height: 1.80 m (5 ft 11 in)
- Position: Right winger

Senior career*
Years	Team	Apps	(Gls)
1996–1997	Happy Valley		(2)
1997–1999	Hong Kong Rangers		(3)
1999–2006	Sun Hei		(24)
2005–2006	→ South China (loan)	6	(1)
2006–2007	South China	15	(2)
2007–2008	Workable	16	(1)
2008–2009	Eastern	16	(2)
2009–2010	Shatin	17	(0)
2010	→ Tai Po (loan)	5	(0)
2011–2012	Sun Hei	0	(0)
2012–2014	Eastern	21	(2)
2017–2020	St. Joseph's	32	(1)
2022–2023	Leaper		

International career^{‡}
1999	Hong Kong U-23		(1)
2000–2006	Hong Kong	26	(6)

Managerial career
- 2014–2019: Eastern (assistant coach)
- 2019: Eastern (caretaker)
- * Club domestic league appearances and goals as of 13:15, 5 January 2011 (UTC) ‡ National team caps and goals as of 13:15, 5 January 2011 (UTC)

Wong Chun Yue (Chinese: 黃鎮宇; Jyutping: wong^{4} zan^{3} jyu^{5}; born 28 January 1978 in Hong Kong) is a Hong Kong football coach and a former professional football player.

Wong played as a right winger and he sometimes plays as a striker as well.

== Workable FC ==
On 19 January 2008, Wong scored the winning goal in a League Cup match against his previous club South China.

== Honours ==
=== As a player ===
==== Club ====
Sun Hei

- Hong Kong First Division League: 2001-02, 2003-04, 2004-05
- Hong Kong League Cup: 2002–03, 2003–04, 2004–05
- Hong Kong Senior Shield: 2004-05, 2011–12
- Hong Kong FA Cup: 2002-03, 2004-05

South China

- Hong Kong First Division League: 2006-07
- Hong Kong Senior Shield: 2006-07
- Hong Kong FA Cup: 2006-07

==== Individual ====
- Hong Kong Senior Shield Top Scorer: 2006–07

=== As a coach ===
==== Club ====
Eastern

- Hong Kong Premier League: 2015-16

=== Club career ===
As of 19 May 2007

Club	Season	League		Senior Shield		League Cup		FA Cup		AFC Cup		Total	
Club	Season	Apps	Goals	Apps	Goals	Apps	Goals	Apps	Goals	Apps	Goals	Apps	Goals
South China	2005–06	6 (0)	1	1 (0)	0	3 (0)	1	2 (0)	0	NA	NA	12 (0)	2
South China	2006–07	11 (4)	2	4 (0)	2	4 (0)	0	2 (1)	0	NA	NA	21 (5)	4
South China	All	17 (4)	3	5 (0)	2	7 (0)	1	2 (1)	0	NA	NA	33 (5)	6

== International goals ==
No.	Date	Venue	Opponent	Score	Result	Competition
1.	5 March 2003	Taipei, Taiwan	Mongolia	3–0	6–0	2005 East Asian Football Championship
2.	7 March 2003	Taipei, Taiwan	Guam	5–0	15–0	2005 East Asian Football Championship
3.	7 March 2003	Taipei, Taiwan	Guam	11–0	15–0	2005 East Asian Football Championship
4.	7 March 2003	Taipei, Taiwan	Guam	12–0	15–0	2005 East Asian Football Championship
5.	10 November 2003	Tashkent, Uzbekistan	Thailand	2–1	2–1	2004 AFC Asian Cup qualification
6.	13 October 2004	Kowloon, Hong Kong	Malaysia	2–0	2–0	2006 FIFA World Cup qualification

== Notes and references ==
Preceded by Keith Gumbs	Hong Kong Senior Shield Top Scorer; 2006–07 with Jaimes McKee, Lico, Tales Schütz	Succeeded by Rodrigo
