= Julius Akosah =

Cameroonian footballer

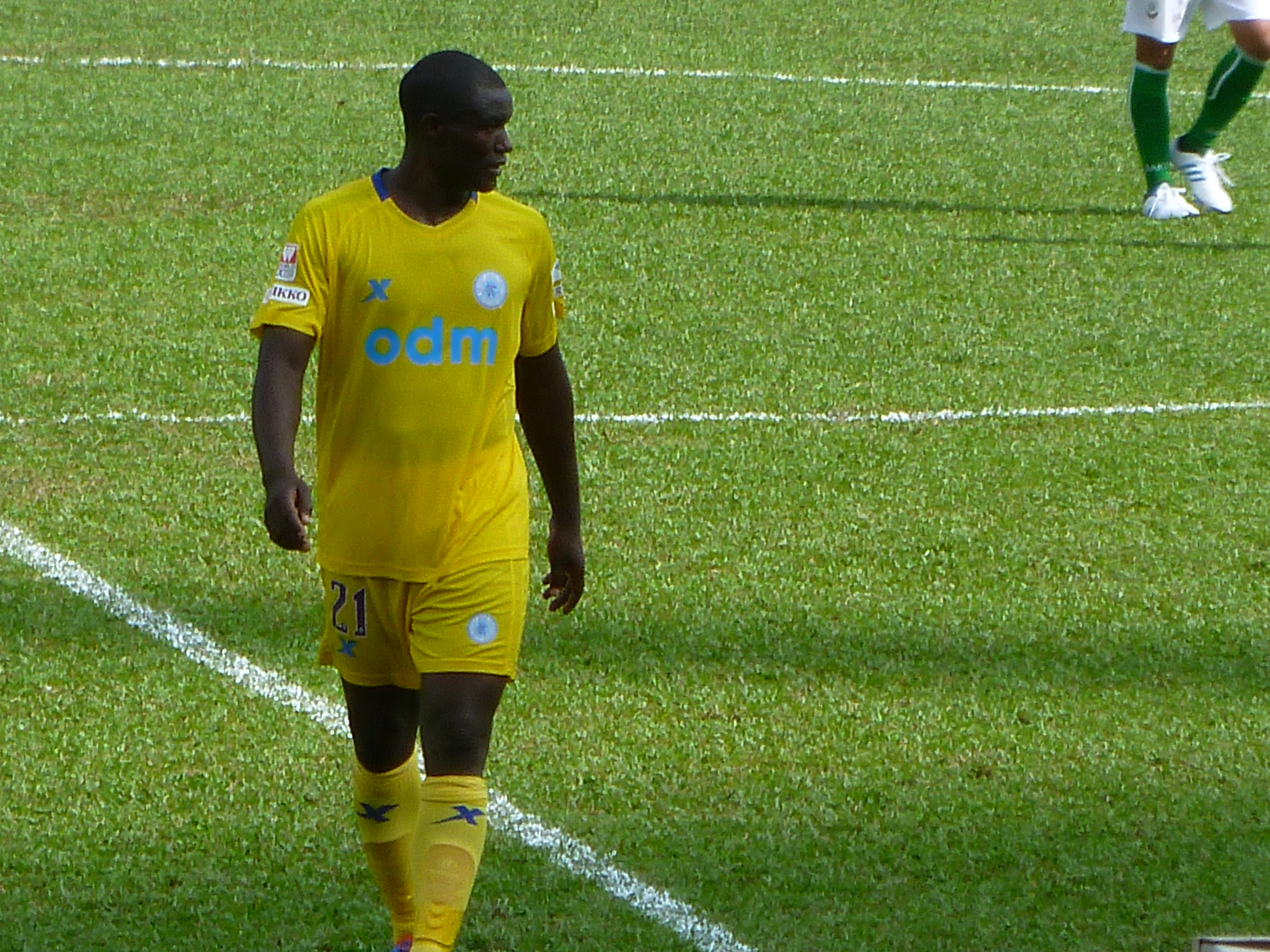

Personal information
- Full name: Julius Pongla Akosah
- Date of birth: 16 October 1982 (age 44)
- Place of birth: Buea, Cameroon
- Height: 1.85 m (6 ft 1 in)
- Positions: Striker; centre back

Team information
- Current team: Fu Moon

Senior career*
Years	Team	Apps	(Gls)
2002–2003	Rangers (HKG)		
2003–2006	Sun Hei		(24)
2006–2008	Kitchee	27	(19)
2008–2009	Eastern	18	(7)
2009–2010	Sun Hei	15	(3)
2010–2011	Persija Jakarta	2	(0)
2010–2011	→ Bontang (loan)	14	(3)
2011	Sun Hei	2	(0)
2012	Tuen Mun	9	(1)
2012–2013	Rangers (HKG)	12	(3)
2013–2014	Happy Valley	7	(2)
2015–2016	Eastern District	17	(9)
2019	Kowloon City	9	(1)
2019–2020	Fu Moon	6	(1)
2022–2023	Fu Moon	1	(0)
- * Club domestic league appearances and goals

Julius Pongla Akosah (Chinese: 亞古沙 Akosah, born 16 October 1982 ) is a Cameroonian former footballer. His position was striker. He was once called up by Cameroon in 2006. Hong Kong football fans commonly use Agumon as a nickname for him because of his transcriptional name.

== Club career ==
Akosah has played for a few clubs in Hong Kong First Division League including Buler Rangers, Sun Hei, Kitchee and Eastern. In summer 2009, Akosah returned to Sun Hei as Eastern self-relegated to the Third Division League.

Spending a year in Sun Hei, Akosah decided not to extend his contract with Sun Hei. On 12 August 2010, The Jakarta Globe reports that Indonesian Super League club Persija Jakarta said it had secured the services of Julius Akosah.

Akosah returned to Sun Hei in September 2011, but on 5 January 2012, Sun Hei released him and he moved to Tuen Mun. Akosah scored in the 60th minute on his debut for Tuen Mun on 7 January 2012 against Tai Po, but the match ended 1–1.

== International career ==
Akosah's outstanding performance in 2005 AFC Cup caught the attention of the coach of the Cameroon national football team. He was called for the training squad for 2006 Africa Cup of Nations but was left out of the final squad.

In 2009, Akosah became a permanent resident of Hong Kong and applied for a Hong Kong passport, but his application failed, so he is not eligible to play for the Hong Kong football team in international matches. Akosah made his unofficial debut for Hong Kong on 29 December 2009 in the Guangdong-Hong Kong Cup. He scored twice to secure a 2–1 victory for Hong Kong at Siu Sai Wan Sports Ground. In the 2nd leg Guangdong-Hong Kong Cup match, on 2 January 2010, he received his first red card for Hong Kong.

== Honours ==
=== Club ===
Sun Hei

- Hong Kong First Division League
  - Winner: 2003–04, 2004–05
- Hong Kong League Cup
  - Winner: 2003–04, 2004–05
- Hong Kong Senior Shield
  - Winner: 2004–05
- Hong Kong FA Cup
  - Winner: 2004–05, 2005–06

Kitchee

- Hong Kong League Cup
  - Winner: 2006–07

=== Individual ===
- Hong Kong First Division League Top Scorer: 2003–04
- Hong Kong Senior Shield Top Scorer: 2003–04
- Hong Kong FA Cup Top Scorer: 2003–04

== Statistics ==
=== Club ===
As of 28 July 2010

Club	Season	League		Senior Shield		League Cup		FA Cup		AFC Cup		Total	
Club	Season	Apps	Goals	Apps	Goals	Apps	Goals	Apps	Goals	Apps	Goals	Apps	Goals
Sun Hei	2003–04		12		3		3		2	N/A			20
Sun Hei	2004–05		8		1		1		1		7		18
Sun Hei	2005–06		4		0		3		0	5	6		9
Sun Hei	All		24		4		7		3		13		47
Kitchee	2006–07	17	15	3	0	5	2	2	2	N/A		27	19
Kitchee	2007–08	10	4	3	1	3	1	1	1	N/A		17	7
Kitchee	All	27	19	6	1	8	3	5	3	N/A		44	26
Eastern	2008–09	18	7	1	0	3	1	1	0	5	1	28	9
Eastern	All	18	7	1	0	3	1	1	0	5	1	28	9
Sun Hei	2009–10	15	3	2	1	N/A		1	0	N/A		18	4
Sun Hei	All	15	3	2	1	N/A		1	0	N/A		18	4

Awards
Preceded by Keith Gumbs	Hong Kong First Division League Top Scorer; 2003–04	Succeeded by Clodoaldo de Oliveira
Preceded by Keith Gumbs	Hong Kong Senior Shield Top Scorer; 2003–04 with Sham Kwok Keung	Succeeded by Wilfed Bamnjo; Keith Gumbs
Preceded by Chan Yiu Lun; Kim Moon-Chul; Lau Chi Keung; Marcio Gabriel Anacleto; Cornelius Udebuluzor	Hong Kong FA Cup Top Scorer; 2003–04 with Gerard Guy Ambassa; Marcio Gabriel Anacleto; Cheung Sai Ho; Martin Jancula	Succeeded by Clodoaldo de Oliveira
