= José Ricardo Rambo =

Brazilian footballer and manager

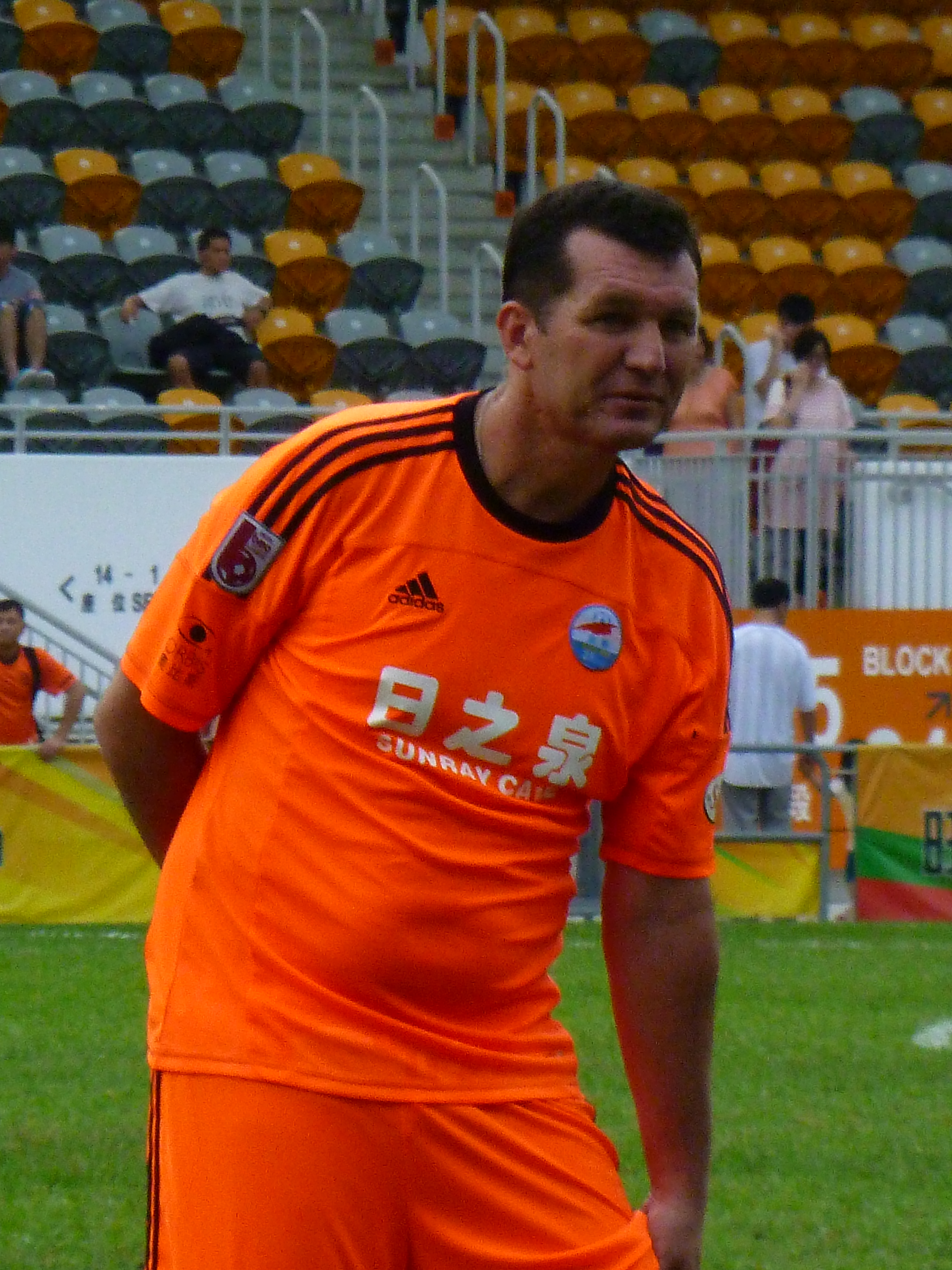

Personal information
- Full name: José Ricardo Rambo
- Date of birth: 17 August 1971 (age 55)
- Place of birth: Rio Grande do Sul, Brazil
- Height: 6 ft 1 in (1.85 m)
- Position: Centre back

Senior career*
Years	Team	Apps	(Gls)
1989–1982	Novo Hamburgo (RS)		
1992–1994	Internacional (RS)		
1995	Brasil-FA (RS)		
1995	XV de Novembro (RS)		
1996	Atlético Sorocaba (SP)		
1997-98	Náutico (PE)		
1998–1999	South China		
2000–2003	Sun Hei	22	(5)
2004–2005	Rangers (HKG)	11	(0)
2005–2006	Happy Valley	16	(3)

Managerial career
- 2006: Happy Valley
- 2006–2007: Rangers (HKG)
- 2007–2008: South China (assistant coach)
- 2008–2009: Pegasus
- 2009–2010: Pegasus
- 2010–2012: Sun Hei
- 2012: Guangdong Sunray Cave
- 2012–2013: Novo Hamburgo U20
- 2013–2014: Rangers (HKG)
- 2014–2015: Pegasus
- 2015: South China (assistant coach)
- 2015: South China (caretaker)
- 2015–2016: Rangers
- 2016: South China (caretaker)
- 2016: South China (assistant coach)
- 2017–: Hong Kong Women
- * Club domestic league appearances and goals

José Ricardo Rambo (Chinese: 列卡度 Ricardo, born 17 August 1971) is a Brazilian football coach. He works for football development in Hong Kong after retiring from professional football. He is the former player and manager of Rangers (HKG). He was also the head coach of Sun Hei and China League One club Guangdong Sunray Cave previously. He is currently the head coach of Hong Kong women's national football team.

== Honours ==
=== Manager ===
Happy Valley

- Hong Kong First Division: 2005–06

Pegasus

- Hong Kong Senior Shield: 2008–09
- Hong Kong FA Cup: 2009–10

Sun Hei

- Hong Kong Senior Shield: 2011–12

=== Assistant manager ===
South China

- Hong Kong First Division: 2007–08
- Hong Kong League Cup: 2007–08
