= Cristiano Cordeiro =

Hong Kong footballer (born 1973)

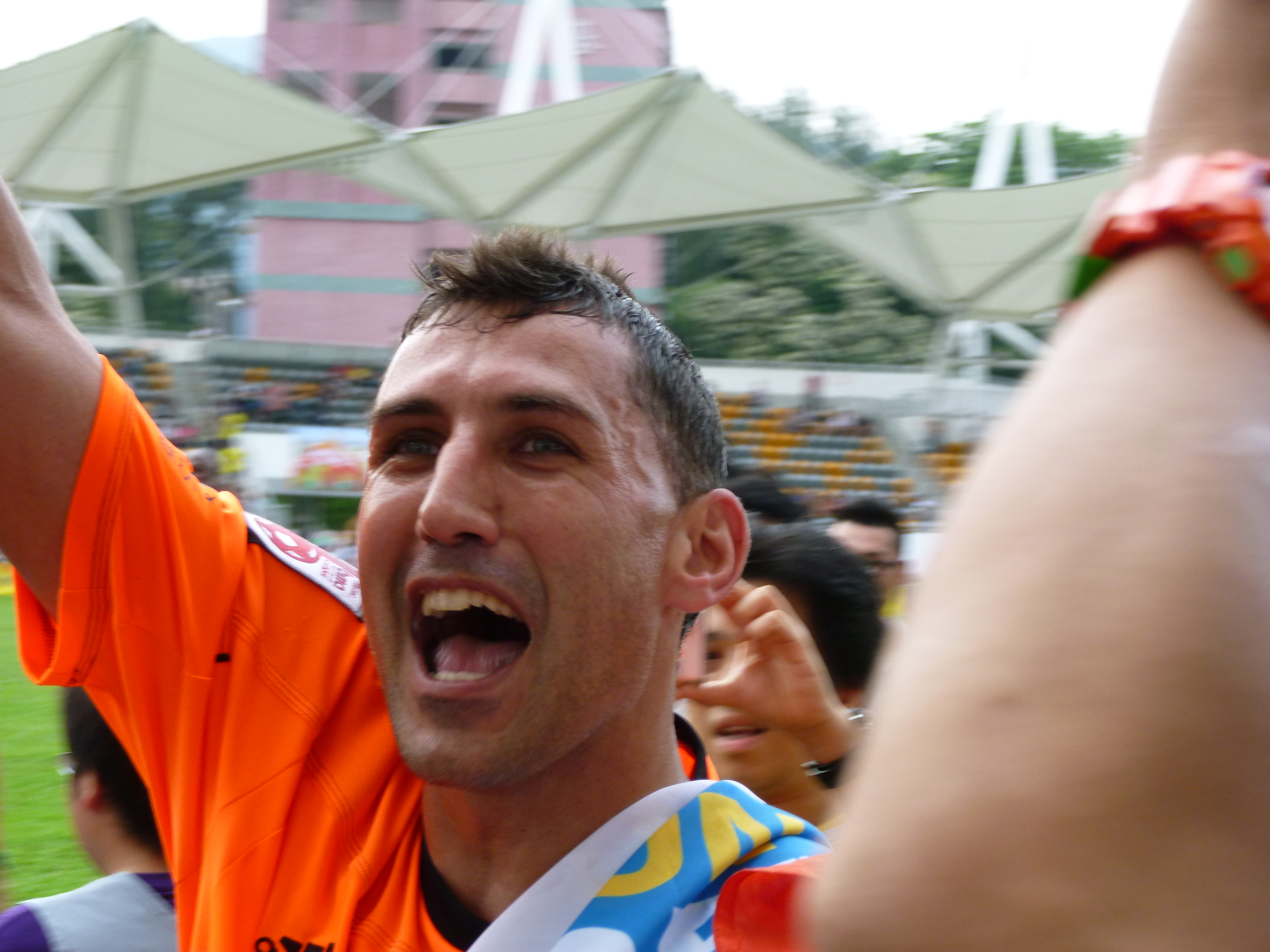
- Cordeiro in 2012

Personal information
- Full name: Cristiano Preigchadt Cordeiro
- Date of birth: 14 August 1973 (age 53)
- Place of birth: Porto Alegre, Rio Grande do Sul, Brazil
- Height: 1.85 m (6 ft 1 in)
- Position: Centre-back

Team information
- Current team: Eastern (assistant coach)

Youth career
- 1988–1989: SC Internacional

Senior career*
Years	Team	Apps	(Gls)
1990–1996	SC Internacional		
1996–1997	Fortaleza EC		
1998–2003	South China	75	(8)
2003–2012	Sun Hei	135	(16)
2014–2015	Kui Tan		
2015–2017	Resources Capital	25	(1)
2017–2018	Double Flower	11	(1)

International career
2006–2009	Hong Kong	13	(1)

Managerial career
- 2012–2013: SC Internacional (youth coach)
- 2013: Eastern (assistant coach)
- 2013–2015: Eastern
- 2016–2019: Kitchee (assiatant coach)
- 2019–2020: Southern (assistant coach)
- 2020: Southern
- 2020: Southern (assistant coach)
- 2021–2025: Eastern (assistant coach)
- 2025–2026: Eastern (caretaker)
- 2026: Eastern (assistant coach)
- 2026: Eastern (caretaker)
- 2026–: Eastern (assistant coach)
- * Club domestic league appearances and goals

Cristiano Preigchadt Cordeiro (Chinese: 高尼路; born 14 August 1973) is a former professional footballer who played as a centre-back. He is currently the assistant coach of Hong Kong Premier League club Eastern.

Born in Brazil, he played for the Hong Kong national team.

== Club career ==
Cordeiro started his career at Rio Grande do Sul playing at Sport Club Internacional since he was 14. Before he moved to Hong Kong, he played for Brasil de Farroupilha and Fortaleza EC.

Cordeiro joined Hong Kong First Division club South China in 1998. In the 2003–04 season, due to the all-Chinese policy induced by the club, he transferred to another First Division club Sun Hei.

Cordeiro was twice the Hong Kong Footballer of the Year (2000–01 and 2004–05) and he has gained many awards since then.

In May 2012, Cordeiro announced his retirement from professional football.

== International career ==
In September 2006, Cordeiro became a Hong Kong permanent resident after applying for the HKSAR passport. On 11 October 2006, he made his international debut for Hong Kong in the 2007 AFC Asian Cup qualifiers against Qatar.

== Coaching career ==
Cordeiro joined Eastern in the 2013–14 season as an assistant coach. On 9 October 2013, he was appointed as the head coach of Eastern until June 2015.

In 2016, Cordeiro joined Kitchee as an assistant coach.

On 25 June 2019, Cordeiro's resigned from Kitchee in order to join Southern as an assistant under his former teammate Cheng Siu Chung. On 16 March 2020, following the departure of Cheng, Cordeiro became the co-head coach at Southern along with Pui Ho Wang. On 29 June 2020, Cordeiro left Southern.

== Honours ==
Individual

- Hong Kong Footballer of the Year: 2001, 2005

Awards
Preceded by None	Hong Kong League Cup Best Defensive Player; 2004–05	Succeeded by Cheung Kin Fung
Preceded by Ivan Jević	Hong Kong Senior Shield Best Defensive Player; 2006–07	Succeeded by Luciano
Preceded by Au Wai Lun	Hong Kong First Division League Most Popular Player; 2006–07	Succeeded by Lee Chi Ho
