= Fábio Lopes (footballer, born 1977) =

Brazilian footballer

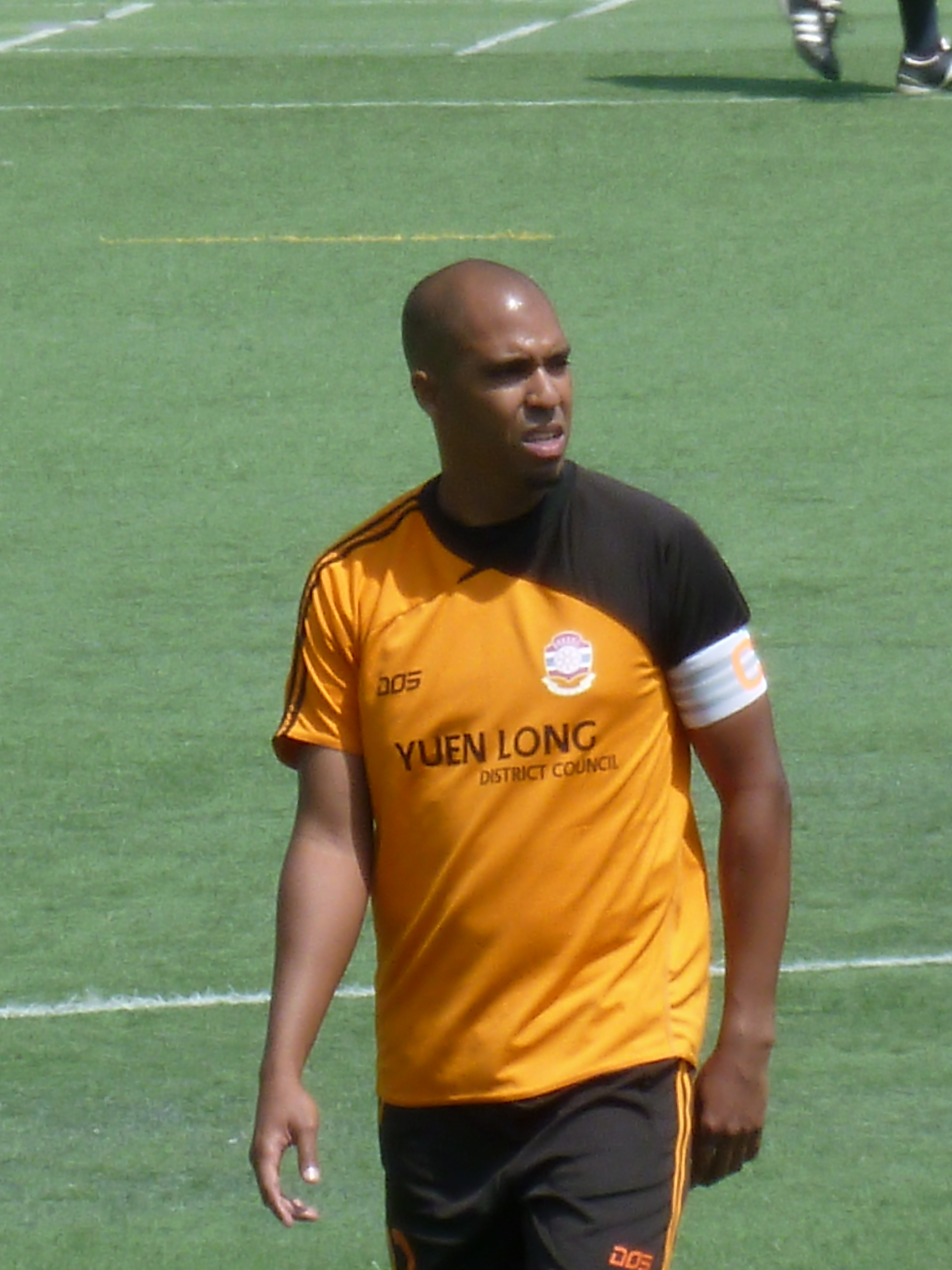

Personal information
- Full name: Fábio Lopes Alcântara
- Date of birth: 24 March 1977 (age 49)
- Place of birth: Salvador, Bahia, Brazil
- Height: 1.88 m (6 ft 2 in)
- Position: Centre back

Senior career*
Years	Team	Apps	(Gls)
1996–1997	Bahia		
?–2004	Passo Fundo		
2004	Platinense		
2004–2007	Happy Valley	36	(16)
2007–2008	Eastern	13	(4)
2008–2009	Persib Bandung	32	(3)
2009	Persija Jakarta	16	(6)
2009–2010	Shatin	16	(4)
2010–2011	Pontic	22	(23)
2011	Hoi Fan	8	(6)
2011–2012	Mettip	20	(20)
2012	Kuan Tai	7	(6)
2012–2020	Yuen Long	124	(37)
2020–2021	Pegasus	15	(1)
2021–2024	Shatin	42	(9)

Managerial career
- 2018–2020: Yuen Long (player-coach)
- 2020–2021: Pegasus (player-coach)
- * Club domestic league appearances and goals

Fábio Lopes Alcântara (Chinese: 法比奧; born 24 March 1977), or simply Fábio Lopes, is a Brazilian former professional footballer who played as a centre back.

== Club career ==
He played as a striker for Eastern, having signed from Happy Valley in August 2007.

On 17 May 2018, Fabio announced his retirement at the annual Hong Kong Football Awards. However, on 4 June 2018, Yuen Long chairman Wilson Wong stated that Fabio had reversed his decision, and would become a player-coach for the club the following season. He was appointed as Assistant Manager from 15 July 2018 until 31 May 2020.

Following Yuen Long's self-relegation, Fabio joined Pegasus as a player-coach on 14 June 2020.

== Family ==
Fábio has two younger brothers, they are both professional footballers.

His younger brother Fabrício Alcântara played for Shatin. Also, Fabrício was a teammate with Fábio for Hong Kong First Division club Happy Valley during 2006–07.

Also, his other younger brother Fernando Lopes played for Hong Kong First Division clubs South China and Sham Shui Po. He is currently playing for Rangers.

== Honours ==
=== Club ===
Happy Valley

- Hong Kong First Division: 2005–06

Eastern

- Hong Kong Senior Shield: 2007–08

Yuen Long

- Hong Kong Senior Shield: 2017–18

=== Individual honours ===
- Hong Kong First Division Top Scorer: 2005–06
- Hong Kong League Cup Top Scorer: 2005–06

== Career statistics ==
=== Club ===
As of 20 May 2021

Club	Season	No.	League		League Cup		Senior Shield		FA Cup		AFC Cup		Total	
Club	Season	No.	Apps	Goals	Apps	Goals	Apps	Goals	Apps	Goals	Apps	Goals	Apps	Goals
Happy Valley	2004–05	9	10	5	?	2	?	1	?	0	?	1	?	9
Happy Valley	2005–06	9	14	10	?	4	?	1	?	0	?	2	?	17
Happy Valley	2006–07	9	12	1	?	3	—	—	?	0	?	0	?	4
Happy Valley	Total		36	16		9		2		0		3		30
Eastern	2007–08	9	13	4	4	0	2	1	?	0	—	—	?	5
Eastern	Total		13	4	4	0	2	1		0				5
Shatin	2009–10	14	4	0	0	0	0	0	0	0	—	—	0	0
Shatin	Total		4	0	0	0	0	0	0	0			0	0
Yuen Long	2013–14	7	17	3	—	—	1	1	0	0	—	—	18	4
Yuen Long	2014–15	7	12	1	1	0	1	0	2	0	—	—	16	1
Yuen Long	2015–16	7	14	0	2	0	1	0	4	2	—	—	21	2
Yuen Long	2016–17	7	20	1	—	—	1	0	1	0	—	—	22	3
Yuen Long	2017–18	7	16	2	—	—	3	0	2	0	—	—	21	7
Yuen Long	2018–19	7	16	1	—	—	1	0	3	0	—	—	20	2
Yuen Long	2019–20	7	9	0	—	—	1	0	1	0	—	—	11	0
	Total		104	8	3	0	9	1	13	2			129	19
Pegasus	2020–21	22	14	1	—	—	—	—	—	—	—	—	14	1
	Total		14	1									14	1
Career Total														

Preceded by Clodoaldo de Oliveira	Hong Kong First Division League Top Scorer; 2005–06 with Clodoaldo de Oliveira	Succeeded by Tales Schütz
Preceded by Clodoaldo de Oliveira	Hong Kong League Cup Top Scorer; 2005–06 with Keith Gumbs	Succeeded by Victor Eromosele Inegbenoise
