= Citizen AA =

Athletic club from Hong Kong

Citizen
- Full name: Citizen Football Club
- Nicknames: Flat Bags, TCAA
- Founded: 1947; 79 years ago
- Head coach: Lo Kwan Yee
- League: First Division
- 2025–26: First Division, 12th of 14
Home colours	Away colours

The Citizen Athletic Association (Chinese: 公民體育會), simply known as Citizen or TCAA, is a Hong Kong athletic club. Its football team (Chinese: 公民足球隊) currently competes in the Hong Kong First Division, the second tier of Hong Kong football. The club has a long history in playing in the top-tier Hong Kong First Division, but decided to self-relegate in the 2013–14 season after declining to participate in the newly established Hong Kong Premier League.

The club plays its home matches at Happy Valley Recreation Ground.

== Recent history ==
=== 2007–08 season ===
Citizen won the 2007–08 Hong Kong FA Cup. The club beat Tai Po in the final by 2–0.

=== 2009–10 season ===
Due to Mong Kok Stadium's renovation, Citizen used the Siu Sai Wan Sports Ground in the 2009–10 season for its home games. Former South China striker Detinho joined the club.

=== 2010–11 season ===
Citizen won the 2010–11 Senior Shield by beating South China in the final after penalty kicks, thus earning the club the right to represent Hong Kong in the 2012 AFC Cup. To celebrate this victory, the club announced a prize fund of HK$800,000 (approx US$100,000), an iPhone 4 for every player and an end-of-season vacation for the whole team.

=== 2011–12 season ===
The club moved from the remote Siu Sai Wan Sports Ground to the renovated Mong Kok Stadium for the 2011–12 Hong Kong First Division League season. To compete in both local football and AFC Cup, Citizen has expanded its squad to include 27 players, adding Michael Campion, So Loi Keung, Chiu Chun Kit, Amaury Nunes and Yuto Nakamura to the club, while promoting two young players Chan Si-Chun and Yeung Ho Wan. Citizen is spending an unprecedented HK$400,000 on the team's 12 days pre-season training camp in Vancouver, Canada, during which time the club will play 3 warm-up games. The club announced on 7 September that Rasonic has become its new shirt sponsor for the 2011–12 and 2012–13 seasons. The sponsorship is worth HK$1 million.

=== 2013–14 season ===
The club moved from Mong Kok Stadium to Tsing Yi Sports Ground, which Citizen shared with Sun Hei as their common home ground. They decided to self-relegate at the end of the season after declining to participate in the newly established Hong Kong Premier League.

=== 2022–23 season ===
The club managed to finish third in the Hong Kong FA Cup Junior Division despite finishing in the bottom half of the league table.

=== 2024–25 season ===
The club won the title of the Hong Kong First Division for the first time. However, they denied promotion to the Hong Kong Premier League due to financial difficulties.

== Honours ==
=== League ===
- Hong Kong First Division
  - Champions (1): 2024–25
- Hong Kong Second Division
  - Champions (2): 1999–2000, 2003–04

=== Cup ===
- Hong Kong Senior Shield
  - Champions (1): 2010–11
- Hong Kong FA Cup
  - Champions (1): 2007–08
- Hong Kong FA Cup Junior Division
  - Champions (1): 2014–15

== Continental record ==
Season	Competition	Round	Club	Home	Away	Position
2012	AFC Cup	Group G	(Singapore) Home United	1–2	3–1	3rd
2012	AFC Cup	Group G	(Myanmar) Yangon United	2–1	1–2	3rd
2012	AFC Cup	Group G	(Thailand) Chonburi FC	3–3	2–0	3rd

== Kit evolution ==
2016–17 home	2017–18 home	2018–19 home	2019–21 home	2021–22 home	2022–23 home

2016–17 away	2017–18 away	2018–19 away	2019–21 away	2021–22 away	2022–23 away

Kit sponsors and manufacturers

Period	Kit Manufacturer	Kit Sponsor
2005–06	Lotto	bma
2006–07	HO	bma
2007–2016	Jako	bma
2016–2022	Macron	Rasonic
2022–	square	Rasonic

== Recent seasons ==
Season	Team name	League	Pos.	Pl.	W	D	L	GS	GA	P	Hong Kong FA Cup Junior Division	Notes
2014–15	Citizen	1st Div	5	28	15	7	6	68	38	40	Champions	
2015–16	Citizen	1st Div	6	26	13	6	7	55	31	40	Round 2	
2016–17	Citizen	1st Div	6	26	9	6	11	57	62	33	Round 2	
2017–18	Citizen	1st Div	10	30	11	7	12	63	65	40	4th	
