= 2008–09 Hong Kong First Division League =

Hong Kong First Division
- Season: 2008–09
- Champions: South China; 39th Hong Kong title
- Relegated: Eastern; Mutual
- AFC Cup: South China; NT Realty Wofoo Tai Po
- Matches played: 156
- Goals scored: 516 (3.31 per match)
- Top goalscorer: Detinho; Giovane (18)
- Highest scoring: Tuen Mun Progoal 0–9 South China; Mutual 0–9 Happy Valley; Citizen 7–2 Mutual
- Highest attendance: 4,228; Fourway 1–2 TSW Pegasus; Kitchee 1–3 South China (16 November 2008)
- Lowest attendance: 90; Sheffield United 4–1 Mutual (25 October 2008)
- Average attendance: 1,033

The 2008–09 Hong Kong First Division League season, known as Coolpoint Ventilation First Division (Chinese: 快意空調甲組聯賽) for sponsorship reasons, was the 97th since its establishment in 1908. It began on 6 September 2008 and ended on 10 May 2009. The unveiling match was contested by the defending champions South China, and the runners-up of last season Citizen. They made a 1–1 draw, scored by Sandro of Citizen and Detinho of South China, China.

Three new teams joined the league as competition members, including Fourway, TSW Pegasus and Xiangxue Eisiti. The league consisted of 13 teams, the most since the 1979–80 season.

== League team changes ==
Teams promoted from 2007–08 Hong Kong Second Division League

- Champions: Mutual

Teams relegated to 2008–09 Hong Kong Second Division League

- Bulova Rangers (renamed as Rangers)

New teams in Hong Kong football league system

- Fourway
- TSW Pegasus
- Xiangxue Eisiti (from mainland China)

Teams changed the name

- NT Realty Wofoo Tai Po (named as Wofoo Tai Po before)
- Sheffield United (named as Lanwa Redbull before, from mainland China)
- Tuen Mun Progoal (named as Workable before)

== League table ==
Pos	Team	Pld	W	D	L	GF	GA	GD	Pts	Qualification or relegation
1	South China (C)	24	19	4	1	73	11	+62	61	AFC Cup 2010 Group stage
2	Kitchee	24	17	5	2	56	17	+39	56	
3	Citizen	24	13	8	3	51	23	+28	47	
4	Fourway	24	12	6	6	38	17	+21	42 (Note: FOU 1–0 CSH; CSH 1–0 FOU)	
5	Convoy Sun Hei	24	13	3	8	39	32	+7	42	
6	NT Realty Wofoo Tai Po	24	11	8	5	40	23	+17	41 (Note: WTP 2–2 TSW; TSW 1–2 WTP)	AFC Cup 2010 Group stage (Note: Since TSW Pegasus, the winners of 2008–09 Hong Kong Senior Challenge Shield, were competition members of the Hong Kong Football Association, and could not qualify for any AFC competitions, the winners of 2008–09 Hong Kong FA Cup, NT Realty Wofoo Tai Po, earned a spot in the group stage of AFC Cup 2010.)
7	TSW Pegasus	24	12	5	7	51	23	+28	41	
8	Happy Valley	24	9	5	10	52	34	+18	32	
9	Eastern (R)	24	8	4	12	28	33	−5	28	Relegation to Third Division
10	Sheffield United (W)	24	6	5	13	36	43	−7	23	Withdrew from the Hong Kong football league system
11	Tuen Mun Progoal	24	3	3	18	19	95	−76	12	
12	Mutual (R)	24	2	2	20	21	84	−63	8	Relegation to Second Division
13	Xiangxue Eisiti (W)	24	1	2	21	12	81	−69	5	Withdrew from the Hong Kong football league system

Updated to match(es) played on 10 May 2009. Source: The Hong Kong Football Association
Rules for classification: 1) points; 2) head-to-head points; 3) head-to-head goal difference; 4) head-to-head goals scored; 5) goal difference; 6) number of goals scored.
(C) Champions; (R) Relegated; (W) Withdrew

== Results ==
Home \ Away	CIT	CSH	EAA	FOU	HVA	KIT	MUT	WTP	SHU	SCA	TSW	TMP	XXE
Citizen		0–1	0–0	3–1	2–1	0–0	7–2	0–0	2–1	1–2	3–2	4–1	6–1
Convoy Sun Hei	1–1		4–0	1–0	1–3	1–2	2–1	0–2	2–2	1–2	1–2	1–0	3–1
Eastern	1–0	3–4		0–1	0–0	1–3	5–0	1–3	1–1	0–2	0–0	1–3	5–1
Fourway	1–1	1–0	2–0		3–0	0–2	6–1	0–0	1–0	1–1	1–2	6–0	4–0
Happy Valley	0–1	1–2	0–1	0–2		1–1	7–1	3–5	0–0	1–2	3–2	5–1	3–0
Kitchee	0–0	2–1	1–0	2–0	3–2		3–1	1–1	3–0	1–3	1–1	7–1	5–0
Mutual	2–5	0–4	2–1	0–2	0–9	1–3		1–3	2–3	0–6	0–3	2–0	0–0
NT Realty Wofoo Tai Po	1–4	0–1	0–1	0–0	0–0	3–2	0–0		2–1	0–1	2–2	0–0	4–0
Sheffield United	2–3	0–0	0–1	2–2	1–2	0–4	4–1	1–3		1–3	0–6	4–0	5–0
South China	1–1	7–0	3–0	0–0	3–2	0–1	4–1	2–0	2–0		0–0	8–0	2–0
TSW Pegasus	1–2	0–1	3–0	2–0	1–1	0–1	3–1	1–2	2–0	0–3 (Note: South China is awarded a 3–0 win against TSW Pegasus due to TSW Pegasus using more than the allowed maximum six foreign players at a time in the match.)		5–1	2–0
Tuen Mun Progoal	1–1	0–3	0–5	0–1	2–7	0–6	2–1	0–3	1–4	0–9	0–8		2–2
Xiangxue Eisiti	0–4	2–4	0–1	0–3	0–1	0–2	2–1	1–6	0–4	0–7	0–3	2–4	

Source: http://www.hkfa.com
Legend: Blue = home team win; Yellow = draw; Red = away team win.
Notes:

All times are Hong Kong Time (UTC+8).

=== Round 1 ===
6 September 2008	South China	1–1	Citizen	Hong Kong Stadium
15:30	Detinho 72'	Report	Sandro 32'	Attendance: 2,523; Referee: Ng Chiu Kok

7 September 2008	Eastern	0–0	Happy Valley	Mong Kok Stadium
14:00		Report		Attendance: 2,391; Referee: Wong Chi Tang

7 September 2008	TSW Pegasus	0–1	Kitchee	Mong Kok Stadium
16:00		Report	McKee 12'	Attendance: 2,391; Referee: Wong Po On

9 September 2008	Tuen Mun Progoal	0–3	NT Realty Wofoo Tai Po	Mong Kok Stadium
18:00		Report	Annan 65'; Joel 72' 77'	Attendance: 633; Referee: Cheng Oi Cho

9 September 2008	Mutual	0–0	Xiangxue Eisiti	Mong Kok Stadium
20:00		Report		Attendance: 633; Referee: Chan Shui Hung

10 September 2008	Sheffield United	0–0	Convoy Sun Hei	Mong Kok Stadium
20:00		Report		Attendance: 232; Referee: Liu Kwok Man

=== Round 2 ===
13 September 2008	NT Realty Wofoo Tai Po	2–1	Sheffield United	Tai Po Sports Ground
15:00	Ye Jia 7'; Joel 90+'	Report	Jiang Sheng 65'	Attendance: 1,136; Referee: Ng Kai Lam

13 September 2008	Xiangxue Eisiti	0–1	Eastern	Mong Kok Stadium
19:30		Report	Akosah 78'	Attendance: 157; Referee: Wong Chi Tang

14 September 2008	Kitchee	3–1	Mutual	Mong Kok Stadium
14:00	Ngue 51' 63' 79'	Report	Leung Tsz Chun 47'	Attendance: 1,328; Referee: Pau Sai Yin

14 September 2008	Convoy Sun Hei	1–2	TSW Pegasus	Mong Kok Stadium
16:00	Chan Yiu Lun 20' (pen.)	Report	Yip Chi Ho 60'; Cheung Kin Fung 75'	Attendance: 1,328; Referee: Fung Ka Yu

15 September 2008	Citizen	4–1	Tuen Mun Progoal	Mong Kok Stadium
14:00	Sandro 29' 61' 81'; Paulinho 85'	Report	Chau Wai Ming 35'	Attendance: 606; Referee: Liu Kwok Man

15 September 2008	Happy Valley	0–2	Fourway	Mong Kok Stadium
16:00		Report	Caleb 3'; Minga 69'	Attendance: 606; Referee: Ng Chiu Kok

=== Round 3 ===
19 September 2008	Mutual	0–4	Convoy Sun Hei	Mong Kok Stadium
18:00		Report	Giovane 27' 40' 82'; Anderson 77'	Attendance: 404; Referee: Cheng Oi Cho

19 September 2008	Sheffield United	2–3	Citizen	Mong Kok Stadium
20:00	Lu Jing 41'; Hao Shuang 56'	Report	Xu Deshuai 23' 36'; Paulinho 81'	Attendance: 404; Referee: Ng Kai Lam

20 September 2008	TSW Pegasus	1–2	NT Realty Wofoo Tai Po	Mong Kok Stadium
14:00	Zeng Qixiang 65'	Report	Annan 10' 69'	Attendance: 2,142; Referee: Wong Po On

20 September 2008	Tuen Mun Progoal	0–9	South China	Mong Kok Stadium
16:00		Report	Schütz 31'; Chan Siu Ki 36' (pen.) 48' 70'; Detinho 50' 60' 62' 69'; Monteiro 76'	Attendance: 2,142; Referee: Pau Sai Yin

21 September 2008	Fourway	4–0	Xiangxue Eisiti	Mong Kok Stadium
14:00	Yu Yang 10'; Paulo 72'; Caleb 75' 84'	Report		Attendance: 787; Referee: Fung Ka Yu

21 September 2008	Eastern	1–3	Kitchee	Mong Kok Stadium
16:00	Rodrigo 24'	Report	Backhaus 7' (pen.) 16'; Zamudio 90'	Attendance: 787; Referee: Ng Chiu Kok

=== Round 4 ===
26 September 2008	Kitchee	2–0	Fourway	Mong Kok Stadium
18:00	Díaz 39'; Sepúlveda 44'	Report		Attendance: 837; Referee: Wong Po On

26 September 2008	Convoy Sun Hei	4–0	Eastern	Mong Kok Stadium
20:00	Giovane 10'; Anderson 69'; Kwok Yue Hung 80'; Lau Chi Keung 90'	Report		Attendance: 837; Referee: Pau Sai Yin

27 September 2008	NT Realty Wofoo Tai Po	0–0	Mutual	Tai Po Sports Ground
15:00		Report		Attendance: 993; Referee: Liu Kwok Man

27 September 2008	Xiangxue Eisiti	0–1	Happy Valley	Siu Sai Wan Sports Ground
15:00		Report	Godfred 90+'	Attendance: 95; Referee: Ng Kai Lam

28 September 2008	Citizen	3–2	TSW Pegasus	Hong Kong Stadium
14:00	Sandro 23' 90+' (pen.); Sham Kwok Fai 34' (pen.)	Report	Cheung Kin Fung 40'; Beto 68'	Attendance: 1,728; Referee: Ng Chiu Kok

28 September 2008	South China	2–0	Sheffield United	Hong Kong Stadium
16:00	Chan Siu Ki 7'; Schütz 26'	Report		Attendance: 1,728; Referee: Fung Ka Yu

=== Round 5 ===
1 October 2008	Sheffield United	4–0	Tuen Mun Progoal	Mong Kok Stadium
14:00	Hao Shuang 18'; Xu Yiwen 27'; Min Jin 76'; Lu Jing 88'	Report		Attendance: 742; Referee: Chan Shui Hung

1 October 2008	Fourway	1–0	Convoy Sun Hei	Mong Kok Stadium
16:00	Lam Hok Hei 54'	Report		Attendance: 742; Referee: Cheng Oi Cho

4 October 2008	Eastern	1–3	NT Realty Wofoo Tai Po	Mong Kok Stadium
14:00	Siumar 45'	Report	Lee Wai Lim 12'; Lee Hong Lim 55'; Junior 84'	Attendance: 1,333; Referee: Wong Po On

4 October 2008	Happy Valley	1–1	Kitchee	Mong Kok Stadium
16:00	Chao Pengfei 88'	Report	Zamudio 30'	Attendance: 1,333; Referee: Ng Chiu Kok

8 October 2008	TSW Pegasus	0 – 3 (awarded)	South China	Yuen Long Stadium
20:00	Itaparica 40'; Wong Chin Hung 53'; Ondoua 77'	Report	Schütz 5'; Chan Wai Ho 29'	Attendance: 2,537; Referee: Liu Kwok Man

- South China is awarded a 3 – 0 win against TSW Pegasus due to TSW Pegasus used more than the allowed maximum of 6 foreign players at a time in the match.

21 October 2008	Mutual	2–5	Citizen	Mong Kok Stadium
15:00	Leung Tsz Chun 75' 89'	Report	Rogerio 53'; Chen Zhizhao 61'; Paulinho 71' 82' 87'	Attendance: 152; Referee: Cheng Oi Cho

=== Round 6 ===
7 October 2008	Kitchee	5–0	Xiangxue Eisiti	Mong Kok Stadium
14:00	Ngue 2' 9' 65'; Zamudio 32'; Nanmi 43' (pen.)	Report		Attendance: 1,457; Referee: Wong Po On

7 October 2008	Convoy Sun Hei	1–3	Happy Valley	Mong Kok Stadium
16:00	Bamnjo 2'	Report	Ling Cong 40'; Chao Pengfei 43'; Gerard 72' (pen.)	Attendance: 1,457; Referee: Fung Ka Yu

11 October 2008	NT Realty Wofoo Tai Po	0–0	Fourway	Tai Po Sports Ground
15:00		Report		Attendance: 931; Referee: Liu Kwok Man

11 October 2008	Citizen	0–0	Eastern	Mong Kok Stadium
18:00		Report		Attendance: 390; Referee: Ng Chiu Kok

12 October 2008	Tuen Mun Progoal	0–8	TSW Pegasus	Hong Kong Stadium
14:00		Report	Mbome 4'; Wong Chin Hung 20' 60' 88'; Ondoua 27' 82'; Cheng Siu Wai 45'; Itaparica 51'	Attendance: 1,501; Referee: Wong Chi Tang

12 October 2008	South China	4–1	Mutual	Hong Kong Stadium
16:00	Chan Siu Ki 6' (pen.); Au Yeung Yiu Chung 48'; Schütz 59' 90'	Report	Apollo 21'	Attendance: 1,501; Referee: Fung Ka Yu

=== Round 7 ===
17 October 2008	Mutual	2–0	Tuen Mun Progoal	Mong Kok Stadium
18:00	Benin 29'; Leung Tsz Chun 39'	Report		Attendance: 312; Referee: Tong Kui Sum

17 October 2008	Xiangxue Eisiti	2–4	Convoy Sun Hei	Mong Kok Stadium
20:00	Huang Chao 51' 61'	Report	Giovane 27' 33' 78'; Chu Siu Kei 90'	Attendance: 312; Referee: Chan Shui Hung

18 October 2008	Happy Valley	3–5	NT Realty Wofoo Tai Po	Mong Kok Stadium
14:00	Gerard 32' (pen.); Ling Cong 56'; Chao Pengfei 85'	Report	Joel 1'; Ye Jia 15'; Junior 27' (pen.); Lee Wai Lim 50'; Annan 74'	Attendance: 1,300; Referee: Ng Kai Lam

18 October 2008	Fourway	1–1	Citizen	Mong Kok Stadium
16:00	Ma Ka Ki 26' (o.g.)	Report	Sandro 58' (pen.)	Attendance: 1,300; Referee: Liu Kwok Man

19 October 2008	South China	3–0	Eastern	Hong Kong Stadium
14:30	Cris 24'; Li Haiqiang 33'; Yang Xu 53' (o.g.)	Report		Attendance: 1,483; Referee: Wong Chi Tang

19 October 2008	TSW Pegasus	2–0	Sheffield United	Yuen Long Stadium
18:00	Luk Koon Pong 40'; Ondoua 67'	Report		Attendance: 1,321; Referee: Cheng Oi Cho

=== Round 8 ===
24 October 2008	Tuen Mun Progoal	0–5	Eastern	Mong Kok Stadium
18:00		Report	Yu Ho Pong 18' 27'; Lee Kin Wo 41'; Tam Lok Hin 53'; Akosah 89'	Attendance: 1,583; Referee: Chow Chun Kit

24 October 2008	South China	1–1	Fourway	Mong Kok Stadium
20:00	Detinho 89' (pen.)	Report	Edson 68'	Attendance: 1,583; Referee: Cheng Oi Cho

25 October 2008	NT Realty Wofoo Tai Po	4–0	Xiangxue Eisiti	Tai Po Sports Ground
15:00	Annan 5' 69'; So Loi Keung 28'; Lee Hong Lim 71'	Report		Attendance: 795; Referee: Ng Kai Lam

25 October 2008	Sheffield United	4–1	Mutual	Mong Kok Stadium
18:00	Hao Shuang 32' 37'; Min Jin 68' (pen.); Xu Yiwen 76'	Report	Victor 4'	Attendance: 90; Referee: Pau Sai Yin

26 October 2008	Citizen	2–1	Happy Valley	Mong Kok Stadium
14:00	Xu Deshuai 32'; Sham Kwok Fai 38' (pen.)	Report	Ling Cong 75'	Attendance: 1,432; Referee: Lui Siu Chuen

26 October 2008	Convoy Sun Hei	1–2	Kitchee	Mong Kok Stadium
16:00	Chu Siu Kei 42'	Report	Cheng Lai Hin 49'; Backhaus 61' (pen.)	Attendance: 1,432; Referee: Fung Ka Yu

=== Round 9 ===
31 October 2008	Xiangxue Eisiti	0–4	Citizen	Mong Kok Stadium
18:00		Report	Xu Deshuai 58'; Paulinho 60' 90'; Hélio 77'	Attendance: 321; Referee: Wong Po On

31 October 2008	Fourway	6–0	Tuen Mun Progoal	Mong Kok Stadium
20:00	Edson 25' 84'; Lai Yiu Cheong 28'; Caleb 45'; Paulo 61'; Tam Siu Wai 69'	Report		Attendance: 321; Referee: Lo Yuk Ming

1 November 2008	Eastern	1–1	Sheffield United	Mong Kok Stadium
14:00	Akosah 6'	Report	Ren Yongkun 90'	Attendance: 1,691; Referee: Ng Kai Lam

1 November 2008	Kitchee	1–1	NT Realty Wofoo Tai Po	Mong Kok Stadium
16:00	Lam Ka Wai 55'	Report	Lee Hong Lim 38'	Attendance: 1,691; Referee: Ng Chiu Kok

4 November 2008	Mutual	0–3	TSW Pegasus	Mong Kok Stadium
18:00		Report	Yuen Kin Man 51'; Ondoua 58'; Zeng Qixiang 84'	Attendance: 1,595; Referee: Cheng Oi Cho

4 November 2008	Happy Valley	1–2	South China	Mong Kok Stadium
20:00	Eze 75'	Report	Chan Wai Ho 9'; Maxwell 20'	Attendance: 1,595; Referee: Wong Po On

=== Round 10 ===
7 November 2008	Tuen Mun Progoal	2–7	Happy Valley	Mong Kok Stadium
18:00	Cheung Tin Tak 66'; Ito 85'	Report	Godfred 17' 74' 90'; Hassan 52' (o.g.); Chao Pengfei 72' 80'	Attendance: 907; Referee: Chow Chun Kit

7 November 2008	Citizen	0–0	Kitchee	Mong Kok Stadium
20:00		Report		Attendance: 907; Referee: Liu Kwok Man

8 November 2008	NT Realty Wofoo Tai Po	0–1	Convoy Sun Hei	Tai Po Sports Ground
15:00		Report	Giovane 47'	Attendance: 996; Referee: Wong Po On

8 November 2008	Sheffield United	2–2	Fourway	Mong Kok Stadium
18:00	Ge Shengxiang 8'; Li Jianbin 34'	Report	Minga 59'; Paulo 85' (pen.)	Attendance: 112; Referee: Ng Kai Lam

9 November 2008	TSW Pegasus	3–0	Eastern	Mong Kok Stadium
14:00	Itaparica 13'; Ondoua 34'; Mbome 64'	Report		Attendance: 2,190; Referee: Ng Chiu Kok

9 November 2008	South China	2–0	Xiangxue Eisiti	Mong Kok Stadium
16:00	Maxwell 42'; Au Yeung Yiu Chung 46'	Report		Attendance: 2,190; Referee: Lui Siu Chuen

=== Round 11 ===
14 November 2008	Xiangxue Eisiti	2–4	Tuen Mun Progoal	Mong Kok Stadium
18:00	Zhang Yu 59'; Ren Xin 89'	Report	Cheung Tin Tak 9' 55'; Ito 34'; Wood 45'	Attendance: 284; Referee: Pau Sai Yin

14 November 2008	Happy Valley	0–0	Sheffield United	Mong Kok Stadium
20:00		Report		Attendance: 284; Referee: Chan Shui Hung

15 November 2008	Eastern	5–0	Mutual	Mong Kok Stadium
14:00	Szeto Man Chun 8'; Tam Lok Hin 34' 71'; Akosah 43'; Wong Chun Yue 51'	Report		Attendance: 1,010; Referee: Wong Chi Tang

15 November 2008	Convoy Sun Hei	1–1	Citizen	Mong Kok Stadium
16:00	Giovane 24'	Report	Marlon 47'	Attendance: 1,010; Referee: Ng Kai Lam

16 November 2008	Fourway	1–2	TSW Pegasus	Mong Kok Stadium
14:00	Lam Hok Hei 69'	Report	Itaparica 28' 38'	Attendance: 4,228; Referee: Lui Siu Chuen

16 November 2008	Kitchee	1–3	South China	Mong Kok Stadium
16:00	Ngue 42'	Report	Man Pei Tak 12'; Au Yeung Yiu Chung 57'; Maxwell 90'	Attendance: 4,228; Referee: Ng Chiu Kok

=== Round 12 ===
12 December 2008	Mutual	0–2	Fourway	Mong Kok Stadium
18:00		Report	Paulo 11'; Minga 67'	Attendance: 151; Referee: Liu Kwok Man

12 December 2008	Sheffield United	5–0	Xiangxue Eisiti	Mong Kok Stadium
20:00	Mao Xun 41'; Ren Yongkun 62'; Xu Yiwen 67' 73'; Meng Ye 81'	Report		Attendance: 151; Referee: Cheng Oi Cho

13 December 2008	Tuen Mun Progoal	0–6	Kitchee	Mong Kok Stadium
14:00		Report	Liu Quankun 53'; Zamudio 63'; Ngue 66'; Chan Man Fai 76'; Cheng Lai Hin 81'; Ip Chung Long 88'	Attendance: 936; Referee: Lo Yuk Ming

13 December 2008	Citizen	0–0	NT Realty Wofoo Tai Po	Mong Kok Stadium
16:00		Report		Attendance: 936; Referee: Ng Kai Lam

14 December 2008	TSW Pegasus	1–1	Happy Valley	Mong Kok Stadium
14:00	Itaparica 50'	Report	Leung Chun Pong 51'	Attendance: 1,957; Referee: Ng Chiu Kok

14 December 2008	South China	7–0	Convoy Sun Hei	Mong Kok Stadium
16:00	Maxwell 2'; Detinho 4' 12' 61' 73'; Chan Siu Ki 8' 86'	Report		Attendance: 1,957; Referee: Wong Po On

=== Round 13 ===
27 December 2008	NT Realty Wofoo Tai Po	0–1	South China	Tai Po Sports Ground
15:00		Report	Maxwell 88'	Attendance: 2,520; Referee: Cheng Oi Cho

28 December 2008	Convoy Sun Hei	1–0	Tuen Mun Progoal	Mong Kok Stadium
14:00	Giovane 67' (pen.)	Report		Attendance: 576; Referee: Lui Siu Chuen

28 December 2008	Kitchee	3–0	Sheffield United	Mong Kok Stadium
16:00	Lo Kwan Yee 16' 89'; Gao Wen 20'	Report		Attendance: 576; Referee: Pau Sai Yin

29 December 2008	Xiangxue Eisiti	0–3	TSW Pegasus	Mong Kok Stadium
19:30		Report	Zeng Qixiang 32'; Ondoua 60'; Beto 80'	Attendance: 172; Referee: Wong Chi Tang

7 January 2009	Happy Valley	7–1	Mutual	Mong Kok Stadium
14:00	Poon Man Tik 23' 68'; Godfred 54'; Leung Chun Pong 59'; Sham Kwok Keung 76'; Ling Cong 83' 87'	Report	Victor 78'	Attendance: 362; Referee: Ng Kai Lam

7 January 2009	Fourway	2–0	Eastern	Mong Kok Stadium
16:00	Minga 82' 90'	Report		Attendance: 362; Referee: Chan Shui Hung

=== Round 14 ===
9 January 2009	Convoy Sun Hei	2–2	Sheffield United	Mong Kok Stadium
15:00	Giovane 17'; Bamnjo 65'	Report	Hao Shuang 20'; Zhang Yuqi 22'	Attendance: 105; Referee: Cheng Oi Cho

10 January 2009	NT Realty Wofoo Tai Po	0–0	Tuen Mun Progoal	Tai Po Sports Ground
15:00		Report		Attendance: 419; Referee: Ng Chiu Kok

10 January 2009	Xiangxue Eisiti	2–1	Mutual	Mong Kok Stadium
18:00	Xu Yihai 73'; Huang Chao 90'	Report	Lee Sze Ming 51'	Attendance: 200; Referee: Chow Chun Kit

10 January 2009	Happy Valley	0–1	Eastern	Mong Kok Stadium
20:00		Report	Akosah 23'	Attendance: 200; Referee: Pau Sai Yin

11 January 2009	Kitchee	1–1	TSW Pegasus	Mong Kok Stadium
14:00	Cáceres 71'	Report	Nakamura 5'	Attendance: 3,569; Referee: Cheng Oi Cho

11 January 2009	Citizen	1–2	South China	Mong Kok Stadium
16:00	Hélio 50'	Report	Bai He 25'; Detinho 33' (pen.)	Attendance: 3,569; Referee: Ng Kai Lam

=== Round 15 ===
18 January 2009	Tuen Mun Progoal	1–1	Citizen	Mong Kok Stadium
13:00	Yao Xiaocong 1'	Report	Yeung Chi Lun 28'	Attendance: 488; Referee: Wong Chi Tang

18 January 2009	Eastern	5–1	Xiangxue Eisiti	Mong Kok Stadium
15:00	Akosah 16' 70'; Zeng Qixiang 24' 27'; Szeto Man Chun 86'	Report	Li Xin 52'	Attendance: 488; Referee: Lo Yuk Ming

1 February 2009	TSW Pegasus	0–1	Convoy Sun Hei	Yuen Long Stadium
15:00		Report	Carlos 56'	Attendance: 1,306; Referee: Wong Chi Tang

2 February 2009	Fourway	3–0	Happy Valley	Mong Kok Stadium
15:00	Paulo 6' 11'; Iu Wai 18'	Report		Attendance: 304; Referee: Wong Po On

3 February 2009	Mutual	1–3	Kitchee	Mong Kok Stadium
18:00	So Yiu Man 26'	Report	Ngue 8'; Cáceres 80'; Luis Cupla 86'	Attendance: 421; Referee: Cheng Oi Cho

3 February 2009	Sheffield United	1–3	NT Realty Wofoo Tai Po	Mong Kok Stadium
20:00	Hao Shuang 63'	Report	Joel 21'; Caleb 45'; Lee Wai Lim 45+'	Attendance: 421; Referee: Lui Siu Chuen

=== Round 16 ===
6 February 2009	Citizen	2–1	Sheffield United	Mong Kok Stadium
15:00	Marlon 76'; Chen Zhizhao 77'	Report	Gu Wenxiang 24'	Attendance: 138; Referee: Liu Kwok Man

7 February 2009	NT Realty Wofoo Tai Po	2–2	TSW Pegasus	Tai Po Sports Ground
15:00	Annan 63'; So Loi Keung 77'	Report	Nakamura 27'; Okano 79'	Attendance: 1,280; Referee: Ng Chiu Kok

7 February 2009	Xiangxue Eisiti	0–3	Fourway	Mong Kok Stadium
18:00		Report	Minga 19'; Lukalu 78'; Paulo 89' (pen.)	Attendance: 223; Referee: Lui Siu Chuen

7 February 2009	Convoy Sun Hei	2–1	Mutual	Mong Kok Stadium
20:00	Giovane 28'; Lau Chi Keung 63'	Report	Benin 46'	Attendance: 223; Referee: Pau Sai Yin

8 February 2009	Kitchee	1–0	Eastern	Mong Kok Stadium
14:00	Cáceres 10'	Report		Attendance: 2,006; Referee: Chan Shui Hung

8 February 2009	South China	8–0	Tuen Mun Progoal	Mong Kok Stadium
16:00	Cacá 10' 30' 88'; Kim Yeon-Gun 17'; Chan Siu Ki 50' 69'; Au Yeung Yiu Chung 52' 74'	Report		Attendance: 2,006; Referee: Wong Po On

=== Round 17 ===
12 February 2009	Mutual	1–3	NT Realty Wofoo Tai Po	Mong Kok Stadium
15:00	Yip Tsz Chun 83'	Report	Caleb 54' 71'; Junior 59'	Attendance: 202; Referee: Cheng Oi Cho

13 February 2009	Happy Valley	3–0	Xiangxue Eisiti	Mong Kok Stadium
18:00	Leung Chun Pong 5'; Chao Pengfei 40'; Ling Cong 42'	Report		Attendance: 361; Referee: Ng Kai Lam

13 February 2009	Eastern	3–4	Convoy Sun Hei	Mong Kok Stadium
20:00	Wong Chun Yue 8'; Alex 24'; Yang Xu 90' (pen.)	Report	Seino 11' 45'; Tse Man Wing 63'; Chan Yiu Lun 67'	Attendance: 361; Referee: Pau Sai Yin

14 February 2009	TSW Pegasus	1–2	Citizen	Mong Kok Stadium
15:00	Nakamura 53'	Report	Max 25'; Sandro 24'	Attendance: 1,122; Referee: Ng Chiu Kok

15 February 2009	Fourway	0–2	Kitchee	Mong Kok Stadium
14:00		Report	Paulo 31' (o.g.); Zamudio 54'	Attendance: 1,622; Referee: Cheng Oi Cho

15 February 2009	Sheffield United	1–3	South China	Mong Kok Stadium
16:00	Hao Shuang 60'	Report	Cacá 13' 55'; Detinho 54'	Attendance: 1,622; Referee: Liu Kwok Man

=== Round 18 ===
13 March 2009	Tuen Mun Progoal	1–4	Sheffield United	Mong Kok Stadium
14:00	Ip Tsz Lung 8' (pen.)	Report	Lai Zhong 4' (pen.); Ge Shengxiang 24'; Hao Shuang 85' 90'	Attendance: 328; Referee: Liu Kwok Man

13 March 2009	Convoy Sun Hei	1–0	Fourway	Mong Kok Stadium
16:00	Giovane 60'	Report		Attendance: 328; Referee: Ng Kai Lam

14 March 2009	NT Realty Wofoo Tai Po	0–1	Eastern	Tai Po Sports Ground
15:00		Report	Alex 81'	Attendance: 542; Referee: Chan Shui Hung

15 March 2009	Citizen	7–2	Mutual	Siu Sai Wan Sports Ground
13:00	Yuan Yang 3' 78'; Sandro 5' 30'; Marlon 54'; Yeung Chi Lun 61'; Festus Baise 85'	Report	Li Xin 8'; Victor 9'	Attendance: 358; Referee: Pau Sai Yin

15 March 2009	Kitchee	3–2	Happy Valley	Siu Sai Wan Sports Ground
15:00	McKee 18' 33'; Cupla 76'	Report	Godfred 54'; Chao Pengfei 90'	Attendance: 358; Referee: Ng Chiu Kok

26 March 2009	South China	0–0	TSW Pegasus	Mong Kok Stadium
20:00		Report		Attendance: 1,937; Referee: Ng Chiu Kok

=== Round 19 ===
27 February 2009	Happy Valley	1–2	Convoy Sun Hei	Mong Kok Stadium
14:00	Chao Pengfei 75'	Report	Giovane 61'; Roberto 71'	Attendance: 742; Referee: Wong Po On

27 February 2009	Fourway	0–0	NT Realty Wofoo Tai Po	Mong Kok Stadium
16:00		Report		Attendance: 742; Referee: Liu Kwok Man

28 February 2009	Xiangxue Eisiti	0–2	Kitchee	Mong Kok Stadium
14:00		Report	Tsang Kam To 12'; Cáceres 89'	Attendance: 664; Referee: Lo Yuk Ming

28 February 2009	Eastern	1–0	Citizen	Mong Kok Stadium
16:00	Yang Xu 44'	Report		Attendance: 664; Referee: Ng Chiu Kok

1 March 2009	TSW Pegasus	5–1	Tuen Mun Progoal	Mong Kok Stadium
14:00	Mbome 38'; Nakamura 48'; Lai Yiu Cheong 52'; Itaparica 56'; Lee Hong Lim 66'	Report	Tita 61'	Attendance: 1,366; Referee: Pau Sai Yin

1 March 2009	Mutual	0–6	South China	Mong Kok Stadium
16:00		Report	Detinho 33' 46'; Bai He 63'; Man Pei Tak 67'; Li Haiqiang 73'; Chan Siu Ki 83'	Attendance: 1,366; Referee: Lui Siu Chuen

=== Round 20 ===
10 April 2009	Tuen Mun Progoal	2–1	Mutual	Mong Kok Stadium
14:00	Tunde 33'; Zhao Wei 87'	Report	Leung Tsz Chun 90'	Attendance: 1,022; Referee: Ng Chiu Kok

10 April 2009	Citizen	3–1	Fourway	Mong Kok Stadium
16:00	Sham Kwok Fai 35'; Sandro 57' 85'	Report	Paulo 78' (pen.)	Attendance: 1,022; Referee: Lui Siu Chuen

12 April 2009	Sheffield United	0–6	TSW Pegasus	Mong Kok Stadium
14:00		Report	Lee Hong Lim 6'; Cheng Siu Wai 15'; Nakamura 58' (pen.) 74' 84'; Fofo 83'	Attendance: 2,561; Referee: Liu Kwok Man

12 April 2009	Eastern	0–2	South China	Mong Kok Stadium
16:00		Report	Schutz 5'; Chan Siu Ki 71'	Attendance: 2,561; Referee: Wong Po On

13 April 2009	Convoy Sun Hei	3–1	Xiangxue Eisiti	Mong Kok Stadium
14:00	Giovane 22' 32'; Seino 62'	Report	Yin Heng 84'	Attendance: 565; Referee: Pau Sai Yin

14 April 2009	NT Realty Wofoo Tai Po	0–0	Happy Valley	Mong Kok Stadium
15:00		Report		Attendance: 287; Referee: Wong Chi Tang

=== Round 21 ===
27 March 2009	Mutual	2–3	Sheffield United	Mong Kok Stadium
14:00	Leung Tsz Chun 11'; Chen Bo 79' (o.g.)	Report	Gu Wenxiang 60' 90'; Min Jin 69'	Attendance: 173; Referee: Wong Po On

27 March 2009	Happy Valley	0–1	Citizen	Mong Kok Stadium
16:00		Report	Marlon 28'	Attendance: 173; Referee: Ng Kai Lam

28 March 2009	Eastern	1–3	Tuen Mun Progoal	Mong Kok Stadium
14:00	Yeung Ching Kwong 89' (pen.)	Report	Tita 12' 61' (pen.); Fatai 85'	Attendance: 601; Referee: Tong Kui Sum

28 March 2009	Kitchee	2–1	Convoy Sun Hei	Mong Kok Stadium
16:00	Cáceres 52' 81' (pen.)	Report	Chan Yiu Lun 43'	Attendance: 601; Referee: Wong Chi Tang

30 March 2009	Xiangxue Eisiti	1–6	NT Realty Wofoo Tai Po	Mong Kok Stadium
18:00	Zhang Yu 90'	Report	Lee Wai Lim 1' 5'; Caleb 15'; So Loi Keung 18' 77'; Sze Kin Wai 87'	Attendance: 987; Referee: Wong Po On

30 March 2009	South China	0–0	Fourway	Mong Kok Stadium
20:00		Report		Attendance: 987; Referee: Liu Kwok Man

=== Round 22 ===
17 April 2009	Sheffield United	0–1	Eastern	Hong Kong Stadium
18:00		Report	Picoli 90'	Attendance: 1,377; Referee: Wong Chi Tang

17 April 2009	South China	3–2	Happy Valley	Hong Kong Stadium
20:00	Chan Siu Ki 46'; Detinho 83' 90' (pen.)	Report	Ling Cong 64'; Gerard 87' (pen.)	Attendance: 1,377; Referee: Cheng Oi Cho

18 April 2009	Tuen Mun Progoal	0–1	Fourway	Mong Kok Stadium
14:00		Report	Lukalu 88'	Attendance: 188; Referee: Wong Po On

18 April 2009	Citizen	6–1	Xiangxue Eisiti	Mong Kok Stadium
16:00	Paulinho 27'; Chan Man Chun 35'; Festus 38'; Ju Yingzhi 57'; Yeung Chi Lun 70'; Hélio 88'	Report	Huang Xin 86'	Attendance: 188; Referee: Tong Kui Sum

22 April 2009	TSW Pegasus	3–1	Mutual	Mong Kok Stadium
18:00	Lee Hong Lim 55'; Mbome 77'; Yip Chi Ho 79'	Report	Victor 45'	Attendance: 545; Referee: Chan Shui Hung

22 April 2009	NT Realty Wofoo Tai Po	3–2	Kitchee	Mong Kok Stadium
20:00	Caleb 63'; Annan 74'; Lee Wai Lim 75'	Report	McKee 21'; Chan Man Fai 38'	Attendance: 545; Referee: Ng Chiu Kok

=== Round 23 ===
24 February 2009	Kitchee	0–0	Citizen	Mong Kok Stadium
18:00		Report		Attendance: 1,065; Referee: Cheng Oi Cho

24 February 2009	Xiangxue Eisiti	0–7	South China	Mong Kok Stadium
20:00		Report	Au Yeung Yiu Chung 4' 52'; Cris 17'; Liang Zicheng 19'; Cacá 24'; Detinho 63'; Li Haiqiang 78'	Attendance: 1,065; Referee: Pau Sai Yin

3 March 2009	Fourway	1–0	Sheffield United	Mong Kok Stadium
14:00	To Hon To 49'	Report		Attendance: 358; Referee: Ng Kai Lam

3 March 2009	Convoy Sun Hei	0–2	NT Realty Wofoo Tai Po	Mong Kok Stadium
16:00		Report	Annan 52'; Júnior 61'	Attendance: 358; Referee: Wong Po On

31 March 2009	Happy Valley	5–1	Tuen Mun Progoal	Mong Kok Stadium
18:00	Ling Cong 59'; Poon Man Tik 83' 87' 90'; Chao Pengfei 90'	Report	Fatai 35'	Attendance: 456; Referee: Lo Yuk Ming

31 March 2009	Eastern	0–0	TSW Pegasus	Mong Kok Stadium
20:00		Report		Attendance: 456; Referee: Cheng Oi Cho

=== Round 24 ===
24 April 2009	Tuen Mun Progoal	2–2	Xiangxue Eisiti	Mong Kok Stadium
18:00	Tunde 48'; Leung Chi Lap 66'	Report	Zhang Yu 23'; Li Yingjian 87'	Attendance: 288; Referee: Lui Siu Chuen

24 April 2009	Citizen	0–1	Convoy Sun Hei	Mong Kok Stadium
20:00		Report	Seino 45'	Attendance: 288; Referee: Ng Kai Lam

26 April 2009	TSW Pegasus	2–0	Fourway	Hong Kong Stadium
14:00	Lai Yiu Cheong 43'; Yip Chi Ho 87'	Report		Attendance: 2,847; Referee: Ng Chiu Kok

26 April 2009	South China	0–1	Kitchee	Hong Kong Stadium
16:00		Report	Cáceres 28'	Attendance: 2,847; Referee: Wong Chi Tang

27 April 2009	Mutual	2–1	Eastern	Mong Kok Stadium
18:00	Leung Tsz Chun 22'; Yip Tsz Chun 88'	Report	Alex 54'	Attendance: 228; Referee: Wong Po On

27 April 2009	Sheffield United	1–2	Happy Valley	Mong Kok Stadium
20:00	Gu Wenxiang 57'	Report	Poon Man Tik 38' 83'	Attendance: 228; Referee: Pau Sai Yin

=== Round 25 ===
1 May 2009	Happy Valley	3–2	TSW Pegasus	Mong Kok Stadium
14:00	Ling Cong 5' 24' 45'	Report	Mbome 81' 82'	Attendance: 3,068; Referee: Ng Kai Lam

1 May 2009	Convoy Sun Hei	1–2	South China	Mong Kok Stadium
16:00	Seino 36'	Report	Wong Chin Hung 71'; Detinho 83'	Attendance: 3,068; Referee: Liu Kwok Man

2 May 2009	Xiangxue Eisiti	0–4	Sheffield United	Mong Kok Stadium
14:00		Report	Gu Wenxiang 25' 28'; Xu Yiwen 63' 73'	Attendance: 500; Referee: Chan Shui Hung

2 May 2009	NT Realty Wofoo Tai Po	1–4	Citizen	Mong Kok Stadium
16:00	So Loi Keung 48' (pen.)	Report	Sandro 28' 63' 71'; Xu Deshuai 44'	Attendance: 500; Referee: Wong Po On

3 May 2009	Fourway	6–1	Mutual	Mong Kok Stadium
14:00	Lukalu 16'; Yu Yang 18'; Minga 40'; Paulo 63'; Iu Wai 85'; Lau Ka Shing 89'	Report	Leung Chi Kui 50' (pen.)	Attendance: 351; Referee: Wong Chi Tang

3 May 2009	Kitchee	7–1	Tuen Mun Progoal	Mong Kok Stadium
16:00	Cáceres 13' (pen.) 59' 77'; Cupla 20'; Ling 50'; Ngue 57'; Wei Zhonghu 81'	Report	Ip Tsz Kin 70'	Attendance: 351; Referee: Tong Kui Sum

=== Round 26 ===
8 May 2009	Mutual	0–9	Happy Valley	Mong Kok Stadium
18:00		Report	Eze 3' 12' 41'; Ling Cong 17'; Godfred 49' 59' 80'; Sham Kwok Keung 65'; Law Chun Bong 89'	Attendance: 315; Referee: Wong Po On

8 May 2009	Eastern	0–1	Fourway	Mong Kok Stadium
20:00		Report	Paulo 44' (pen.)	Attendance: 315; Referee: Chan Shui Hung

9 May 2009	Tuen Mun Progoal	0–3	Convoy Sun Hei	Mong Kok Stadium
14:00		Report	Giovane 23' 74'; Seino 65'	Attendance: 367; Referee: Liu Kwok Man

9 May 2009	Sheffield United	0–4	Kitchee	Mong Kok Stadium
16:00		Report	Cheng Lai Hin 2'; Lo Kwan Yee 21'; Ngue 78' 89'	Attendance: 367; Referee: Ng Kai Lam

10 May 2009	TSW Pegasus	2–0	Xiangxue Eisiti	Mong Kok Stadium
13:30	Itaparica 87'; Cheng Siu Wai 90'	Report		Attendance: 1,812; Referee: Lam Chi Ho

10 May 2009	South China	2–0	NT Realty Wofoo Tai Po	Mong Kok Stadium
15:30	Kwok Kin Pong 32'; Chan Chi Hong 84'	Report		Attendance: 1,812; Referee: Ng Chiu Kok

== Season statistics ==
=== Scoring ===
- First goal of the season: Sandro for Citizen against South China (6 September 2008).
- First own goal of the season: Ma Ka Ki (Citizen) for Fourway (18 October 2008).
- Most goals scored by one player in a match: 4 goals – Detinho (South China) against Tuen Mun Progoal, 50', 60', 62', 69' (20 September 2008) and against Convoy Sun Hei, 4', 12', 61', 73' (14 December 2008).
- Widest winning margin: 9 goals – Tuen Mun Progoal 0–9 South China (20 September 2008).
- Most goals in a match: 9 goals
- Most goals in one half
- Most goals in one half by a single team

=== Discipline ===
- First yellow card of the season
- First red card of the season
- Most yellow cards in a single match
- Most red cards in a single match

=== Miscellaneous ===
- Most consecutive games without conceding a goal

== Top scorers ==
Rank	Scorer	Club	Goals
1	Detinho	South China	18
1	Giovane	Convoy Sun Hei	18
3	Sandro	Citizen	15
4	Chan Siu Ki	South China	12
4	Ling Cong	Happy Valley	12
4	Paul Ngue	Kitchee	12
7	Carlos Cáceres	Kitchee	11
8	Paulo	Fourway	10
9	Hao Shuang	Sheffield United	9
9	Chao Pengfei	Happy Valley	9
9	Caleb Ekwenugo	Fourway / NT Realty Wofoo Tai Po	9
9	Christian Annan	NT Realty Wofoo Tai Po	9
9	Godfred Karikari	Happy Valley	9

Only players scored ≥9 is shown.

== Stadia ==
Locations of the Hong Kong First Division League 2008–09 venues

Mong Kok Stadium and Hong Kong Stadium are the primary venue for the majority of the games. Some other stadiums also will be used, including Siu Sai Wan Sports Ground, Tai Po Sports Ground and Yuen Long Stadium.

NT Realty Wofoo Tai Po has successfully applied to use Tai Po Sports Ground for their 12 home games. TSW Pegasus also applied to use Yuen Long Stadium as their home ground, but the stadium's facilities and grass turf conditions could not be modified in time for this season. However, South China AA agreed to play away at Yuen Long Stadium on 5 October 2008. HKFA chairman Leung Hung Tak later claimed that three home games will be played at Yuen Long Stadium for TSW Pegasus this season.

Xiangxue Eisiti had suggested using a stadium in Shenzhen for their home games. But due to the poor quality of the facility, the HKFA deemed it unsuitable for the First Division. Its home games will now be staged either at Mong Kok Stadium or Siu Sai Wan Sports Ground instead.

Teams	Number of times used as home stadium				
Teams	HKS	MKS	SSWSG	TPSG	YLS
Citizen	1	10	1		
Convoy Sun Hei		12			
Eastern		12			
Fourway		12			
Happy Valley		12			
Kitchee		11	1		
Mutual		12			
NT Realty Wofoo Tai Po		3		9	
Sheffield United	1	11			
South China	6	6			
TSW Pegasus	1	8			3
Tuen Mun Progoal	1	11			
Xiangxue Eisiti		11	1		
Total	10	131	3	9	3

== See also ==
- 2008–09 Hong Kong Senior Challenge Shield
- 2008–09 Hong Kong League Cup
- 2008–09 Hong Kong FA Cup
- 2009 AFC Cup
