= 2008–09 Hong Kong League Cup =

Tournament details
- Country: Hong Kong
- Teams: 13

Final positions
- Champions: Convoy Sun Hei (4th title)
- Runners-up: TSW Pegasus

Tournament statistics
- Matches played: 12
- Goals scored: 40 (3.33 per match)
- Top goal scorer: (Brazil) Giovane (Convoy Sun Hei) (6 goals)

Hong Kong League Cup 2008–09 is the 9th Hong Kong League Cup.

All teams of Hong Kong First Division League 2008–09 will play in this competition.

== Calendar ==
Round	Date	Matches	Clubs
First round	20 February 2009 – 22 February 2009	5	13 → 8
Quarter-finals	7 March 2009 – 8 March 2009	4	8 → 4
Semi-finals	21 March 2009 – 22 March 2009	2	4 → 2
Final	4 April 2009	1	2 → 1

== Bracket ==
Quarter-finals
7 March - Mong Kok Stadium
South China	1
TSW Pegasus	2
7 March - Mong Kok Stadium
Tuen Mun Progoal	0
Eastern	2
8 March - Mong Kok Stadium
Kitchee (pen.)	0 (5)
Fourway	0 (3)
8 March - Mong Kok Stadium
Convoy Sun Hei	6
NT Realty Wofoo Tai Po	0

Semi-finals
21 March - Mong Kok Stadium
TSW Pegasus	3
Eastern	0
22 March - Mong Kok Stadium
Kitchee	0
Convoy Sun Hei (awarded)	3

Final
4 April - Mong Kok Stadium
TSW Pegasus	2 (2)
Convoy Sun Hei (pen.)	2 (4)

All times are local (UTC+8).

== First round ==
20 February 2009
15:00

Mutual	1 – 4	Eastern
Leung Tsz Chun 74'	Report	Akosah 62'; Alex 64', 83', 90'

Mong Kok Stadium
Attendance: 203
Referee: Wong Po On

21 February 2009
14:00

NT Realty Wofoo Tai Po	5 – 0	Xiangxue Eisiti
Lee Wai Lim 16'; So Loi Keung 30'; Annan 41'; Caleb 69'; Ye Jia 78'	Report

Mong Kok Stadium
Attendance: 1,127
Referee: Chan Shui Hung

21 February 2009
16:00

Citizen	1 – 2 (a.e.t.)	Convoy Sun Hei
Paulinho 60'	Report	Lau Chi Keung 78'; Giovane 120'

Mong Kok Stadium
Attendance: 1,127
Referee: Ng Chiu Kok

22 February 2009
14:00

Happy Valley	1 – 2	Fourway
Chao Pengfei 60'	Report	Lam Hok Hei 31'; Minga 90'

Mong Kok Stadium
Attendance: 967
Referee: Wong Chi Tang

22 February 2009
16:00

TSW Pegasus	5 – 0	Sheffield United
Nakamura 12', 45'; Xiao Xiao 46' (o.g.); Itaparica 64'; Cheng Siu Wai 85'	Report

Mong Kok Stadium
Attendance: 967
Referee: Lui Siu Chuen

== Quarter-finals ==
7 March 2009
14:00

Tuen Mun Progoal	0 – 2	Eastern
	Report	Wong Chun Yue 60'; Zeng Qixiang 86'

Mong Kok Stadium
Attendance: 2,421
Referee: Liu Kwok Man

7 March 2009
16:00

South China	1 – 2	TSW Pegasus
Au Yeung Yiu Chung 19'	Report	Lee Hong Lim 45'; Nakamura 56'

Mong Kok Stadium
Attendance: 2,421
Referee: Wong Chi Tang

8 March 2009
14:00

Convoy Sun Hei	6 – 0	NT Realty Wofoo Tai Po
Carlos 30'; Giovane 39' (pen.), 61', 73'; Lo Chi Kwan 47'; Bamnjo 51'	Report

Mong Kok Stadium
Attendance: 1,256
Referee: Lui Siu Chuen

8 March 2009
16:00

Kitchee	0 – 0 (a.e.t.)	Fourway
	Report
Penalties
Cáceres (penalty scored); Zamudio (penalty scored); Chan Man Fai (penalty scored); Díaz (penalty scored); Nanmi (penalty scored)	5 – 3	(penalty scored) Paulo; (penalty missed) Lau Ka Shing; (penalty scored) Yu Yang; (penalty scored) Sui Weijie

Mong Kok Stadium
Attendance: 1,256
Referee: Ng Chiu Kok

== Semi-finals ==
21 March 2009
15:00

TSW Pegasus	3 – 0	Eastern
Itaparica 69', 73'; Machado 81' (o.g.)	Report

Mong Kok Stadium
Attendance: 1,235
Referee: Ng Kai Lam

22 March 2009
15:00

Kitchee	0 – 3 (awarded)	Convoy Sun Hei
	Report	Lau Chi Keung 54'

Mong Kok Stadium
Attendance: 1,176
Referee: Cheng Oi Cho
- Kitchee used more than the allowed maximum of 6 foreign players after the 89th minute. Since it did not affect the final qualification of Convoy Sun Hei, the decision which awarding a 3–0 win to Convoy Sun Hei, was made on 20 April 2009, the date after the final of this competition.

== Final ==
4 April 2009
15:00

TSW Pegasus	2 – 2 (a.e.t.)	Convoy Sun Hei
Nakamura 21'; Carlos 36' (o.g.)	Report; Report in Chinese	Giovane 9', 47'
Penalties
Itaparica (penalty missed); Cheung Kin Fung (penalty scored); Fofo (penalty missed); Luk Koon Pong (penalty scored)	2 – 4	(penalty scored) Giovane; (penalty scored) Lau Chi Keung; (penalty scored) Chan Yiu Lun; (penalty scored) Lai Kai Cheuk

Mong Kok Stadium
Attendance: 2,684
Referee: Ng Chiu Kok

TSW Pegasus	Convoy Sun Hei

TSW PEGASUS:
GK	1	(Brazil) Oliveira
RB	6	(Hong Kong) Luk Koon Pong
CB	2	(Brazil) Beto	(yellow card) 70'
CB	5	(Ghana) Wisdom Fofo Agbo	(yellow card) 90'
LB	4	(China) Deng Jinghuang
CM	10	(Cameroon) Eugene Mbome
CM	26	(Hong Kong) Lai Yiu Cheong		(substituted off) 63'
RW	11	(Brazil) Itaparica
LW	17	(Hong Kong) Lee Hong Lim		(substituted off) 97'
SS	19	(Hong Kong) Cheng Siu Wai (c)		(substituted off) 80'
CF	30	(Japan) Yuto Nakamura
Substitutes:
GK	23	(Hong Kong) Li Jian
DF	3	(Hong Kong) Lin Junsheng
DF	21	(Hong Kong) Lai Man Fei
MF	13	(Hong Kong) Cheung Kin Fung		(substituted on) 97'
MF	15	(Hong Kong) Yuen Kin Man		(substituted on) 63'
MF	16	(Cameroon) Louis Berty Ayock
MF	20	(Hong Kong) Yip Chi Ho		(substituted on) 80'
Coach:
(Brazil) Ricardo

CONVOY SUN HEI:
GK	1	(China) Wei Zhao
RB	5	(Brazil) Carlos	(yellow card) 82' (yellow-red card) 119'
CB	26	(Brazil) Roberto
CB	33	(Hong Kong) Cristiano Cordeiro (c)	(yellow card) 32'
LB	3	(Hong Kong) Chung Kin Hei		(substituted off) 76'
RM	9	(Hong Kong) Chan Yiu Lun
CM	10	(Hong Kong) Lau Chi Keung	(yellow card) 41'
CM	16	(Hong Kong) Lai Kai Cheuk
LM	14	(Hong Kong) Lo Chi Kwan		(substituted off) 73'
RF	22	(Brazil) Giovane	(yellow card) 45'
LF	24	(Japan) Tomoaki Seino		(substituted off) 69'
Substitutes:
GK	17	(Hong Kong) Cheung King Wah
GK	21	(Hong Kong) Chan Ka Ki
DF	2	(Hong Kong) Tseng Siu Wing	(yellow card) 76' (yellow-red card) 113'	(substituted on) 76'
DF	12	(Hong Kong) Tse Man Wing		(substituted on) 73'
DF	23	(Hong Kong) Lai Ka Fai
MF	7	(Hong Kong) Chu Siu Kei	(yellow card) 120'	(substituted on) 69'
FW	20	(Hong Kong) Kwok Yue Hung
Coach:
(Hong Kong) Leslie Santos

MATCH OFFICIALS

- Assistant referees:
  - Pau Sai Yin
  - Poon Ming Fai
- Fourth official: Wong Po On

MATCH RULES

- 90 minutes.
- 30 minutes of extra-time if necessary.
- Penalty shoot-out if scores still level.
- Seven named substitutes
- Maximum of 3 substitutions.

== Scorers ==
The scorers in the 2008–09 Hong Kong League Cup are as follows:

6 goals

- (Brazil) Giovane (Convoy Sun Hei)

4 goals

- (Japan) Yuto Nakamura (TSW Pegasus)

3 goals

- (Brazil) Itaparica (TSW Pegasus)
- (Nigeria) Alex (Eastern)

2 goals

- (Hong Kong) Lau Chi Keung (Convoy Sun Hei)

1 goal

- (Nigeria) Caleb Ekwenugo (NT Realty Wofoo Tai Po)
- (Brazil) Paulinho (Citizen)
- (Hong Kong) Chao Pengfei (Happy Valley)
- (Republic of the Congo) Edson Minga (Fourway)
- (Ghana) Christian Annan (NT Realty Wofoo Tai Po)
- (Hong Kong) Au Yeung Yiu Chung (South China)
- (Cameroon) Julius Akosah (Eastern)
- (Hong Kong) Leung Tsz Chun (Mutual)
- (China) Zeng Qixiang (Eastern)
- (Hong Kong) Lee Hong Lim (TSW Pegasus)
- (Hong Kong) Lee Wai Lim (NT Realty Wofoo Tai Po)
- (Cameroon) Wilfred Bamnjo (Convoy Sun Hei)
- (Hong Kong) So Loi Keung (NT Realty Wofoo Tai Po)
- (Hong Kong) Lam Hok Hei (Fourway)
- (Hong Kong) Cheng Siu Wai (TSW Pegasus)
- (Hong Kong) Wong Chun Yue (Eastern)
- (China) Ye Jia (NT Realty Wofoo Tai Po)
- (Brazil) Carlos (Convoy Sun Hei)
- (Hong Kong) Lo Chi Kwan (Convoy Sun Hei)

Own goals

- (China) Xiao Xiao (Sheffield United)
- (Brazil) Machado (Eastern)
- (Brazil) Carlos (Convoy Sun Hei)
