= 2008–09 Hong Kong FA Cup =

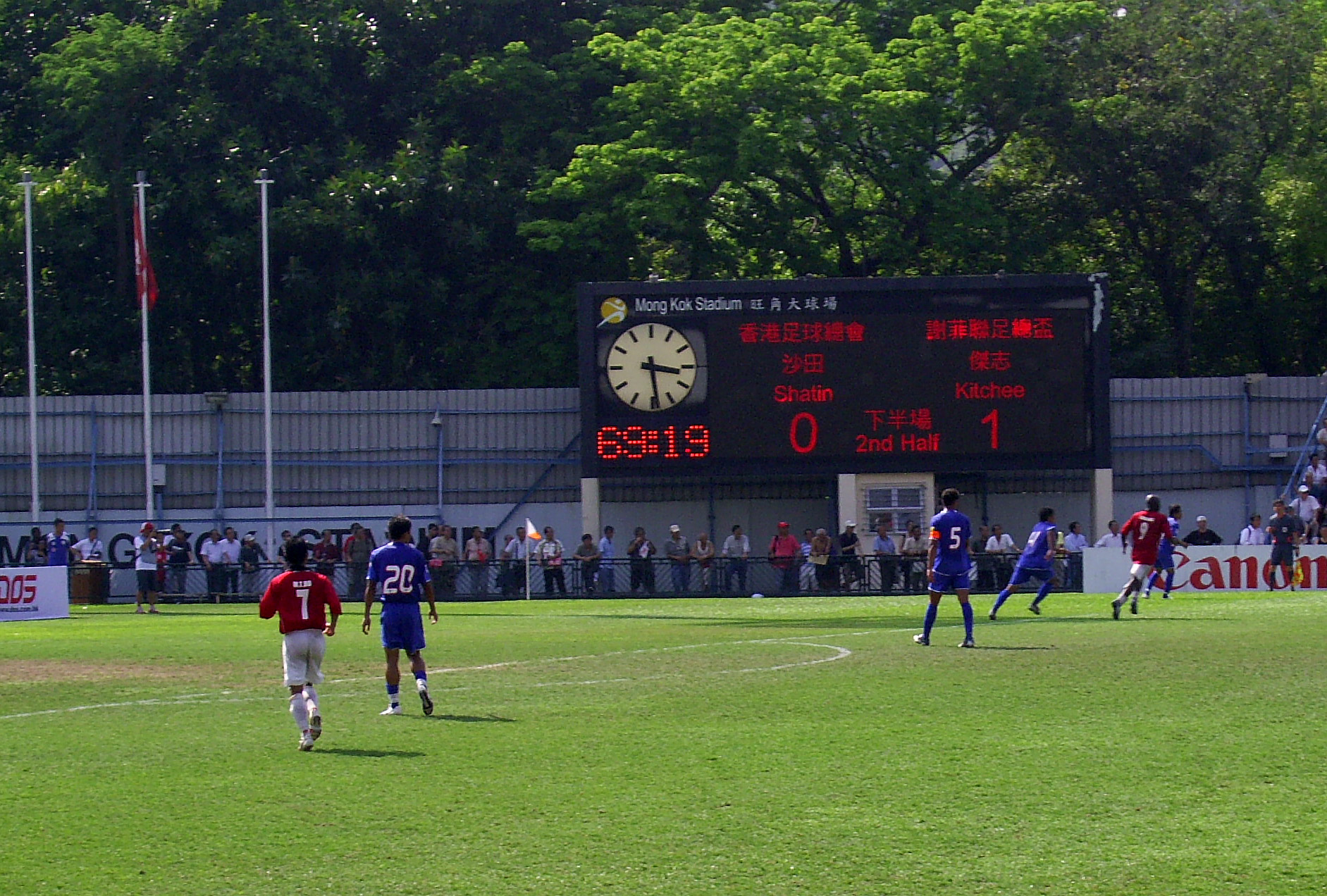
- Kitchee SC playing against Shatin SA at the Mongkok Stadium.

Tournament details
- Country: Hong Kong
- Teams: 15

Final positions
- Champions: NT Realty Wofoo Tai Po (1st title)
- Runners-up: TSW Pegasus

Tournament statistics
- Matches played: 14
- Goals scored: 52 (3.71 per match)
- Top goal scorer: (Hong Kong) Chan Siu Ki (South China) (6 goals)

Awards
- Best player: (Hong Kong) Lee Wai Lim (NT Realty Wofoo Tai Po)

2008–09 Hong Kong FA Cup (officially named Sheffield United F.A. Cup due to sponsorship from Chengdu Blades F.C. Ltd, Chinese: 錫菲聯足總盃 — a Chinese club owned at the time by the English football club) was the 35th season of the Hong Kong FA Cup.

NT Realty Wofoo Tai Po won the title, and qualified for the 2010 AFC Cup as TSW Pegasus won the 2008–09 Hong Kong Senior Challenge Shield but was not eligible to compete in Asian competitions as not a full member of the Hong Kong Football Association.

== Calendar ==
Round	Date	Matches	Clubs
First Round	12 May 2009–17 May 2009	7	15 → 8
Quarter-finals	26 May 2009–28 May 2009	4	8 → 4
Semi-finals	30 May 2009–31 May 2009	2	4 → 2
Final	6 June 2009	1	2 → 1

== Bracket ==
The draw was made on 17 April 2009.

First round
Citizen
bye
14 May - Mong Kok Stadium
Eastern	0
TSW Pegasus	1
14 May - Mong Kok Stadium
South China	7
Xiangxue Eisiti	0
16 May - Mong Kok Stadium
Happy Valley	7
Mutual	1
17 May - Mong Kok Stadium
NT Realty Wofoo Tai Po	3
Tuen Mun Progoal	0
17 May - Mong Kok Stadium
Shatin	0
Kitchee	3
12 May - Mong Kok Stadium
Fourway	1
Convoy Sun Hei	0
16 May - Mong Kok Stadium
Sheffield United (a.e.t.)	5
Sham Shui Po	3

Quarter-finals
26 May - Mong Kok Stadium
Citizen	2
TSW Pegasus (a.e.t.)	3
26 May - Mong Kok Stadium
South China (a.e.t.)	3
Happy Valley	1
28 May - Siu Sai Wan Sports Ground
NT Realty Wofoo Tai Po	2
Kitchee	1
28 May - Siu Sai Wan Sports Ground
Fourway	5
Sheffield United	0

Semi-finals
30 May - Mong Kok Stadium
TSW Pegasus	3
South China	2
31 May - Mong Kok Stadium
NT Realty Wofoo Tai Po	1
Fourway	0

Final
6 June - Hong Kong Stadium
TSW Pegasus	2
NT Realty Wofoo Tai Po	4

== First round ==
12 May 2009
20:00

Fourway	1 – 0	Convoy Sun Hei
Yau Kam Leung 90'	Report

Mong Kok Stadium
Attendance: 351
Referee: Wong Chi Tang

14 May 2009
18:00

Eastern	0 – 1	TSW Pegasus
	Report	Lee Hong Lim 77'

Mong Kok Stadium
Attendance: 1,143
Referee: Wong Po On

14 May 2009
20:00

South China	7 – 0	Xiangxue Eisiti
Kwok Kin Pong 7', 17'; Chan Siu Ki 20', 49'; Detinho 27', 42', 86'	Report

Mong Kok Stadium
Attendance: 1,143
Referee: Tong Kui Sum

16 May 2009
14:00

Sheffield United	5 – 3 (a.e.t.)	Sham Shui Po
Lo Kong Wai 47' (o.g.); Wu Jiarui 89', 116'; Lu Di 97'; Hao Shuang 119'	Report	Hung Jing Yip 9'; Fong Pak Lun 45'; Wong Wing Sum 120'

Mong Kok Stadium
Attendance: 756
Referee: Chan Shui Hung

16 May 2009
16:00

Happy Valley	7 – 1	Mutual
Fagner 7'; Diego 27'; Chao Pengfei 51'; Poon Man Tik 68'; Gerard 75'; Ling Cong 78', 83'	Report	Victor 36'

Mong Kok Stadium
Attendance: 756
Referee: Lui Siu Chuen

17 May 2009
14:00

Shatin	0 – 3	Kitchee
	Report	Cáceres 41', 90'; Ngue 47'

Mong Kok Stadium
Attendance: 1,203
Referee: Wong Po On

17 May 2009
16:00

NT Realty Wofoo Tai Po	3 – 0	Tuen Mun Progoal
Caleb 18', 27' (pen.); Annan 41'	Report

Mong Kok Stadium
Attendance: 1,203
Referee: Ng Chiu Kok

== Quarter-finals ==
26 May 2009
18:00

Citizen	2 – 3 (a.e.t.)	TSW Pegasus
Ju Yingzhi 22'; Xu Deshuai 27'	Report	Cheng Siu Wai 44'; Itaparica 90+'; Mbome 119'

Mong Kok Stadium
Attendance: 1,304
Referee: Ng Chiu Kok

26 May 2009
20:00

South China	3 – 1 (a.e.t.)	Happy Valley
Au Yeung Yiu Chung 81'; Chan Siu Ki 99', 115'	Report	Ling Cong 34'

Mong Kok Stadium
Attendance: 1,304
Referee: Wong Po On

28 May 2009
14:00

Fourway	5 – 0	Sheffield United
Paulo 36', 75'; Minga 64', 78', 82'	Report

Siu Sai Wan Sports Ground
Attendance: 316
Referee: Wong Chi Tang

28 May 2009
16:00

NT Realty Wofoo Tai Po	2 – 1	Kitchee
So Loi Keung 30'; Ye Jia 79'	Report	Cupla 7'

Siu Sai Wan Sports Ground
Attendance: 316
Referee: Pau Sai Yin

== Semi-finals ==
30 May 2009
15:30

TSW Pegasus	3 – 2	South China
Itaparica 21' (pen.), 50'; Lee Hong Lim 34'	Report	Chan Siu Ki 24', 81' (pen.)

Mong Kok Stadium
Attendance: 2,490
Referee: Wong Chi Tang

31 May 2009
15:30

NT Realty Wofoo Tai Po	1 – 0	Fourway
Lee Wai Lim 12' (pen.)	Report

Mong Kok Stadium
Attendance: 812
Referee: Ng Chiu Kok

== Final ==
6 June 2009
15:00

TSW Pegasus	2 – 4	NT Realty Wofoo Tai Po
Itaparica 16'; Nakamura 28'	Report; Report in Chinese	Caleb 2'; Sze Kin Wai 4'; Lee Wai Lim 46'; Annan 72'

Hong Kong Stadium
Attendance: 4,042
Referee: Ng Kai Lam

TSW Pegasus	NT Realty Wofoo Tai Po

TSW PEGASUS:
GK	23	(Hong Kong) Li Jian
RB	6	(Hong Kong) Luk Koon Pong
CB	5	(Ghana) Wisdom Fofo Agbo (c)	(yellow card) 46'
CB	2	(Brazil) Beto
LB	4	(China) Deng Jinghuang	(yellow card) 10'
RM	11	(Brazil) Itaparica
CM	10	(Cameroon) Eugene Mbome
CM	16	(Cameroon) Louis Berty Ayock		(substituted off) 62'
LM	17	(Hong Kong) Lee Hong Lim		(substituted off) 70'
SS	19	(Hong Kong) Cheng Siu Wai		(substituted off) 64'
CF	30	(Japan) Yuto Nakamura
Substitutes:
GK	12	(Hong Kong) Leung Cheuk Cheung
DF	21	(Hong Kong) Lai Man Fei
MF	13	(Hong Kong) Cheung Kin Fung		(substituted on) 70'
MF	15	(Hong Kong) Yuen Kin Man		(substituted on) 62'
MF	20	(Hong Kong) Yip Chi Ho
MF	26	(Hong Kong) Lai Yiu Cheong
FW	8	(Japan) Masayuki Okano		(substituted on) 64'
Coach:
(Brazil) Ricardo

NT REALTY WOFOO TAI PO:
GK	1	(Hong Kong) Li Hon Ho
RB	3	(Hong Kong) Chan Sze Wing
CB	10	(Hong Kong) Lui Chi Hing
CB	21	(Hong Kong) Chan Yuk Chi (c)	(yellow card) 18'
LB	14	(Hong Kong) Kwok Wing Sun
DM	5	(Brazil) Júnior	(yellow card) 78'
RM	9	(Hong Kong) Lee Wai Lim		(substituted off) 76'
LM	17	(Hong Kong) So Loi Keung	(yellow card) 83'
AM	11	(Hong Kong) Sze Kin Wai		(substituted off) 90'
CF	15	(Ghana) Christian Annan
CF	25	(Nigeria) Caleb Ekwenugo		(substituted off) 79'
Substitutes:
GK	33	(Hong Kong) Pang Tsz Kin
DF	4	(Hong Kong) Chiu Chun Kit		(substituted on) 76'
DF	19	(Hong Kong) Wong Tak Ho
MF	8	(Hong Kong) So Hong Shing		(substituted on) 90'
MF	22	(Hong Kong) Sin Shing Chun
FW	23	(China) Ye Jia	(yellow card) 88'	(substituted on) 79'
FW	31	(Hong Kong) Li Shu San
Coaches:
(Hong Kong) Chan Ho Yin (Hong Kong) Cheung Po Chun

MATCH OFFICIALS

- Assistant referees:
  - Wong Po On
  - Poon Ming Fai
- Fourth official: Lui Siu Chuen

MATCH RULES

- 90 minutes.
- 30 minutes of extra-time if necessary.
- Penalty shoot-out if scores still level.
- Seven named substitutes
- Maximum of 3 substitutions.

== Scorers ==
The scorers in the 2008–09 Hong Kong FA Cup are as follows:

6 goals

- (Hong Kong) Chan Siu Ki (South China)

4 goals

- (Brazil) Itaparica (TSW Pegasus)

3 goals

- (Brazil) Detinho (South China)
- (China) Ling Cong (Happy Valley)
- (Republic of the Congo) Edson Minga (Fourway)
- (Nigeria) Caleb Ekwenugo (NT Realty Wofoo Tai Po)

2 goals

- (China) Wu Jiarui (Sheffield United)
- (Chile) Carlos Cáceres (Kitchee)
- (Hong Kong) Kwok Kin Pong (South China)
- (Ghana) Christian Annan (NT Realty Wofoo Tai Po)
- (Hong Kong) Lee Wai Lim (NT Realty Wofoo Tai Po)
- (Hong Kong) Lee Hong Lim (TSW Pegasus)
- (Brazil) Paulo (Fourway)

1 goal

- (China) Hao Shuang (Sheffield United)
- (China) Lu Di (Sheffield United)
- (Cameroon) Paul Ngue (Kitchee)
- (Uruguay) Luis Cupla (Kitchee)
- (Hong Kong) Yau Kam Leung (Fourway)
- (Hong Kong) Cheng Siu Wai (TSW Pegasus)
- (Cameroon) Eugene Mbome (TSW Pegasus)
- (Japan) Yuto Nakamura (TSW Pegasus)
- (Brazil) Diego (Happy Valley)
- (Hong Kong) Gerard Ambassa Guy (Happy Valley)
- (Hong Kong) Chao Pengfei (Happy Valley)
- (Brazil) Fagner (Happy Valley)
- (Hong Kong) Poon Man Tik (Happy Valley)
- (Hong Kong) So Loi Keung (NT Realty Wofoo Tai Po)
- (Hong Kong) Sze Kin Wai (NT Realty Wofoo Tai Po)
- (China) Ye Jia (NT Realty Wofoo Tai Po)
- (Nigeria) Victor Inegbenoise (Mutual)
- (Hong Kong) Wong Wing Sum (Sham Shui Po)
- (Hong Kong) Fong Pak Lun (Sham Shui Po)
- (Hong Kong) Hung Jing Yip (Sham Shui Po)
- (China) Ju Yingzhi (Citizen)
- (Hong Kong) Xu Deshuai (Citizen)
- (Hong Kong) Au Yeung Yiu Chung (South China)

Own goals

- (Hong Kong) Lo Kong Wai (Sham Shui Po)

== Prizes ==
Top Scorer Award	Player of the Tournament
(Hong Kong) Chan Siu Ki (South China)	(Hong Kong) Lee Wai Lim (NT Realty Wofoo Tai Po)
