= 2008–09 Hong Kong Senior Shield =

Tournament details
- Country: Hong Kong
- Teams: 13

Final positions
- Champions: TSW Pegasus (1st title)
- Runners-up: Convoy Sun Hei

Tournament statistics
- Matches played: 12
- Goals scored: 35 (2.92 per match)
- Attendance: 20,625 (1,719 per match)
- Top goal scorer: (Cameroon) Guy Junior Ondoua (TSW Pegasus) (6 goals)

Awards
- Best player: (Brazil) Itaparica (TSW Pegasus)

Hong Kong Senior Shield 2008–09, officially named as Eisiti Senior Shield (Chinese: 上清飲高級組銀牌) due to the competition's sponsorship by Xiangxue Pharmaceutical, was the 107th season of one of the Asian oldest football knockout competition, Hong Kong Senior Shield. It was a knockout competition for all the teams of Hong Kong First Division League. The winner would qualify for AFC Cup 2010, if it was a full member of The Hong Kong Football Association.

The final match was held in Hong Kong Stadium on 21 December 2008. The tournament was won by TSW Pegasus, who beat Convoy Sun Hei 3–0 in the final, thanks to two goals from Guy Junior Ondoua and one from Beto. Since TSW Pegasus was not a full member of the Hong Kong Football Association, the AFC Cup 2010 qualification of it was not confirmed before the final of 2008–09 Hong Kong FA Cup.

== Calendar ==
Round	Date	Matches	Clubs
First round	22 November 2008 – 25 November 2008	5	13 → 8
Quarter-finals	29 November 2008 – 30 November 2008	4	8 → 4
Semi-finals	7 December 2008	2	4 → 2
Final	21 December 2008	1	2 → 1

== Bracket ==
Quarter-finals
29 November - Mong Kok Stadium
Eastern	0
TSW Pegasus	1
30 November - Mong Kok Stadium
South China	3
Citizen	1
29 November - Mong Kok Stadium
Kitchee	2
Convoy Sun Hei (a.e.t.)	3
30 November - Mong Kok Stadium
Fourway	2
Sheffield United	0

Semi-finals
7 December - Mong Kok Stadium
TSW Pegasus	2
South China	0
7 December - Mong Kok Stadium
Convoy Sun Hei (a.e.t.)	1
Fourway	0

Final
21 December - Hong Kong Stadium
TSW Pegasus	3
Convoy Sun Hei	0

All times are local (UTC+8).

== First round ==
22 November 2008
18:00

TSW Pegasus	4–0	Tuen Mun Progoal
Ondoua 19', 54', 75'; Hassan 37' (o.g.)	Report

Siu Sai Wan Sports Ground
Attendance: 269
Referee: Pau Sai Yin

22 November 2008
20:00

Convoy Sun Hei	4–0	Mutual
Giovane 48'; Chu Siu Kei 63'; Steve 68' (o.g.); Roberto 87'	Report

Siu Sai Wan Sports Ground
Attendance: 269
Referee: Chan Shui Hung

24 November 2008
18:00

Xiangxue Eisiti	0–4	Citizen
	Report	Chen Zhizhao 17'; Festus 50'; Xu Deshuai 56'; Sandro 76'

Mong Kok Stadium
Attendance: 286
Referee: Lui Siu Chuen

24 November 2008
20:00

Happy Valley	0–2	Sheffield United
	Report	Li Jianbin 7'; Hao Shuang 67'

Mong Kok Stadium
Attendance: 286
Referee: Wong Chi Tang

25 November 2008
20:00

NT Realty Wofoo Tai Po	1–2	Fourway
Joel 69'	Report	Caleb 38'; Minga 67'

Mong Kok Stadium
Attendance: 387
Referee: Ng Chiu Kok

== Quarter-finals ==
29 November 2008
14:00

Eastern	0–1	TSW Pegasus
	Report	Itaparica 63'

Mong Kok Stadium
Attendance: 1,609
Referee: Fung Ka Yu

29 November 2008
16:00

Kitchee	2–3 (a.e.t.)	Convoy Sun Hei
Ngue 32'; Cheng Lai Hin 108'	Report	Bamnjo 28', 95'; Giovane 106'

Mong Kok Stadium
Attendance: 1,609
Referee: Wong Po On

30 November 2008
14:00

Fourway	2–0	Sheffield United
Minga 2'; Lam Hok Hei 49'	Report

Mong Kok Stadium
Attendance: 2,374
Referee: Cheng Oi Cho

30 November 2008
16:00

South China	3–1	Citizen
Chan Siu Ki 2'; Schütz 61'; Maxwell 83'	Report	Paulinho 44'

Mong Kok Stadium
Attendance: 2,374
Referee: Liu Kwok Man

== Semi-finals ==
7 December 2008
14:00

Convoy Sun Hei	1–0 (a.e.t.)	Fourway
Chan Yiu Lun 103'	Report

Mong Kok Stadium
Attendance: 4,167
Referee: Ng Kai Lam

7 December 2008
16:00

TSW Pegasus	2–0	South China
Cheng Siu Wai 41'; Ondoua 90'	Report

Mong Kok Stadium
Attendance: 4,167
Referee: Ng Chiu Kok

== Final ==
21 December 2008
15:15

Convoy Sun Hei	0–3	TSW Pegasus
	Report; Report in Chinese	Beto 37'; Ondoua 52', 88'

Hong Kong Stadium
Attendance: 2,828
Referee: Liu Kwok Man

Convoy Sun Hei	TSW Pegasus

CONVOY SUN HEI:
GK	1	(China) Wei Zhao
RB	15	(Hong Kong) Lee Wai Lun
CB	5	(Brazil) Carlos
CB	33	(Hong Kong) Cristiano Cordeiro (c)
LB	3	(Hong Kong) Chung Kin Hei		(substituted off) 77'
DM	9	(Hong Kong) Lau Chi Keung		(substituted off) 69'
DM	27	(Cameroon) Wilfed Bamnjo	(yellow card) 53'
RM	14	(Hong Kong) Lo Chi Kwan		(substituted off) 60'
AM	26	(Brazil) Roberto	(yellow card) 39'
LM	7	(Hong Kong) Chu Siu Kei
CF	22	(Brazil) Giovane
Substitutes:
GK	21	(Hong Kong) Chan Ka Ki
DF	2	(Hong Kong) Tseng Siu Wing
DF	12	(Hong Kong) Tse Man Wing	(yellow card) 77'	(substituted on) 69'
DF	16	(Hong Kong) Lai Kai Cheuk		(substituted on) 77'
DF	23	(Hong Kong) Lai Ka Fai
MF	10	(Hong Kong) Chan Yiu Lun		(substituted on) 60'
FW	20	(Hong Kong) Kwok Yue Hung
Coach:
(Hong Kong) Yan Lik Kin

TSW PEGASUS:
GK	1	(Brazil) Oliveira
RB	6	(Hong Kong) Luk Koon Pong
CB	2	(Brazil) Beto
CB	15	(Hong Kong) Yuen Kin Man	(yellow card) 48'	(substituted off) 89'
LB	13	(Hong Kong) Cheung Kin Fung
RM	11	(Brazil) Itaparica		(substituted off) 86'
DM	16	(Cameroon) Louis Berty Ayock	(yellow card) 81'
DM	5	(Ghana) Wisdom Fofo Agbo	(yellow card) 69'
LM	28	(Hong Kong) Wong Chin Hung
SS	19	(Hong Kong) Cheng Siu Wai (c)		(substituted off) 79'
CF	9	(Cameroon) Guy Junior Ondoua
Substitutes:
GK	23	(Hong Kong) Li Jian
DF	3	(Hong Kong) Lin Junsheng
DF	4	(China) Deng Jianhuang
MF	9	(Hong Kong) Yeung Ching Kwong		(substituted on) 89'
MF	10	(Cameroon) Eugene Mbome		(substituted on) 86'
MF	20	(Hong Kong) Yip Chi Ho		(substituted on) 79'
MF	25	(China) Zeng Qixiang
Coach:
(Brazil) Ricardo

MATCH OFFICIALS

- Assistant referees:
  - Chan Shui Hung
  - Poon Ming Fai
- Fourth official: Wong Chi Tang

MATCH RULES

- 90 minutes.
- 30 minutes of extra-time if necessary.
- Penalty shoot-out if scores still level.
- Seven named substitutes
- Maximum of 3 substitutions.

== Scorers ==
The scorers in the 2008–09 Hong Kong Senior Shield are as follows:

6 goals

- (Cameroon) Guy Junior Ondoua (TSW Pegasus)

2 goals

- (Republic of the Congo) Edson Minga (Fourway)
- (Brazil) Giovane (Convoy Sun Hei)
- (Cameroon) Wilfred Bamnjo (Convoy Sun Hei)

1 goal

- (Hong Kong) Xu Deshuai (Citizen)
- (Brazil) Sandro (Citizen)
- (Nigeria) Festus Baise (Citizen)
- (Brazil) Paulinho (Citizen)
- (China) Chen Zhizhao (Citizen)
- (Cameroon) Paul Ngue (Kitchee)
- (Hong Kong) Cheng Lai Hin (Kitchee)
- (Brazil) Tales Schutz (South China)
- (Hong Kong) Chan Siu Ki (South China)
- (Brazil) Maxwell (South China)
- (Hong Kong) Lam Hok Hei (Fourway)
- (Nigeria) Caleb Ekwenugo (Fourway)
- (Hong Kong) Chan Yiu Lun (Convoy Sun Hei)
- (Hong Kong) Chu Siu Kei (Convoy Sun Hei)
- (Brazil) Roberto (Convoy Sun Hei)
- (China) Li Jianbin (Sheffield United)
- (China) Hao Shuang (Sheffield United)
- (Brazil) Joel (NT Realty Wofoo Tai Po)
- (Hong Kong) Cheng Siu Wai (TSW Pegasus)
- (Brazil) Itaparica (TSW Pegasus)
- (Brazil) Beto (TSW Pegasus)

Own goals

- (Nigeria) Ayo Hassan Raimi (Tuen Mun Progoal)
- (Hong Kong) Steve (Mutual)

== Prizes ==
Top Scorer Award	Player of the Tournament
(Cameroon) Guy Junior Ondoua (TSW Pegasus)	(Brazil) Itaparica (TSW Pegasus)
