= Ren Xin =

Chinese footballer

Personal information
- Full name: Ren Xin
- Date of birth: May 22, 1989 (age 37)
- Place of birth: Jiujiang, Jiangxi, China
- Height: 1.72 m (5 ft 7 1/2 in)
- Position: Defender

Senior career*
Years	Team	Apps	(Gls)
2008–2009	Xiangxue Eisiti	14	(1)
2009–2010	Shenzhen Ruby	19	(0)
2012	Shenzhen Fengpeng	8	(0)
2013	FK Sūduva	9	(0)
2014–2016	Jiangxi Liansheng	37	(1)
2017–2020	Zhejiang Yiteng	25	(0)
- * Club domestic league appearances and goals as of 31 December 2020

Ren Xin (Chinese: 任鑫; pinyin: Rén Xīn; born 22 May 1989) is a Chinese retired football player.

== Club career ==
Ren Xin started his professional football career at Shenzhen Ruby during the 2009 Chinese Super League season after graduating from the club's youth team and would make his debut in a league game against Guangzhou F.C. on March 28, 2009, in a 2–1 defeat. By the end of his debut season with the club he made nineteen league appearances and was on his way to establish himself as regular within the squad.

In season 2010 Ren Xin dropped in pecking order in the competition with newly joining players and seniors. After pre-season of 2011 Ren Xin didn't win a contract under new manager Philippe Troussier and left the club. In January 2012, Ren Xin joined Shenzhen Fengpeng but only got back into competitive matches in later stage after struggling with injury for the most time of season.

On 24 February 2017, Ren transferred to League One side Zhejiang Yiteng.

== Career statistics ==
Statistics accurate as of match played 31 December 2020.

Appearances and goals by club, season and competition
Club	Season	League			National Cup		League Cup		Continental		Total	
Club	Season	Division	Apps	Goals	Apps	Goals	Apps	Goals	Apps	Goals	Apps	Goals
Xiangxue Eisiti	2008–09	Hong Kong First Division League	14	1	0	0	1 (Note: Appearances in Hong Kong Senior Challenge Shield)	0	-		15	1
Shenzhen Ruby	2009	Chinese Super League	14	0	-		-		-		14	0
Shenzhen Ruby	2010	Chinese Super League	7	0	-		-		-		7	0
Shenzhen Ruby	Total		21	0	0	0	0	0	0	0	21	0
Shenzhen Fengpeng	2012	China League Two	8	0	-		-		-		8	0
FK Sūduva	2013	A Lyga	9	0	0	0	-		-		9	0
Jiangxi Liansheng	2014	China League Two	6	0	0	0	-		-		6	0
Jiangxi Liansheng	2015	China League One	16	1	2	1	-		-		18	2
Jiangxi Liansheng	2016	China League Two	15	0	1	0	-		-		16	0
Jiangxi Liansheng	Total		37	1	3	1	0	0	0	0	40	2
Zhejiang Yiteng	2018	China League One	10	0	0	0	-		-		10	0
Zhejiang Yiteng	2018	China League One	12	0	0	0	-		-		12	0
Zhejiang Yiteng	2019	China League Two	3	0	0	0	-		-		3	0
Zhejiang Yiteng	Total		25	0	0	0	0	0	0	0	25	0
Career total			114	2	3	1	1	0	0	0	118	3

== Honours ==
=== Club ===
Jiangxi Liansheng

- China League Two: 2014
