= Li Xin (footballer, born 1989) =

Chinese footballer

Li Xin 栗鑫
Personal information
- Date of birth: November 9, 1989 (age 36)
- Place of birth: Binzhou, Shandong, China
- Height: 1.75 m (5 ft 9 in)
- Position: Midfielder

Senior career*
Years	Team	Apps	(Gls)
2009–2011	Shenzhen Ruby	22	(0)
2012	Shenzhen Main Sports	21	(6)
2013	Shenzhen Fengpeng	13	(0)
2014	Meizhou Kejia	4	(0)
2015–2016	Shenzhen Renren	7	(0)
2017	Shenyang Dongjin	9	(0)
2018–2020	Shanxi Metropolis	16	(1)
- * Club domestic league appearances and goals as of 31 December 2020

Li Xin (Chinese: 栗鑫; born November 9, 1989) is a Chinese former professional football player.

== Club career ==
Li Xin would play for the Shenzhen Ruby youth team before he was loaned to their satellite team Xiangxue Eisiti, which would play as a foreign team in the 2008–09 Hong Kong First Division League. He would make his professional debut in a league game on 18 January 2009 against Eastern AA that ended in a 5-1 defeat that also saw him score his first goal. On his return he would be promoted to the senior Shenzhen team and during the 2009 Chinese Super League season and he would go on to make his debut in the club's first league game of the season against Shandong Luneng on March 22, 2009 in a 1-1 draw.

In 2015, Li signed for Shenzhen Renren.

== Career statistics ==
As of 31 December 2020.

Appearances and goals by club, season and competition
Club	Season	League			National Cup		Continental		Other		Total	
Club	Season	Division	Apps	Goals	Apps	Goals	Apps	Goals	Apps	Goals	Apps	Goals
Shenzhen Ruby	2009	Chinese Super League	13	0	-		-		-		13	0
Shenzhen Ruby	2010	Chinese Super League	9	0	-		-		-		9	0
Shenzhen Ruby	2011	Chinese Super League	0	0	0	0	-		-		0	0
Shenzhen Ruby	Total		22	0	0	0	0	0	0	0	22	0
Xiangxue Eisiti (loan)	2008-09	Hong Kong First Division League	5	1	0	0	0 (Note: Appearances in Hong Kong Senior Challenge Shield)	0	–		5	1
Shenzhen Main Sports	2012	CAFL	21	6	-		-		-		21	6
Shenzhen Fengpeng	2013	China League Two	13	0	1	0	-		-		14	0
Meizhou Kejia	2014	China League Two	4	0	0	0	-		-		4	0
Shenzhen Renren	2015	CAFL	?	?	-		-		-		?	?
Shenzhen Renren	2016	China League Two	7	0	0	0	-		-		7	0
Shenzhen Renren	Total		7	0	0	0	0	0	0	0	7	0
Shenyang Dongjin	2017	China League Two	9	0	0	0	-		-		9	0
Shanxi Metropolis	2018	CMCL	-		-		-		-		0	0
Shanxi Metropolis	2019	China League Two	16	1	1	0	-		-		17	1
Shanxi Metropolis	Total		16	1	1	0	0	0	0	0	17	1
Career total			97	8	2	0	0	0	0	0	99	8
