= Xu Yihai =

Chinese association football player

Personal information
- Date of birth: 2 March 1990 (age 36)
- Place of birth: Dalian, Liaoning, China
- Height: 1.88 m (6 ft 2 in)
- Positions: Defender; forward

Youth career
- 2007: Shenzhen Ruby

Senior career*
Years	Team	Apps	(Gls)
2008–2010	Shenzhen Ruby	11	(0)
2009	→ Xiangxue Eisiti (loan)	15	(1)
2011	Dalian Yifang	0	(0)
2012–2013	Qinghai Senke		(21)
2014	Nanjing Qianbao	9	(0)
2015–2016	Meixian Hakka	36	(2)
2017–2019	Beijing BSU	0	(0)
2017	→ Qingdao Jonoon (loan)	9	(0)
2019	→ Hebei Elite (loan)	12	(4)
2020–	Qinghai Oulu International	–	(–)
- * Club domestic league appearances and goals ‡ National team caps and goals as of 31 December 2020

Xu Yihai (simplified Chinese: 徐亿海; traditional Chinese: 徐億海; pinyin: Xú Yìhǎi; born 2 March 1990) is a Chinese footballer.

== Club career ==
Xu Yihai would play for the Shenzhen Ruby youth team before he was loaned to their satellite team Xiangxue Eisiti, which would play as a foreign team in the 2008–09 Hong Kong First Division League. He would make his professional debut in a league game on 9 September 2008 against Mutual FC that ended in a 0–0 draw. On his return he would be promoted to the senior Shenzhen team and go on to make his debut on 11 April 2009 in a league game against Dalian Shide F.C. in a 2–0 defeat. After two seasons he was allowed to leave the club to join second-tier football club Dalian Yifang where he did not make any senior appearances.

Xu joined third tier football club Qinghai Senke where the Head coach Song Lihui, moved him into a forward position, this move would revive his career when he was and become the clubs top goalscorer. His time at the club would come to end when the team disbanded due to financial difficulties at the end of the 2013 China League Two campaign.

== Career statistics ==
Statistics accurate as of match played 31 December 2020.

Appearances and goals by club, season and competition
Club	Season	League			National Cup		League Cup		Continental		Total	
Club	Season	Division	Apps	Goals	Apps	Goals	Apps	Goals	Apps	Goals	Apps	Goals
Shenzhen Ruby	2008	Chinese Super League	0	0	–		–		–		0	0
Shenzhen Ruby	2009	Chinese Super League	4	0	–		–		–		4	0
Shenzhen Ruby	2010	Chinese Super League	7	0	–		–		–		7	0
Shenzhen Ruby	Total		11	0	0	0	0	0	0	0	11	0
Xiangxue Eisiti (loan)	2008-09	Hong Kong First Division League	15	1	0	0	1 (Note: Appearances in Hong Kong Senior Challenge Shield)	0	–		16	1
Dalian Aerbin	2011	China League One	0	0	0	0	–		–		0	0
Qinghai Senke	2012	China League Two	27	15	–		–		–		27	15
Qinghai Senke	2013	China League Two		6	2	0	–		–			6
Qinghai Senke	Total			21	2	0	0	0	0	0		21
Nanjing Qianbao	2014	China League Two	9	0	–		–		–		9	0
Meixian Hakka	2015	China League Two	16	1	1	0	–		–		17	1
Meixian Hakka	2016	China League Two	20	1	1	0	–		–		21	1
Meixian Hakka	Total		36	2	2	0	0	0	0	0	38	2
Beijing BSU	2017	China League One	0	0	1	0	–		–		1	0
Qingdao Jonoon (loan)	2017	China League Two	9	0	0	0	–		–		9	0
Hebei Elite (loan)	2019	China League Two	12	4	0	0	–		–		14	4
Qinghai Oulu International	2020	CMCL	–		–		–		–		0	0
Career total			119	28	4	0	1	0	0	0	124	28
