= Gu Wenxiang =

Chinese footballer

Gu Wenxiang 顾文祥
Personal information
- Full name: Gu Wenxiang
- Date of birth: 8 February 1991 (age 35)
- Place of birth: Kunming, Yunnan, China
- Height: 1.77 m (5 ft 10 in)
- Position: Midfielder

Youth career
- 2001–2003: Yunnan Hongta
- 2007: Chengdu Blades
- 2010: Donghua University

Senior career*
Years	Team	Apps	(Gls)
2008–2009	Sheffield United (Hong Kong)	12	(6)
2011	Sichuan Dujiangyan Symbol	6	(1)
2012	Kunming Ruilong	5	(0)
2013–2014	Lijiang Jiayunhao	26	(7)
2015–2017	Jiangsu Suning	10	(0)
2017	Meizhou Meixian Techand	9	(1)
2018	Henan Jianye	1	(0)
2019–2021	Kunshan FC	27	(4)
- * Club domestic league appearances and goals as of 18 May 2022

Gu Wenxiang (Chinese: 顾文祥; born 8 February 1991) is the vice general manager of Chinese Super League club Yunnan Yukun and retired footballer who played as midfielder.

== Club career ==
In 2008, Gu Wenxiang started his professional footballer career with Sheffield United in the Hong Kong First Division League. He transferred to Chinese Super League club Jiangsu Sainty in February 2015. On 22 March 2015, Gu made his debut for Jiangsu in the 2015 Chinese Super League against Shandong Luneng Taishan, coming on as a substitute for Yang Hao in the 52nd minute.

Gu signed for China League Two side Meizhou Meixian Techand in July 2017. On 27 February 2018, Gu transferred to Chinese Super League club Henan Jianye. On 2 March 2019, Gu transferred to China League Two side Kunshan FC

Gu left professional football in 2022, after retirement he joined Yunnan Yukun as vice general manager in 2023.

== Career statistics ==
Statistics accurate as of match played 31 December 2020.

Appearances and goals by club, season and competition
Club	Season	League			National Cup		League Cup		Continental		Other		Total	
Club	Season	Division	Apps	Goals	Apps	Goals	Apps	Goals	Apps	Goals	Apps	Goals	Apps	Goals
Sheffield United HK (loan)	2008–09	Hong Kong First Division League	12	6	0	0	1	0	-		2 (Note: Appearances in Hong Kong Senior Challenge Shield)	0	15	6
Sichuan Dujiangyan Symbol	2011	China League Two	6	1	-		-		-		-		6	1
Kunming Ruilong	2012	China League Two	5	0	-		-		-		-		5	0
Lijiang Jiayunhao	2013	China League Two	14	4	-		-		-		-		14	4
Lijiang Jiayunhao	2014	China League Two	12	3	2	0	-		-		-		14	3
Lijiang Jiayunhao	Total		26	7	2	0	0	0	0	0	0	0	28	7
Jiangsu Suning	2015	Chinese Super League	3	0	1	1	-		-		-		4	1
Jiangsu Suning	2016	Chinese Super League	7	0	2	0	-		0	0	0 (Note: Appearances in Chinese FA Super Cup)	0	9	0
Jiangsu Suning	2017	Chinese Super League	0	0	0	0	-		1	0	0	0	1	0
Jiangsu Suning	Total		10	0	3	1	0	0	1	0	0	0	14	1
Meizhou Meixian Techand	2017	China League Two	9	1	0	0	-		-		-		9	1
Henan Jianye	2018	Chinese Super League	1	0	1	0	-		-		-		2	0
Kunshan F.C.	2019	China League Two	26	4	0	0	-		-		-		26	4
Kunshan F.C.	2020	China League One	0	0	1	0	-		-		-		1	0
Kunshan F.C.	Total		26	4	1	0	0	0	1	0	0	0	27	4
Career total			95	19	7	1	1	0	1	0	2	0	106	20

== Honours ==
=== Club ===
Jiangsu Sainty

- Chinese FA Cup: 2015
