= Min Jin =

Chinese footballer

Min Jin 闵劲
Personal information
- Date of birth: May 24, 1978 (age 48)
- Place of birth: Wuhan, China
- Height: 1.85 m (6 ft 1 in)
- Position: Midfielder

Youth career
- –1995: Hubei Mailyard
- 1996–1997: Chengdu Wuniu

Senior career*
Years	Team	Apps	(Gls)
1997–1999	Guangzhou Apollo	39	(7)
2000–2003	Shenyang Ginde	81	(11)
2004	Jiangsu Sainty	31	(4)
2005–2006	Shanghai Shenhua	3	(0)
2006	→Wuhan Yaqi (loan)		
2007–2009	Chengdu Blades		
2008	→ Lanwa Redbull (loan)	8	(2)
2008–2009	→ Sheff Utd (HKG) (loan)	19	(3)
2010	Hubei CTGU Kangtian		
- * Club domestic league appearances and goals as of 28 March 2009

Min Jin (simplified Chinese: 闵劲; traditional Chinese: 閔勁, born 24 May 1978 in Wuhan) is a Chinese football player.

== Club career ==
Min Jin would be loaned out to Sheffield United (Hong Kong) and play within the 2008–09 Hong Kong First Division League where he made his league debut for the club against South China on September 28, 2008 in a 2-0 defeat.
