= Tunde Seun Olokigbe =

Nigerian footballer

Personal information
- Date of birth: 9 July 1989 (age 37)
- Position: Midfielder

Senior career*
Years	Team	Apps	(Gls)
2008–2009	Shek Kip Mei	8	(2)
2010–2011	HKFC	10	(0)
- * Club domestic league appearances and goals

Tunde Seun Olokigbe (born 9 July 1989) is a Nigerian former professional footballer.

== Career statistics ==
=== Club ===
Appearances and goals by club, season and competition
Club	Season	League			Cup		League Cup		Other		Total	
Club	Season	Division	Apps	Goals	Apps	Goals	Apps	Goals	Apps	Goals	Apps	Goals
Shek Kip Mei	2008–09	First Division	8	2	1 (Note: Appearances in the Hong Kong FA Cup)	0	0	0	0	0	9	2
HKFC	2010–11	First Division	10	0	1	0	0	0	0	0	11	0
Career total			38	12	2	0	6	5	0	0	46	17
