= Eze Isiocha =

Nigerian footballer

Personal information
- Date of birth: 9 July 1987 (age 39)
- Place of birth: Nigeria
- Position: Forward

Senior career*
| Years | Team | Apps | (Gls) |
| 2005–2006 | El-Kanemi Warriors F.C. | | |
| 2006 | Enugu Rangers | | |
| 2006–2007 | Bayelsa United F.C. | | |
| 2007 | Sporting Clube de Goa | | |
| 2007–2008 | Citizen AA | | |
| 2008–2009 | Happy Valley AA | | (4) |
| 2013 | Nasarawa United F.C. | | |
- * Club domestic league appearances and goals

Eze Isiocha (Chinese: 伊薩; born 9 July 1987) is a Nigerian former professional footballer. He last played as a forward for Nasarawa United in the Nigeria Professional Football League in 2013. Isiocha also holds Hong Kong citizenship.

== Career ==
=== Earlier career ===
Isiocha began his senior professional career at the Nigerian Premier League side El-Kanemi Warriors in 2005, before moving to the Nigerian giants Enugu Rangers FC in 2006. He appeared for Rangers in the CAF Champions League matches.

Later in 2007, he signed with another Nigerian side Bayelsa United and played there until the club sacked seventeen out of thirty seven players including him, on its books for the 2007 football season.

=== Hong Kong ===
In 2007, Isiocha signed with Hong Kong Premier League side Citizen AA and won the 2007–08 Hong Kong FA Cup.

The number 9 emblazoned on the back of his jersey at Happy Valley AA, Isiocha was ready by the second round of the 2008–09 Hong Kong First Division League hosting Fourway, contributing a hat-trick in a 9–0 hammering of Mutual and finishing the season with four goals.

=== India ===
Isiocha came to India and signed with Goa based Sporting Clube de Goa during the middle of 2007. Few days later he lodged a complaint to FIFA, the world football governing body, claiming he had got a three-year contract but it was ended prematurely so they owed him money. In turn, FIFA asked the Flaming Orange to pay him but they denied it, threatening to take the case to the Court of Arbitration for Sports.

Isiocha, whose three-year contract with the club, beginning in 2007-08 was terminated after two months through the complaints to FIFA that he hadn't received his salary. Following investigations, FIFA asked the Goan club to pay. Peter Vaz, president of SCG, though said the club doesn't have to.

== Honours ==
Citizen AA

- Hong Kong FA Cup: 2007–08
