= Yu Yang (footballer, born 1983) =

Chinese footballer

Personal information
- Date of birth: 21 September 1983 (age 43)
- Height: 1.79 m (5 ft 10 in)
- Position: Left-back

Youth career
- –2003: Zhejiang Greentowen

Senior career*
| Years | Team | Apps | (Gls) |
| 2004 | Sichuan Golden Eagle | | |
| 2005 | Qingdao Hisense Real Estate | | |
| 2006–2008 | Hong Kong Rangers | 23 | (0) |
| 2008–2009 | Fourway | 20 | (2) |
| 2009–2010 | Happy Valley | 7 | (0) |
| Total | | 50 | (2) |
- * Club domestic league appearances and goals

Yu Yang (Chinese: 于洋; born 21 September 1983) is a former Chinese professional footballer.

== Arrest ==
In 2010, Yu was arrested for alleged bribery over match-fixing allegations.

== Career statistics ==
=== Club ===
Appearances and goals by club, season and competition
| Club | Season | League | | | Cup | | League Cup | | Other | | Total | |
| Club | Season | Division | Apps | Goals | Apps | Goals | Apps | Goals | Apps | Goals | Apps | Goals |
|---|---|---|---|---|---|---|---|---|---|---|---|---|
| Bulova Rangers | 2006–07 | First Division | 12 | 0 | 2 (Note: Appearances in the Hong Kong FA Cup) | 0 | 0 | 0 | 0 | 0 | 14 | 0 |
| Bulova Rangers | 2007–08 | First Division | 11 | 0 | 0 | 0 | 0 | 0 | 2 (Note: Appearances in the Hong Kong Senior Shield) | 0 | 13 | 0 |
| Bulova Rangers | Total | | 23 | 0 | 2 | 0 | 0 | 0 | 2 | 0 | 27 | 0 |
| Fourway | 2008–09 | First Division | 20 | 2 | 0 | 0 | 0 | 0 | 1 | 0 | 21 | 2 |
| Happy Valley | 2009–10 | First Division | 7 | 0 | 0 | 0 | 0 | 0 | 1 | 0 | 8 | 0 |
| Career total | | | 50 | 2 | 2 | 0 | 0 | 0 | 4 | 0 | 56 | 2 |
