= Heiner Backhaus =

German footballer

Personal information
- Date of birth: 4 February 1982 (age 44)
- Place of birth: Witten, West Germany
- Height: 1.86 m (6 ft 1 in)
- Position: Defensive midfielder

Youth career
- –1998: Schalke 04
- 1998–2000: Werder Bremen

Senior career*
Years	Team	Apps	(Gls)
2000–2001	Rot-Weiss Essen	21	(0)
2001–2002	Hannover 96	1	(0)
2002–2003	Union Berlin	8	(0)
2003	AEK Larnaca		
2004	Borussia Mönchengladbach II	2	(0)
2005	Arminia Bielefeld II	17	(0)
2006–2007	Kickers Offenbach	9	(0)
2007–2008	Valletta	27	(3)
2008	Kitchee	8	(3)
2009	FC Sachsen Leipzig	15	(1)
2009–2010	Olympiakos Nicosia	30	(0)
2010–2011	APOP Kinyras Peyias		
2011	1. FC Lokomotive Leipzig	5	(1)
2011	Ħamrun Spartans		
2011–2012	SC Westfalia Herne	3	(0)
2012	Fortuna Leipzig		
2012	Rabat Ajax	9	(0)
2013–2014	SV Blau-Weiß Farnstädt		
Total		155+	(8+)

Managerial career
- 2014–2019: FC Inter Leipzig
- 2019: Schwarz-Weiß Rehden
- 2020–2022: Rot-Weiß Koblenz
- 2022–2023: BFC Dynamo
- 2023–2025: Alemannia Aachen
- 2025–2026: Eintracht Braunschweig
- * Club domestic league appearances and goals

Heiner Backhaus (born 4 February 1982) is a German football coach and former professional player who most recently coached Eintracht Braunschweig. As a player, he was a journeyman who played as a defensive midfielder.

== Playing career ==
Born in Witten, West Germany, Backhaus made his professional debut with Hannover 96 on 12 August 2001, against SpVgg Unterhaching, on the 61st minute replacing Nebojša Krupniković.

He played for Rot-Weiss Essen, 1. FC Union Berlin, Borussia Mönchengladbach, DSC Arminia Bielefeld and Kickers Offenbach in Germany, and AEK Larnaca in Cyprus. He played for Valletta from summer 2007 but left the club at the end of the season, after the championship success to join Kitchee SC of Hong Kong.

Furthermore, Backhaus had contracts as a player in Saudi Arabia, Syria and Lebanon.

== Honours ==
Valletta

- Maltese Premier League: 2007–08
