= Lu Di =

Chinese swimmer

Personal information
- Born: 15 October 1975 (age 50)

Sport
- Sport: Swimming

Lu Di (born 15 October 1975) is a Chinese swimmer. She competed in two events at the 1992 Summer Olympics.
