= Ling Cong =

Chinese footballer

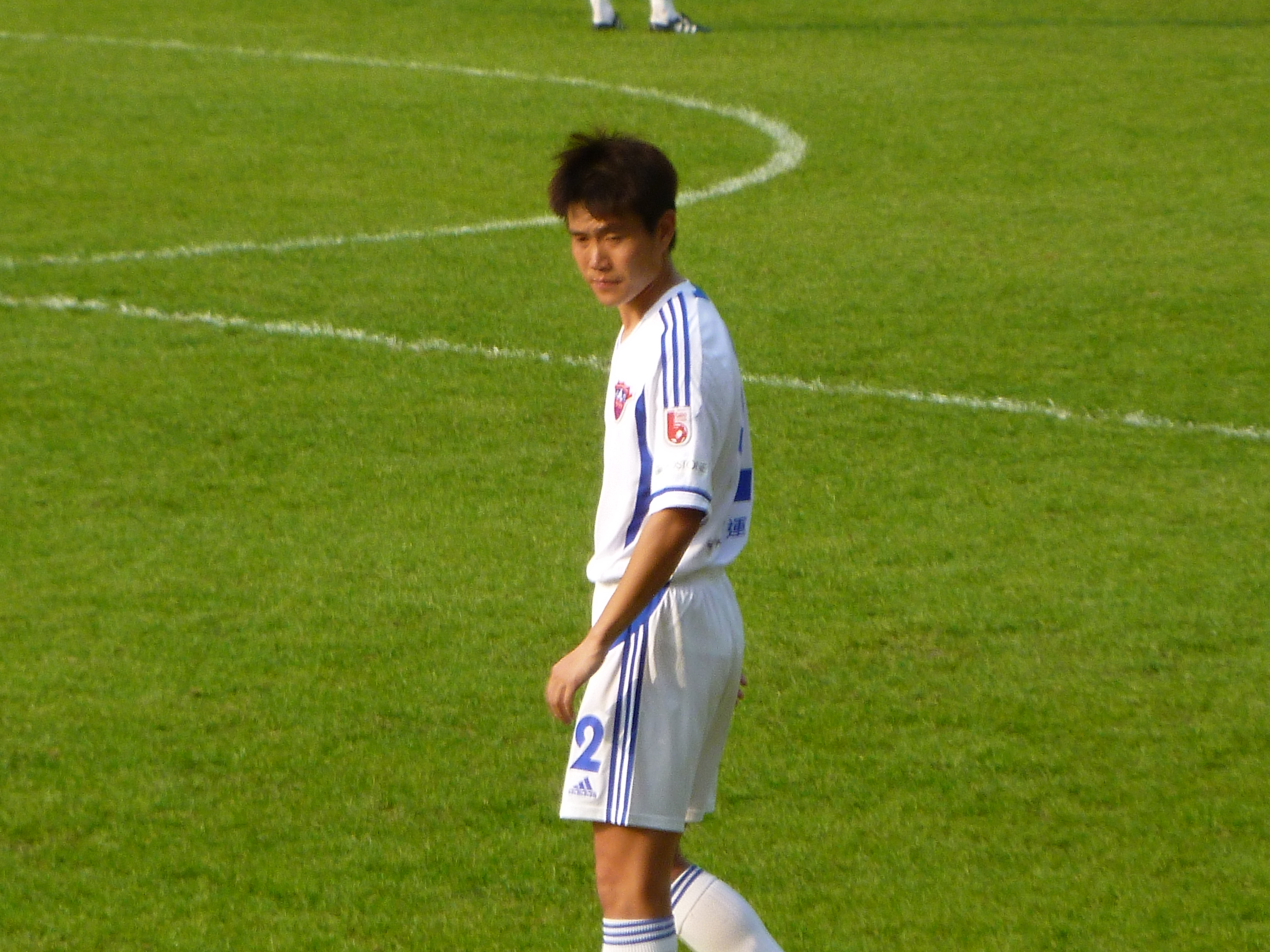

Personal information
- Full name: Ling Cong
- Date of birth: 28 February 1983 (age 43)
- Place of birth: Shenyang, Liaoning, China
- Height: 1.80 m (5 ft 11 in)
- Position: Midfielder

Senior career*
Years	Team	Apps	(Gls)
2003	Shenyang Ginde	0	(0)
2005–2008	Lanwa	39	(10)
2008–2010	Happy Valley	36	(18)
2010–2011	Sun Hei	12	(1)
2011–2014	Tuen Mun	32	(6)
- * Club domestic league appearances and goals as of 30 October 2012

Ling Cong (Chinese: 凌琮) is a former Chinese professional footballer who played as a midfielder.

== Club career ==
=== Happy Valley ===
In the 2008–09 season, Ling Cong scored 15 goals for Happy Valley and was the club's top scorer.

On 5 May 2010, Ling Cong was questioned by the Independent Commission Against Corruption over match fixing. He missed the club's training but team official said he pulled a muscle. On 7 May, Ling Cong said he was questioned for information but he was not arrested and he had nothing to do with the case. It was a mistake for the media to report that he was arrested and he worried about his future in Hong Kong football.

=== Sun Hei ===
Ling Cong joined Sun Hei for the 2010–11 Hong Kong First Division League.

=== Tuen Mun ===
Ling Cong joined Tuen Mun for the 2011–12 Hong Kong First Division League season. On 23 October 2011, Lin Cong scored a hat-trick and helped Tuen Mun beat Sham Shui Po 6:2.

On 30 October 2012, due to the divestment of Tuen Mun president Chan Keung, various key players, including Ling Cong, and the whole coaching team were released by the club.
