= Gustavo Zamudio =

Chilean footballer (born 1986)

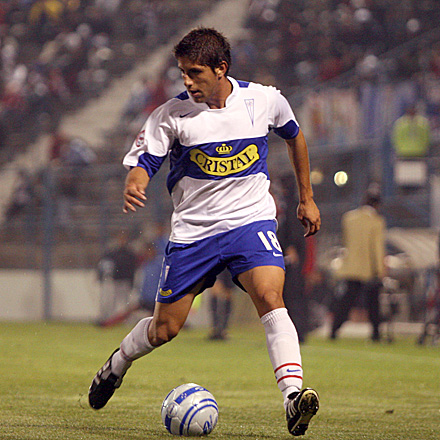

Personal information
- Full name: Gustavo David Zamudio Veloso
- Date of birth: April 11, 1986 (age 40)
- Place of birth: Viña del Mar, Chile
- Height: 5 ft 11 in (1.80 m)
- Position: Midfielder

Senior career*
Years	Team	Apps	(Gls)
2005–2012	Universidad Católica	1	(0)
2005	→ Deportes La Serena (loan)	1	(0)
2006	→ Magallanes (loan)	14	(2)
2007	→ Coquimbo Unido (loan)	18	(3)
2008	→ San Luis (loan)	9	(2)
2008–2009	→ Kitchee (loan)	29	(10)
2012–2013	Rochester Rhinos	14	(0)
2014–2015	Rangers	11	(0)
2016–2017	Malleco Unido	40	(2)
Total		137	(19)
- * Club domestic league appearances and goals

Gustavo David Zamudio Veloso (born April 11, 1986) is a Chilean former professional footballer who played as a midfielder. He took to football while attending Universidad Católica, and played for several teams of Chile, Hong Kong and the United States.
