= Hugues Nanmi =

Cameroonian footballer

Nanmi
Personal information
- Full name: Hugues Naponick Nanmi
- Date of birth: 27 April 1983 (age 43)
- Place of birth: Yaounde, Cameroon
- Height: 1.81 m (5 ft 11 1/2 in)
- Position: Defender

Senior career*
Years	Team	Apps	(Gls)
2006–2008	Persikota Tangerang		
2008–2009	Kitchee		
2009–2010	Tai Chung		
2010–2011	Tai Po		
2011–2012	NSÍ Runavík		
2012–2013	Persikabo Bogor		
- * Club domestic league appearances and goals as of 25 January 2010

Hugues Naponick Nanmi, commonly known as Namni (born 27 April 1983), is a Cameroonian former footballer. He has earlier played for Persikota Tangerang and Persikabo Bogor in Indonesia, Kitchee in Hong Kong, Tai Chung in Hong Kong and Tai Po in Hong Kong.
