= Enrique Díaz (footballer, born 1982) =

Uruguayan footballer

Personal information
- Full name: Enrique David Díaz Velázquez
- Date of birth: 4 September 1982 (age 44)
- Place of birth: Salto, Uruguay
- Height: 1.92 m (6 ft 4 in)
- Position: Centre back

Team information
- Current team: Aurora (manager)

Senior career*
Years	Team	Apps	(Gls)
2002	Progreso		
2003	Salto		
2004–2005	Atlético Mexiquense	33	(1)
2006–2007	Cerrito	10	(0)
2007–2008	Bella Vista	17	(0)
2008–2009	Kitchee	22	(1)
2010	Zamora	8	(0)
2011–2013	Blooming	69	(4)
2014	San José	20	(1)
2014–2018	Wilstermann	118	(7)
2019–2020	Aurora	43	(2)
2021	Independiente Petrolero	25	(1)
2022	Real Tomayapo	14	(0)
2022–2024	Independiente Petrolero	81	(2)

Managerial career
- 2026–: Aurora
- * Club domestic league appearances and goals

Enrique David Díaz Velázquez (born 4 September 1982) is a Uruguayan footballer who played as a centre back. He is the current manager of Bolivian club Aurora.
