= Beto (footballer, born 1984) =

Brazilian footballer

Personal information
- Full name: Roberto Fronza
- Date of birth: 10 July 1984 (age 42)
- Place of birth: Tucunduva, Brazil
- Height: 1.80 m (5 ft 11 in)
- Position: Centre back

Senior career*
Years	Team	Apps	(Gls)
2007–2008	Workable	18	(5)
2008–2009	Pegasus	19	(2)
2010	São Luiz	16	(0)
2010–2011	Fourway Rangers	24	(11)
2012–2013	Tuen Mun	27	(9)
2013–2014	Eastern	19	(2)
2014–2016	Rangers (HKG)	29	(1)
2016–2021	Southern	73	(9)

Managerial career
- 2021–2026: Southern (assistant coach)
- * Club domestic league appearances and goals as of 30 May 2021

Roberto Fronza (Chinese: 比圖; born 10 July 1984), also known as Beto, is a former Brazilian professional footballer who played as a centre back.

== Club career ==
=== Pegasus ===
Beto scored the first goal in Pegasus' 2008–09 Senior Shield Final win over Sun Hei. Pegasus went on to win 3–0 to claim their first ever trophy.

=== Tuen Mun ===
On 4 January 2012, Tuen Mun announced the signing of Beto on loan from Rangers. In August 2012, Beto signed a permanent contract with Tuen Mun SA.

=== Eastern ===
On 11 June 2013, Eastern announced that Beto has joined the club for free.

=== Southern ===
Beto joined Southern in 2016. His contract was renewed in July 2017.

On 7 June 2018, Beto signed a new contract with Southern for the following season.

On 1 June 2019, Southern announced that Beto's contract would be renewed for the 2019–20 season.

On 21 June 2021, Beto announced his retirement from professional football to become an assistant coach for the club.

== Honours ==
=== Club ===
Pegasus

- Hong Kong Senior Shield: 2008–09

Eastern

- Hong Kong FA Cup: 2013–14
