= Paul Ngue =

Hong Kong footballer

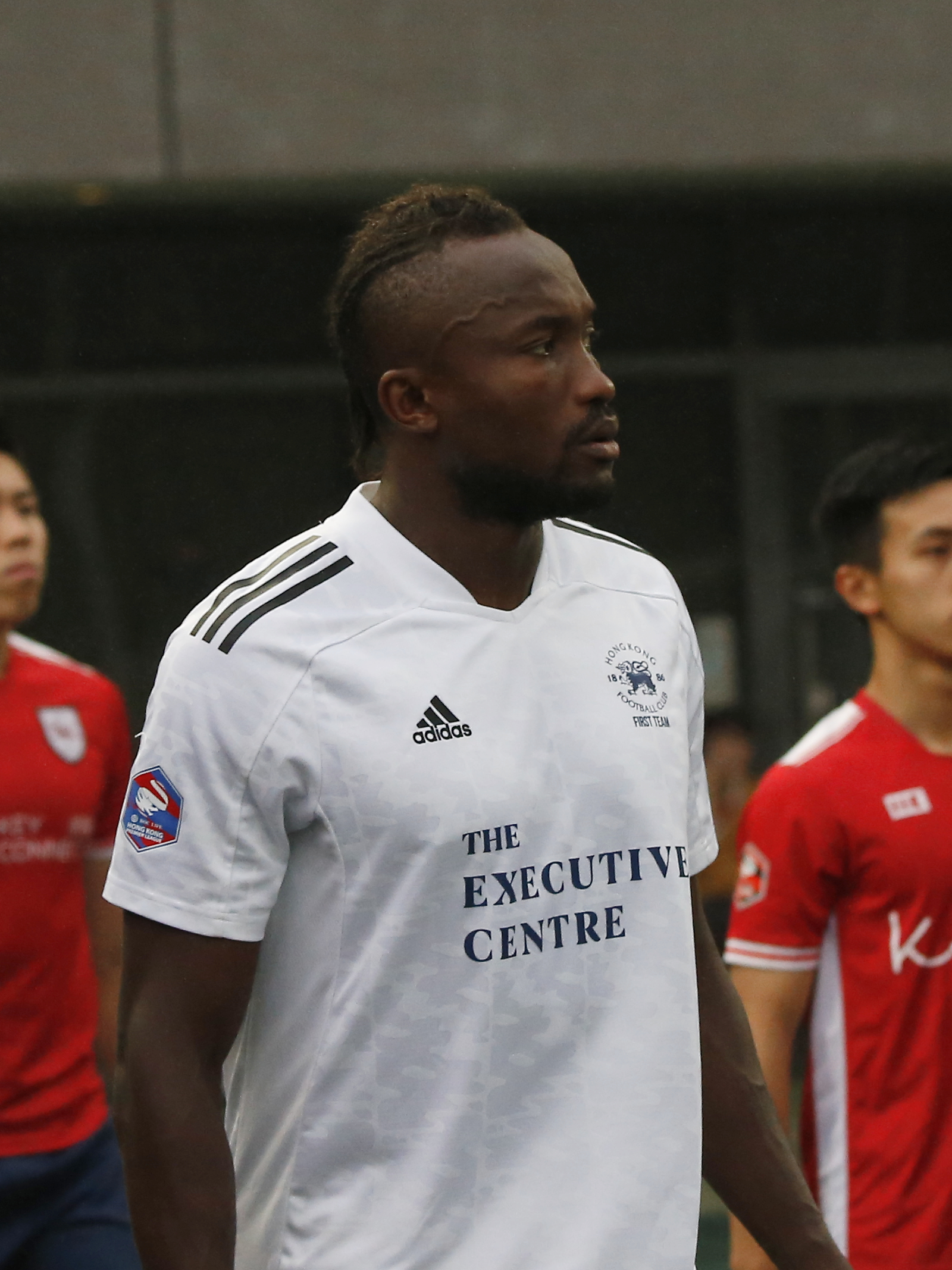

Personal information
- Full name: Paul Olivier Ngue Mayo
- Date of birth: 2 February 1988 (age 38)
- Place of birth: Yaoundé, Cameroon
- Height: 1.93 m (6 ft 4 in)
- Position: Forward

Senior career*
Years	Team	Apps	(Gls)
2008–2009	Kitchee	18	(12)
2009–2011	Tai Chung	25	(6)
2012–2013	Southern	19	(8)
2013–2014	Wong Tai Sin	12	(17)
2014–2015	Sun Source	26	(40)
2015	Dreams Metro Gallery	6	(0)
2016–2018	Southern	31	(5)
2018	Xinjiang Tianshan Leopard	13	(3)
2019	Pegasus	2	(0)
2021–2022	Hoi King	13	(4)
2022–2024	HKFC	16	(1)
2024	Sham Shui Po	7	(0)

International career^{‡}
2016–2018	Hong Kong	8	(0)

Managerial career
- 2024: Sham Shui Po (fitness coach)
- * Club domestic league appearances and goals as of 26 May 2024 ‡ National team caps and goals as of 13 November 2018

Paul Olivier Ngue Mayo (Chinese: 基奧; born 2 February 1988), nicknamed Oli or Oliver, is a former professional footballer who played as a forward. Born in Cameroon, he played for the Hong Kong national team.

== Club career ==
=== Southern ===
On 4 January 2016, Ngue joined Southern as a local player.

=== Xinjiang Tianshan Leopard ===
On 2 July 2018, Ngue joined China League One club Xinjiang Tianshan Leopard.

=== Pegasus ===
On 27 March 2019, Ngue joined Pegasus.

=== HKFC ===
In August 2022, Ngue returned to the top flight and joined HKFC.

On 27 August 2023, in rather dramatic fashion, Ngue was subbed on at the 80th minute during the 8-0 thrashing from Kitchee as a goalkeeper to replace injured Issey Maholo. He was praised for his efforts in goal as an emergency backup and managed to keep a shutout for himself despite the scoreline.

=== Sham Shui Po ===
On 3 March 2024, Ngue joined Sham Shui Po.

== International career ==
On 5 February 2016, Ngue managed to get a HKSAR passport by switching his nationality from Cameroon to Hong Kong after living in Hong Kong for 7 years.

On 3 June 2016, Ngue made his international debut for Hong Kong in the 2016 AYA Bank Cup match against Vietnam.

== Personal life ==
Ngue has 2 sons, Oskar, who is 12 years of age, and Yago, who is 3 years of age.

Oskar currently plays for Kitchee U14 YPL team as of today. Oskar currently has a sponsorship deal with Zyphr.

== Career statistics ==
=== International ===
As of 13 November 2018

National team	Year	Apps	Goals
Hong Kong	2016	2	0
Hong Kong	2017	2	0
Hong Kong	2018	4	0
Total		8	0
