= Carlos Cáceres =

Chilean footballer (born 1977)

Personal information
- Full name: Carlos Arturo Cáceres Pino
- Date of birth: 28 April 1977 (age 49)
- Place of birth: Santiago, Chile
- Height: 1.84 m (6 ft 0 in)
- Position: Forward

Senior career*
Years	Team	Apps	(Gls)
1994–1998	Provincial Osorno	19	(6)
1998–1999	Deportes Temuco		
1999–2001	Deportes Antofagasta		
2002	Santiago Morning	15	(5)
2002	Cobresal	17	(10)
2003	Chiapas	4	(1)
2003	Unión La Calera	21	(13)
2003	Unión Española	14	(3)
2004	Deportes Puerto Montt	12	(2)
2004	Provincial Osorno	15	(1)
2004	Deportes La Serena	17	(4)
2005	Rangers	6	(0)
2006	Ñublense	34	(17)
2007	Curicó Unido	32	(11)
2008	Perak FA	52	(41)
2009	Kitchee	11	(11)
2009–2010	Provincial Osorno	22	(7)
2011	Quesos Kümey		
2012	Luchador de Coñaripe		

Managerial career
- 2011–2014: Universidad Católica (Osorno)
- * Club domestic league appearances and goals

Carlos Arturo Cáceres Pino (born 28 April 1977) is a Chilean former professional footballer who played as a forward.

== Career ==
Cáceres was a prolific striker in the Chilean football, playing for 15 professional teams. Outside of Chile, he played for clubs in Mexico, Malaysia and Hong Kong. Due to his physical power, he was nicknamed Búfalo (Buffalo).

In 2001, he became the Primera B Top Goalscorer playing for Deportes Antofagasta by scoring 23 goals.

In 2011, he played for Quesos Kümey, an amateur club from a cheese (Queso in Spanish) manufacturing company based in Purranque, Chile, that competed in the 2011 Copa Chile. At the same time, he performed as coach for the Universidad Católica Academy in Osorno, Chile, alongside the former Paraguayan footballer Rolando Azas.

== Honours ==
- Primera B de Chile Top Goalscorer: 2001
