= Paulo Henrique (footballer, born 1972) =

Brazilian footballer

Personal information
- Full name: Paulo Henrique Miranda
- Date of birth: 21 February 1972 (age 54)
- Place of birth: Brazil
- Height: 1.72 m (5 ft 8 in)
- Position: Midfielder

Senior career*
Years	Team	Apps	(Gls)
- Internacional
- Grêmio
- Portuguesa Desportos
1999	JEF United Ichihara		
1999	Vegalta Sendai		
- Defensor Sporting
2009–	Eastern		
- Fourway Athletics
- * Club domestic league appearances and goals

Paulo Henrique (born 21 February 1972) is a Brazilian former professional footballer who played as a midfielder.

== Career statistics ==
Appearances and goals by club, season and competition
Club	Season	League			National cup (Note: Includes Emperor's Cup, Hong Kong FA Cup.)		League cup (Note: Includes J.League Cup, Hong Kong League Cup.)		Total	
Club	Season	Division	Apps	Goals	Apps	Goals	Apps	Goals	Apps	Goals
JEF United Ichihara	1999	J1 League	15	1	0	0	2	1	17	2
Vegalta Sendai	1999	J2 League	16	4	2	2	0	0	18	6
Fourway Athletics	2008–09	Hong Kong First Division League	5	2	1	1	–		6	3
Fourway Athletics	2009–10	Hong Kong First Division League								
Fourway Athletics	Total		5	2	1	1	0	0	6	3
Career total			36	7	3	3	2	1	41	11
