= Chao Pengfei =

Hong Kong footballer

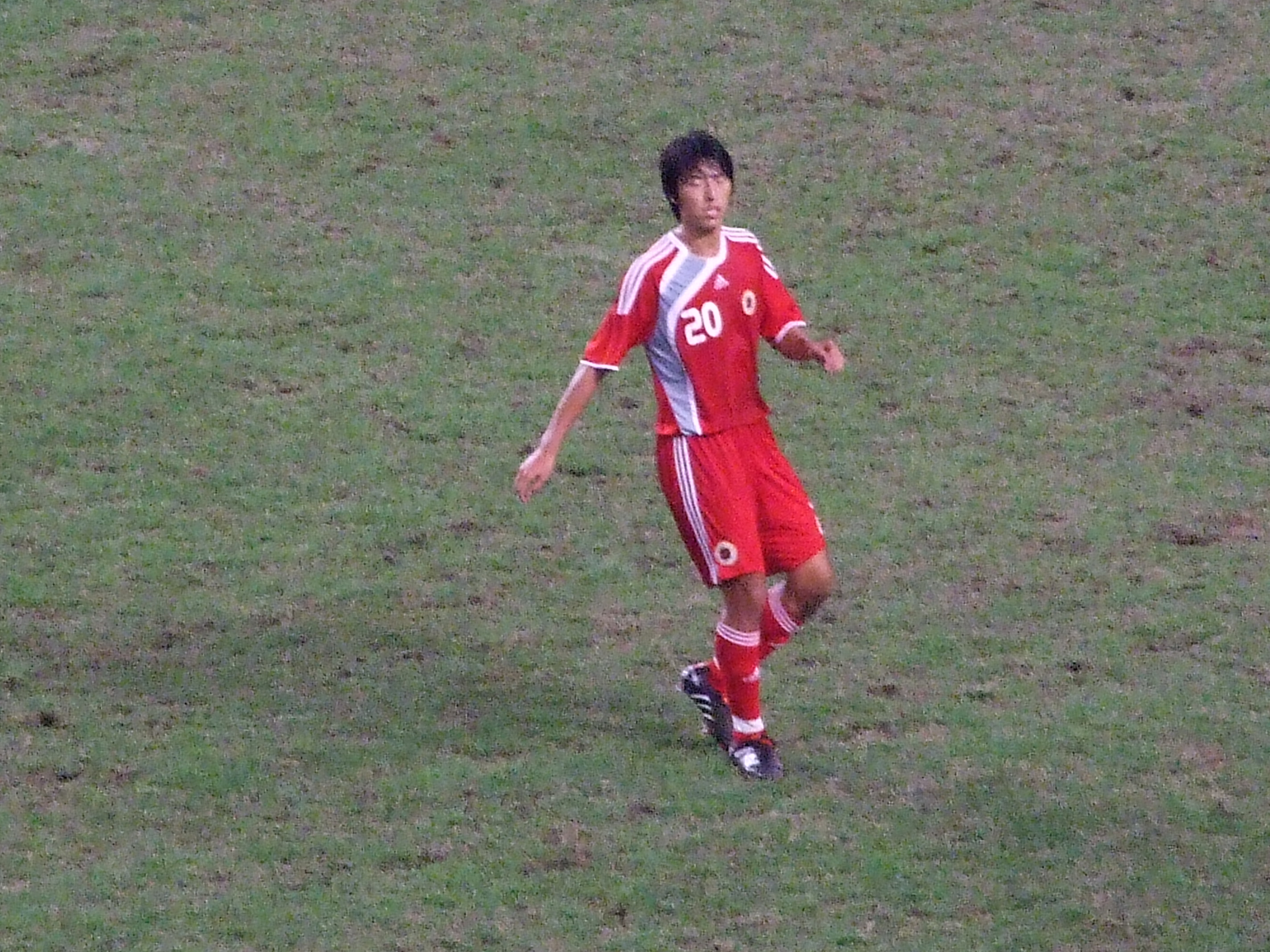

Personal information
- Full name: Chao Pengfei
- Date of birth: 11 July 1987 (age 39)
- Place of birth: Dalian, Liaoning, China
- Height: 1.87 m (6 ft 1 1/2 in)
- Position: Forward

Youth career
- 2004–2005: Dalian Shide

Senior career*
Years	Team	Apps	(Gls)
2005–2007	Citizen	37	(10)
2007–2009	Happy Valley	46	(14)
2009–2010	South China	9	(4)
2010–2011	Sun Hei	14	(2)
2011–2012	Hong Kong Rangers	7	(1)
2012	→ Kitchee (loan)	4	(0)
2012–2013	Tuen Mun	17	(2)
2013	Happy Valley	6	(0)
2014	Hong Kong Rangers	4	(1)
2014–2015	Yau Tsim Mong	26	(11)
2015–2017	Wanchai	32	(7)

International career^{‡}
2004–2005	China U19		
2009–2010	Hong Kong U23	8	(0)
2009–2011	Hong Kong	15	(3)
Medal record
Representing Hong Kong
East Asian Games
Gold medal – first place	2009 Hong Kong	Football
- * Club domestic league appearances and goals as of 20 August 2019 ‡ National team caps and goals as of 3 June 2011

Chao Pengfei
- Traditional Chinese: 巢鵬飛
- Simplified Chinese: 巢鹏飞
- Hanyu Pinyin: Cháo Péngfēi
- Cantonese Yale: Chàau Pàangfēi
Transcriptions
Standard Mandarin
- Hanyu Pinyin: Cháo Péngfēi
Yue: Cantonese
- Yale Romanization: Chàau Pàangfēi

Chao Pengfei (Chinese: 巢鵬飛; born 11 July 1987) is a former professional footballer who played as a forward. Born in China, he represented Hong Kong internationally.

== Club career ==
=== South China ===
On 25 May 2010, Chao scored a hat-trick against Happy Valley in the season-closing match. It turned out this was his last outing for South China.

=== Sun Hei ===
Chao joined Sun Hei in 2010 summer after spending one season in South China.

Chao scored for Sun Hei on his debut against Tai Chung on 7 September 2010. He received his first red card in Sun Hei against Citizen on 17 October 2010, which caused the team to lose 4–5. He scored his second league goals against Hong Kong Football Club on 1 May 2011, which helped the team to win over 3–1.

=== Rangers ===
Chao moved to Rangers in the summer of 2011.

He made his debut for Rangers against Pegasus as a starting XI on 9 September 2011, but he could not help the team to win the match. He scored his first goal for Rangers in a 4–1 victory against Tai Po on 24 September 2011. He made a total of 7 league appearances and scored 1 goal.

=== Kitchee ===
In January 2012, Chao was loaned to Kitchee to strengthen the club's attack as it prepares for the 2012 AFC Cup.

He made his league debut for Kitchee against his old club Rangers as a half-time substitute for Huang Yang on 8 January 2012. He did not score any goal in the match, but he helped the team to win over the opponent 6–2. He made four league appearances for Kitchee. He also made 1 League Cup and 3 FA Cup appearances for Kitchee. Although he played eight matches for Kitchee, he did not score any goals.

Chao helped the team to win the First Division League, the League Cup and the FA Cup.

=== Tuen Mun ===
Chao joined Tuen Mun in the 2012–13 season. When Chao played for the club, it offered him a monthly salary of HKD$ 80,800.

== International career ==
On 14 January 2009, Chao made his international debut for Hong Kong in a friendly match against India.

On 27 August 2009, Chao scored a hat-trick and fellow striker Chan Siu Ki scored 4 goals to help Hong Kong defeat Guam and qualify for the finals of the 2010 East Asian Football Championship.

Chao was a member of the squad that won the men's football gold medal in the 2009 East Asian Games.

Chao also played in the 2010 East Asian Football Championship and 2010 Asian Games but he was not able to score any goals.

On 28 September 2010, Chao scored a goal for HK U-23 against Australia U-20 in a friendly. The match ended 2–2.

== International goals ==
No.	Date	Venue	Opponent	Score	Result	Competition
1.	27 August 2009	Kaohsiung, Taiwan	Guam	5–0	12–0	2010 East Asian Football Championship
2.	27 August 2009	Kaohsiung, Taiwan	Guam	7–0	12–0	2010 East Asian Football Championship
3.	27 August 2009	Kaohsiung, Taiwan	Guam	12–0	12–0	2010 East Asian Football Championship

== Honour ==
=== Club ===
Kitchee

- Hong Kong First Division League (1): 2011–12
- Hong Kong FA Cup (1): 2011–12
- Hong Kong League Cup (1): 2011–12

South China

- Hong Kong First Division League (1): 2009–10
- Hong Kong Senior Challenge Shield (1): 2009–10

=== International ===
Hong Kong

- 2009 East Asian Games Football Event: Gold

== Career statistics ==
=== Club ===
Updated 18 June 2012

Club	Season	League		Senior Shield		League Cup		FA Cup		AFC Cup		Total	
Club	Season	Apps	Goals	Apps	Goals	Apps	Goals	Apps	Goals	Apps	Goals	Apps	Goals
Citizen	2005–06	10	2	0	0	4	3	2	0	—	—	16	5
Citizen	2006–07	15	3	1	0	4	2	1	0	—	—	21	5
Citizen Total		25	5	1	0	8	5	3	0	0	0	37	10
Happy Valley	2007–08	18	5	3	0	3	0	1	0	—	—	25	5
Happy Valley	2008–09	21	9	0	0	1	1	2	1	—	—	24	11
Happy Valley Total		39	14	3	0	4	1	3	1	0	0	49	17
South China	2009–10	9	4	0	0	—	—	0	0	4	0	13	4
South China Total		9	4	0	0	0	0	0	0	4	0	13	4
Sun Hei	2010–11	14	2	1	0	1	0	2	0	—	—	18	2
Sun Hei Total		14	2	1	0	1	0	2	0	0	0	18	2
Rangers	2011–12	7	1	1	0	0	0	0	0	—	—	8	1
Biu Chun Rangers Total		14	10	1	0	0	0	0	0	0	0	8	1
Kitchee	2011–12	4	0	0	0	1	0	3	0	4	0	12	0
Kitchee Total		4	0	0	0	1	0	3	0	4	0	12	0
Tuen Mun	2012–13	20	15	0	0	0	0	0	0	—	—	0	0
Tuen Mun Total		20	15	0	0	0	0	0	0	0	0	0	0
Career Total		118	56	6	0	14	6	11	1	8	0	137	33

=== International ===
==== Hong Kong ====
Updated 3 June 2011

#	Date	Venue	Opponent	Result	Scored	Competition
1	14 January 2009	Hong Kong Stadium, Hong Kong	India	2–1	0	Friendly
2	21 January 2009	Hong Kong Stadium, Hong Kong	Bahrain	1–3	0	2011 AFC Asian Cup qualification
3	28 January 2009	Ali Muhesen Stadium, Sana'a, Yemen	Yemen	0–1	0	2011 AFC Asian Cup qualification
4	23 August 2009	World Games Stadium, Kaohsiung, Taiwan	Chinese Taipei	4–0	0	2010 East Asian Football Championship Semi-final
5	25 August 2009	World Games Stadium, Kaohsiung, Taiwan	North Korea	0–0	0	2010 East Asian Football Championship Semi-final
6	27 August 2009	World Games Stadium, Kaohsiung, Taiwan	Guam	12–0	3	2010 East Asian Football Championship Semi-final
7	9 October 2009	Outsourcing Stadium, Shizuoka, Japan	Japan	0–6	0	2011 AFC Asian Cup qualification
8	7 February 2010	Olympic Stadium, Tokyo, Japan	South Korea	0–5	0	2010 East Asian Football Championship
9	11 February 2010	Olympic Stadium, Tokyo, Japan	Japan	0–3	0	2010 East Asian Football Championship
10	14 February 2010	Olympic Stadium, Tokyo, Japan	China	0–2	0	2010 East Asian Football Championship
11	3 March 2010	Hong Kong Stadium, Hong Kong	Yemen	0–0	0	2011 AFC Asian Cup qualification
12	9 October 2010	Kaohsiung National Stadium, Kaohsiung	Philippines	4–2	0	2010 Long Teng Cup
13	10 October 2010	Kaohsiung National Stadium, Kaohsiung	Macau	4–0	0	2010 Long Teng Cup
14	12 October 2010	Kaohsiung National Stadium, Kaohsiung	Chinese Taipei	1–1	0	2010 Long Teng Cup
15	3 June 2011	Siu Sai Wan Sports Ground, Hong Kong	Malaysia	1–1	0	Friendly

==== Hong Kong U-23 ====
Updated 11 November 2010.

#	Date	Venue	Opponent	Result	Scored	Competition
1	4 December 2009	Siu Sai Wan Sports Ground, Hong Kong	South Korea	4–1	0	2009 East Asian Games
2	8 December 2009	Siu Sai Wan Sports Ground, Hong Kong	China	0–1	0	2009 East Asian Games
3	10 December 2009	Hong Kong Stadium, Hong Kong	North Korea	1–1 (4–2 PSO)	0	2009 East Asian Games
4	12 December 2009	Hong Kong Stadium, Hong Kong	Japan	1–1 (4–2 PSO)	0	2009 East Asian Games
	28 September 2010	Sai Tso Wan Recreation Ground, Hong Kong	Australia	2–2	1	Friendly
	2 November 2010	Siu Sai Wan Sports Ground, Hong Kong	South China	0–4	0	Friendly
5	7 November 2010	Huadu Stadium, Guangzhou, China	United Arab Emirates	1–1	0	2010 Asian Games
6	9 November 2010	Huadu Stadium, Guangzhou, China	Uzbekistan	1–0	0	2010 Asian Games
7	11 November 2010	Huadu Stadium, Guangzhou, China	Bangladesh	4–1	0	2010 Asian Games
8	15 November 2010	Huangpu Sports Center, Guangzhou, China	Oman	0–3	0	2010 Asian Games
