= Edson Minga =

Congolese-Hong Kong footballer (born 1982)

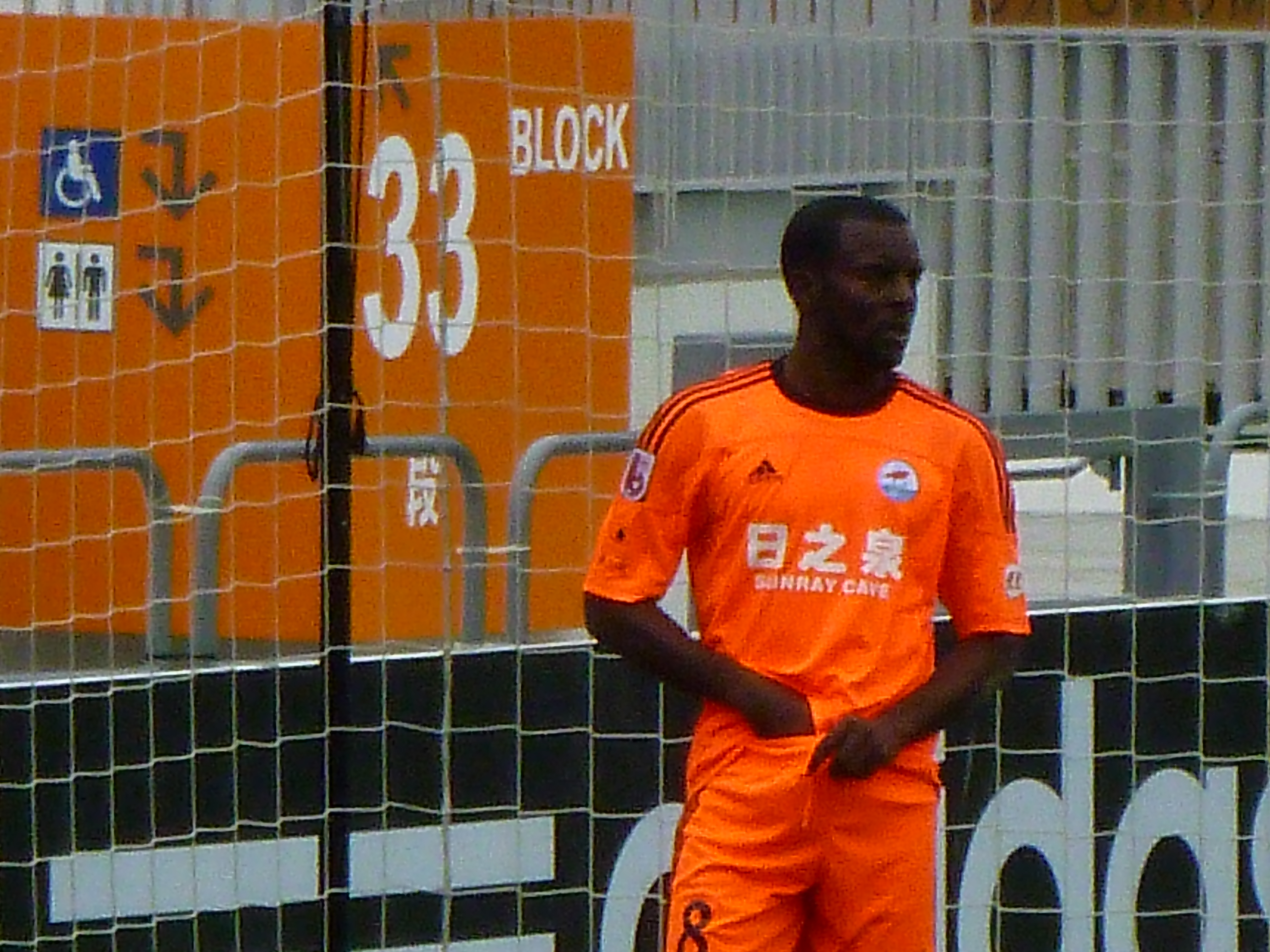

Personal information
- Full name: Edson Dico Minga
- Date of birth: 31 March 1982 (age 44)
- Place of birth: Brazzaville, Republic of the Congo
- Height: 1.80 m (5 ft 11 in)
- Position: Forward

Senior career*
Years	Team	Apps	(Gls)
1998–2000	FC 105 Libreville	38	(15)
2001–2003	AmaZulu	15	(4)
2003–2007	Manning Rangers	32	(7)
2007	Mahindra United	12	(2)
2007–2008	Hong Kong Rangers	12	(2)
2008–2009	Fourway	20	(7)
2009–2010	Kitchee	13	(3)
2010–2011	Fourway Rangers	16	(6)
2012–2017	Sun Hei	214	(9)
2018	Hong Kong Rangers	3	(1)

International career^{‡}
1999–2008	Congo	10	(1)
- * Club domestic league appearances and goals as of 04:51, 16 July 2010 (UTC) ‡ National team caps and goals as of 04:51, 14 October 2018 (UTC)

Edson Dico Minga (Chinese: 文嘉; born 31 May 1979) is a retired Congolese professional footballer who played as a striker.

== Club career ==
In 2007, Minga joined Indian I-League club Mahindra United.
