= Caleb Ekwegwo =

Nigerian footballer

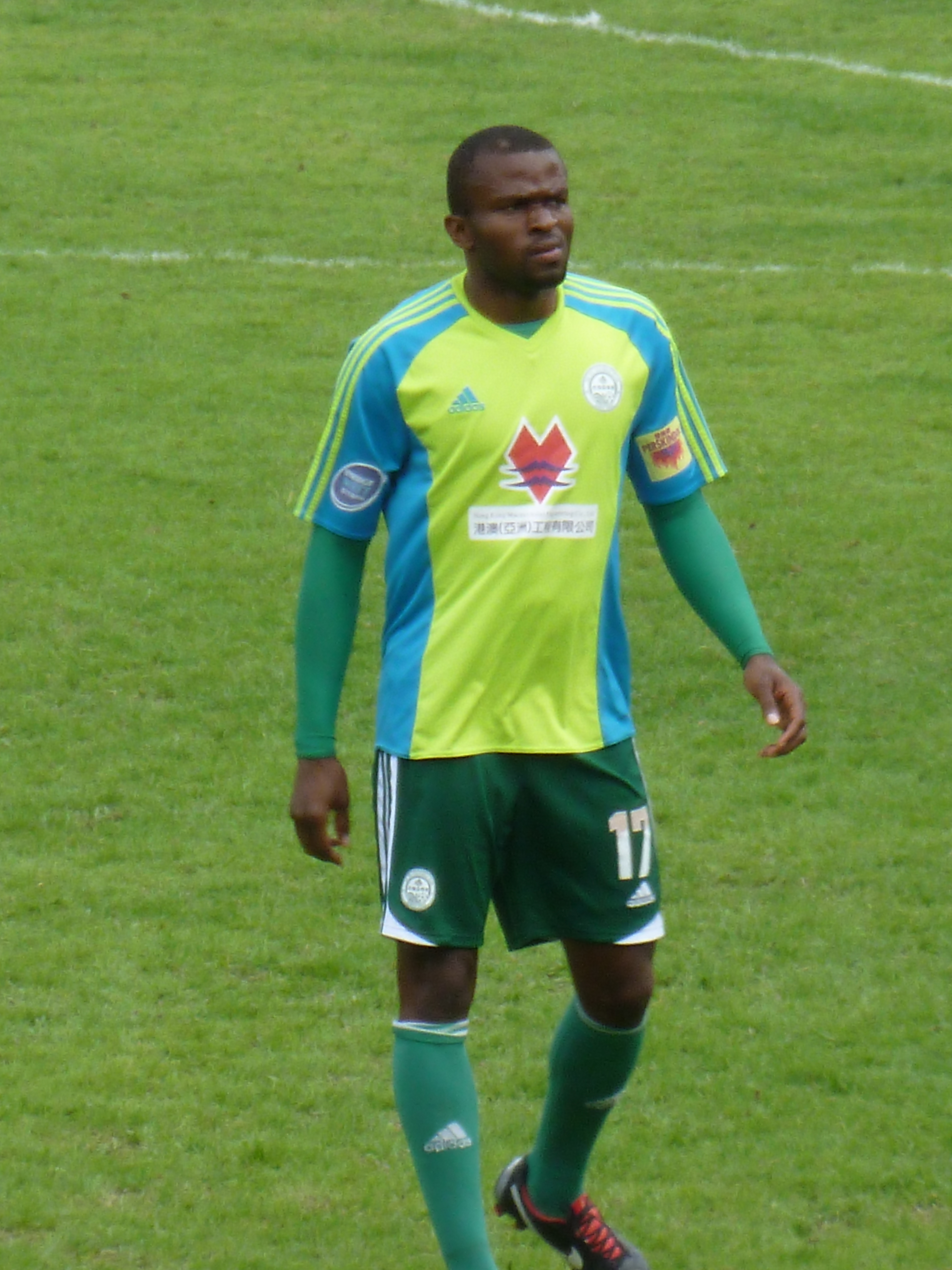

Personal information
- Full name: Caleb Tochukwu Maranatha Ekwegwo
- Date of birth: 1 August 1988 (age 38)
- Place of birth: Onitsha, Nigeria
- Height: 1.86 m (6 ft 1 in)
- Position: Striker

Senior career*
Years	Team	Apps	(Gls)
2006–2007	Enugu City	18	(10)
2007	Sun Hei	2	(0)
2007–2008	Hong Kong Rangers	7	(1)
2008	Fourway	11	(4)
2009	Tai Po	12	(5)
2009–2010	Hapoel Nazareth Illit	10	(5)
2010	Hapoel Ironi Kiryat Shmona	9	(0)
2011	FK Banga Gargždai	2	(0)
2013–2016	Tai Po	40	(26)
2016–2018	Wong Tai Sin	37	(53)
2018–2019	Yuen Long	11	(4)
2019–2020	King Fung	12	(9)
2021–2024	King Mountain	48	(39)
2024	Fu Moon	2	(2)
2024–2025	WSE	10	(5)
2025–	Fu Moon	7	(9)
- * Club domestic league appearances and goals as of 31 May 2026

Caleb Tochukwu Maranatha Ekwegwo (Chinese: 王卡立; born 1 August 1988) is a Nigerian former professional footballer who played as a striker.

== Club career ==
In December 2018, after residing in Hong Kong for more than 7 years, Ekwegwo was granted the HKSAR passport, making him eligible to be registered as a local player in Hong Kong.
