= Tuen Mun Progoal FC =

Tuen Mun Progoal
- Full name: Tuen Mun Progoal Football Club
- Founded: 2008
- Dissolved: 2009
- Advisor: (Hong Kong) Yam Wai Hung
- League: Hong Kong First Division
- 2009–10: Disqualified

Tuen Mun Progoal Football Club (Chinese: 屯門普高足球會) was a Hong Kong football club which played in the Hong Kong First Division League in the 2008–09 and 2009–10 season. It borrowed the entities of Shek Kip Mei to compete in the league.

== Match-fixing controversy ==
The Hong Kong Football Association said that it will seek help from the Independent Commission Against Corruption over claims that the match between Happy Valley and Tuen Mun Progoal on 30 March 2009, in which Progoal conceded four goals in the last seven minutes and lost 1–5, was fixed.

== Expulsion from Hong Kong First Division League ==
The Hong Kong Football Association announced on 27 November 2009 that the club was expulsed from the league competition with immediate effect due to default in payments to players insurance to the HKFA. As a result, the club's remaining schedules in the 2009–10 season (sans disciplinary record and which remains intact) have been declared vacant and the players are eligible for free transfers.
