= Xiangxue Eisiti (Hong Kong) =

Chinese football club

- Founded: 2008
- Dissolved: 2009
- Ground: Hong Kong (no fixed location)
- Parent club: Shenzhen Xiangxue Eisiti F.C.
- League: Hong Kong First Division League
- 2008–09: First Division, 13th (relegated)

Xiangxue Eisiti
- Traditional Chinese: 香雪上清飲
- Simplified Chinese: 香雪上清饮
- Hanyu Pinyin: Xiāng xuě shàng qīng yǐn
- Jyutping: hoeng1 syut3 soeng5 cing1 jam2
Transcriptions
Standard Mandarin
- Hanyu Pinyin: Xiāng xuě shàng qīng yǐn
Yue: Cantonese
- Jyutping: hoeng1 syut3 soeng5 cing1 jam2

Shenzhen F.C. II, known as Xiangxue Eisiti for sponsorship reason, was a Chinese football team which played in Hong Kong First Division League in 2008–09 season. It was the reserve team of Shenzhen F.C., known as Shenzhen Xiangxue Eisiti (Shenzhen Xiangxue Shangqingyin) for sponsorship reasons at that time.

== Home ground ==
Xiangxue Eisiti wanted to host its games at the sports ground of Shenzhen Bogang F.C. in Shajing, Bao'an District, but after inspection by the HKFA, the ground was considered unsuitable to host any league games. Instead, Xiangxue Eisiti had to play all their home games at Mong Kok Stadium or Siu Sai Wan Sports Ground.

== See also ==
- Shenzhen F.C.
- Xiangxue Pharmaceutical (football)
