= 2009–10 Hong Kong FA Cup =

Tournament details
- Country: Hong Kong
- Teams: 10

Final positions
- Champions: TSW Pegasus (1st title)
- Runners-up: Citizen

Tournament statistics
- Matches played: 9
- Goals scored: 29 (3.22 per match)
- Attendance: 12,665 (1,407 per match)
- Top goal scorer(s): (Brazil) Itaparica (TSW Pegasus) (Brazil) Paulinho (Citizen) (4 goals each)

The 2009–10 Hong Kong FA Cup was the 36th season of the Hong Kong FA Cup and was played as a knockout competition for all the teams of the Hong Kong First Division League in the 2009–10 season. The first-round matches were played on 7 March 2010, and the final was competed on 29 May 2010.

TSW Pegasus won its first FA Cup title and qualified for the 2011 AFC Cup as South China won both the 2009–10 Hong Kong First Division League and the 2009–10 Hong Kong Senior Challenge Shield.

== Calendar ==
Round	Date	Matches	Clubs
First Round	7 March 2010	2	10 → 8
Quarter-finals	3 April 2010 – 4 April 2010	4	8 → 4
Semi-finals	16 May 2010	2	4 → 2
Final	30 May 2010	1	2 → 1

== Teams ==
Team	Last year Performance	Title
Citizen	Quarter-finalists	1
Fourway Rangers	Semi-finalists	0
Happy Valley	Quarter-finalists	2
Kitchee	Quarter-finalists	5
Shatin	First round	0
South China	Semi-finalist	9
Sun Hei	First round	3
Tai Chung	No Appearance	0
NT Realty Wofoo Tai Po	Winners	1
TSW Pegasus	Runners-up	0

== Bracket ==
Quarter-finals
4 April - Siu Sai Wan
TSW Pegasus	6
Happy Valley	1
3 April - Yuen Long
NT Realty Wofoo Tai Po	2
Shatin	1
4 April - Siu Sai Wan
Fourway Rangers	1 (4)
Sun Hei	1 (3)
3 April - Yuen Long
South China	0 (3)
Citizen	0 (4)

Semi-finals
16 May - Hong Kong
TSW Pegasus	3
NT Realty Wofoo Tai Po	1
16 May - Hong Kong
Fourway Rangers	1
Citizen	2

Final
30 May - Hong Kong
TSW Pegasus	2
Citizen	1

== First round ==
7 March 2010
17:00

Citizen	3 – 0	Tai Chung
Paulinho 21', 64' (pen.); Detinho 48'	Report

Tsing Yi Sports Ground
Attendance: 333
Referee: Liu Kwok Man

7 March 2010
19:00

Shatin	2 – 2 (a.e.t.)	Kitchee
Chu Siu Kei 16'; Sham Kwok Keung 45+'	Report	Minga 10'; Lam Ka Wai 18'
Penalties
Chu Siu Kei (penalty scored); Machia (penalty scored); Fabio (penalty missed); Mirko (penalty missed); Lai Kai Cheuk (penalty scored)	3 – 2	(penalty scored) Luzardo; (penalty scored) Nsue; (penalty missed) Lo Kwan Yee; (penalty missed) Gao Wen; (penalty missed) Cheng Lai Hin

Tsing Yi Sports Ground
Attendance: 333
Referee: Charlton Wong Chi Tang

== Quarter-finals ==
3 April 2010
14:00

NT Realty Wofoo Tai Po	2 – 1	Shatin
To Hon To 62'; So Loi Keung 90+'	Report	Sham Kwok Keung 9'

Yuen Long Stadium
Attendance: 1,557
Referee: Liu Kwok Man

3 April 2010
16:30

South China	0 – 0 (a.e.t.)	Citizen
	Report
Penalties
Chan Siu Ki (penalty scored); Leo (penalty missed); Chan Wai Ho (penalty scored); Poon Yiu Cheuk (penalty scored); Sidrailson (penalty missed)	3 – 4	(penalty scored) Paulinho; (penalty scored) Sandro; (penalty scored) Sham Kwok Fai; (penalty scored) Law Chun Bong

Yuen Long Stadium
Attendance: 1,557
Referee: Tong Kui Sum

4 April 2010
14:00

Fourway Rangers	1 – 1 (a.e.t.)	Sun Hei
Ondoua 86'	Report	Fujii 68' (pen.)
Penalties
Paulo (penalty scored); Ondoua (penalty scored); Ntombela (penalty scored); Iu Wai (penalty scored); Fan Weijun (penalty missed)	4 – 3	(penalty scored) Fujii; (penalty scored) Cahe; (penalty missed) Lo Chi Kwan; (penalty scored) Bamnjo; (penalty missed) Roberto

Siu Sai Wan Sports Ground
Attendance: 475
Referee: Ng Chiu Kok

4 April 2010
17:00

TSW Pegasus	6 – 1	Happy Valley
Lau Nim Yat 4'; Li Zhixing 6'; Mario 32', 40'; Li Ling Fung 84', 88'	Report	Anane 1'

Siu Sai Wan Sports Ground
Attendance: 475
Referee: Charlton Wong Chi Tang

== Semi-finals ==
16 May 2010
14:00

Fourway Rangers	1 – 2	Citizen
Fan Weijun 15'	Report	Detinho 45'; Paulinho 88'

Hong Kong Stadium
Attendance: 2,410
Referee: Pau Sai Yin

16 May 2010
16:00

TSW Pegasus	3 – 1	NT Realty Wofoo Tai Po
Itaparica 30', 66' (pen.), 78' (pen.)	Report	So Loi Keung 89' (pen.)

Hong Kong Stadium
Attendance: 2,410
Referee: Charlton Wong Chi Tang

== Final ==
30 May 2010
15:45

TSW Pegasus	2 – 1	Citizen
Lee Hong Lim 64'; Itaparica 71'	Report	Paulinho 76'

Hong Kong Stadium
Attendance: 3,115
Referee: Liu Kwok Man

TSW Pegasus	Citizen

TSW PEGASUS:
GK	1	(Hong Kong) Yapp Hung Fai
RB	3	(Hong Kong) Lau Nim Yat		(substituted off) 78'
CB	6	(Hong Kong) Luk Koon Pong	(yellow card) 22'
CB	5	(Ghana) Wisdom Fofo Agbo (c)
LB	4	(Hong Kong) Deng Jinghuang	(yellow card) 62'
RM	11	(Brazil) Itaparica
CM	10	(Cameroon) Eugene Mbome
CM	15	(Hong Kong) Yuen Kin Man		(substituted off) 74'
LM	13	(Hong Kong) Cheung Kin Fung
SS	17	(Hong Kong) Lee Hong Lim
CF	32	(Brazil) Mario Nascimento
Substitutes:
GK	23	(Hong Kong) Li Jian
DF	2	(Brazil) Marcio Martins		(substituted on) 74'
DF	21	(Hong Kong) Lai Man Fei
MF	19	(Hong Kong) Lam Hin Shing
FW	9	(Hong Kong) Leung Tsz Chun		(substituted on) 78'
FW	16	(Hong Kong) Li Ling Fung
FW	18	(China) Li Zhixing
Manager:
(Brazil) José Ricardo Rambo

CITIZEN:
GK	29	(Hong Kong) Tse Tak Him
RB	2	(Hong Kong) Sham Kwok Fai
CB	7	(Nigeria) Festus Baise (c)	(yellow card) 77' (yellow-red card) 87'
CB	23	(Brazil) Hélio	(yellow card) 32'
LB	12	(Hong Kong) Ma Ka Ki		(substituted off) 85'
DM	15	(Ghana) Moses Mensah		(substituted off) 67'
RM	8	(Hong Kong) Xu Deshuai
LM	11	(Hong Kong) Law Chun Bong	(yellow card) 70'
AM	24	(China) Ju Yingzhi
SS	30	(Brazil) Detinho	(yellow card) 33'
CF	19	(Brazil) Paulinho Piracicaba
Substitutes:
GK	1	(Hong Kong) Liu Fu Yuen
DF	3	(Hong Kong) Wong Yiu Fu
DF	5	(Hong Kong) Chan Man Chun
DF	13	(Hong Kong) Fung Kai Hong
MF	6	(Brazil) Fagner
MF	37	(Hong Kong) Yeung Chi Lun		(substituted on) 85'
FW	9	(Brazil) Sandro		(substituted on) 67'
Manager:
(Brazil) Jorginho

MATCH OFFICIALS
Assistant referees:
Ng Chiu Kok
Chow Chun Kit
Fourth official:
Lam Chi Ho

MATCH RULES

- 90 minutes.
- 30 minutes of extra-time if necessary.
- Penalty shoot-out if scores still level.
- Seven named substitutes
- Maximum of 3 substitutions.

== Scorers ==
The scorers in the 2009–10 Hong Kong FA Cup are as follows:

4 goals

- (Brazil) Itaparica (TSW Pegasus)
- (Brazil) Paulinho Piracicaba (Citizen)

2 goals

- (Brazil) Detinho (Citizen)
- (Hong Kong) Sham Kwok Keung (Shatin)
- (Hong Kong) So Loi Keung (NT Realty Wofoo Tai Po)
- (Brazil) Mario Nascimento (TSW Pegasus)
- (Hong Kong) Li Ling Fung (TSW Pegasus)

1 goal

- (China) Fan Weijun (Fourway Rangers)

1 goal

- (Cameroon) Guy Junior Ondoua (Fourway Rangers)
- (Ghana) Yaw Anane (Happy Valley)
- (Hong Kong) To Hon To (NT Realty Wofoo Tai Po)
- (Republic of the Congo) Edson Minga (Kitchee)
- (Hong Kong) Lam Ka Wai (Kitchee)
- (Hong Kong) Chu Siu Kei (Shatin)
- (Japan) Takashi Fujii (Sun Hei)
- (Hong Kong) Lau Nim Yat (TSW Pegasus)
- (Hong Kong) Lee Hong Lim (TSW Pegasus)
- (China) Li Zhixing (TSW Pegasus)
