= 2009–10 Hong Kong First Division League =

Hong Kong First Division League
- Season: 2009–10
- Champions: South China; 40th Hong Kong title
- Relegated: Shatin; Happy Valley
- AFC Cup: South China; TSW Pegasus
- Matches: 90
- Goals: 277 (3.08 per match)
- Top goalscorer: Cahê (14 goals)
- Biggest home win: Citizen 7 – 0 Happy Valley (25 October 2009)
- Biggest away win: Happy Valley 0 – 4 Kitchee (11 September 2009)
- Highest scoring: Happy Valley 2 – 6 South China (24 January 2010) (8 goals)
- Longest winning run: South China, TSW Pegasus, Kitchee, Citizen (3 games)
- Longest unbeaten run: South China (13 games)
- Longest losing run: Shatin (4 games)
- Highest attendance: Kitchee 2 – 1 South China (5,442) (31 October 2009)
- Lowest attendance: Kitchee 3 – 1 Shatin (122) (11 March 2010)
- Average attendance: 710

The 2009–10 Hong Kong Football Association First Division League (known as HKFA bma First Division League for sponsorship reasons) was the 98th top tier football league of Hong Kong. Because of the renovation of Mong Kok Stadium which will last for two league seasons, the current First Division League has allocated eight stadia for the eleven participating teams to play their home games.

The inaugural match was held between South China and Tai Chung on 6 September 2009. It was the first time since 1987–88 season that the inaugural match was not played between the former season champion and runner-up.

Hong Kong Football Association disqualified Tuen Mun Progoal on 27 November 2009 due to Tuen Mun Progoal defaulting on labour insurance.

The title was won by South China, their fourth consecutive title. Happy Valley and Shatin were relegated at the end of the season. This is the first ever relegation for Happy Valley and came in their 60th anniversary season. The players from Happy Valley and Fourway Rangers were involved in a match-fixing scandal.

== League table ==
Pos	Team	Pld	W	D	L	GF	GA	GD	Pts	Qualification or relegation
1	South China (C)	18	13	3	2	51	21	+30	42	2011 AFC Cup group stage
2	TSW Pegasus	18	10	5	3	33	21	+12	35	2011 AFC Cup group stage (Note: via 2009–10 Hong Kong FA Cup)
3	Kitchee	18	8	7	3	34	18	+16	31	
4	Citizen	18	6	8	4	29	16	+13	26	
5	Sun Hei	18	7	3	8	38	27	+11	24	
6	NT Realty Wofoo Tai Po	18	6	5	7	25	27	−2	23	
7	Fourway	18	4	7	7	19	28	−9	19	
8	Tai Chung	18	4	6	8	14	27	−13	18	
9	Shatin (R)	18	2	7	9	18	35	−17	13	Relegation to Second Division
10	Happy Valley (R)	18	2	5	11	17	58	−41	11	Relegation to Second Division
–	Tuen Mun Progoal (D)	0	0	0	0	0	0	0	0	Disqualified (Note: All Tuen Mun Progoal matches were cancelled.)

Updated to match(es) played on 25 May 2010. Source: The Hong Kong Football Association
Rules for classification: 1) points; 2) head-to-head points; 3) head-to-head goal difference; 4) head-to-head goals scored; 5) goal difference; 6) number of goals scored.
(C) Champions; (D) Disqualified; (R) Relegated

== Results ==
Home \ Away	CIT	RAN	HVA	KIT	WTP	SHA	SCA	SUN	TAI	TSW
Citizen		1–1	7–0	0–1	0–1	3–1	1–1	1–1	1–0	4–1
Fourway	0–0		2–0	1–1	1–1	1–0	2–5	2–1	1–1	1–4
Happy Valley	0–0	1–0		0–4	1–2	2–2	2–6	2–2	1–1	1–4
Kitchee	2–2	3–3	6–0		1–2	3–1	2–1	3–2	2–0	0–0
NT Realty Wofoo Tai Po	2–2	1–0	4–0	2–2		0–0	1–3	2–4	0–1	1–2
Shatin	2–0	1–1	1–3	0–2	4–1		2–2	1–1	1–3	1–1
South China	1–0	1–0	6–1	2–1	1–0	6–0		3–2	4–0	3–2
Sun Hei	0–3	4–1	6–0	1–0	2–3	4–0	3–1		3–0	2–3
Tai Chung	1–3	0–2	1–1	1–1	1–1	1–1	1–1	1–0		1–0
TSW Pegasus	1–1	3–0	4–2	0–0	2–1	1–0	2–2	1–0	2–1	

Source: HKFA 1st Division Football League 2009–-2010
Legend: Blue = home team win; Yellow = draw; Red = away team win.
- All times are Hong Kong Time (UTC+8).

=== Round 1 ===
6 September 2009
15:00

South China	4–0	Tai Chung
Kwok Kin Pong 18', 76'; Carrijo 43', 73'	Report

Hong Kong Stadium
Attendance: 2,230
Referee: Liu Kwok Man
11 September 2009
20:00

Happy Valley	0–4	Kitchee
	Report	Luzardo 27'; Virgili 57', 66'; Lam Ka Wai 70'

Kowloon Bay Park
Attendance: 562
Referee: Lui Siu Chuen
12 September 2009
16:00

NT Realty Wofoo Tai Po	2–2	Citizen
Ye Jia 13'; Sze Kin Wai 24'	Report	Ju Yingzhi 56'; Rafinha 89'

Tai Po Sports Ground
Attendance: 923
Referee: Ng Kai Lam
13 September 2009
15:00

Fourway Rangers	1–0	Shatin
Paulo 45' (pen.)	Report

Sham Shui Po Sports Ground
Attendance: 653
Referee: Charlton Wong Chi Tang
13 September 2009
18:00

TSW Pegasus	( 1–0 )	Sun Hei
Lee Hong Lim 5'	Abandon; Report

Yuen Long Stadium
Attendance: –
Referee: Ng Chiu Kok
20 September 2009
18:00

TSW Pegasus	1–0	Sun Hei
Itaparica 39'	Replay; Report

Yuen Long Stadium
Attendance: 649
Referee: Ng Chiu Kok

=== Round 2 ===
9 September 2009
20:00

South China	1–0	Citizen
Schutz 90'	Report

Hong Kong Stadium
Attendance: 1,636
Referee: Ng Chiu Kok
19 September 2009
15:30

Shatin	1–3	Happy Valley
Lai Kai Cheuk 35'	Report	Godfred 45'; Ling Cong 50', 68'

Sha Tin Sports Ground
Attendance: 662
Referee: Charlton Wong Chi Tang
19 September 2009
20:00

Tai Chung	1–1	Kitchee
Moy 56'	Report	Virgili 58'

Kowloon Bay Park
Attendance: 406
Referee: Charlton Wong Chi Tang
20 September 2009
15:00

Fourway Rangers	( 3–1 )	Tuen Mun Progoal
Ondoua 41' (pen.), 84'; Liang Zicheng 65'	Cancelled; Report	Solabi 43'

Sham Shui Po Sports Ground
Attendance: 283
Referee: Chan Shui Hung
8 November 2009
15:00

Sun Hei	2–3	NT Realty Wofoo Tai Po
Chan Yiu Lun 2' (pen.), 72'	Report	So Loi Keung 38'; Chen Liming 45'; Ye Jia 80'

Tsing Yi Sports Ground
Attendance: 869
Referee: Charlton Wong Chi Tang

=== Round 3 ===
23 September 2009
20:00

South China	1–0	Fourway Rangers
Carrijo 45'	Report

Hong Kong Stadium
Attendance: 933
Referee: Lui Siu Chuen
25 September 2009
20:00

Tai Chung	1–0	TSW Pegasus
Alex 72'	Report

Kowloon Bay Park
Attendance: 330
Referee: Ng Kai Lam
26 September 2009
15:00

Tuen Mun Progoal	( 0–5 )	Kitchee
	Cancelled; Report	Virgili 39', 52', 89'; Lam Ka Wai 49'; Ubay Luzardo 60'

Tsing Yi Sports Ground
Attendance: 332
Referee: Ng Kai Lam
27 September 2009
15:00

NT Realty Wofoo Tai Po	4–0	Happy Valley
Annan 59', 86'; So Loi Keung 70' (pen.); Chen Liming 90'	Report

Tai Po Sports Ground
Attendance: 933
27 September 2009
20:00

Citizen	1–1	Sun Hei
Ju Yingzhi 23'	Report	Chan Yiu Lun 15' (pen.)

Siu Sai Wan Sports Ground
Attendance: 617
Referee: Liu Kwok Man

=== Round 4 ===
2 October 2009
20:00

Citizen	3–1	Shatin
Sandro 20'; Detinho 24'; Fung Kai Hong 69'	Report	Sham Kwok Keung 79'

Siu Sai Wan Sports Ground
Attendance: 275
Referee: Andy Wong Po On
3 October 2009
15:00

Fourway Rangers	2–0	Happy Valley
Yang Xu 21'; Paulo 61'	Report

Sham Shui Po Sports Ground
Attendance: 442
Referee: Liu Kwok Man
4 October 2009
16:00

Sun Hei	1–0	Kitchee
Cordeiro 42'	Report

Tsing Yi Sports Ground
Attendance: 1,166
Referee: Charlton Wong Chi Tang
4 October 2009
20:00

Tai Chung	( 2–0 )	Tuen Mun Progoal
Lukalu 26'; Alex 58'	Cancelled; Report

Kowloon Bay Park
Attendance: 171
Referee: Tong Kui Sum
3 January 2010
15:00

TSW Pegasus	2–2	South China
Itaparica 55', 88'	Report	Chan Siu Ki 13'; Bai He 22'

Yuen Long Stadium
Attendance: 3,953
Referee: Liu Kwok Man

=== Round 5 ===
16 October 2009
20:00

Happy Valley	2–2	Sun Hei
Ling Cong 4'; Annae 25'	Report	Cahê 62'; Akosah 67'

Kowloon Bay Park
Attendance: 239
Referee: Andy Wong Po On
17 October 2009
15:00

Citizen	1–0	Tai Chung
Detinho 38'	Report

Siu Sai Wan Sports Ground
Attendance: 262
Referee: Ng Kai Lam
17 October 2009
20:00

Tuen Mun Progoal	( 1–9 )	NT Realty Wofoo Tai Po
Tita 73'	Cancelled; Report	Annan 20', 59'; Sze Kin Wai 30', 46'; Ye Jia 34', 37', 55', 84'; Francis 70'

Tsing Yi Sports Ground
Attendance: 132
Referee: Charlton Wong Chi Tang
18 October 2009
15:00

Fourway Rangers	1–4	TSW Pegasus
Paulo 68'	Report	Lee Hong Lim 27', 42'; Machia 45'; Itaparica 90'

Sham Shui Po Sports Ground
Attendance: 746
Referee: Liu Kwok Man
15 December 2009
20:00

South China	6–0	Shatin
Schutz 6'; Chan Siu Ki 43', 57', 86'; Kwok Kin Pong 78', 90'	Report

Siu Sai Wan Sports Ground
Attendance: 524
Referee: Tong Kui Sum

=== Round 6 ===
24 October 2009
15:30

Shatin	4–1	NT Realty Wofoo Tai Po
Sham Kwok Keung 7'; Chu Siu Kei 40', 59', 90'	Report	Chen Liming 66'

Sha Tin Sports Ground
Attendance: 750
Referee: Ng Chiu Kok
24 October 2009
20:00

Sun Hei	4–1	Fourway Rangers
Chan Yiu Lun 11' (pen.); Cahê 73', 76', 88'	Report	Ondoua 58'

Tsing Yi Sports Ground
Attendance: 280
Referee: Lui Siu Chuen
25 October 2009
16:00

Citizen	7–0	Happy Valley
Sandro 3', 10', 41', 87', 90'; Law Chun Bong 51' (pen.); Yeung Chi Lun 81'	Report

Siu Sai Wan Sports Ground
Attendance: 278
Referee: Ng Kai Lam
25 October 2009
18:00

TSW Pegasus	( 9–1 )	Tuen Mun Progoal
Itaparica 7', 13', 89'; Machia 8', 57', 68'; Leung Kong Yiu 76' (o.g.); Leung Tsz Chun 81'; Li Ling Fung 87'	Cancelled; Report	Leung Ngo Hin 84'

Yuen Long Stadium
Attendance: 394
Referee: Andy Wong Po On
31 October 2009
15:00

Kitchee	2–1	South China
Chan Man Fai 8'; Chan Wai Ho 58' (o.g.)	Report	Carrijo 73'

Hong Kong Stadium
Attendance: 5,442
Referee: Ng Chiu Kok

=== Round 7 ===
21 November 2009
15:00

NT Realty Wofoo Tai Po	1–0	Fourway Rangers
So Loi Keung 45'	Report

Tai Po Sports Ground
Attendance: 1,115
Referee: Tong Kui Sum
27 November 2009
20:00

TSW Pegasus	4–2	Happy Valley
Lee Hong Lim 16'; Yuen Kin Man 39'; Machia 71', 90'	Report	Li Chun Yip 10'; Anane 90'

Yuen Long Stadium
Attendance: 530
Referee: Pau Sai Yin
28 November 2009
15:30

Shatin	0–2	Kitchee
	Report	Virgili 13', 79'

Sha Tin Sports Ground
Attendance: 744
Referee: Ng Chiu Kok
28 November 2009
20:00

Tuen Mun Progoal	Cancelled	South China

Tsing Yi Sports Ground
29 November 2009
20:00

Tai Chung	1–0	Sun Hei
Ngue 69'	Report

Kowloon Bay Park
Attendance: 292
Referee: Andy Wong Po On

=== Round 8 ===
14 November 2009
15:30

Shatin	1–3	Tai Chung
dos Santos 41'	Report	Ngue 49'; Lukalu 68'; Poon Man Tik 82' (pen.)

Sha Tin Sports Ground
Attendance: 420
Referee: Chow Chun Kit
22 November 2009
15:00

Sun Hei	3–1	South China
Lo Chi Kwan 27'; Chan Yiu Lun 70' (pen.); Cahê 83'	Report	Chan Siu Ki 50' (pen.)

Tsing Yi Sports Ground
Attendance: 944
Referee: Liu Kwok Man
18 December 2009
20:00

Happy Valley	Cancelled	Tuen Mun Progoal

Kowloon Bay Park
19 December 2009
15:00

NT Realty Wofoo Tai Po	1–2	TSW Pegasus
So Loi Keung 75' (pen.)	Report	Lai Man Fei 21'; Itaparica 21'

Tai Po Sports Ground
Attendance: 987
Referee: Ng Kai Lam
20 December 2009
15:00

Citizen	0–1	Kitchee
	Report	Lo Kwan Yee 90'

Siu Sai Wan Sports Ground
Attendance: 961
Referee: Charlton Wong Chi Tang

=== Round 9 ===
19 December 2009
20:00

Sun Hei	4–0	Shatin
So Wai Chuen 23'; Akosah 43', 90'; Chan Yiu Lun 49'	Report

Tsing Yi Sports Ground
Attendance: 150
Referee: Chan Shui Hung
9 January 2010
18:00

Tai Chung	0–2	Fourway Rangers
	Report	Paulo 45' (pen.); Bhengu 63'

Kowloon Bay Park
Attendance: 266
Referee: Ng Kai Lam
15 January 2010
20:00

Tuen Mun Progoal	Cancelled	Citizen

Tsing Yi Sports Ground
16 January 2010
17:30

South China	1–0	NT Realty Wofoo Tai Po
Leo 63'	Report

Hong Kong Stadium
Attendance: 1,847
Referee: Ng Chiu Kok
17 January 2010
18:00

TSW Pegasus	0–0	Kitchee
	Report

Yuen Long Stadium
Attendance: 1,549
Referee: Liu Kwok Man

=== Round 10 ===
16 January 2010
20:00

Happy Valley	1–1	Tai Chung
Tsang Chi Hau 24'	Report	Alex 57'

Kowloon Bay Park
Attendance: 322
Referee: Chan Shui Hung
22 January 2010
20:00

Sun Hei	Cancelled	Tuen Mun Progoal

Tsing Yi Sports Ground
23 January 2010
15:00

Shatin	1–1	TSW Pegasus
Neto 14'	Report	Mbome 79'

Sha Tin Sports Ground
Attendance: 630
Referee: Pau Sai Yin
23 January 2010
20:00

Kitchee	1–2	NT Realty Wofoo Tai Po
Liang Zicheng 4'	Report	To Hon To 42'; Yang Xu 80'

Hong Kong Stadium
Attendance: 644
Referee: Tong Kui Sum
24 January 2010
15:00

Fourway Rangers	0–0	Citizen
	Report

Sham Shui Po Sports Ground
Attendance: 375
Referee: Chan Shui Hung

=== Round 11 ===
11 October 2009
18:00

Kitchee	3–3	Fourway Rangers
Chan Man Fai 32'; Javi Pérez 69'; Virgili 90'	Report	Ondoua 23', 45'; Liang Zicheng 62'

Hong Kong Stadium
Attendance: 563
Referee: Lui Siu Chuen
15 November 2009
18:00

TSW Pegasus	1–1	Citizen
Martins 23'	Report	Sandro 25'

Yuen Long Stadium
Attendance: 581
Referee: Lui Siu Chuen
3 January 2010
20:00

Tai Chung	1–1	NT Realty Wofoo Tai Po
Alex 69'	Report	Chiu Chun Kit 9'

Kowloon Bay Park
Attendance: 331
Referee: Tong Kui Sum
24 January 2010
20:00

Happy Valley	2–6	South China
Ling Cong 47'; Chan Ming Kong 73'	Report	Leo 3'; Schutz 34'; Chan Siu Ki 44', 66', 80', 90'

Kowloon Bay Park
Attendance: 746
Referee: Charlton Wong Chi Tang
6 February 2010
15:00

Tuen Mun Progoal	Cancelled	Shatin

Tsing Yi Sports Ground

=== Round 12 ===
5 February 2010
20:00

Happy Valley	2–2	Shatin
Godfred 30'; Ling Cong 60' (pen.)	Report	Chu Siu Kei 27'; Storey 85'

Kowloon Bay Park
Attendance: 297
Referee: Ng Chiu Kok
20 February 2010
15:00

Citizen	1–1	South China
Sandro 50'	Report	Chao Pengfei 55'

Siu Sai Wan Sports Ground
Attendance: 890
Referee: Ng Kai Lam
20 February 2010
18:00

TSW Pegasus	2–1	NT Realty Wofoo Tai Po
Martins 47'; Lai Yiu Cheong 90'	Report	Annan 90'

Yuen Long Stadium
Attendance: 560
Referee: Charlton Wong Chi Tang
21 February 2010
15:00

Fourway Rangers	2–1	Sun Hei
Lam Hok Hei 22'; Ntombela 38'	Report	Chan Yiu Lun 89' (pen.)

Sham Shui Po Sports Ground
Attendance: 376
Referee: Liu Kwok Man
27 February 2010
15:00

Kitchee	2–0	Tai Chung
Minga 19'; Nsue 24'	Report

Siu Sai Wan Sports Ground
Attendance: 238
Referee: Tong Kui Sum

=== Round 13 ===
7 March 2010
15:00

Fourway Rangers	2–5	South China
Fan Weijun 60'; Lau Ka Shing 67'	Report	Leung Chun Pong 2'; Leo 7', 27'; Au Yeung Yiu Chung 52' (pen.); Wellingsson 88'

Sham Shui Po Sports Ground
Attendance: 923
Referee: Tong Kui Sum
11 March 2010
20:00

Kitchee	3–1	Shatin
Chan Man Fai 52'; Alex 68'; Nsue 73'	Report	Fabio 75'

Siu Sai Wan Sports Ground
Attendance: 122
Referee: Ng Chiu Kok
12 March 2010
20:00

Happy Valley	1–2	NT Realty Wofoo Tai Po
Godfred 82'	Report	Chen Liming 50'; Yang Xu 90'

Kowloon Bay Park
Attendance: 248
Referee: Andy Wong Po On
13 March 2010
18:00

TSW Pegasus	2–1	Tai Chung
Itaparica 4'; Mario 83'	Report	Ip Chung Long 80'

Yuen Long Stadium
Attendance: 566
Referee: Ng Kai Lam
14 March 2010
15:00

Sun Hei	0–3	Citizen
	Report	Detinho 6', 60'; Xu Deshuai 90'

Tsing Yi Sports Ground
Attendance: 372
Referee: Tong Kui Sum

=== Round 14 ===
2 February 2010
20:00

South China	3–2	Sun Hei
Leo 25'; Chan Siu Ki 26', 78' (pen.)	Report	Li Ming 68'; Cahê 71'

Hong Kong Stadium
Attendance: 1,557
Referee: Tong Kui Sum
18 March 2010
19:00

Citizen	1–1	Fourway Rangers
Detinho 53'	Report	Makhosonke 71'

Kowloon Bay Park
Attendance: 159
Referee: Charlton Wong Chi Tang
20 March 2010
15:00

NT Realty Wofoo Tai Po	2–2	Kitchee
Chen Liming 13'; Chan Hin Kwong 28'	Report	Perez 21'; Nsue 55'

Tai Po Sports Ground
Attendance: 719
Referee: Tong Kui Sum
20 March 2010
18:00

TSW Pegasus	1–0	Shatin
Deng Jinghuang 90'	Report

Yuen Long Stadium
Attendance: 448
Referee: Chan Shui Hung
21 March 2010
18:00

Tai Chung	1–1	Happy Valley
Yip Tsz Chun 18'	Report	Fung Chung Ting 82'

Kowloon Bay Park
Attendance: 255
Referee: Chow Chun Kit

=== Round 15 ===
26 March 2010
20:00

Happy Valley	0–0	Citizen
	Report

Kowloon Bay Park
Attendance: 202
Referee: Chan Shui Hung
27 March 2010
20:00

Sun Hei	3–0	Tai Chung
Cahê 3'; Yamamoto 36'; Bamnjo 68'	Report

Tsing Yi Sports Ground
Attendance: 212
Referee: Ng Chiu Kok
28 March 2010
15:00

NT Realty Wofoo Tai Po	0–0	Shatin
	Report

Tai Po Sports Ground
Attendance: 461
Referee: Andy Wong Po On
21 May 2010
15:00

South China	2–1	Kitchee
Kwok Kin Pong 56'; Schutz 65'	Report	Lo Kwan Yee 40'

Hong Kong Stadium
Attendance: 3,276
Referee: Ng Chiu Kwok
22 May 2010
18:00

TSW Pegasus	3–0	Fourway Rangers
Luk Koon Pong 17'; Cheung Kin Fung 45'; Lee Hong Lim 90' (pen.)	Report

Yuen Long Stadium
Attendance: 410
Referee: Pau Sai Yin

=== Round 16 ===
8 April 2010
20:00

Citizen	4–1	TSW Pegasus
Fagner 22', 54'; Xu Deshuai 42', 67'	Report	Itaparica 71'

Siu Sai Wan Sports Ground
Attendance: 159
Referee: Charlton Wong Chi Tang
9 April 2010
20:00

Tai Chung	1–1	Shatin
Poon Man Tik 33'	Report	Neto 6'

Kowloon Bay Park
Attendance: 250
Referee: Ng Kai Lam
10 April 2010
15:00

Fourway Rangers	1–1	Kitchee
Ondoua 66'	Report	Alex 48'

Sham Shui Po Sports Ground
Attendance: 359
Referee: Tong Kui Sum
23 May 2010
15:00

NT Realty Wofoo Tai Po	2–4	Sun Hei
To Hon To 27'; Sze Kin Wai 48'	Report	Cahê 20', 56' (pen.), 78'; Chan Yiu Lun 73'

Tai Po Sports Ground
Attendance: 486
Referee: Liu Kwok Man
25 May 2010
20:00

South China	6–1	Happy Valley
Wellingsson 17'; Chao Pengfei 47', 70', 78'; Au Yeung Yiu Chung 82'; Schutz 87'	Report	Godfred 64'

Siu Sai Wan Sports Ground
Attendance: 546
Referee: Chan Shui Hung

=== Round 17 ===
11 April 2010
15:00

NT Realty Wofoo Tai Po	1–3	South China
Ye Jia 88'	Report	Leung Chun Pong 6'; Wellingsson 56'; Au Yeung Yiu Chung 83'

Tai Po Sports Ground
Attendance: 1,587
Referee: Andy Wong Po On
16 April 2010
20:00

Happy Valley	1–4	TSW Pegasus
Ling Cong 24'	Report	Itaparica 8', 47' (pen.); Leung Tsz Chun 40'; Yeung Ching Kwong 90'

Kowloon Bay Park
Attendance: 261
Referee: Andy Wong Po On
17 April 2010
15:00

Kitchee	3–2	Sun Hei
Luzardo 19' (pen.), 30' (pen.); Alex 55'	Report	Lo Chi Kwan 51', 72'

Sham Shui Po Sports Ground
Attendance: 530
Referee: Lui Siu Chuen
18 April 2010
15:00

Fourway Rangers	1–1	Tai Chung
Fan Weijun 16'	Report	Yuan Yang 70'

Sham Shui Po Sports Ground
Attendance: 195
Referee: Liu Kwok Man
18 April 2010
15:30

Shatin	2–0	Citizen
Sham Kwok Keung 25'; Neto 68'	Report

Sha Tin Sports Ground
Attendance: 266
Referee: Charlton Wong Chi Tang

=== Round 18 ===
28 March 2010
16:00

South China	3–2	TSW Pegasus
Schutz 64', 74', 77'	Report	Itaparica 17', 43'

Siu Sai Wan Sports Ground
Attendance: 1,478
Referee: Liu Kwok Man
23 April 2010
20:00

Happy Valley	1–0	Fourway Rangers
Li Chun Yip 54' (pen.)	Report

Kowloon Bay Park
Attendance: 260
Referee: Tong Kui Sum
24 April 2010
15:00

NT Realty Wofoo Tai Po	0–1	Tai Chung
	Report	Chen Liming 49' (o.g.)

Tai Po Sports Ground
Attendance: 379
Referee: Charlton Wong Chi Tang
24 April 2010
15:30

Shatin	1–1	Sun Hei
Fabio 90'	Report	Cahê 58'

Sha Tin Sports Ground
Attendance: 347
Referee: Andy Wong Po On
25 April 2010
15:00

Kitchee	2–2	Citizen
Minga 76'; Ma Ka Ki 79' (o.g.)	Report	Sandro 31'; Paulinho 37' (pen.)

Sham Shui Po Sports Ground
Attendance: 556
Referee: Liu Kwok Man

=== Round 19 ===
30 April 2010
20:00

Tai Chung	1–3	Citizen
Yip Tsz Chun 52'	Report	Law Chun Bong 61'; Detinho 78'; Ju Yingzhi 86'

Kowloon Bay Park
Attendance: 229
Referee: Chow Chun Kit
1 May 2010
15:00

Fourway Rangers	1–1	NT Realty Wofoo Tai Po
Ondoua 37'	Report	To Hon To 56'

Sham Shui Po Sports Ground
Attendance: 315
Referee: Charlton Wong Chi Tang
1 May 2010
16:00

Kitchee	0–0	TSW Pegasus
	Report

Siu Sai Wan Sports Ground
Attendance: 407
Referee: Tong Kui Sum
2 May 2010
15:30

Shatin	2–2	South China
Sham Kwok Keung 17'; Fabio 90'	Report	Li Haiqiang 89'; Sidrailson 90'

Sha Tin Sports Ground
Attendance: 1,168
Referee: Andy Wong Po On
2 May 2010
20:00

Sun Hei	6–0	Happy Valley
Cordeiro 14'; Li Ming 45' (pen.); Cahê 54', 69'; Lau Chi Keung 84'; Fujii 89'	Report

Tsing Yi Sports Ground
Attendance: 176
Referee: Liu Kwok Man

=== Round 20 ===
6 May 2010
20:00

Sun Hei	2–3	TSW Pegasus
Cahê 32'; Lo Chi Kwan 81'	Report	Itaparica 37', 58'; Mbome 48'

Tsing Yi Sports Ground
Attendance: 217
Referee: Ng Chiu Kok
8 May 2010
15:00

Citizen	0–1	NT Realty Wofoo Tai Po
	Report	Ye Jia 74' (pen.)

Siu Sai Wan Sports Ground
Attendance: 228
Referee: Liu Kwok Man
9 May 2010
15:00

Kitchee	6–0	Happy Valley
Alex 16'; Nsue 48'; Minga 75'; Chan Man Fai 76'; Cheng Siu Wai 87', 90'	Report

Sham Shui Po Sports Ground
Attendance: 369
Referee: Charlton Wong Chi Tang
9 May 2010
15:30

Shatin	1–1	Fourway Rangers
Fabio 24'	Report	Tita 32'

Sha Tin Sports Ground
Attendance: 246
Referee: Pau Sai Yin
16 May 2010
20:00

Tai Chung	0 – 3 (awarded)	South China
Cheng King Ho 45'	Report	Lee Wai Lim 45'

Kowloon Bay Park
Attendance: 822
Referee: Liu Kwok Man

== Stadiums ==
Locations of the Hong Kong First Division League 2009–10 venues

Team	Stadium	Capacity
Citizen	Siu Sai Wan Sports Ground	12,000
Fourway Rangers	Sham Shui Po Sports Ground	2,194
Happy Valley	Kowloon Bay Park	1,200
Kitchee	Hong Kong Stadium	40,000
Kitchee	Sham Shui Po Sports Ground	2,194
NT Realty Wofoo Tai Po	Tai Po Sports Ground	3,000
NT Realty Wofoo Tai Po	Tseung Kwan O Sports Ground	3,500
Shatin	Sha Tin Sports Ground	3,000
South China	Hong Kong Stadium	40,000
Sun Hei	Tsing Yi Sports Ground	1,500
TSW Pegasus	Yuen Long Stadium	4,932
Tai Chung	Kowloon Bay Park	1,200
Tuen Mun Progoal	Tsing Yi Sports Ground	1,500

^1 Since the Hong Kong Stadium held 2009 East Asian Games in December and 2010 Hong Kong Sevens in March, Kitchee and South China used Siu Sai Wan Sports Ground sometimes after December.

^2 NT Realty Wofoo Tai Po use Tseung Kwan O Sports Ground for 2010 AFC Cup due to Tai Po Sports Ground failed the criteria set by Asian Football Confederation.

^3 Sham Shui Po Sports Ground is the home stadium of Kitchee in later of season.

== Top scorers ==
Rank	Scorer	Club	Goals
1	Cahê	Sun Hei	14
2	Itaparica	TSW Pegasus	13
3	Chan Siu Ki	South China	11
4	Sandro	Citizen	9
5	Tales Schutz	South China	8
5	Chan Yiu Lun	Sun Hei	8
7	Alex Akande	Tai Chung / Kitchee	7
8	Detinho	Citizen	6
8	Ling Cong	Happy Valley	6
8	Albert Virgili	Kitchee	6

Only players scored ≥6 is shown.

== Records ==
=== Team records ===
As at the match played on 2 January 2010

- Highest Scoring Match: TSW Pegasus 9–1 Tuen Mun Progoal (Round 6)
- Biggest Goal Difference: TSW Pegasus 9–1 Tuen Mun Progoal (Round 6)
- Biggest Home Victory: TSW Pegasus 9–1 Tuen Mun Progoal (Round 6)
- Biggest Home Defeat: Tuen Mun Progoal 1–9 NT Realty Wofoo Tai Po (Round 5)
- Most Consecutive Wins: South China 4;6 September 2009 – 15 December 2009
- Longest Undefeated Steak: TSW Pegasus 4; 18 October 2009 – 19 December 2009;
- Most Consecutive Draws: Citizen 2 – 12 September 2009 – 27 September 2009;
- Longest Losing Streak: Tuen Mun Progoal 5; 20 September 2009 – 25 October 2009
- Longest Winless Streak: Tuen Mun Progoal 5; 20 September 2009 – 25 October 2009
- Highest Attendance: 5,442 Kitchee 2–1 South China (Round 6)) @ Hong Kong Stadium
- Lowest Attendance: 132 Tuen Mun Progoal 1–9 NT Realty Wofoo Tai Po (Round 5) @ Tsing Yi Sports Ground
- Highest Gate Receipt: $159,740 Kitchee 2–1 South China (Round 6))
- Lowest Gate Receipt: $1,780 (Tuen Mun Progoal 1–9 NT Realty Wofoo Tai Po (Round 5))
- Average Attendance: 770
- Average Goals: 3.52 goals

=== Individual records ===
- Most Goals in a match: Sandro of Citizen – 5 (Citizen 7–0 Happy Valley (Round 6))
- Fastest Goal : 2' Chan Yiu Lun of Sun Hei (Sun Hei 2–3 NT Realty Wofoo Tai Po (Round 2))
