= 2009–10 Hong Kong Senior Shield =

Tournament details
- Country: Hong Kong
- Teams: 11

Final positions
- Champions: South China (30th title)
- Runners-up: Kitchee

Tournament statistics
- Matches played: 10
- Goals scored: 28 (2.8 per match)
- Attendance: 17,269 (1,727 per match)
- Top goal scorer: (Hong Kong) Chan Siu Ki (South China) (4 goals)

Awards
- Best player: (Hong Kong) Chan Siu Ki (South China)

Hong Kong Senior Shield 2009–10, officially named as Canbo Senior Shield (Chinese: 康寶高級組銀牌) due to the competition's sponsorship by Guangdong Canbo Electrical, was the 108th season of one of the Asian oldest football knockout competition, Hong Kong Senior Shield. It was a knockout competition for all the teams of Hong Kong First Division League. The winner South China has guaranteed a place in the 2011 AFC Cup.

== Calendar ==
Round	Date	Matches	Clubs
First round	10 October 2008 – 11 October 2008	5	11 → 8
Quarter-finals	25 December 2008 – 26 December 2008	4	8 → 4
Semi-finals	10 Januany 2008	2	4 → 2
Final	30 Januany 2008	1	2 → 1

== Teams ==
Team	Last year Performance	Title
Kitchee	Quarter-finalists	5
Citizen	Quarter-finalists	0
Fourway Rangers	Semi-finalists	0
Happy Valley	First round	5
Shatin	No Appearance	0
Sun Hei	Runners-up	1
South China	Semi-finalist	29
Tai Chung	No Appearance	0
NT Realty Wofoo Tai Po	First round	0
TSW Pegasus	Winners	1
Tuen Mun Progoal	First round	0

== Bracket ==
Quarter-finals
25 December - Hong Kong
Fourway Rangers	1
Kitchee	3
26 December - Siu Sai Wan
TSW Pegasus	3
Citizen	2
26 December - Siu Sai Wan
Sun Hei	2
NT Realty Wofoo Tai Po	1
25 December - Hong Kong
South China	3
Tai Chung	0

Semi-finals
10 January - Yuen Long
Kitchee	3
TSW Pegasus	2
10 January - Yuen Long
Sun Hei	0
South China	2

Final
30 January - Siu Sai Wan
Kitchee	2
South China	4

== First round ==
10 October 2009
14:00

Tuen Mun Progoal	0–2	Tai Chung
	Report	Poon Man Tik 20'; Chan Ka Chun 32'

Siu Sai Wan Sports Ground
Attendance: 401
Referee: Pau Sai Yin

10 October 2009
16:00

NT Realty Wofoo Tai Po	3–0	Happy Valley
Annan 5'; Ye Jia 67'; Wong Chun Ho 75' (o.g.)	Report

Siu Sai Wan Sports Ground
Attendance: 401
Referee: Liu Kwok Man

11 October 2009
15:00

Shatin	0–2	Citizen
	Report	Detinho 2'; Sandro 20'

Tsing Yi Sports Ground
Attendance: 273
Referee: Tong Kui Sum

== Quarter-finals ==
25 December 2009
14:00

Fourway Rangers	1–3	Kitchee
Fan Weijun 48'	Report	Luzardo 42'; Nsue 55'; Cheng Lai Hin 90'

Hong Kong Stadium
Attendance: 2,537
Referee: Liu Kwok Man

25 December 2009
16:00

South China	3–0	Tai Chung
Lee Wai Lim 67'; Chan Siu Ki 84', 86'	Report

Hong Kong Stadium
Attendance: 2,537
Referee: Pau Sai Yin

26 December 2009
14:00

Sun Hei	2–1 (a.e.t.)	NT Realty Wofoo Tai Po
Akosah 12'; Cahe 115'	Report	Ye Jia 45'

Siu Sai Wan Sports Ground
Attendance: 834
Referee: Ng Chiu Kwok

26 December 2009
16:00

TSW Pegasus	3–2 (a.e.t.)	Citizen
Lee Hong Lim 2', 41'; Itaparica 105'	Report	Wong Yiu Fu 49'; Law Chun Bong 77'

Siu Sai Wan Sports Ground
Attendance: 834
Referee: Gary Wong Po On

== Semi-finals ==
10 January 2010
14:00

Kitchee	3–2	TSW Pegasus
Minga 13'; Nsue 69'; Luzardo 90+' (pen.)	Report	Machia 2'; Luk Koon Pong 39'

Yuen Long Stadium
Attendance: 3,526
Referee: Tong Kui Sum

10 January 2010
16:00

Sun Hei	0–2	South China
	Report	Chan Siu Ki 26'; T. Schutz 82'

Yuen Long Stadium
Attendance: 3,526
Referee: Liu Kwok Man

== Final ==
30 January 2010
15:00

Kitchee	2–4	South China
Liang Zicheng 24'; Baruc 53'	Report	T. Schutz 68'; Leo 69', 90'; Chan Siu Ki 79'

Siu Sai Wan Sports Ground
Attendance: 2,760
Referee: Pau Sai Yin

Kitchee	South China

KITCHEE:
GK	17	(Spain) Sergio Aure
RB	27	(Hong Kong) Liu Quankun
CB	5	(Spain) Ubay Luzardo
CB	17	(Spain) Xavi Pérez
LB	20	(Hong Kong) Li Hang Wui		(substituted off) 83'
DM	6	(Hong Kong) Gao Wen		(substituted off) 83'
CM	18	(Equatorial Guinea) Baruc Nsue
CM	10	(Hong Kong) Lam Ka Wai
RF	12	(Hong Kong) Lo Kwan Yee (c)
CF	7	(Republic of the Congo) Edson Minga
LF	9	(China) Liang Zicheng	(yellow card) 56'	(substituted off) 73'
Substitutes:
GK	1	(China) Wang Zhenpeng
DF	21	(Hong Kong) Tsang Kam To
MF	8	(Hong Kong) Li Ka Chun
MF	15	(Hong Kong) Ngan Lok Fung
MF	13	(Hong Kong) Chan Man Fai		(substituted on) 83'
FW	14	(Hong Kong) Cheng Siu Wai		(substituted on) 83'
FW	19	(Hong Kong) Cheng Lai Hin		(substituted on) 76'
Coach:
(Spain) Josep Gombau

SOUTH CHINA:
GK	23	(Hong Kong) Zhang Chunhui
RB	2	(Hong Kong) Lee Chi Ho
CB	4	(Brazil) Sidraílson	(yellow card) 70'
CB	15	(Hong Kong) Chan Wai Ho
LB	6	(Hong Kong) Wong Chin Hung
DM	5	(Hong Kong) Bai He
RM	18	(Hong Kong) Kwok Kin Pong
LM	30	(Brazil) Tales Schutz		(substituted off) 90'
AM	11	(Hong Kong) Li Haiqiang (c)		(substituted off) 88'
RF	33	(Brazil) Leo
LF	7	(Hong Kong) Chan Siu Ki	(yellow card) 57'
Substitutes:
GK	17	(Hong Kong) Ho Kwok Chuen
DF	3	(Hong Kong) Poon Yiu Cheuk
DF	22	(Hong Kong) Gerard Ambassa Guy
MF	10	(Hong Kong) Au Yeung Yiu Chung
MF	16	(Hong Kong) Leung Chun Pong		(substituted on) 88'
MF	21	(Hong Kong) Man Pei Tak
FW	9	(Hong Kong) Lee Wai Lim		(substituted on) 90'
Coach:
(South Korea) Kim Pan-Gon

MATCH OFFICIALS

- Assistant referees:
  - Ng Kai Lam
  - Chan Shui Hung
- Fourth official: Charlton Wong Chi Tang

MATCH RULES

- 90 minutes.
- 30 minutes of extra-time if necessary.
- Penalty shoot-out if scores still level.
- Seven named substitutes
- Maximum of 3 substitutions.

== Scorers ==
The scorers in the 2009–10 Hong Kong Senior Shield are as follows:

4 goals

- (Hong Kong) Chan Siu Ki (South China)

3 goals

- (Equatorial Guinea) Baruc Nsue (Kitchee)

2 goals

- (Hong Kong) Lee Hong Lim (TSW Pegasus)
- (China) Ye Jia (NT Realty Wofoo Tai Po)
- (Spain) Ubay Luzardo (Kitchee)
- (Brazil) Leo (South China)
- (Brazil) Tales Schutz (South China)

1 goal

- (Hong Kong) Poon Man Tik (Tai Chung)
- (Hong Kong) Chan Ka Chun (Tai Chung)
- (Ghana) Christian Annan (NT Realty Wofoo Tai Po)
- (Brazil) Detinho (Citizen)

1 goal

- (Brazil) Sandro (Citizen)
- (Hong Kong) Wong Yiu Fu (Citizen)
- (Hong Kong) Law Chun Bong (Citizen)
- (China) Fan Weijun (Fourway Rangers)
- (Hong Kong) Cheng Lai Hin (Kitchee)
- (Republic of the Congo) Edson Minga (Kitchee)
- (China) Liang Zicheng (Kitchee)
- (Hong Kong) Lee Wai Lim (South China)
- (Hong Kong) Julius Akosah (Sun Hei)
- (Brazil) Cahe (Sun Hei)
- (Brazil) Itaparica (TSW Pegasus)
- (Brazil) Georges-Andre Machia (TSW Pegasus)
- (Hong Kong) Luk Koon Pong (TSW Pegasus)

Own goals

- (Hong Kong) Wong Chun Ho (Happy Valley) (for NT Realty Wofoo Tai Po)

== Prizes ==
Top Scorer Award	Player of the Tournament
(Hong Kong) Chan Siu Ki (South China)	(Hong Kong) Chan Siu Ki (South China)
