= List of TSW Pegasus FC managers =

TSW Pegasus FC is an association football club founded in 2008. The club has had eight managers, in twelve tenures. The club was known as TSW Pegasus FC from 2008 to 2012, as Sun Pegasus FC from 2012 to 2015, as Hong Kong Pegasus FC from 2015 to 2020, and reverted to TSW Pegasus FC in 2020.

== Managers ==
Only league matches are counted.

Name	Nationality	From	To	G	W	D	L	Win %^{[A]}	Honours and/or notes
José Ricardo Rambo	Brazil	1 July 2008	30 June 2009	24	12	5	7	50	Hong Kong Senior Challenge Shield winners 2008–09
Dejan Antonić	Serbia	August 2009	30 December 2009	2	1	0	1	50	—
José Ricardo Rambo	Brazil	30 December 2009	30 June 2010	16	9	5	2	56.25	Hong Kong FA Cup winners 2009–10
Chan Hiu Ming	China (Hong Kong)	1 July 2010	14 June 2012	18	12	2	4	66.67	—
Chan Ho Yin	China (Hong Kong)	10 July 2012	19 October 2012	5	1	2	2	20	—
Chan Chi Hong	China (Hong Kong)	9 October 2012	9 June 2014	31	13	9	9	41.94	—
José Ricardo Rambo	Brazil	9 June 2014	27 January 2015	10	6	2	2	60	—
Chan Chi Hong	China (Hong Kong)	27 January 2015	30 June 2015	6	2	1	3	33.33	—
Lee Chi Kin	China (Hong Kong)	8 July 2015	11 April 2016	14	4	5	5	28.57	—
Kevin Bond	United Kingdom	11 April 2016	May 2016	2	0	0	2	0	Hong Kong FA Cup winners 2015–16; Hong Kong Sapling Cup winners 2015–16
Steve Gallen	Republic of Ireland	23 June 2016	3 November 2016	6	2	2	2	33.33	—
Kevin Bond	United Kingdom	7 November 2016	Present	0	0	0	0	0	—

== Notes ==
- A The winning percentage listed is rounded to two decimal places.
