= Ip Chung Long =

Hong Kong footballer

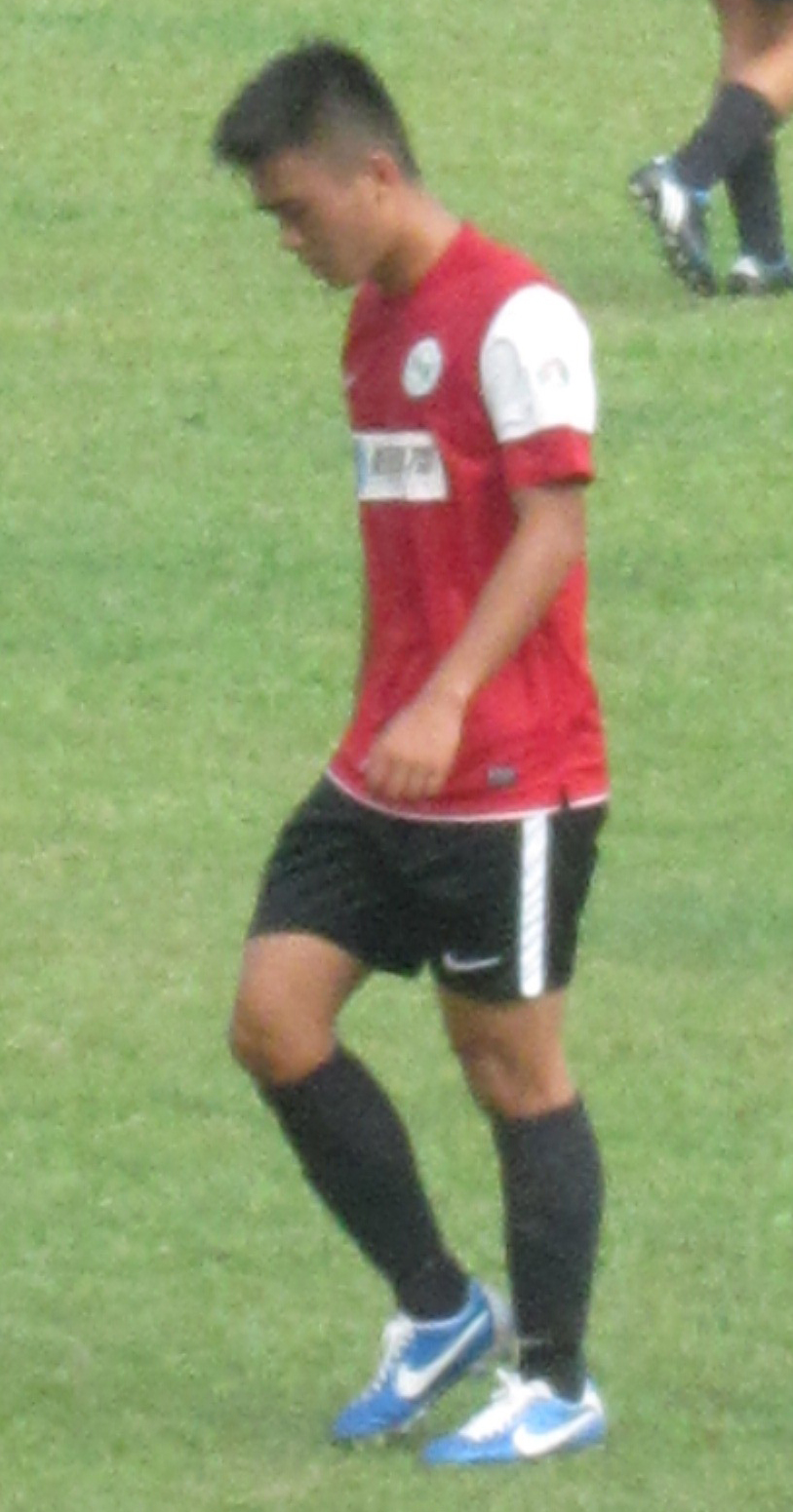
- Ip Chung Long playing for Southern against Tai Po on 29 September 2012

Personal information
- Full name: Ip Chung Long
- Date of birth: 16 November 1989 (age 36)
- Place of birth: Hong Kong
- Height: 1.71 m (5 ft 7 in)
- Position: Midfielder

Youth career
- Kitchee

Senior career*
Years	Team	Apps	(Gls)
2006–2007	Shatin	8	(9)
2007–2011	Kitchee	15	(1)
2010–2011	→ Tai Chung (loan)	23	(3)
2011–2012	Hong Kong Rangers	12	(0)
2012–2014	Southern	33	(4)
2014–2015	Pegasus	6	(0)
2015–2016	Yuen Long	14	(2)
2016–2017	Hong Kong Rangers	18	(2)
2017–2018	Yuen Long	17	(0)
2019–2020	South China	8	(1)
2021–2024	Hoi King	51	(3)
2024–2025	Tung Sing	19	(2)
2025–	Hoi King	17	(1)

International career^{‡}
2008–2012	Hong Kong U-23		
2010	Hong Kong	1	(0)
Medal record
Representing Hong Kong
East Asian Games
Gold medal – first place	2009 Hong Kong	Football
- * Club domestic league appearances and goals as of 4 January 2025 ‡ National team caps and goals as of 17:44, 31 August 2014 (UTC)

Ip Chung Long (Chinese: 葉頌朗; Jyutping: jip^{6} zung^{6} long^{5}, born 16 November 1989 in Hong Kong) is a former Hong Kong professional footballer who played as a midfielder. He is now a police.

== Club career ==
=== Kitchee ===
In the 2007–08 season, Ip Chung Long made his debut of the season in the first AFC Cup group stage match against Singapore Armed Forces in Singapore as a 46th-minute substitute for Gao Wen. On 2 March 2008, he played his first Hong Kong League Cup game in the semi-final match against Convoy Sun Hei, which the team won 2–0. However, he did not feature the final of the cup. He scored his first goal for Kitchee in the 4th round of AFC Cup group stage match, although the goal could not help the team to win over Malaysian club Perak. On 20 April 2008, he made his first league appearance of the season, helping the team to win over Convoy Sun Hei. In conclusion, he made 3 league games and 1 Hong Kong League Cup game. For continental cup, he made 5 out of 6 AFC Cup group stage matches for Kitchee and scored 1 goal.

In the 2008–09 season, Ip Chung Long made his first league appearance of the season in the second league match for Kitchee, in the match against Mutual as a 75-minute substitute for Jaimes McKee on 14 September 2008. On 17 October 2008, he started for the team for the first time, helping the team to win over Xiangxue Eisiti. On 13 December 2008, he scored his first goal of the season in the 6–0 victory against Tuen Mun Progoal.

In the 2009–10 season, he played his first match of the season in the match against Tai Chung on 19 September 2009, replaced Chan Man Fai in the 65th minute. He made his second league appearance of the season in the match versus Tuen Mun Progoal on 26 September 2009, as a substitute in the 63rd minute. This was also his last league game for Kitchee, as he was loaned to Tai Chung in the second half of the season, and eventually left the club and joined Rangers in 2011.

=== Tai Chung ===
Ip Chung Long was loaned to Tai Chung in the second half of the 2009–10 season. He played his first match for Tai Chung in the match against his parent club Kitchee on 27 February 2012. On 13 March 2012, he scored his first goal for Tai Chung in the match against TSW Pegasus. However, the team lost 1–2 to TSW Pegasus as Mario scored the winning goal in the 83rd minute for Pegasus, 3 minutes after Ip scored. Ip Chung Long made a total of 9 league appearances and scored 1 goal. He also played 1 Hong Kong League Cup game for Tai Chung.

In the 2010–11 season, he was one of the key players of Tai Chung. He featured 14 league matches and scored 2 goals. For cup matches, he played 1 match in Hong Kong Senior Challenge Shield, Hong Kong FA Cup and Hong Kong League Cup respectively. On the other hand, he was chosen as the captain of the team for the first time in the match against Wofoo Tai Po in Tai Po Sports Ground on 10 April 2010.

He returned to Kitchee after the end of 2010–11 season and eventually transferred to Rangers.

=== Rangers ===
Ip Chung Long joined Rangers in the beginning of the 2011–12 season, after spending 5 seasons in Kitchee and Tai Chung. He was given kit number 8.

He played his debut for Rangers in the first league match of the club against the home side Pegasus, although they lost the match. He featured in a total of 12 league matches but did not score any goals. For cup games, he played 2 Hong Kong Senior Challenge Shield and Hong Kong FA Cup respectively. He also featured 1 Hong Kong League Cup match. However, the team did not win the game and was eliminated in quarter-final.

=== Southern ===
Ip Chung Long joined the newly promoted club Southern after spending one season with Rangers.

=== Yuen Long ===
On 29 June 2017, Ip signed a contract to return to Yuen Long for a second time.

Following the final match of the season on 13 May 2018, Ip retired from professional football and joined the Hong Kong Police Force.

=== South China ===
On 12 January 2020, Ip Chung Long got sent off during a First Division League game against North District, afterward he got shouted at by one of the North District players as a "Damn Corrupted Cop".

== Career statistics ==
=== Club ===
As of 2 October 2012

Club performance			League		Cup				League Cup		Continental		Total	
Season	Club	League	Apps	Goals	Apps	Goals	Apps	Goals	Apps	Goals	Apps	Goals	Apps	Goals
Hong Kong			League		Senior Shield		FA Cup		League Cup		AFC Cup		Total	
2006–07	Kitchee	First Division	1	0	0	0	0	0	0	0	N/A	N/A	1	0
2007–08	Kitchee	First Division	3	0	0	0	1	0	0	0	5	1	9	1
2008–09	Kitchee	First Division	9	1	0	0	1	0	0	0	N/A	N/A	10	1
2009–10	Kitchee	First Division	2	0	0	0	—	—	0	0	N/A	N/A	2	0
Kitchee Total			15	1	0	0	2	0	0	0	5	1	22	2
2009–10	Tai Chung (loan)	First Division	9	1	0	0	—	—	1	0	N/A	N/A	10	1
2010–11	Tai Chung (loan)	First Division	14	2	1	0	1	0	1	0	N/A	N/A	17	2
Tai Chung Total			23	3	1	0	1	0	2	0	0	0	27	3
2011–12	Rangers	First Division	12	0	2	0	1	0	2	0	N/A	N/A	17	0
Rangers Total			12	0	2	0	1	0	2	0	0	0	17	0
2012–13	Southern	First Division	2	0	0	0	0	0	0	0	N/A	N/A	2	0
Southern Total			2	0	0	0	0	0	0	0	0	0	2	0
Career Total			52	4	3	0	4	0	4	0	5	1	68	5

=== International ===
As of 7 January 2010.

#	Date	Venue	Opponent	Result	Scored	Competition
1	6 January 2010	National Stadium, Madinat 'Isa, Bahrain	Bahrain	0–4	0	2011 AFC Asian Cup qualification

== Honours ==
Yuen Long

- Hong Kong Senior Shield: 2017–18
