= 2008–09 Hong Kong Second Division League =

2008–09 Hong Kong Second Division League is the 95th season of a football league in Hong Kong, Hong Kong Second Division League.

== Changes from last season ==
=== From Second Division ===
Promoted to First Division

- Mutual

Relegated to Third Division

- Lucky Mile
- New Fair Kuitan

=== To Second Division ===
Relegated from First Division

- Bulova Rangers (renamed as Rangers)

Promoted from Third Division League

- Shatin
- Wing Yee

=== Name changing ===
- Bulova Rangers renamed as Rangers
- EU Tai Chung renamed as Advance Tai Chung

== League table ==
Pos	Team	Pld	W	D	L	GF	GA	GD	Pts	Promotion or relegation
1	Shatin (C, P)	18	15	2	1	79	13	+66	47	Promotion to First Division League
2	Advance Tai Chung (P)	18	13	3	2	51	20	+31	42	Promotion to First Division League
3	HKFC	18	10	5	3	68	19	+49	35	
4	Wing Yee	18	9	1	8	39	31	+8	28	
5	Fukien	18	8	1	9	32	34	−2	25	
6	Rangers	18	6	5	7	32	32	0	23	
7	Kwai Tsing	18	5	5	8	25	28	−3	20	
8	Double Flower	18	5	2	11	10	54	−44	17	
9	Tung Po (R)	18	3	7	8	32	65	−33	16	Relegation to Third Division League
10	Kwok Keung (R)	18	0	1	17	13	86	−73	1	Relegation to Third Division League

Updated to match(es) played on 24 April 2009. Source: The Hong Kong Football Association
(C) Champions; (P) Promoted; (R) Relegated

== Top scorers ==
Rank	Scorer	Club	Goals
1	Yau Ping Kai	Wing Yee	19
2	Chan Kung Pok	Shatin	15
3	Hon Shing	Shatin	14
4	Lawrence Akandu	Shatin	13
4	Ho Min Tong	Shatin	13
6	Tony Hamilton-Bram	HKFC	12
6	James Daws	Tung Po	12
8	Allan Fraser	HKFC	11
9	Niklas Sandor	HKFC	9
10	So Sheung Kwai	Advance Tai Chung	8

Only players scored ≥8 is shown.
