= Brett Storey =

English footballer

Personal information
- Full name: Brett Barry Storey
- Date of birth: 7 July 1977 (age 49)
- Place of birth: Sheffield, England
- Height: 5 ft 11 in (1.80 m)
- Position: Midfielder

Senior career*
Years	Team	Apps	(Gls)
1995–1996	Sheffield United	0	(0)
1995–1996	Lincoln City	2	(1)
- * Club domestic league appearances and goals

Brett Barry Storey (born 7 July 1977) is an English footballer who played in the Football League for Lincoln City.

== Playing career ==
After beginning his career with Sheffield United, Storey joined Lincoln City making his Football League debut in the club's 2–1 home victory over Mansfield Town on 13 April 1996. His second, and final, appearance for the club saw him score in a 5–0 home victory over Torquay United on 4 May 1996.

He joined Matlock Town at the start of the 1997–98 season before moving on to join then Football Conference side Stalybridge Celtic. With Mel Sterland replacing Brian Kettle as manager, Storey found himself surplus to requirements at the Bower Fold based club and returned to Matlock Town in January 1998 before swiftly moving on to join Alfreton Town.

In August 1998 he linked up with Leigh RMI before returning to Alfreton Town at the end of September 1998.

On 5 July 2010, Storey signed for Staveley Miners Welfare after returning to England following a spell playing in Hong Kong for Shatin. He made his debut for the club in the 2–0 Northern Counties East League victory at Louth Town on 4 September 2010.
