= Li Haiqiang =

Hong Kong footballer (born 1977)

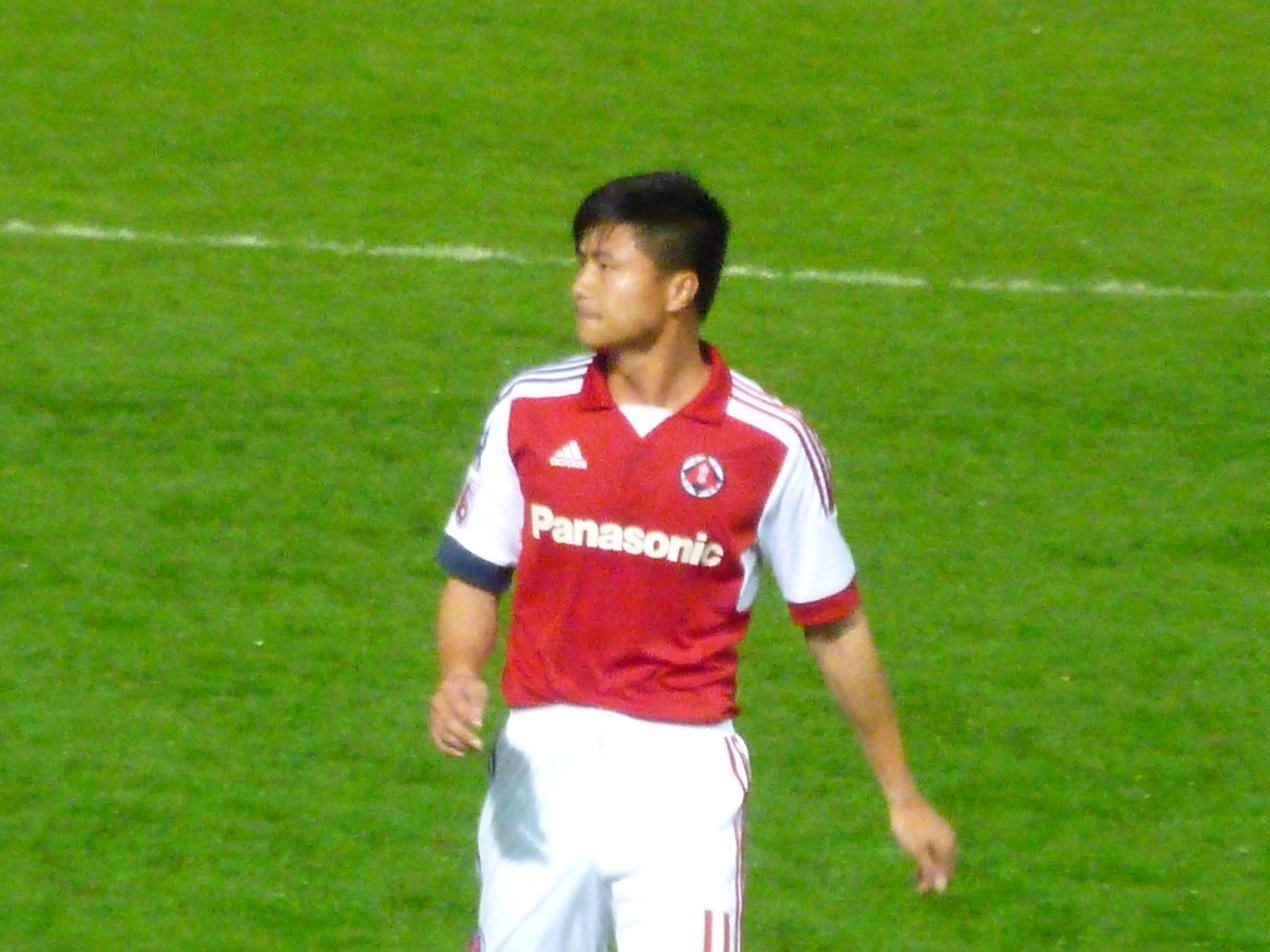
- Li in 2012

Personal information
- Date of birth: 3 May 1977 (age 49)
- Place of birth: Meixian, Guangdong, China
- Height: 1.81 m (5 ft 11 in)
- Position: Midfielder

Youth career
- Guangdong Hongyuan

Senior career*
Years	Team	Apps	(Gls)
1997–2002	Guangdong Hongyuan		
2002–2003	Qingdao Hailifeng	34	(6)
2003–2004	Dongguan Dongcheng	25	(4)
2004–2006	Chengdu Wuniu	4	(0)
2006–2012	South China	84	(12)
2012–2013	Tuen Mun	14	(1)
2013–2014	Eastern	14	(2)
2016	Shenzhen Baoxin		

International career
2008–2010	Hong Kong	6	(1)

Managerial career
- 2015: Shenzhen FC (caretaker)
- 2017: Meixian Techand
- 2019–2020: Shenzhen Bogang
- * Club domestic league appearances and goals

Li Haiqiang

Chinese name
- Traditional Chinese: 李海強
- Simplified Chinese: 李海强
Transcriptions
Standard Mandarin
- Hanyu Pinyin: Lǐ Hǎiqiáng
Yue: Cantonese
- Jyutping: Lei5 Hoi2koeng4

Vietnamese name
- Vietnamese: Lý Hải Cường

Li Haiqiang (simplified Chinese: 李海强; traditional Chinese: 李海強) is a former professional footballer. He played for various professional clubs in Hong Kong, as well as the national team as a midfielder and is nicknamed "The Golden Left Foot" because of his brilliant free kick skills. Born in China, he represented Hong Kong internationally.

== Club career ==
=== South China ===
==== 2006–07 season ====
He signed for South China in 2006. He was appointed as the captain in the second half of the season as the original captain Au Wai Lun served as a reserve player for most of the matches.

On 21 May 2007, Li Haiqiang was awarded the Hong Kong Footballer of the Year after scoring 6 goals in the 2006–07 season. It was his debut season in Hong Kong First Division League and he was the first Mainland player to receive this award in its 30-year history.

On Tuesday 24 July 2007, he played an integral part of South China's Barclays Asia Trophy 2007 tournament when he scored a terrific free-kick from approximately 40-yards out against Liverpool. The goal embarrassed Liverpool goalkeeper Scott Carson and recalled memories of Ronaldinho's World Cup 2002 goal against England. South China eventually lost the game by 3–1.

==== 2007–08 season ====
In the 2007–08 season, Li scored 4 goals, and all of them came from free kicks. Li Haiqiang was named Hong Kong Footballer of the Year at the end of the season for the second year in a row, as well as being named a member of the Best Eleven.

==== 2008–09 season ====
In the 2009 AFC Cup second-round match against Home United FC, Li Haiqiang scored two goals and helped South China win by 4:0 to progress to the quarter finals. On 1 August 2009, at the Panasonic Invitation Cup against Tottenham Hotspur, in the 68th minute, the referee pointed to the spot following a fairly innocuous challenge by Jake Livermore on Chao Pengfei and Li Haiqiang stepped up to chip the ball into the net, scoring the second goal which resulted in South China's 2–0 victory.

==== 2009–10 season ====
In the 2009 AFC Cup semi final second leg against Kuwait SC, Li Haiqiang received a back heel pass from Leandro Carrijo and scored in the 65th minute, but was ruled off-side, causing huge uproar from the capacity crowd in the Hong Kong Stadium. South China in the end lost the tie 1–3.

==== 2010–11 season ====
In January 2011, Li Haiqiang received praise from South China's new signing Mateja Kežman after their first training session together.

In the 2011 AFC Cup, Li Haiqiang scored the third goal for South China against East Bengal FC in the final minutes to lead the match 3:2, but the visitors were denied victory when East Bengal FC scored a late penalty and the match ended 3:3.

In the summer of 2011, Kitchee received permission from South China to approach Li about a transfer, but Li decided to stay with South China.

=== Tuen Mun ===
In the summer of 2012, Li joined Tuen Mun.

On 30 October 2012, due to the divestment of Tuen Mun president Chan Keung, various key players, including Li, and the whole coaching team were released by the club.

== International career ==
In 1999, Li was called up to the Chinese national football team's squad, but he did not play in any matches.

After spending two seasons in Hong Kong, Li qualified to play for Hong Kong national football team. On 19 November 2008, Li made his international debut for Hong Kong in a friendly match against Macau.

Li took part as captain in Round 2 of the 2010 East Asian Football Championship tournament, held in Kaohsiung, Taiwan, helping Hong Kong qualify for the final tournament for the first time since 2003, when North Korea withdrew.

On 4 October 2010, Li scored with a left-foot volley to help Hong Kong win a friendly by 1-0 against India.

In June 2011, just before the friendly against Malaysia, Li announced that he had resigned from the Hong Kong national football team in March, due to old age.

== Career statistics ==
=== Club ===
As of 11 June 2014

Club	Season	League		Senior Shield		League Cup		FA Cup		AFC Cup		Others^{1}		Total	
Club	Season	Apps	Goals	Apps	Goals	Apps	Goals	Apps	Goals	Apps	Goals	Apps	Goals	Apps	Goals
South China	2006–07	18	4	4	1	4	1	3	0	-	-	-	-	29	6
South China	2007–08	16	3	2	0	5	1	2	0	-	-	-	-	25	4
South China	2008–09	11	3	0	0	1	0	3	0	7	3	-	-	22	6
South China	2009–10	14	1	3	0	-	-	1	0	10	0	-	-	27	1
South China	2010–11	11	0	3	1	2	0	2	1	2	1	-	-	20	3
South China	2011–12	14	1	0	0	0	0	0	0	-	-	-	-	14	1
Tuen Mun	2012–13	14	1	2	0	-	-	2	0	-	-	2	0	20	1
Eastern	2013–14	14	2	3	0	-	-	1	0	-	-	0	0	18	2
Total		112	15	17	2	12	2	14	1	19	4	2	0	176	24

^{1} Others include 2012–13 Hong Kong season play-offs.

=== International ===
#	Date	Venue	Opponent	Home/Away	Result	Scored	Captain	Competition
1	19 November 2008	UST Stadium, Macau	Macau	A	9–1	0		Friendly
2	25 August 2009	World Games Stadium, Kaohsiung, Taiwan	North Korea	N	0–0	0	(c)	2010 East Asian Football Championship Semi-final
3	27 August 2009	World Games Stadium, Kaohsiung, Taiwan	Guam	N	12–0	0	(c)	2010 East Asian Football Championship Semi-final
4	18 November 2009	Hong Kong Stadium, Hong Kong	Japan	H	0–4	0		2011 AFC Asian Cup qualification
5	7 February 2010	Olympic Stadium, Tokyo, Japan	South Korea	N	0–5	0		2010 East Asian Football Championship
6	4 October 2010	Balewadi Stadium, Pune, India	India	A	1–0	1	(c)	Friendly

== Honours ==
South China

- Hong Kong First Division League: 2006–07, 2007–08, 2008–09, 2009–10
- Hong Kong Senior Shield: 2006–07, 2009–10

Individual

- Hong Kong Footballer of the Year: 2007, 2008
