= Neto (footballer, born 1982) =

Brazilian footballer

Personal information
- Full name: Apolônio Morais da Paixão Neto
- Date of birth: June 19, 1982 (age 44)
- Place of birth: Salvador, Bahia, Brazil
- Height: 1.82 m (6 ft 0 in)
- Position: Midfielder

Team information
- Current team: Brasil de Pelotas

Senior career*
Years	Team	Apps	(Gls)
2003–2006	Bahia		
2007	Gama		
2008	Uberaba		
2008	Gama		
2009	Treze		
2009–2010	Shatin		
2011	Veranópolis		
2011–	Brasil de Pelotas		
- * Club domestic league appearances and goals

Apolônio Morais da Paixão Neto (born 19 June 1982 in Salvador, Bahia), known as just Neto, is a Brazilian footballer who plays for Brasil de Pelotas.

He has the same given name along with his grandfather, thus has a suffix Neto (means grandson) in his name.
