= Lau Wai Hon =

Hong Kongese footballer

Lau Wai Hon 劉偉翰
Personal information
- Full name: Bryan Lau Wai Hon
- Date of birth: 23 June 2005 (age 21)
- Place of birth: New York City, United States
- Height: 1.92 m (6 ft 4 in)
- Position: Goalkeeper

Team information
- Current team: Sha Tin
- Number: 39

Youth career
- 2017–2019: Blau Weiss Gottschee
- 2019–2020: New York Cosmos
- 2020: New Amsterdam
- 2021–2023: Brooke House

Senior career*
| Years | Team | Apps | (Gls) |
| 2023–2024 | NK Sesvete | 2 | (0) |
| 2025 | Staten Island Athletic | 2 | (0) |
| 2025–2026 | HKFC | 3 | (0) |
| 2026– | Sha Tin | 4 | (0) |
- * Club domestic league appearances and goals ‡ National team caps and goals as of 16:11, 22 November 2026 (UTC)

Bryan Lau Wai Hon (Chinese: 劉偉翰; born 23 June 2005) is a Hong Kong professional footballer who currently plays as a goalkeeper for Hong Kong Premier League club Sha Tin.

== Club career ==
In 2023, Lau joined Croatian 1. NL club NK Sesvete. He made two league appearances for the club that season. He then moved to USL League Two club Staten Island Athletic in the United States, making two appearances for the club during the 2025 season.

Following his departure from Staten Island, Lau joined Hong Kong Premier League club HKFC. The following season, he moved to Sha Tin of the same league. He was expected to initially feature prominently for the club's under-22 side.

== International career ==
Lau is American-born Chinese. Lau was called up to the Hong Kong national under-19 team in summer 2023 for a training camp ahead of the 2023 East Asian Youth Games. He was then called up to the Hong Kong national under-20 team for a training camp in July 2024 in preparation for 2025 AFC U-20 Asian Cup qualification the following September.
