= Sha Tin Sports Ground =

Sports ground in Sha Tin, Hong Kong

Coordinates: 22°23′14″N 114°11′49″E

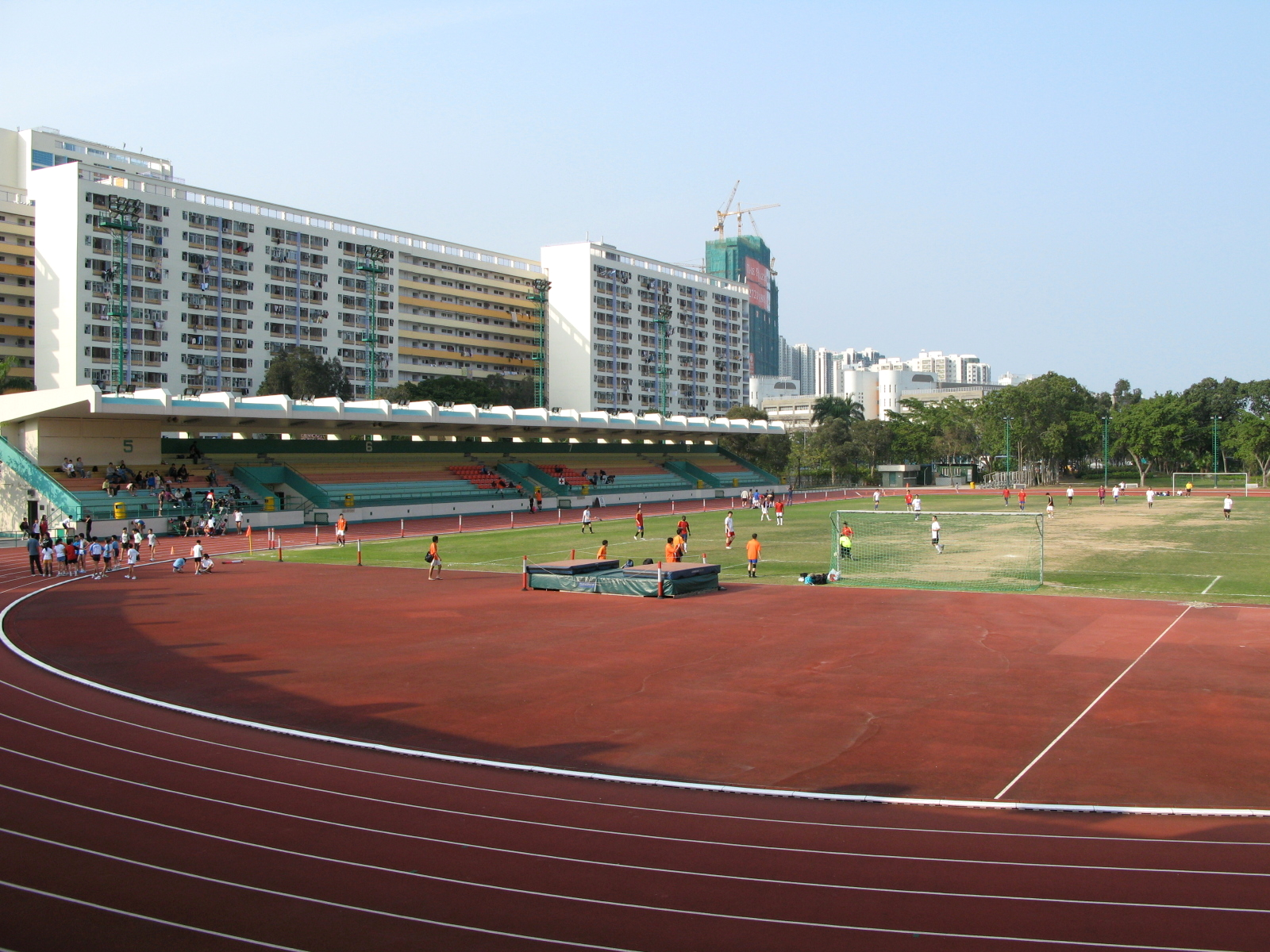
- Sha Tin Sports Ground in March 2008
- Interactive map of Sha Tin Sports Ground
- Location: 18 Yuen Wo Road, Sha Tin, Hong Kong
- Owner: Hong Kong Government
- Capacity: 2,540
- Surface: Grass
- Pitch size: 100 x 65 metres (110 x 71 yards)

Construction
- Groundbreaking: 1983; 43 years ago
- Opened: January 1984; 42 years ago
- Renovated: 2024

Tenant
- Sha Tin

Sha Tin Sports Ground is a multi-use stadium at 18 Yuen Wo Road, Sha Tin, Hong Kong. It is adjacent to the Shing Mun River. It is the home stadium for Hong Kong Premier League club Sha Tin. The stadium holds 2,540.

== Facilities ==
- Two covered grandstands
- Natural grass football pitch
- 400 m running track
- Clock (unused)
- Two refreshment kiosks (one is unused)

== Hong Kong Premier League ==
After successfully promoted to the 2026–27 Hong Kong Premier League, Sha Tin played their home league matches at Sha Tin Sports Ground.

== Gallery ==
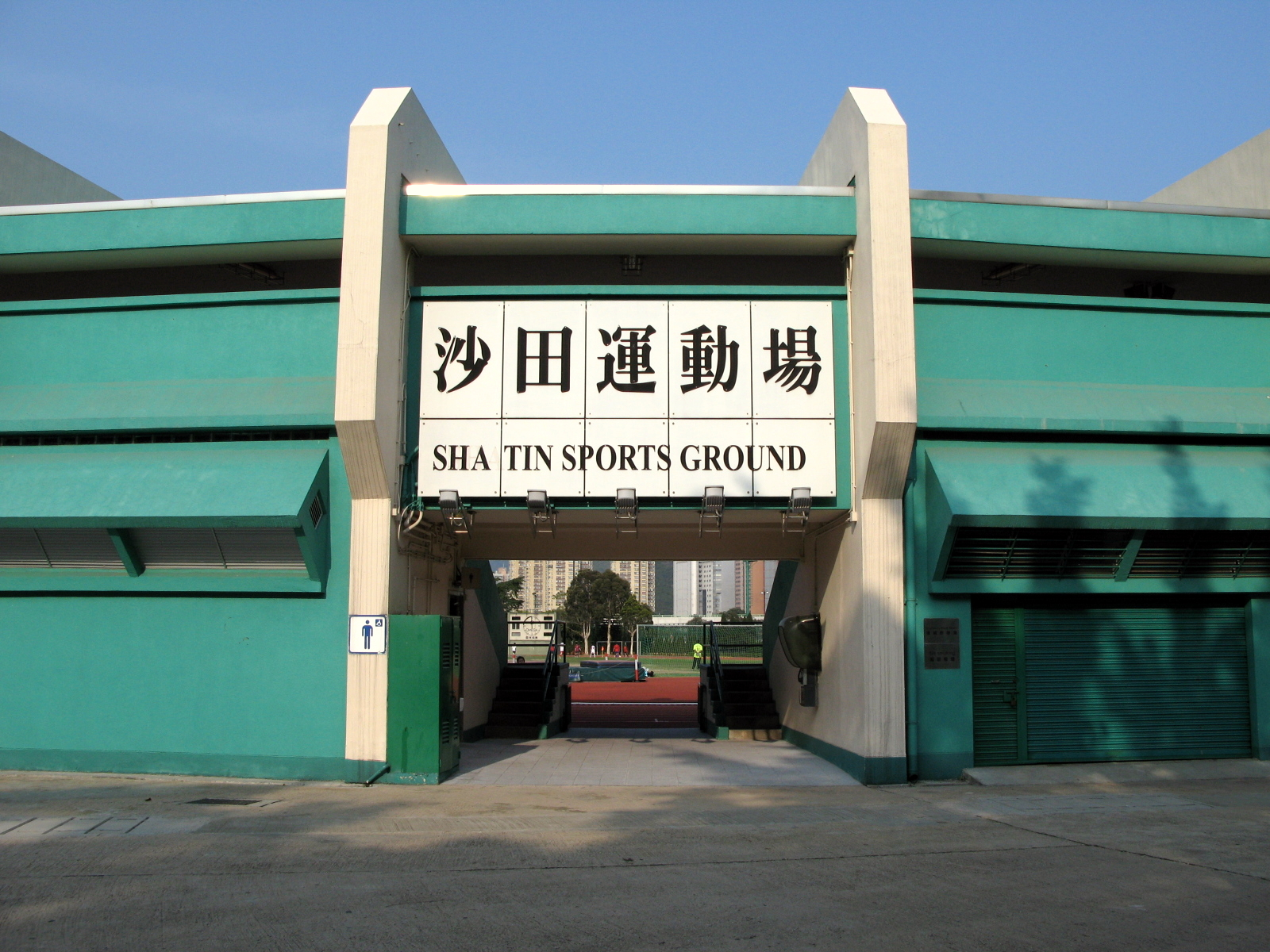
The entrance of the sports ground in March 2008

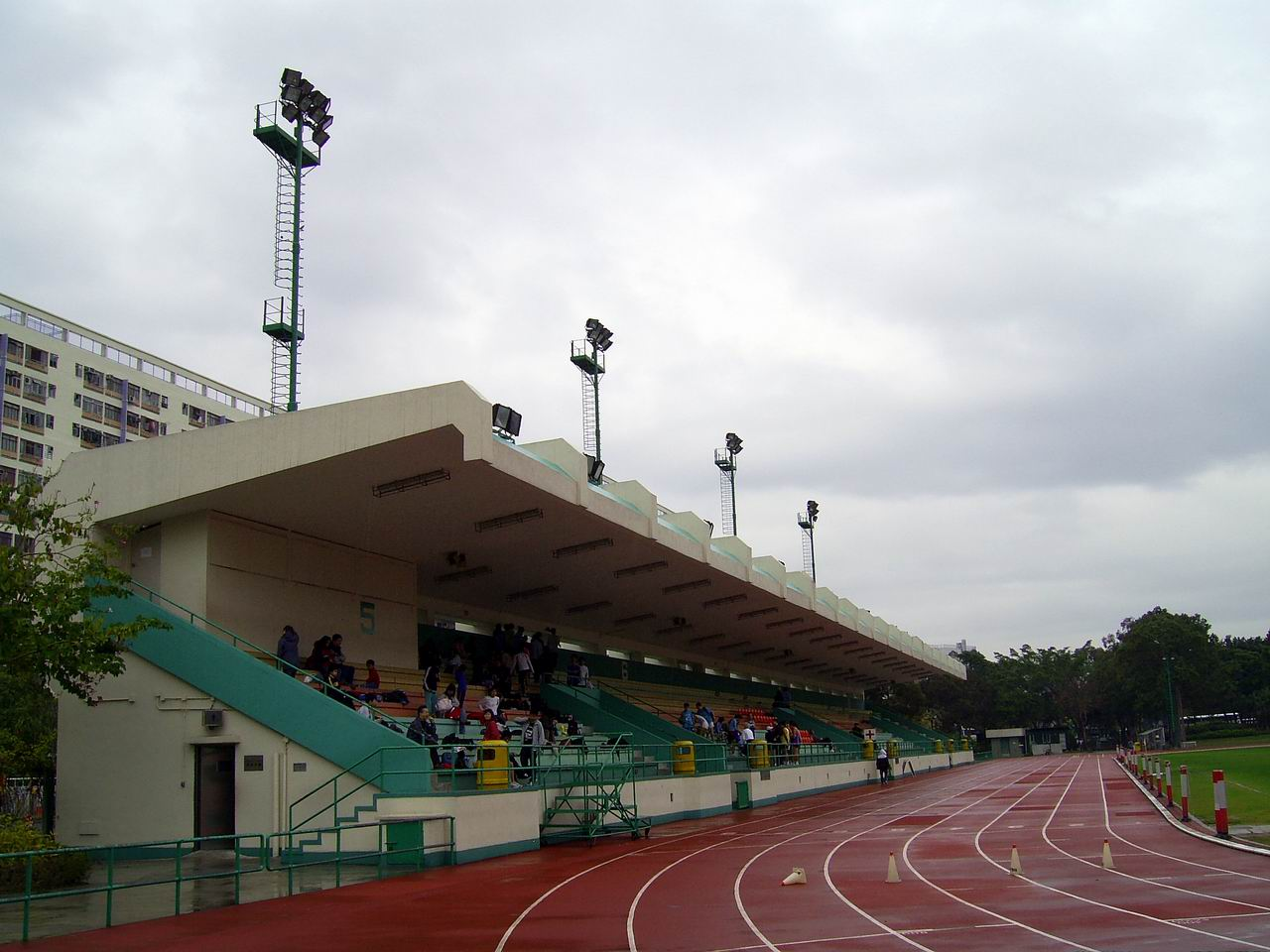
Main grandstand in February 2008

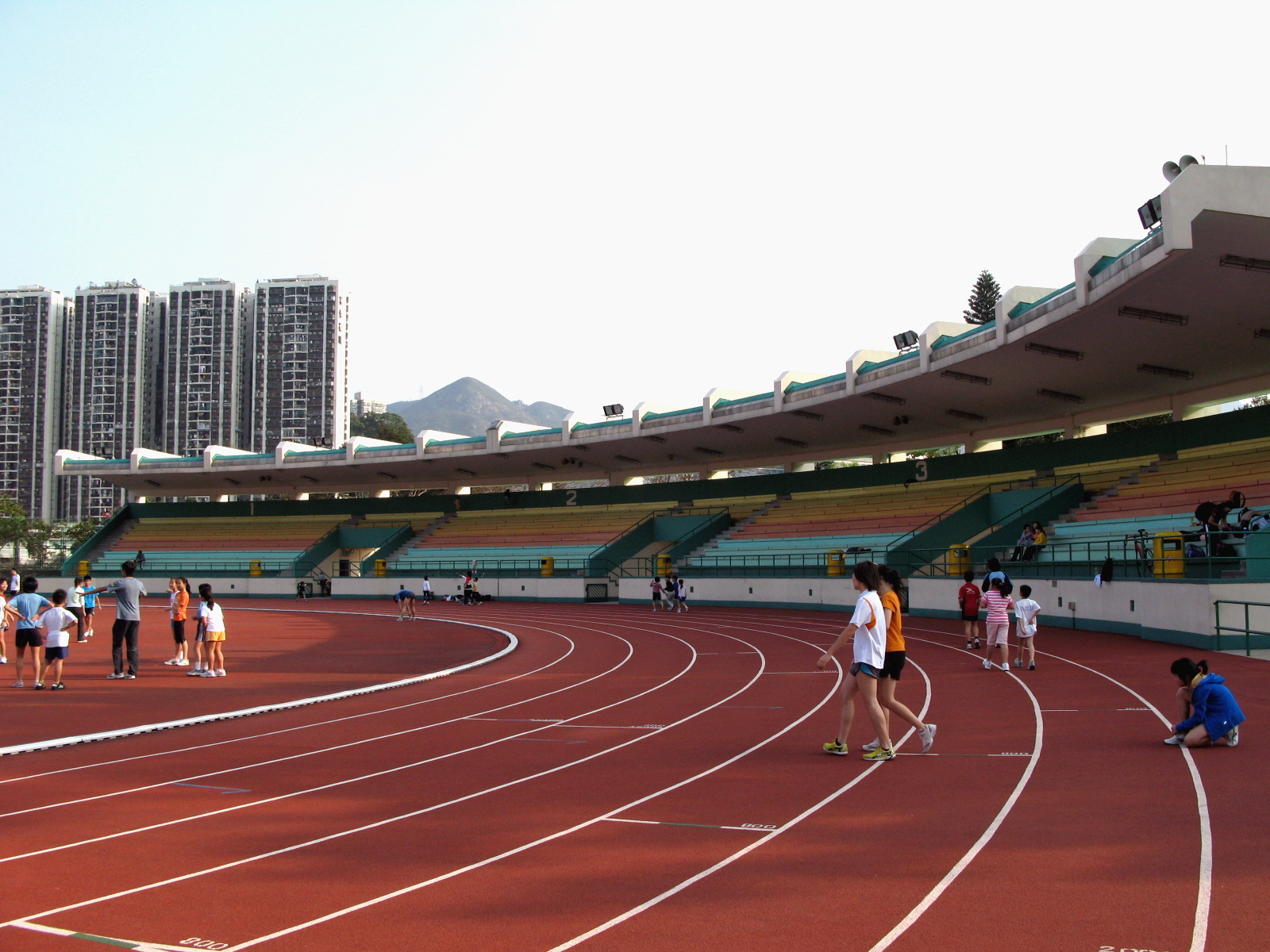
Secondary grandstand in March 2008

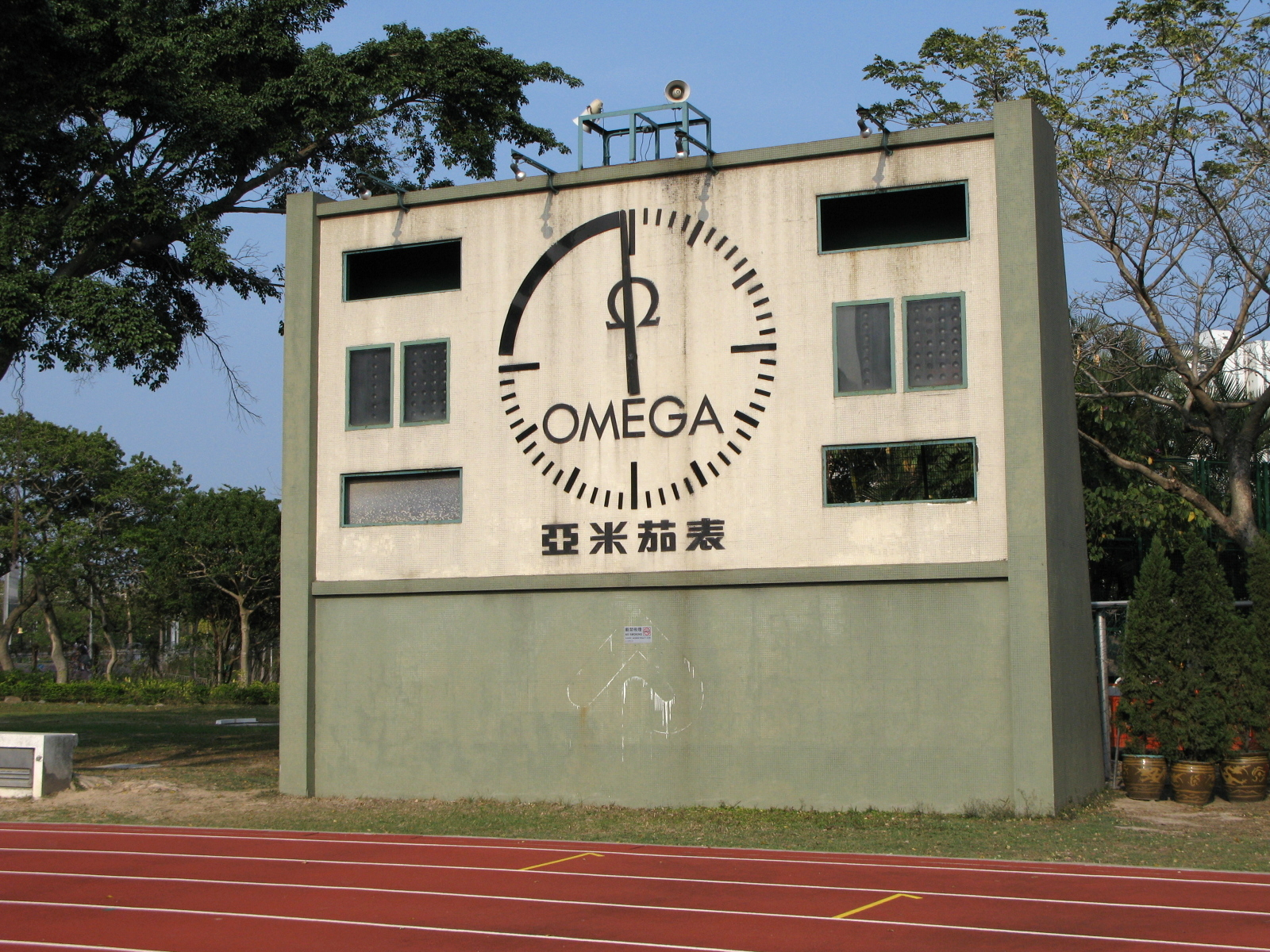
The unused clock in March 2008

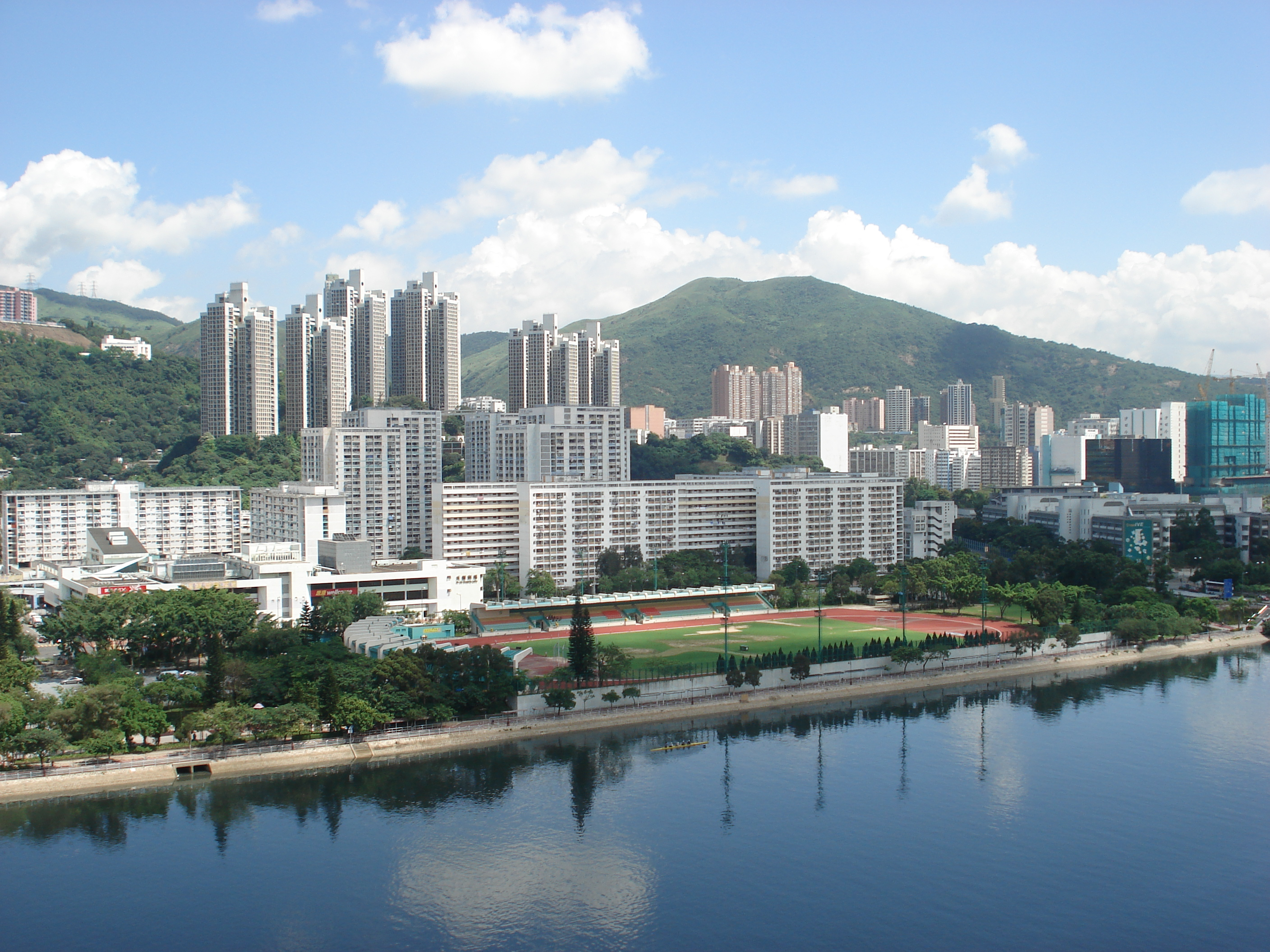
View of sports ground with Shing Mun River in July 2007
