= Lee Hong Lim =

Hong Kong footballer (born 1983)

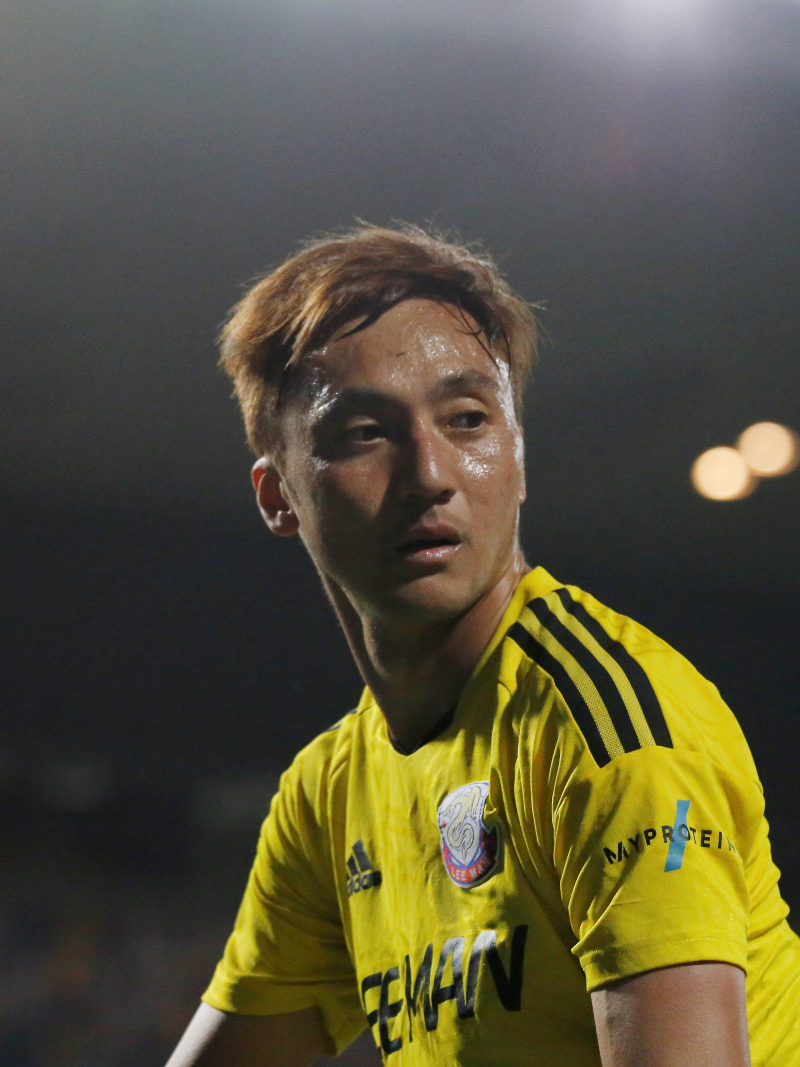
- Lee in 2023

Personal information
- Full name: Lee Hong Lim
- Date of birth: 29 September 1983 (age 43)
- Place of birth: North District, Hong Kong
- Height: 1.78 m (5 ft 10 in)
- Position: Left winger

Senior career*
Years	Team	Apps	(Gls)
2003–2009	Tai Po	64	(18)
2009–2012	Pegasus	62	(13)
2012–2014	South China	34	(8)
2014–2015	Pegasus	9	(0)
2015–2019	Eastern	55	(11)
2019–2023	Lee Man	31	(5)
2023–2025	Central & Western	46	(7)
2025–	Hoi King	25	(3)

International career
2009–2017	Hong Kong	33	(4)
- * Club domestic league appearances and goals

Lee Hong Lim (Chinese: 李康廉; Jyutping: lei^{5} hong^{1} lim^{4}, born 29 September 1983) is a former Hong Kong professional footballer who played as a left winger.

He is the brother of former professional footballer Lee Wai Lim.

== Early age ==
Lee and his brother, Lee Wai Lim grew up in Sha Tau Kok. They were discovered and recruited by Chan Ping, the team manager of Tai Po, who was impressed by the brothers in a street match.

== Club career ==
=== Tai Po ===
Tai Po was in the Third Division when the brothers joined the team. The team were promoted to the Second Division League and the two brothers were crucial members of the promoted team, for which Lee scored 12 goals in 22 games. The team finished at the second spot in the 2005–06 season and secured promotion to the First Division League. Lee decided to quit his full-time job and became a full-time professional football player. He wore no. 7 shirt in 2006–07 season and had 2 goals in 21 games. Tai Po finished at the 7th spot in their debut season in the First Division League.

=== Pegasus ===
Lee moved to Pegasus in the January 2009 transfer window. He has since scored an important goal in the League Cup semifinal against South China which ended 2–1 in Pegasus' favour.

=== South China ===
On 9 July 2012, South China chairman Steven Lo announced that they have signed Lee for the 2012–13 season. He made his debut for South China on 2 September 2012 at Hong Kong Stadium, having scored a long-range goal to help the team win against Yokohama FC Hong Kong 5–2.

=== Pegasus ===
In July 2014, Lee returned to Pegasus.

=== Eastern ===
On 30 June 2015, Lee signed for Eastern.

=== Lee Man ===
On 19 July 2019, Lee Man announced the signing of Lee at their season-opening media event.

In April 2023, Lee announced his retirement from professional football.

== International career ==
At the 2011 Long Teng Cup, in the final match against Chinese Taipei, Lee scored two goals and helped Hong Kong win the match 6–0 and retain the trophy.

== Career statistics ==
=== Club ===
Appearances and goals by club, season and competition
Club	Season	League			Senior Shield		FA Cup		League Cup		AFC Cup		Total	
Club	Season	Division	Apps	Goals	Apps	Goals	Apps	Goals	Apps	Goals	Apps	Goals	Apps	Goals
Tai Po	2005–06	Hong Kong Second Division League	21	12	4 (Note: Since Tai Po was in the Second Division in the 2005–06 season, they could only participate in Junior Challenge Shield but not Senior Challenge Shield.)	1	0	0	0	0			25	13
Tai Po	2006–07	Hong Kong First Division League	15	2	1	0	1	0	4	0			21	2
Tai Po	2007–08	Hong Kong First Division League	15	1	1	0	3	0	4	0			23	1
Tai Po	2008–09	Hong Kong First Division League	13	3	1	0	0	0	0	0			14	3
Tai Po	Total		64	18	7	1	4	0	8	0	0	0	83	19
Pegasus	2008–09	Hong Kong First Division League	10	3	0	0	4	2	4	1			18	6
Pegasus	2009–10	Hong Kong First Division League	19	4	2	2	3	1					24	7
Pegasus	2010–11	Hong Kong First Division League	16	4	1	0	2	1	3	1	6	1	28	7
Pegasus	2011–12	Hong Kong First Division League	18	2	6	1	3	0	3	2			30	5
Pegasus	Total		63	13	9	3	12	4	10	4	6	1	100	25
South China	2012–13	Hong Kong First Division League	16	6	4	0	4	1	–				24	7
South China	2013–14	Hong Kong First Division League	0	0	0	0	0	0	–		0	0	0	0
South China	Total		16	6	4	0	4	1	0	0	0	0	24	7
Career total			143	37	20	4	20	5	18	4	6	1	207	51

=== International ===
Appearances and goals by national team and year
National team	Year	Apps	Goals
Hong Kong	2009	2	0
Hong Kong	2010	3	0
Hong Kong	2011	6	2
Hong Kong	2012	10	2
Hong Kong	2013	6	0
Hong Kong	2014	1	0
Hong Kong	2015	0	0
Hong Kong	2016	4	0
Hong Kong	2017	1	0
Total		33	4

Scores and results list Hong Kong's goal tally first, score column indicates score after each Lee goal.

List of international goals scored by Lee Hong Lim
No.	Date	Venue	Opponent	Score	Result	Competition	Ref.
1	4 October 2011	Kaohsiung National Stadium, Kaohsiung, Taiwan	Chinese Taipei		6–0	2011 Long Teng Cup	
2	4 October 2011	Kaohsiung National Stadium, Kaohsiung, Taiwan	Chinese Taipei		6–0	2011 Long Teng Cup	
3	29 February 2012	Mong Kok Stadium, Hong Kong	Chinese Taipei		5–1	Friendly	
4	7 December 2012	Hong Kong Stadium, So Kon Po, Hong Kong	Chinese Taipei		2–0	2013 EAFF East Asian Cup Preliminary Competition Round 2	

== Honours ==
Pegasus

- Hong Kong FA Cup: 2009–10

South China

- Hong Kong First Division: 2012–13
- Hong Kong Senior Shield: 2013–14

Eastern

- Hong Kong Premier League: 2015–16
- Hong Kong Senior Shield: 2015–16
