= Takashi Fujii (footballer) =

Japanese footballer

Personal information
- Full name: Takashi Fujii
- Date of birth: 28 April 1986 (age 40)
- Place of birth: Taketoyo, Aichi, Japan
- Height: 1.75 m (5 ft 9 in)
- Position: Forward

Youth career
- 2002–2004: Júbilo Iwata

Senior career*
Years	Team	Apps	(Gls)
2005–2008	Júbilo Iwata	4	(0)
2007	→Ehime FC (loan)	26	(0)
2009	Shizuoka FC		
2010	Shatin	1	(0)
2010	Sun Hei	6	(1)
2010	Unsommet Iwate Hachimantai		
2011–2013	AC Nagano Parceiro	75	(9)
2014	Blaublitz Akita	23	(3)
2015	FC Ryukyu	28	(2)
Total		163	(15)
- * Club domestic league appearances and goals

Takashi Fujii (藤井 貴, Fujii Takashi; born 28 April 1986) is a former Japanese professional footballer who played as a forward. Fujii previously played for Júbilo Iwata and Ehime FC

== Club statistics ==
Club performance			League		Cup		League Cup		Continental		Total	
Season	Club	League	Apps	Goals	Apps	Goals	Apps	Goals	Apps	Goals	Apps	Goals
Japan			League		Emperor's Cup		J.League Cup		Asia		Total	
2005	Júbilo Iwata	J1 League	0	0	2	0	0	0	1	0	3	0
2006	Júbilo Iwata	J1 League	2	0	0	0	0	0	-		2	0
2007	Ehime FC	J2 League	26	0	0	0	-		-		26	0
2008	Júbilo Iwata	J1 League	0	0	1	0	1	0	-		2	0
Country	Japan		28	0	3	0	1	0	1	0	33	0
Total			28	0	3	0	1	0	1	0	33	0
