= Wong Chi Tang =

Hong Kong football referee

Charlton Wong Chi Tang
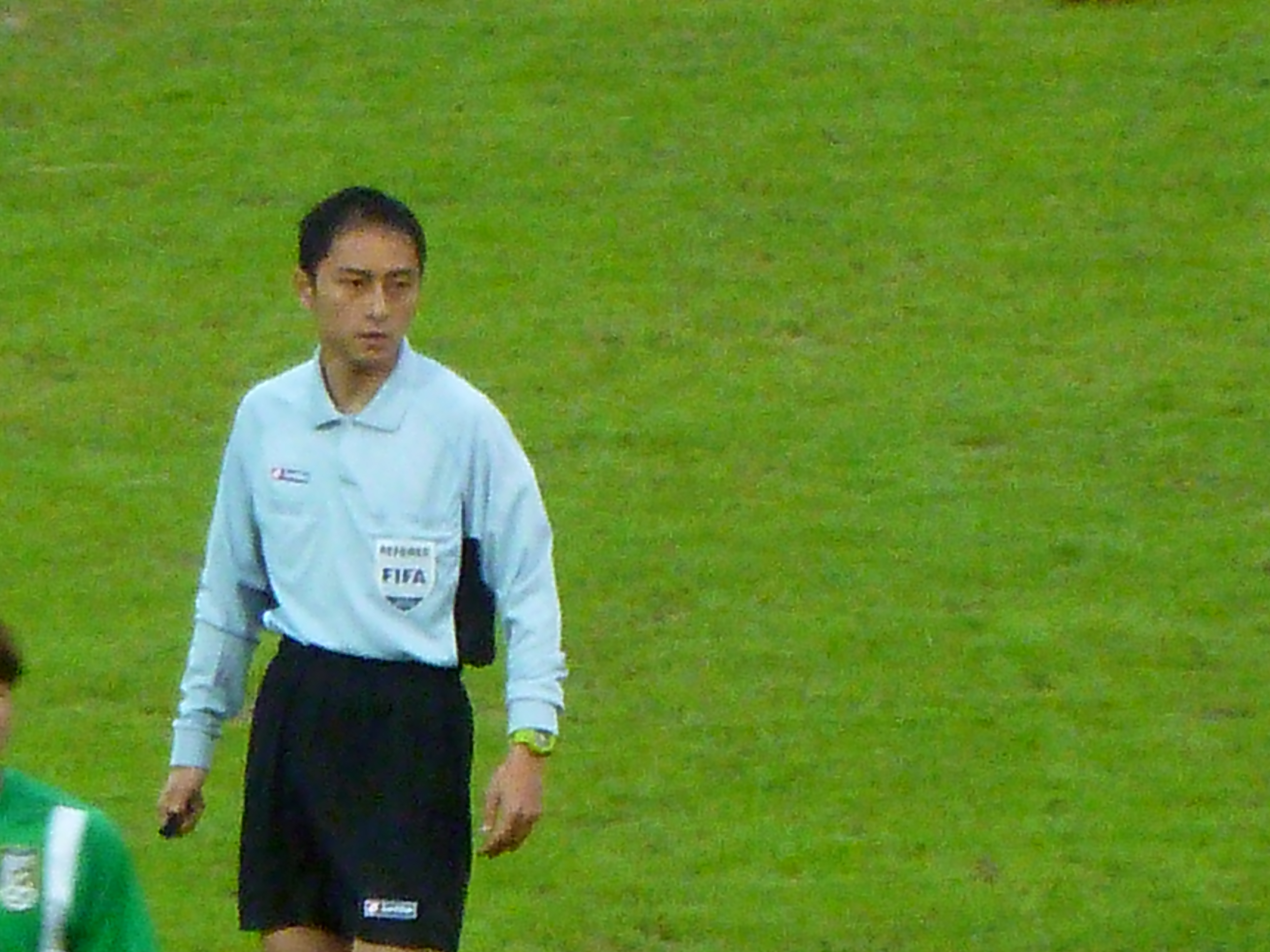
- Full name: Charlton Wong Chi Tang
- Born: 23 November 1979 (age 46); Hong Kong
- Other occupation: Teacher
Years		Role
–2012		Referee

International
Years	League	Role
2006–2010	FIFA listed	Referee

Wong Chi Tang
- Traditional Chinese: 黃志騰
- Simplified Chinese: 黄志腾
Transcriptions
Standard Mandarin
- Hanyu Pinyin: Huáng Zhìténg
- IPA: [xwǎŋ ʈʂɻ̩̂ tʰə̌ŋ]
Yue: Cantonese
- Jyutping: Wong4 Zi3tang4
- IPA: [wɔŋ˩ tsi˧ tʰɐŋ˩]

Charlton Wong Chi Tang (Chinese: 黃志騰; Jyutping: Wong4 Zi3tang4; Cantonese pronunciation: [wɔŋ˩ tsi˧ tʰɐŋ˩]; born 23 November 1979) is a former football referee. He officiated in the Hong Kong First Division League.

He is now the discipline master and a math teacher of STFA Seaward Woo College

== Career ==
=== Hong Kong First Division League matches ===
- 2007–08: 9 matches
- 2008–09: 13 matches
- 2009–10: 15 matches
