= Márcio Martins =

Brazilian footballer

Personal information
- Full name: Márcio Fábio Martins
- Date of birth: April 30, 1980 (age 46)
- Place of birth: Ibitinga, Brazil
- Height: 1.83 m (6 ft 0 in)
- Positions: Centre-back; defensive midfielder

Team information
- Current team: TSW Pegasus
- Number: 2

Senior career*
Years	Team	Apps	(Gls)
2000	Matonense	?	(?)
2001–2002	Guaratinguetá	?	(?)
2003–2005	Figueirense	25	(3)
2006	Guarani	10	(1)
2007	Juventus	?	(?)
2007–2009	Vitória Guimarães	2	(0)
2009	Ceará	?	(?)
2009	Goytacaz	?	(?)
2009–	TSW Pegasus	3	(1)
- * Club domestic league appearances and goals as of 11 September 2009

Márcio Fábio Martins (born 30 April 1980) is a Brazilian football player who is now playing in TSW Pegasus. He plays as a centre-back and defensive midfielder. He joined the team on 10 September 2009.

== Career ==
Under manager Luiz Carlos Ferreira, Márcio Martins made his debut in Campeonato Brasileiro Serie A with Figueirense during December 2003.

== Career Statistics in Hong Kong ==
As of 11 September 2009

Club	Season	League		Senior Shield		League Cup		FA Cup		AFC Cup		Total	
Club	Season	Apps	Goals	Apps	Goals	Apps	Goals	Apps	Goals	Apps	Goals	Apps	Goals
TSW Pegasus	2009-10	3 (0)	1	0 (0)	0	0 (0)	0	0 (0)	0	N/A	N/A	3 (0)	1
TSW Pegasus	All	3 (0)	1	0 (0)	0	0 (0)	0	0 (0)	0	N/A	N/A	3 (0)	1
