= Cahê =

Brazilian footballer (born 1982)

Personal information
- Full name: Carlos Henrique Manzato dos Santos
- Date of birth: August 20, 1982 (age 44)
- Place of birth: Santo André (SP), Brazil
- Height: 1.85 m (6 ft 1 in)
- Position: Forward

Senior career*
Years	Team	Apps	(Gls)
2009–2011	Sun Hei	36	(26)
- * Club domestic league appearances and goals as of 1 June 2012

Carlos Henrique Manzato dos Santos (Chinese: 卡爾, born 20 August 1982), commonly known as Cahê, is a Brazilian football forward who currently formerly plays for Hong Kong First Division League football club Sun Hei SC in 2009 to 2011.

== Honours ==
=== Individual ===
- Hong Kong First Division League top scorer: 2009–10

Awards and achievements
Preceded by Giovane; Detinho	Hong Kong First Division League top scorer 2009–10	Succeeded by Makhosonke Bhengu; Jordi Tarrés
