= Sthembiso Ntombela =

South African soccer player

Personal information
- Full name: Sthembiso Nkanyiso Sboniso Ntombela
- Date of birth: 21 March 1982 (age 44)
- Place of birth: South Africa
- Height: 1.85 m (6 ft 1 in)
- Position: Defender

Senior career*
| Years | Team | Apps | (Gls) |
| 2009–2010 | Hong Kong Rangers | 10 | (1) |
| 2011–2012 | PSAP Sigli | 26 | (0) |
- * Club domestic league appearances and goals as of 19:20, 11 July 2012 (UTC)

Sthembiso Nkanyiso Sboniso Ntombela or Sthembiso Ntombela (born 21 March 1982) is a South African former soccer player who plays as a defender.
