= Wong Yiu Fu =

Hong Kong footballer and coach

Wong Yiu Fu 黃耀富
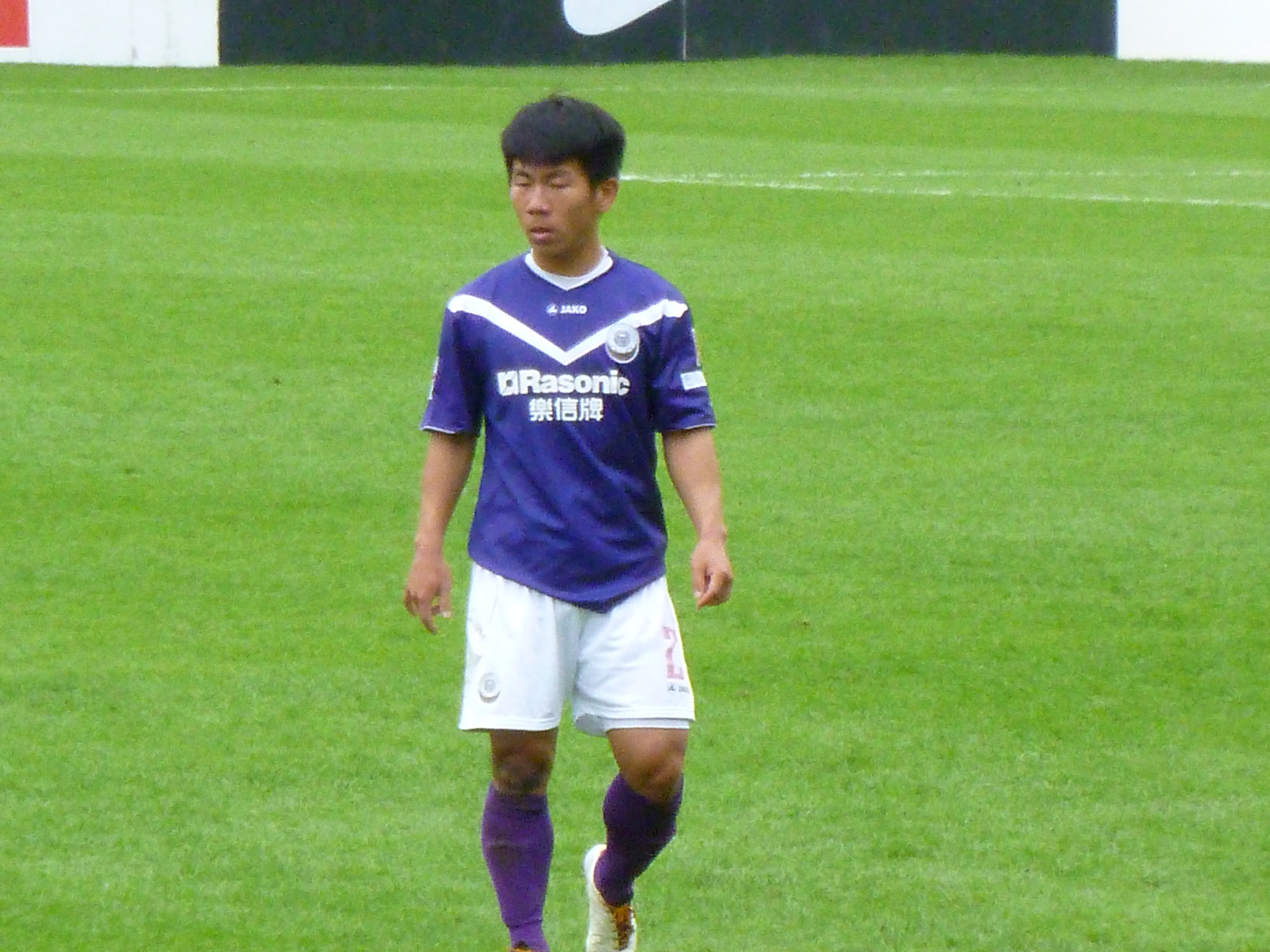

Personal information
- Full name: Wong Yiu Fu
- Date of birth: 6 August 1981 (age 45)
- Place of birth: Hong Kong
- Height: 1.65 m (5 ft 5 in)
- Positions: Left back; left winger

Team information
- Current team: Tai Po (assistant coach)

Youth career
- 1995–1997: HKSI

Senior career*
Years	Team	Apps	(Gls)
1997–1998	Happy Valley		
1998–1999	Rangers (HKG)		
1999–2000	Sun Hei		
2000–2001	Rangers (HKG)		
2001–2007	HKFC	23	(2)
2007–2009	Eastern	32	(0)
2009–2014	Citizen	57	(2)
2014–2015	Rangers (HKG)	2	(1)
2015	Yuen Long	3	(0)
2016–2017	Tai Po	15	(0)
2017–2018	Dreams FC	0	(0)
2018–2019	Hoi King	5	(0)
2019–2021	Sham Shui Po	5	(1)
2021–2023	Happy Valley	28	(1)

International career
1998–2007	Hong Kong U23		
2012–2019	Hong Kong (futsal)		

Managerial career
- 2026–: Tai Po (assistant coach)
- * Club domestic league appearances and goals

Wong Yiu Fu (Chinese: 黃耀富; Jyutping: wong^{4} jiu^{6} fu^{3}; born 6 August 1981) is a former Hong Kong professional footballer who played as a left back. He is currently the assistant coach of Hong Kong Premier League club Tai Po.

== Personal life ==
On 22 May 2018, Wong married his girlfriend Winnie after 16 years.

== Honours ==
=== Club ===
Eastern

- Hong Kong Senior Shield: 2007–08

Citizen

- Hong Kong Senior Shield: 2010–11

Tai Po

- Hong Kong Sapling Cup: 2016–17
