= So Loi Keung =

Hong Kong former footballer (born 1982)

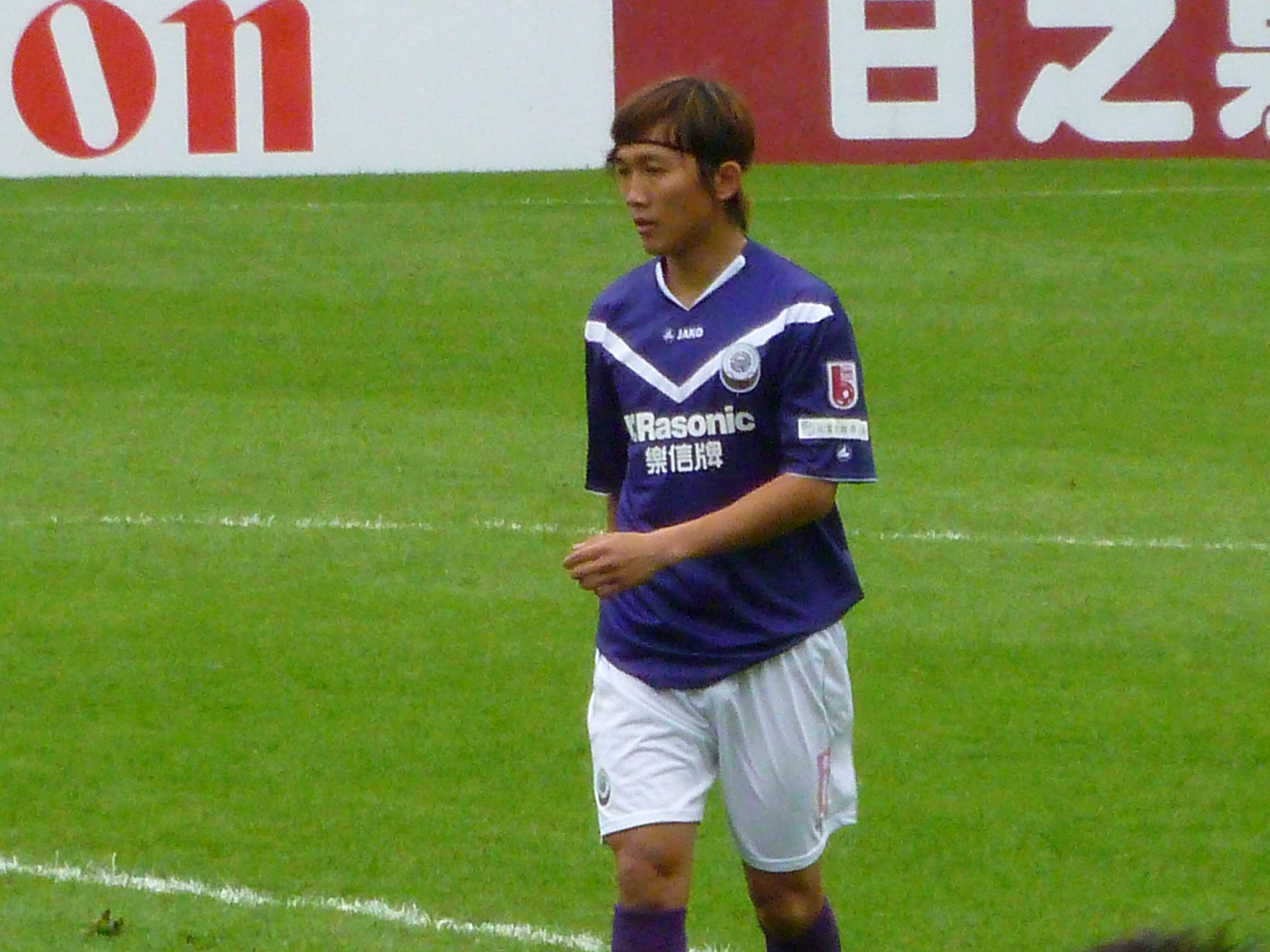
- So playing for Citizen in 2012

Personal information
- Full name: So Loi Keung
- Date of birth: 27 October 1982 (age 44)
- Place of birth: Aberdeen, Hong Kong
- Height: 1.68 m (5 ft 6 in)
- Position: Midfielder

Senior career*
Years	Team	Apps	(Gls)
2002–2005	Fukien	35	(1)
2005–2006	Hong Kong Rangers	7	(0)
2007–2010	Tai Po	73	(13)
2010–2011	Kitchee	12	(3)
2011–2014	Citizen	44	(0)
2014–2015	Yuen Long	13	(0)
2015–2016	Sun Hei	26	(6)
2016–2018	Wong Tai Sin	50	(6)
2018–2019	Central & Western	22	(5)
2019–2020	King Fung	10	(1)
2020	Tai Po	1	(0)
2021–2022	Wong Tai Sin	21	(3)
2026–	Double Flower		

International career
2002–2004	Hong Kong U23	6	(0)
2010–2011	Hong Kong	3	(0)

Managerial career
- 2019–2020: King Fung (player-coach)
- 2020: Tai Po (player-coach)
- * Club domestic league appearances and goals as of 16 May 2026

So Loi Keung (Chinese: 蘇來強; Jyutping: sou^{1} loi^{4} koeng^{4}; born 27 October 1982) is a Hong Kong former professional footballer who played as a midfielder.

== Club career ==
So previously played for Fukien, Rangers and Tai Po.

=== Tai Po ===
During his Tai Po career, So helped the team beat Pegasus 4-2 to win the 2008–09 Hong Kong FA Cup, thus Tai Po earned the right to play in the 2010 AFC Cup.

=== Kitchee ===
On 26 May 2010, Kitchee announced that So had joined the team for the 2010–11 Hong Kong First Division League. He wore no. 8 at Kitchee and scored 3 goals for the club.

=== Citizen ===
On 16 June 2011, Citizen announced that they had signed So for the 2011–12 Hong Kong First Division League season and the 2012 AFC Cup. He cited a lack of playing time at Kitchee as the reason for the move. He hopes to share his AFC Cup experience with the team. He will continue to wear the No. 8 shirt at his new club.

So is reunited with former teammate Chiu Chun Kit at Citizen and both have been recruited to be coaches at the Hong Kong Arsenal Soccer School.

== International career ==
So was selected to represent Hong Kong in the 2011 AFC Asian Cup qualification match away to Bahrain. Hong Kong lost 4‐0. He started and finished the match. On 16 June 2011, So was named as one of the 25-men Hong Kong squad to face Saudi Arabia in the 2014 FIFA World Cup Asian qualification match. On 30 September 2011, So was sent off in the 3-3 draw with the Philippines in the 2011 Long Teng Cup.

== Career statistics ==
=== International ===
#	Date	Venue	Opponent	Result	Goals	Competition
1	6 January 2010	National Stadium, Madinat 'Isa, Bahrain	Bahrain	0–4	0	2011 AFC Asian Cup qualification
2	30 September 2011	Kaohsiung National Stadium, Kaohsiung, Taiwan	Philippines	3–3	0	2011 Long Teng Cup
3	4 October 2011	Kaohsiung National Stadium, Kaohsiung, Taiwan	Chinese Taipei	6–0	0	2011 Long Teng Cup
