= Liu Kwok Man =

Hong Kong football referee

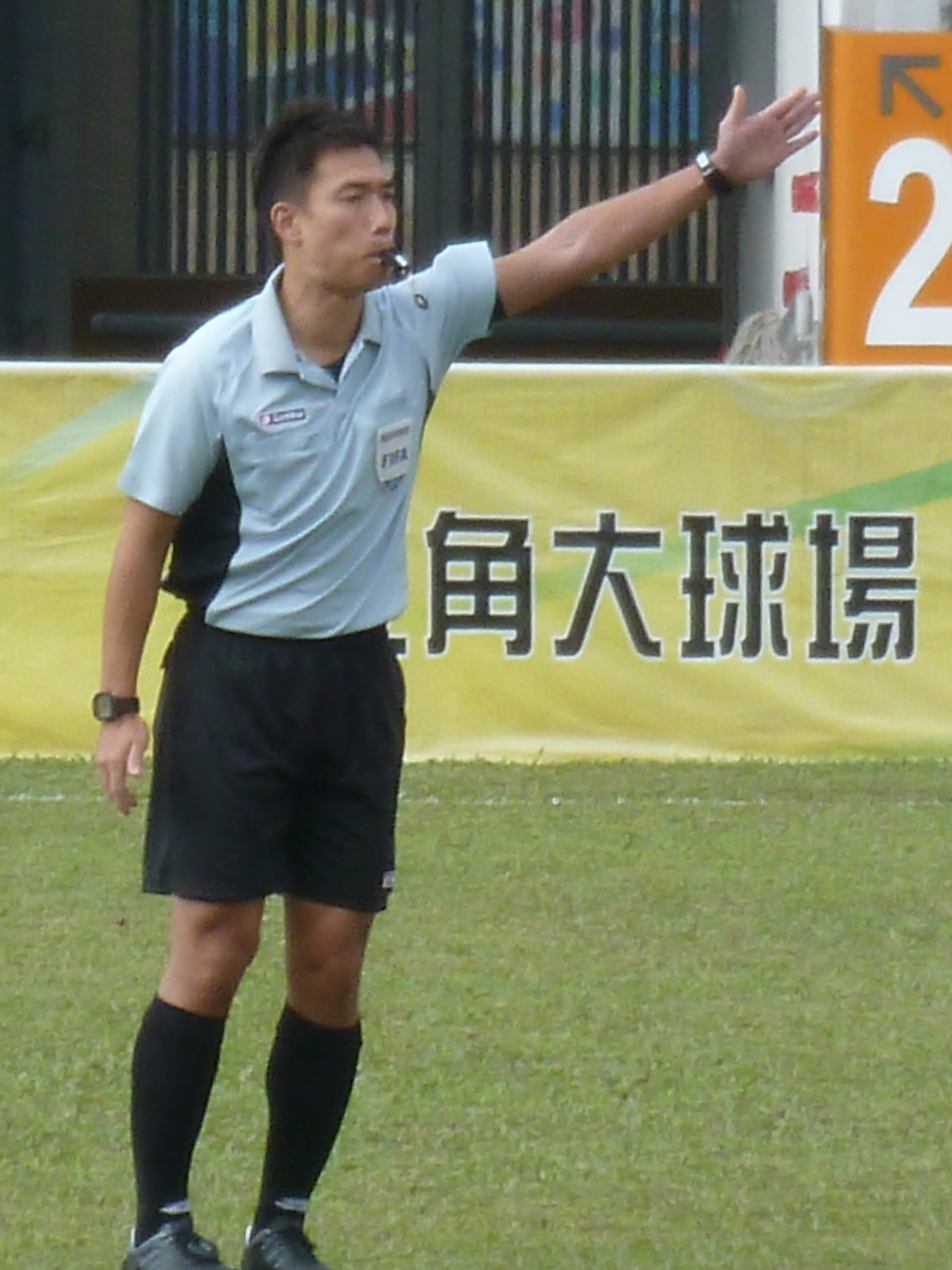
- Full name: Liu Kwok Man
- Born: 1 July 1978 (age 48); British Hong Kong

Domestic
Years	League	Role
2006–2014	Hong Kong First Division League	Referee
2014–	Hong Kong Premier League	Referee

International
Years	League	Role
2008–	FIFA listed	Referee
2008–	AFC	Referee

Liu Kwok Man
- Traditional Chinese: 廖國文
- Simplified Chinese: 廖国文
Transcriptions
Standard Mandarin
- Hanyu Pinyin: Liào Guówén
- IPA: [ljâʊ kwǒ wə̌n]
Yue: Cantonese
- Jyutping: Liu6 Gwok3man4
- IPA: [liw˨ kʷɔk̚˧ mɐn˩]

Liu Kwok Man (born 1 July 1978) is a football referee from Hong Kong who has been a full international referee for FIFA.

He also refereed at the regional league such as 2014 FIFA World Cup qualifiers. Sponsor Thai Premier League the big match Chonburi vs SCG Muangthong United, AFC Champions League, AFC Cup and 2012 AFC U-19 Championship.

== AFC Asian Cup ==
2019 AFC Asian Cup – United Arab Emirates
Date	Match	Venue	Round
6 January 2019	Thailand – India	Abu Dhabi	Group stage
