= Baruc Nsue =

Equatoguinean footballer (born 1984)

Personal information
- Full name: Baruc Nsue Burcet
- Date of birth: 2 November 1984 (age 41)
- Place of birth: Tona, Spain
- Height: 1.77 m (5 ft 10 in)
- Positions: Attacking midfielder; left midfielder

Senior career*
Years	Team	Apps	(Gls)
2003–2009	Manlleu	83	(13)
2009–2010	Kitchee	17	(4)
2010–2013	Manlleu	83	(21)
2013–2014	Cornellà	32	(6)
2015–2017	Tona	56	(15)
2017–2018	Montañesa	15	(0)

International career
2013	Equatorial Guinea	1	(0)
- * Club domestic league appearances and goals

Baruc Nsue Burcet (born 2 November 1984), simply known as Baruc, is a former football midfielder. Born in Spain, he represented Equatorial Guinea at international level.

== International career ==
In July 2010, he received his first call for the Equatoguinean senior team and to play a friendly match against Morocco on 11 August 2010. But he had a bruised knee and didn't go. After a good 2012–13 season, in which he scored 10 goals in 34 league matches, Baruc received an international call again, this time for two FIFA World Cup qualifying matches against Cape Verde and Tunisia in June 2013. He made his debut in a friendly against Togo on 5 June 2013.

== Honours ==
Catalan Football Best Goal: 2012
