= Georges-Andre Machia =

Cameroonian footballer

Personal information
- Full name: Georges-Andre Machia Malock
- Date of birth: 26 March 1988 (age 38)
- Place of birth: Cameroon
- Height: 1.80 m (5 ft 11 in)
- Position: Forward

Senior career*
Years	Team	Apps	(Gls)
2006–2007	Victory Sports Club	18	(12)
2007–2008	PSLS Lhokseumawe		
2008–2009	Persis Solo		
2009–2011	TSW Pegasus		
2011–2012	PSLS Lhokseumawe		
2013	Persik Kediri		
2014	Pattani F.C.		
2015	Yala United F.C.		
2016	Chanthaburi F.C.		
- * Club domestic league appearances and goals

Georges-Andre Machia Malock (born 26 March 1988) is a Cameroonian former professional footballer who played as a forward.
