= Sha Tin SA =

Hong Kong football club

Supreme Sha Tin 至尊沙田
- Full name: Sha Tin Sports Association
- Founded: 1982; 44 years ago
- Ground: Hammer Hill Road Sports Ground; Sha Tin Sports Ground
- Owner: Wong Chi Chuen
- Head coach: Tom Ballantyne
- League: Hong Kong Premier League
- 2025–26: First Division, 9th of 14 (promoted)
Home colours	Away colours

Sha Tin Sports Association (Chinese: 沙田體育會), currently known as Supreme Sha Tin due to sponsorship reasons, is a Hong Kong professional football club based in the Sha Tin District. The club currently competes in the Hong Kong Premier League.

The club plays its home matches at Hammer Hill Road Sports Ground and Sha Tin Sports Ground.

== History ==
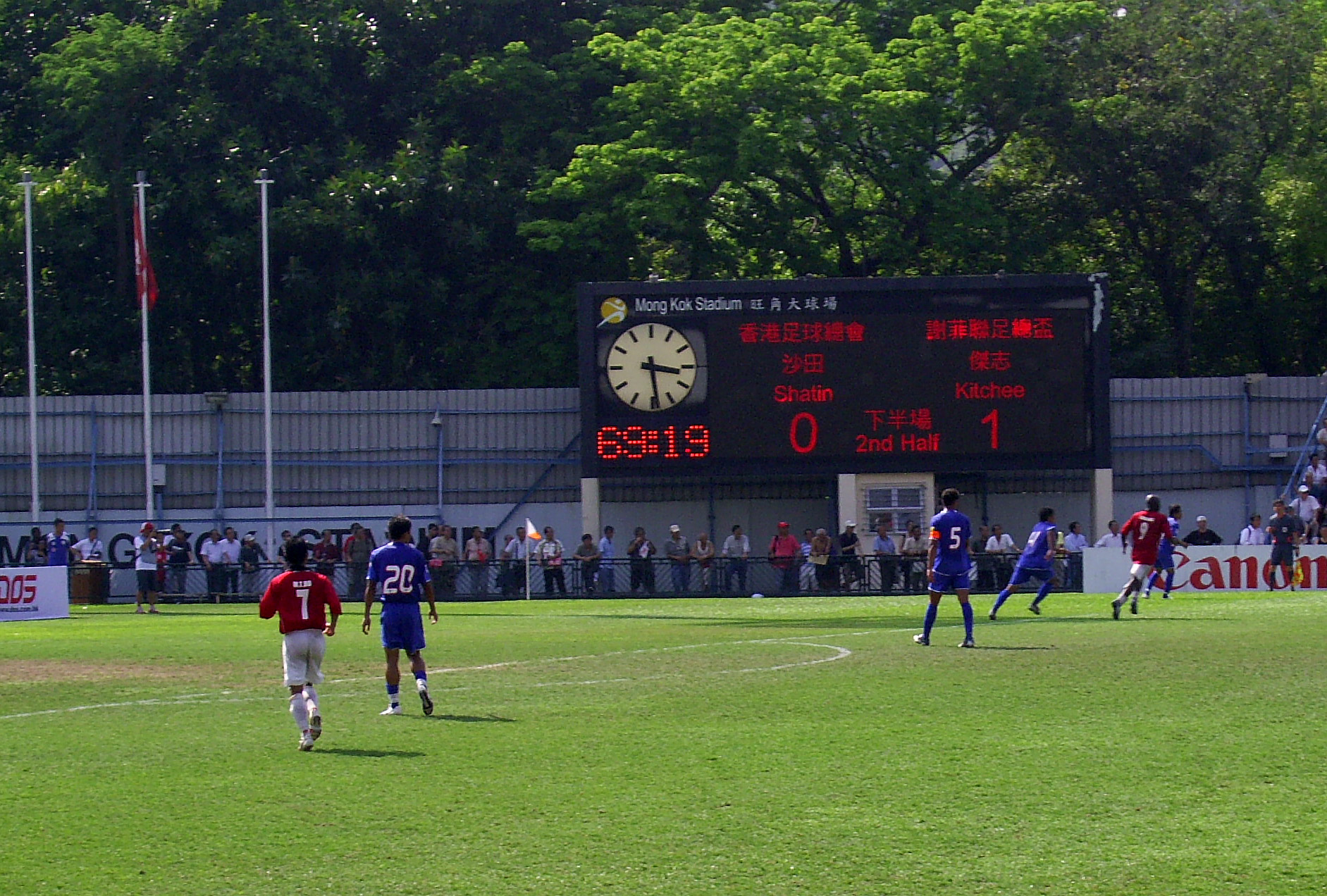
Sha Tin plays against Kitchee at the old Mong Kok Stadium.

In the 2002–03 season, the Hong Kong Football Association reformed the Hong Kong Second Division League and the Hong Kong Third Division League. The association suggested that different district councils form a football team based in their districts. The Sha Tin District Council therefore formed a football team, while the team started competing in the Hong Kong Third District Division.

Sha Tin, as 2008–09 Hong Kong Junior Shield winners, were invited to take part in the 2008–09 HKFA Cup by the HKFA. The team was drawn against Kitchee in the first round and lost the game 3–0.

After winning the Hong Kong Second Division title and gaining promotion in the 2008–09 season, Sha Tin competed in the top-tier Hong Kong First Division League during the 2009–10 season, but they were immediately relegated after finishing 9th out of 10 teams.

In the 2017–18 season, the club achieved its highest-ever finish, placing runners-up in the First Division.

Sha Tin obtained promotion to the Hong Kong Premier League for the 2026–27 season, competing under the sponsored name Supreme Sha Tin.

On 7 October 2026, the club signed Manchester City and Spanish legend David Silva on a short term deal.

== Name history ==
- 2002–2026: Sha Tin (沙田)
- 2026–: Supreme Sha Tin (至尊沙田)

== Team staff ==
Position	Staff
Head coach	(England) Tom Ballantyne
Technical director	(Hong Kong) Lee Wai Man
Assistant coaches	(Hong Kong) Chan Man Fai
Assistant coaches	(Hong Kong) Lam Ka Wai
Assistant coaches	(Hong Kong) Wong Zhi Dun

== Current squad ==
=== First team ===
As of 8 November 2026

Note: Flags indicate national team as defined under FIFA eligibility rules; some limited exceptions apply. Players may hold more than one non-FIFA nationality.

No.	Pos.	Nation	Player
1	GK	HKG	Wong Tsz Ho
3	DF	HKG	Wong Chak Ki
4	MF	HKG	Cheng Chun Wang
5	DF	HKG	Ng Tsz Chung
6	DF	BRA	Maurício
7	FW	HKG	Wong Chi Chuen
8	FW	HKG	Lam Hok Hei
9	FW	SCO	James Scott
10	MF	HKG	Lam Ka Wai
11	FW	JPN	Hugo Kametani
13	MF	HKG	Chan Man Fai
19	MF	HKG	Lam Lok Yin
20	DF	BRA	Matheus Dantas
22	DF	HKG	So Tsz Yin
24	DF	HKG	Philip To
25	GK	HKG	Tong Chung Hei

No.	Pos.	Nation	Player
26	DF	HKG	Wong Ching Hin
28	DF	HKG	Lai Hoi To
29	FW	HKG	Liu Hing Yau
30	MF	GHA	Jude Arthur
31	DF	HKG	Law Tsz Chun (captain)
32	MF	HKG	Chung Hei Long
39	GK	HKG	Lau Wai Hon
45	DF	GHA	Maxwell Ansah
46	DF	HKG	Leung Lap Tin
47	MF	JPN	Seito Takatori
66	DF	HKG	Lee Chak Shun
73	MF	HKG	Chiu Ching Yu
77	DF	ESP	Aitor Aldalur
91	FW	NGR	Mahmud Otubu
93	GK	MAC	Ho Man Fai

== Season-to-season record ==
Season	Tier	Division	Teams	Position	Home stadium	Attendance/G	FA Cup	Senior Shield	League Cup
2002–03	3	Third District Division	13				Did not enter		
2003–04	3	Third District Division					Did not enter		
2004–05	3	Third District Division					Did not enter		
2005–06	3	Third District Division	16	16			Did not enter		
2006–07	3	Third District Division	17	15			Did not enter		
2007–08	3	Third District Division	16	1			Did not enter		
2008–09	2	Second Division	10	1			Did not enter	First round	Did not enter
2009–10	1	First Division	10	9	Sha Tin Sports Ground	574	Quarter-finals	First round	Did not enter
2010–11	2	Second Division	12	4			Did not enter	Did not enter	Did not enter
2011–12	2	Second Division	12	7			Did not enter	Did not enter	Did not enter
2012–13	2	Second Division	11	7			Did not enter	Did not enter	Did not enter
2012–13	2	Second Division	12	4			Did not enter	Did not enter	Did not enter
2014–15	2	First Division	15	9			Round of 16	Did not enter	Did not enter
2015–16	2	First Division	14	7			Did not enter	Did not enter	Did not enter
2016–17	2	First Division	14	4			Did not enter	Did not enter	Did not enter
2017–18	2	First Division	16	2			Did not enter	Did not enter	Did not enter
2018–19	2	First Division	14	6			Did not enter	Did not enter	Did not enter
2019–20	2	First Division	14	Cancelled			Did not enter	Did not enter	Did not enter
2020–21	2	First Division	14	5			Did not enter	Did not enter	Did not enter
2021–22	2	First Division	14	Cancelled			Did not enter	Did not enter	Did not enter
2022–23	2	First Division	14	5			Did not enter	Did not enter	Did not enter
2023–24	2	First Division	12	4			Did not enter	Did not enter	Did not enter
2024–25	2	First Division	13	10			Did not enter	Did not enter	Did not enter
2025–26	2	First Division	14	9			Did not enter	Did not enter	Did not enter
2026–27	1	Premier League	11		Hammer Hill Road Sports Ground; Sha Tin Sports Ground			First round	

Note: 1st or Champions 2nd or Runners-up 3rd place Promotion Relegation

== Honours ==
=== League ===
- Hong Kong Second Division

Champions (1): 2008–09

- Hong Kong Third District Division

Champions (1): 2007–08

=== Cup competitions ===
- Hong Kong Junior Shield

Champions (3): 2007–08, 2008–09

- Hong Kong FA Cup Junior Division

Champions (1): 2017–18

== Head coaches ==
- (Hong Kong) Lee Wai Man (2007–2009)
- (Serbia) Dejan Antonic (2010)
- (Hong Kong) Lee Wai Man (2012–2026)
- (Hong Kong) Kwok Kar Lok (2026)
- (Hong Kong) Lee Wai Man (caretaker) (2026)
- (England) Tom Ballantyne (2026–present)
