= 2006–07 Hong Kong First Division League =

Hong Kong First Division
- Season: 2006–07
- Champions: South China
- Relegated: HKFC
- Matches: 90
- Goals: 295 (3.28 per match)
- Top goalscorer: Tales Schütz (South China)
- Average attendance: 1,548 (except HKFC vs Wofoo Tai Po and home matches of Lanwa Redbull)

Locations of the Hong Kong First Division League 2006–07 venues

The 2006–07 Hong Kong First Division League season was the 95th since its establishment.

In this season, the First Division was composed of 10 teams. HKFC and Tai Po have been promoted from the Second Division. The two bottom teams of the First Division last season, South China and Hong Kong 08, were reinstated.

South China won their 28th league title by defeating Lanwa Redbull in their last match of the season on 27 April 2007.

== League table ==
=== Full table ===
Pos	Team	Pld	W	D	L	GF	GA	GD	Pts	
1	South China (C)	18	13	3	2	47	18	+29	42 (Note: As South China won both the league title and the FA Cup, league runner-up Kitchee clinched the second qualification spot for AFC Cup 2008.)	2008 AFC Cup Group Stage
2	Kitchee	18	13	3	2	51	19	+32	42	2008 AFC Cup Group Stage
3	Xiangxue Sun Hei	18	9	4	5	33	18	+15	31	
4	Rangers	18	7	7	4	23	19	+4	28	
5	Lanwa Redbull	18	8	2	8	37	26	+11	26	
6	Happy Valley	18	7	4	7	27	29	−2	25	
7	Wofoo Tai Po	18	7	3	8	28	35	−7	24	
8	Citizen	18	5	4	9	26	32	−6	19	
9	HKFC (R)	18	3	2	13	12	46	−34	11	Relegation to Second Division
10	Hong Kong 08 (W)	18	1	2	15	11	53	−42	5	Withdrew from the league system

Rules for classification: According to the HKFA League Rules, if two or more clubs obtained equal points, their place shall be determined as follows:
1. Greater number of points obtained in the league matches between the Clubs concerned.
2. Goal difference resulting from the league matches between the Clubs concerned.
3. Greater number of goals scored in the group matches between the Clubs concerned.
4. Goal difference resulting from all league matches.
5. Greater number of goals scored in all league matches.
  (C) Champions; (R) Relegated; (W) Withdrew
  Notes:

First Division League 2006–07 winners

37th title

=== Home matches only ===
Pos	Team	Pld	W	D	L	GF	GA	GD	Pts
1	Kitchee	9	7	0	2	25	11	+14	21
2	South China	9	6	2	1	21	10	+11	20
3	Lanwa Redbull	9	5	0	4	23	11	+12	15
4	Rangers	9	4	3	2	13	11	+2	15
5	Xiangxue Sun Hei	9	4	2	3	17	10	+7	14
6	Wofoo Tai Po	9	4	2	3	16	17	−1	14
7	Citizen	9	2	3	4	14	13	+1	9
8	Happy Valley	9	2	3	4	9	13	−4	9
9	HKFC	9	1	1	7	6	22	−16	4
10	Hong Kong 08	9	0	1	8	5	28	−23	1

=== Away matches only ===
Pos	Team	Pld	W	D	L	GF	GA	GD	Pts
1	South China	9	7	1	1	26	8	+18	22
2	Kitchee	9	6	3	0	26	8	+18	21
3	Xiangxue Sun Hei	9	5	2	2	16	8	+8	17
4	Happy Valley	9	5	1	3	18	16	+2	16
5	Rangers	9	3	4	2	10	8	+2	13
6	Lanwa Redbull	9	3	2	4	14	15	−1	11
7	Wofoo Tai Po	9	3	1	5	12	18	−6	10
8	Citizen	9	3	1	5	12	19	−7	10
9	HKFC	9	2	1	6	6	24	−18	7
10	Hong Kong 08	9	1	1	7	6	25	−19	4

== Teams ==
Name	Last year position	Note
Citizen	6th	
Happy Valley	Champion	6th league title
HKFC	1st, Second Division	Newly promoted
Hong Kong 08	8th	Originally relegated, retained by HKFA
Rangers	3rd	
Kitchee FC	4th	
Lanwa	5th	
South China	7th	Originally relegated, retained by HKFA
Wofoo Tai Po	2nd, Second Division	Newly promoted
Xiangxue Sun Hei	2nd	

== Featured matches ==
- Highest scoring game

(round 12) (Hong Kong 08 0–8 South China)
The first match of South China after the official return of head coach Casemiro Mior. Scorer table leader Tales Schutz scored 4 goals in the match, the most goals in a match during the season.

- Biggest goal difference

(round 12) (Hong Kong 08 0–8 South China)
(refer to Highest Scoring Game)

- Highest attendance

(round 17) (Citizen 0–1 Rangers; South China 1–1 Kitchee)
The attendance was 8,426 and the matches were played in Mong Kok Stadium. It was the first time in 11 eleven years that Mong Kok Stadium is full for a First Division League match. (The full capacity of the stadium is 8,500. The unoccupied seats are due to unattended reserve tickets owners) It is also the first time since 1996 Senior Shield semi-final of Instant-Dict against South China where there is a full house in local Hong Kong football matches. One possible reason for the high attendance is that the result of the South China-Kitchee match may decide the champion of the season. Either South China won or Kitchee won by 3–0 or more, the winner would be granted champion. However, the match ended 1–1, which means that the league champion would be decided after the last round matches.

- Worst discipline match

(round 4) (Happy Valley 0–3 Kitchee)
In a match played on the National Day holiday, 5 players were sent off in the match. Three were from Happy Valley and two from Kitchee. A total of 5 red cards and 8 yellow cards were issued in the match.
(Round 4) (Xiangxue Sun Hei 1–2 Lanwa Redbull)
4 players of Xiangxue Sun Hei were sent off within the last 4 minutes of the match.

== Mid-season highlights ==
=== Statistics ===
- Number of matches: 45
- Number of draw matches: 9
- Number of matches with score difference: 36
- Average attendance: about 1,500 (50% higher than last season)
- Total goals: 145
- Average goal: 3.22 per match
- Top goalscorer: Tales Schutz of South China (8 goals)
- Hat-trick players: Keith Jerome Gumbs of Kitchee in 6–1 match against Wofoo Tai Po (Round 2), Julius Pongla Akosah of Kitchee in 4–0 match against HKFC (Round 6)
- Highest scoring games: (round 9) (Wofoo Tai Po 4–3 Happy Valley), (Round 2) (Wofoo Tai Po 1–6 Kitchee )
- Biggest goal difference: (round 3) (Lanwa Redbull 6–0 Wofoo Tai Po)

Scores	Number of occurrence	Corresponding matches
1–0	4	Rangers 1–0 Wofoo Tai Po; Kitchee 1–0 Lanwa Redbull; Happy Valley 1–0 Citizen; Happy Valley 1–0 Hong Kong 08
2–0	6	South China 2–0 HKFC; Kitchee 2–0 Xiangxue Sun Hei; Xiangxue Sun Hei 2–0 Citizen; Xiangxue Sun Hei 2–0 Hong Kong 08; South China 2–0 Kitchee; South China 2–0 Lanwa Redbull
2–1	5	Citizen 2–1 Hong Kong 08; Lanwa Redbull 2–1 Xiangxue Sun Hei; HKFC 2–1 Hong Kong 08; Rangers 2–1 Lanwa Redbull; Xiangxue Sun Hei 2–1 Wofoo Tai Po
3–0	4	Kitchee 3–0 Happy Valley; Rangers 3–0 South China; Rangers 3–0 Citizen; Xiangxue Sun Hei 3–0 HKFC
3–1	4	Lanwa Redbull 3–1 Hong Kong 08; South China 3–1 Hong Kong 08; South China 3–1 Happy Valley; Lanwa Redbull 3–1 HKFC
3–2	4	Lanwa Redbull 3–2 Citizen; South China 3–2 Wofoo Tai Po; Kitchee 3–2 Rangers; Kitchee 3–2 Citizen
4–0	1	Kitchee 4–0 HKFC
4–1	4	Kitchee 4–1 Hong Kong 08; Happy Valley 4–1 HKFC; Citizen 4–1 HKFC; Wofoo Tai Po 4–1 Hong Kong 08
4–2	1	Happy Valley 4–2 Lanwa Redbull
4–3	1	Wofoo Tai Po 4–3 Happy Valley
6–0	1	Lanwa Redbull 6–0 Wofoo Tai Po
6–1	1	Kitchee 6–1 Wofoo Tai Po
0–0	2	HKFC 0–0 Rangers; Citizen 0–0 Wofoo Tai Po
1–1	6	Happy Valley 1–1 Xiangxue Sun Hei; Xiangxue Sun Hei 1–1 Rangers; Citizen 1–1 South China; Rangers 1–1 Happy Valley; Wofoo Tai Po 1–1 HKFC; Hong Kong 08 1–1 Rangers
2–2	1	South China 2–2 Xiangxue Sun Hei

=== Mid-season standings ===
Pos	Team	Pld	W	D	L	GF	GA	GD	Pts
1	Kitchee	9	8	0	1	26	8	+18	24
2	South China	9	6	2	1	18	10	+8	20
3	Rangers	9	4	4	1	14	7	+7	16
4	Lanwa Redbull	9	5	0	4	20	14	+6	15
5	Xiangxue Sun Hei	9	4	3	2	14	9	+5	15
6	Happy Valley	9	4	2	3	16	15	+1	14
7	Citizen	9	2	2	5	11	15	−4	8
8	Wofoo Tai Po	9	2	2	5	13	23	−10	8
9	HKFC	9	1	2	6	6	22	−16	5
10	Hong Kong 08	9	0	1	8	7	22	−15	1

== Fixtures and results ==
All times are Hong Kong Time (UTC+8).
As of 14 April 2007

=== Round 1 ===
2 September 2006
15:30

Happy Valley	1–1	Xiangxue Sun Hei
Fabricio Lopes Alcantara (yellow card) 31'; Gerard Ambassa (yellow card) 74'; Feng Jizhi 76'; Fabio Lopes Alcantara (yellow card) 67' (yellow-red card) 79'	(in Chinese)	Lee Wai Lun (yellow card) 15'; Cordeiro (yellow card) 53'; Lico (yellow card) 58'; Lico 75' (pen.)

Hong Kong Stadium
Attendance: 1,343
Referee: Fung Ka Yu

3 September 2006
16:00

South China	2–0	HKFC
Marco Almeida 4'; Tales Schutz (yellow card) 64'; Tales Schutz 74'; Man Pei Tak (yellow card) 28' (yellow-red card) 90'	(in Chinese)	Wong Yiu Fu (yellow card) 53'; Chan Hon Hing (yellow card) 87'

Mong Kok Stadium
Attendance: 2,159
Referee: Fong Yau Fat

9 September 2006
15:00

Lanwa Redbull	3–2	Citizen
Fan Qi 22'; Fan Qi (yellow card) 27'; Zhang Yu (yellow card) 31'; Lin Zhong (yellow card) 45'; Geng Xin (yellow card) 66'; Zhu Xuyu 68'; Aldo Villalba 74'; You Long (yellow card) 88'	(in Chinese)	Fung Chung Ting (yellow card) 16'; Delphin Tshibanda Tshibangu 43'; Delphin Tshibanda Tshibangu (yellow card) 50'; Wang Zhengchuang (yellow card) 53'; Lai Kai Fai (yellow card) 79'; Leung Chun Pong (yellow card) 86'; Festus Baise 89'

Dongguan Stadium, Dongguan
Attendance: –
Referee: Fung Ka Yu

10 September 2006
14:00

Rangers	1–0	Wofoo Tai Po
Fan Weijun 31'; Yu Yang (yellow card) 47'; Alexandro Vieira Xavier (yellow card) 53'; Lo Kwan Yee (yellow card) 71'; Fung Ka Ki (yellow card) 90'	(in Chinese)	Lee Wai Lim (yellow card) 44'; Chan Sze Wing (yellow card) 56'; Leung Kam Fai (yellow card) 65'; Chiu Chun Kit (yellow card) 76'; Lui Chi Hing (yellow card) 79'

Mong Kok Stadium
Attendance: 1,214

10 September 2006
16:00

Kitchee	4–1	Hong Kong 08
Wilfed Ndzedzeni Bamnjo (yellow card) 32'; Cheung Kin Fung 43'; Keith Gumbs 50' (pen.); Akosah 67'; Wilfred Bamnjo 68'; Keith Gumbs (yellow card) 87'	(in Chinese)	Fung Kai Hong (yellow card) 30'; Chan Kin On (yellow card) 35'; So Wai Chuen (yellow card) 49'; Chan Ming Kong 57'

Mong Kok Stadium
Attendance: 1,214

=== Round 2 ===
16 September 2006
14:00

Wofoo Tai Po	1–6	Kitchee
Kwok Wing Sun (yellow card) 52'; So Loi Keung 90'	(in Chinese)	Keith Gumbs (yellow card) 14'; Akosah 23', 43' Keith Gumbs 45', 71', 89'; Ivan Jevic (yellow card) 62' Gao Wen 90'

Mong Kok Stadium
Attendance: 1,100

16 September 2006
16:00

Xiangxue Sun Hei	1–1	Rangers
Lico 32'; Xie Wei (yellow card) 45'; Chan Ka Ki (yellow card) 70'; Marcio Gabriel Anacleto (yellow card) 80'	(in Chinese)	Wisdom Fofo Agbo 32' (pen.); Wisdom Fofo Agbo (yellow card) 44'; Fung Ka Ki (yellow card) 90'; Leung Tsz Chun (yellow card) 90'

Mong Kok Stadium
Attendance: 1,100

16 September 2006
20:15

HKFC	1–4	Happy Valley
Michael Anthony Sealy (yellow card) 3'; Chan Hon Hing (yellow card) 37'; Cheng Lai Hin 70'	(in Chinese)	Vítor Hugo (yellow card) 25'; Sham Kwok Keung 52'; Lee Sze Ming 88'; Gerard Ambassa 89', 90'; Fabricio Lopes Alcantara (yellow card) 90'

HKFC Ground
Attendance: 172

17 September 2006
14:00

Hong Kong 08	1–3	Lanwa Redbull
Tsang Kam To 18'	(in Chinese)	You Long 20'; Chang Hui (yellow card) 39'; Aldo Villalba 41', 45'; Shang Yunlong (yellow card) 90'

Mong Kok Stadium
Attendance: 2,340

17 September 2006
16:00

Citizen	1–1	South China
Festus Baise 45' (pen.); Stephen Joseph Musah (yellow card) 61'	(in Chinese)	Chan Chi Hong (yellow card) 31'; Li Haiqiang 34'; Deng Jinghuang (yellow card) 55'; Michel Platini Ferreira Mesquita (yellow card) 74'

Mong Kok Stadium
Attendance: 2,340

=== Round 3 ===
22 September 2006
15:00

Lanwa Redbull	6–0	Wofoo Tai Po
Aldo Villalba 18'; Guo Rui (yellow card) 22'; Zhang Yu 42', 61'; Lin Zhong 65', 72', 90'; Fan Peng (yellow card) 82'	(in Chinese)	Lui Chi Hing (yellow card) 67'; Chan Yuk Chi (yellow card) 82'

Dongguan Stadium, Dongguan
Attendance: –

23 September 2006
14:00

Rangers	1–1	Happy Valley
Louis Berty Mvoguele Ayock (yellow card) 44'; Wisdom Fofo Agbo (yellow card) 20' (yellow-red card) 51'; Poon Yiu Cheuk 73' (o.g.); Lo Kwan Yee (yellow card) 74'	(in Chinese)	Gerard Ambassa (yellow card) 18'; Poon Yiu Cheuk (yellow card) 29'; Fabricio Lopes Alcantara (yellow card) 55'; Poon Man Tik 90'

Hong Kong Stadium
Attendance: 2,022

23 September 2006
16:00

Kitchee	2–0	Xiangxue Sun Hei
Keith Gumbs 8', 85'; Leung Chi Wing (yellow card) 13'; Ivan Jevic (yellow card) 15'; Luk Koon Pong (yellow card) 22'; Gao Wen (yellow card) 58'	(in Chinese)	Xie Wei (yellow card) 21'

Hong Kong Stadium
Attendance: 2,022

24 September 2006
14:00

Citizen	4–1	HKFC
Leung Chun Pong 12'; Festus Baise 34' (pen.); Wang Zhengchuang (yellow card) 53' (yellow-red card) 54'; Chao Pengfei 63'; Festus Baise (yellow card) 28' (yellow-red card) 76'; Chao Pengfei (yellow card) 83'; So Yiu Man 90'	(in Chinese)	Fung Hoi Man (yellow card) 32'; Michael Anthony Sealy 40' (pen.); Jaimes Mckee (red card) 54'; Lai Chun Kit (yellow card) 74'; Lawrence Chimezie Akandu (yellow card) 90'

Mong Kok Stadium
Attendance: 1,150

24 September 2006
16:00

South China	3–1	Hong Kong 08
Detinho 8', 37'; Tales Schutz 39'; Lee Chi Ho (yellow card) 59'; Hugo Nunes Coelho (yellow card) 62'; Cheng Siu Wai (yellow card) 82'	(in Chinese)	Lo Chun Kit (yellow card) 19'; Au Yeung Yiu Chung 62' (pen.); Chau Chun Wing (yellow card) 33' (yellow-red card) 66'

Mong Kok Stadium
Attendance: 1,150

=== Round 4 ===
29 September 2006
20:15

HKFC	0–0	Rangers
Cheng Ho Man (yellow card) 13'; Cheng Lai Hin (yellow card) 45'; Fung Hoi Man (yellow card) 68'	(in Chinese)	Louis Berty Mvoguele Ayock (yellow card) 19' (yellow-red card) 22'; Yu Yang (yellow card) 32'; Su Xiaoming (yellow card) 38'; Fan Weijun (yellow card) 42'; Alexandro Vieira Xavier (yellow card) 78'; Lo Kwan Yee (yellow card) 90'

HKFC Ground
Attendance: 124

30 September 2006
15:00

Wofoo Tai Po	2–3	South China
Chiu Chun Kit (yellow card) 58'; Joel Bertoti Padilha 68'; Chiu Chun Kit 70'	(in Chinese)	Kwok Kin Pong 2'; Tales Schutz (yellow card) 27'; Tales Schutz 54'; Yeung Ching Kwong 90'; Cheng Siu Wai (yellow card) 90'

Tai Po Sports Ground
Attendance: 2,020

1 October 2006
15:00

Happy Valley	0–3	Kitchee
Lee Wai Man (red card) 30'; Evanor (red card) 30'; Fabio Lopes Alcantara (yellow card) 45'; Gerard Ambassa (yellow card) 51'; Fabricio Lopes Alcantara (red card) 59'; Feng Jizhi (yellow card) 67'; Colly Barnes Ezeh (yellow card) 71'; Poon Man Tik (yellow card) 83'; Lee Sze Ming (yellow card) 87'	(in Chinese)	Ivan Jevic (yellow card) 7'; Gao Wen 13', 76'; Szeto Man Chun (red card) 30'; Akosah (red card) 59'; Liu Quankun (yellow card) 50'; Kwok Yue Hung 88'

Hong Kong Stadium
Attendance: 1,758

2 October 2006
14:00

Hong Kong 08	1–2	Citizen
Au Yeung Yiu Chungg 37'; Fung Kai Hong (yellow card) 45'; So Wai Chuen (yellow card) 53'; Yau Kam Leung (yellow card) 54'; Chan Ming Kong (yellow card) 59'	(in Chinese)	Moses Mensah (yellow card) 25'; Yuan Yang 36'; Chao Pengfei 43'; Delphin Tshibanda Tshibangu (yellow card) 74'; Lai Ka Fai (yellow card) 90'

Mong Kok Stadium
Attendance: 998

2 October 2006
16:00

Xiangxue Sun Hei	1–2	Lanwa Redbull
Lau Chi Keung (yellow card) 5'; Lee Kin Wo (yellow card) 30'; Lo Chi Kwan 51'; Chan Yiu Lun (yellow card) 65'; Chung Kin Hei (red card) 86'; Cordeiro (red card) 88'; Carlo Andre Bielemann Hartwig (red card) 90'; Lau Chi Keung (red card) 90'	(in Chinese)	Fan Qi (yellow card) 15'; Geng Xin (yellow card) 39'; Aldo Villalba 54'; Aldo Arsenio Villalba Torres (yellow card) 54'; You Long (yellow card) 89'; Qi Zhongxi 90' (pen.); Qi Zhongxi (yellow card) 90'

Mong Kok Stadium
Attendance: 998

=== Round 5 ===
6 October 2006
15:00

Lanwa Redbull	2–4	Happy Valley
Fan Qi (yellow card) 12'; Zhang Yu 44'; Yu Bo 45'; Geng Xin (yellow card) 32' (yellow-red card) 70'; Zhang Yu (yellow card) 90'	(in Chinese)	Poon Yiu Cheuk (yellow card) 10'; Vítor Hugo 31'; Vítor Hugo (yellow card) 45'; Gerard Ambassa 46', 90'; Feng Jizhi (yellow card) 77'; Gerard Ambassa (yellow card) 83'; Poon Man Tik 90'

Dongguan Stadium, Dongguan
Attendance: –

7 October 2006
14:00

Citizen	0–0	Wofoo Tai Po
Wu Haopeng (yellow card) 28'; Moses Mensah (yellow card) 63'	(in Chinese)	So Loi Keung (yellow card) 44'; So Hong Shing (yellow card) 46'; Joel Bertoti Padilha (yellow card) 65'; Christian Kwesi Annan (yellow card) 76'

Hong Kong Stadium
Attendance: 3,461

7 October 2006
16:00

South China	2–2	Xiangxue Sun Hei
Lee Chi Ho (yellow card) 31'; Wong Chun Yue 63'; Andre Gil Gomes Correia da Costa (yellow card) 68'; Detinho 76'; Detinho (yellow card) 77'	(in Chinese)	Lee Kin Wo (yellow card) 8'; Chan Yiu Lun (yellow card) 38'; Marico Gabriel Anacleto 40'; Kyle Jordan 48'; Marico Gabriel Anacleto (yellow card) 87'; Lico (yellow card) 88' (yellow-red card) 90'

Hong Kong Stadium
Attendance: 3,461

15 October 2006
14:00

Hong Kong 08	1–2	HKFC
Lo Chun Kit (yellow card) 23'; Au Yeung Yiu Chungg 36'; Wong Shun Him (red card) 70'; Fung Kai Hong (yellow card) 77'	(in Chinese)	Lawrence Chimezie 4'; Yeung Hei Chi (yellow card) 42'; Michael Anthony Sealy (yellow card) 64'; Lee Wai Tak (yellow card) 68'; Jaimes Mckee 80'; Hon Shing (yellow card) 90'

Hong Kong Stadium
Attendance: 1,463

15 October 2006
16:00

Kitchee	3–2	Rangers
Chan Siu Ki (yellow card) 33'; Kwok Yue Hung 36'; Wilfed Ndzedzeni Bamnjo 45'; Darko Rakocevic 80'; Wilfed Ndzedzeni Bamnjo (yellow card) 90'	(in Chinese)	Chan Wai Ho (yellow card) 19'; Wisdom Fofo Agbo (yellow card) 31'; Godfred Karikari 42', 63'; Alexandro Vieira Xavier (yellow card) 45'

Hong Kong Stadium
Attendance: 1,463

=== Round 6 ===
20 October 2006
20:15

HKFC	0–4	Kitchee
Wong Yiu Fu (yellow card) 34'; Lo Yiu Hung (yellow card) 36'; Lai Chun Kit (yellow card) 90'; Lawrence Chimezie Akandu (yellow card) 90'; Lee Wai Tik (yellow card) 90'	(in Chinese)	Chan Siu Ki 12'; Szeto Man Chun (yellow card); Akosah 69', 81', 90'

HKFC Ground
Attendance: 171

21 October 2006
14:00

Rangers	2–1	Lanwa Redbull
Chan Wai Ho 36'; Fan Weijun (yellow card) 45'; Wei Zhao (yellow card) 52'; Wong Chin Hung 71'	(in Chinese)	You Long (red card) 45'; Zhu Xuyu (yellow card) 62'; Qi Zhongxi (yellow card) 85'; Chang Hui 89'

Mong Kok Stadium
Attendance: 3,301

21 October 2006
16:00

Happy Valley	1–3	South China
Vítor Hugo (yellow card) 11'; Law Chun Bong (yellow card) 28'; Fabricio Lopes Alcantara (yellow card) 39'; Lee Wai Man (yellow card) 61'; Gerard Ambassa (yellow card) 79'; Fabricio Lopes Alcantara 82'; Poon Man Tik (yellow card) 90'	(in Chinese)	Tales Schutz 3', 17'; Detinho 14'; Kwok Kin Pong (yellow card) 19'; Lee Chi Ho (yellow card) 30'; Hugo Nunes Coelho (yellow card) 47'; Man Pei Tak (yellow card) 80'

Mong Kok Stadium
Attendance: 3,301

22 October 2006
14:00

Wofoo Tai Po	4–1	Hong Kong 08
Christian Kwesi Annan 12'; Chan Sze Wing (yellow card) 16'; Edgar Aldrighi Junior 79' (pen.); Lee Wai Lim 80'; Sze Kin Wai 89'	(in Chinese)	Au Yeung Yiu Chung (yellow card) 30'; Lau Nim Yat 48'; Yuen Kin Man (yellow card) 75'; Lau Nim Yat (yellow card) 76'; Lo Chun Kit (yellow card) 53' (yellow-red card) 79'; Chan Man Fai (yellow card) 87'

Mong Kok Stadium
Attendance: 1,067

22 October 2006
16:00

Xiangxue Sun Hei	2–0	Citizen
Chan Yiu Lun (yellow card) 36'; Lee Kin Wo 53'; Chu Siu Kei 90'	(in Chinese)	Chao Pengfei (yellow card) 41'; Stephen Joseph Musah (yellow card) 79'; Festus Baise (yellow card) 52' (yellow-red card) 83'

Mong Kok Stadium
Attendance: 1,067

=== Round 7 ===
27 October 2006
15:00

Lanwa Redbull	0–1	Kitchee
Wang Yunpeng (yellow card) 25'; Aldo Arsenio Villalba Torres (yellow card) 76'; Zhang Yu (yellow card) 57' (yellow-red card) 82'; Geng Xin (yellow card) 89'	(in Chinese)	Akosah 78'; Keith Gumbs (yellow card) 90'

Dongguan Stadium, Dongguan
Attendance: –

28 October 2006
14:00

Citizen	0–1	Happy Valley
Wang Zhengchuang (yellow card) 65'; Wu Haopeng (yellow card) 79'	(in Chinese)	Poon Yiu Cheuk 24'; Cheung Sai Ho 89'; Feng Jizhi (yellow card) 59' (yellow-red card) 90'

Mong Kok Stadium
Attendance: 2,780

28 October 2006
16:00

South China	0–3	Rangers
Detinho (yellow card) 28'; Man Pei Tak (yellow card) 35'	(in Chinese)	Godfred Karikari (yellow card) 14'; Lo Kwan Yee (yellow card) 25'; Fan Weijun 45'; Godfred Karikari 74', 90'

Mong Kok Stadium
Attendance: 2,780

29 October 2006
14:00

Hong Kong 08	0–2	Xiangxue Sun Hei
Fung Kai Hong (yellow card) 41'	(in Chinese)	Tse Man Wing 20'; Marcio Gabriel Anacleto (yellow card) 32'; Liang Xiang (yellow card) 41'; Cordeiro (yellow card) 82'; Lico 86' (pen.); Tse Man Wing (yellow card) 90'

Mong Kok Stadium
Attendance: 594

29 October 2006
16:00

Wofoo Tai Po	1–1	HKFC
Lee Wai Lim 9'; Chan Sze Wing (yellow card) 37'; Leung Kam Fai (yellow card) 68'; Chan Yuk Chi (yellow card) 90'	(in Chinese)	Lee Wai Tik (yellow card) 40'; Jaimes Mckee 68'; Lai Chun Kit (yellow card) 90'

Mong Kok Stadium
Attendance: 594

=== Round 8 ===
3 November 2006
20:15

HKFC	1–3	Lanwa Redbull
Lawrence Chimezie Akandu (yellow card) 37'; Wong Yiu Fu (yellow card) 45'; Lai Chun Kit (yellow card) 45'; Chan Man Chun (yellow card) 50'; Michael Anthony Sealy (yellow card) 81'; Cheng Lai Hin 81'; Chan Hon Hing (yellow card) 90'	(in Chinese)	Geng Xin 13'; Lin Zhong (yellow card) 31'; Hu Zhiqiang 34'; Aldo Arsenio Villalba Torres (yellow card) 37'; Tang Jun 41'

HKFC Ground
Attendance: 43

4 November 2006
14:00

Rangers	3–0	Citizen
Fan Weijun (yellow card) 17'; Chan Wai Ho (yellow card) 25'; Wisdom Fofo Agbo 31'; Wu Jun 40'; Lo Kwan Yee (yellow card) 44'; Alexandro Vieira Xavier (yellow card) 56'; Louis Berty Mvoguele Ayock 58'; Godfred Karikari (yellow card) 82'	(in Chinese)

Mong Kok Stadium
Attendance: 3,560

4 November 2006
16:00

Kitchee	0–2	South China
Luk Koon Pong (yellow card) 2'; Liu Quankun (yellow card) 45'; Gao Wen (red card) 54'; Chan Siu Ki (yellow card) 54'; Darko Rakocevic (yellow card) 74'	(in Chinese)	Kwok Kin Pong (yellow card) 61'; Tales Schutz 63'; Tales Schutz (yellow card) 63'; Detinho (yellow card) 71'; Kwok Kin Pong 84'; Deng Jinghuang (yellow card) 89'

Mong Kok Stadium
Attendance: 3,560

5 November 2006
14:00

Happy Valley	1–0	Hong Kong 08
Lee Sze Ming (yellow card) 26'; Cheung Sai Ho (yellow card) 28'; Lee Wai Man (yellow card) 29'; Fabio Lopes Alcantara 37'; Colly Barnes Ezeh (yellow card) 49'	(in Chinese)	Chow Ka Wa (yellow card) 61'

Mong Kok Stadium
Attendance: 951

5 November 2006
16:00

Xiangxue Sun Hei	2–1	Wofoo Tai Po
Lo Chi Kwan 21'; Lee Wai Lun (yellow card) 29'; Marico Gabriel Anacleto (yellow card) 36'; Lico 44'; Xie Wei (yellow card) 60'; Vítor Hugo (yellow card) 75'	(in Chinese)	So Loi Keung 26'; Leung Kam Fai (yellow card) 38'; Kwok Wing Sun (yellow card) 90'; Joel Bertoti Padilha (yellow card) 90'

Mong Kok Stadium
Attendance: 951

=== Round 9 ===
9 November 2006
20:00

South China	2–0	Lanwa Redbull
Man Pei Tak (yellow card) 37'; Lee Chi Ho (yellow card) 43'; Michel Platini Ferreira Mesquita (yellow card) 50'; Tales Schutz 52', 77'	(in Chinese)	Wang Yunpeng (yellow card) 18'; Tang Jun (yellow card) 41'; Hu Zhiqiang (yellow card) 58'; Shang Yunlong (yellow card) 77'

Mong Kok Stadium
Attendance: 1,264

11 November 2006
14:00

Citizen	2–3	Kitchee
Ju Yingzhi 70'; Delphin Tshibanda Tshibangu 84'; Festus Baise (yellow card) 87'	(in Chinese)	Chan Siu Ki (yellow card) 13'; Tam Siu Wai (yellow card) 14'; Li Jian (yellow card) 18'; Chan Siu Ki 31', 42'; Keith Gumbs 78'

Mong Kok Stadium
Attendance: 760

11 November 2006
16:00

Hong Kong 08	1–1	Rangers
Yau Kam Leung (yellow card) 7'; Chan Man Fai (yellow card) 58'; So Wai Chuen 60'	(in Chinese)	Godfred Karikari 38'; Louis Berty Mvoguele Ayock (yellow card) 56'; Alexandro Vieira Xavier (yellow card) 70'; Leung Chi Kui (yellow card) 85'

Mong Kok Stadium
Attendance: 760

12 November 2006
14:00

Wofoo Tai Po	4–3	Happy Valley
Joel Bertoti Padilha 49'; Christian Kwesi Annan 66', 90'; Sze Kin Wai 83'; Li Hon Ho (yellow card) 90'	(in Chinese)	Tong Kin Man (yellow card) 11'; Sui Weijie (yellow card) 22'; Evanor (yellow card) 43'; Gerard Ambassa 51', 53'; Colly Barnes Ezeh (yellow card) 57'; Gerard Ambassa (yellow card) 58'; Cheung Sai Ho (yellow card) 60'; Cheung Sai Ho 62'; Poon Man Tik (yellow card) 65'

Mong Kok Stadium
Attendance: 1,043

12 November 2006
16:00

Xiangxue Sun Hei	3–0	HKFC
Lee Wai Lun (yellow card) 49'; Lee Kin Wo 63'; Lico 64'; Vítor Hugo 84'	(in Chinese)	Lawrence Chimezie Akandu (yellow card) 24' (yellow-red card) 37'; Michael Anthony Sealy (yellow card) 55'; Chan Man Chun (yellow card) 80'; Michael John Challoner (red card) 85'

Mong Kok Stadium
Attendance: 1,043

=== Round 10 ===
17 November 2006
20:15

HKFC	3–2	South China
Jaimes Anthony Mckee 23', 63'; Chan Man Chun (yellow card) 40'; Torin William Didenko (yellow card) 62'; Chan Hon Hing 84'; Ho Kwok Chuen (yellow card) 87'	(in Chinese)	Tales Schutz; Yeung Ching Kwong (yellow card) 25'; Kwok Kin Pong (yellow card) 31'; Lee Chi Ho (yellow card) 37'; Mihailo Jovanovic (yellow card) 81'

HKFC Ground
Attendance: 427

18 November 2006
14:00

Wofoo Tai Po	0–2	Rangers
Leung Kam Fai (yellow card) 11'; Kwok Wing Sun (yellow card) 21'; Sze Kin Wai (red card) 72'; Edgar Aldrighi Junior (yellow card) 77'	(in Chinese)	Fan Weijun; Lam Ka Wai (yellow card) 29'; Louis Berty Mvoguele Ayock (yellow card) 2' (yellow-red card) 56'; Leung Tsz Chun (yellow card) 66'; Wei Zhao (yellow card) 81'

Mong Kok Stadium
Attendance: 1,520

18 November 2006
16:00

Xiangxue Sun Hei	0–2	Happy Valley
Vítor Hugo (yellow card) 16'; Lico (yellow card) 36'; Chung Kin Hei (yellow card) 69'; Cordeiro (yellow card) 89'	(in Chinese)	Sham Kwok Keung 39', 54'; Feng Jizhi (yellow card) 48'; Sham Kwok Fai (yellow card) 52'; Tong Kin Man (yellow card) 83'

Mong Kok Stadium
Attendance: 1,520

19 November 2006
14:00

Hong Kong 08	0–4	Kitchee
So Wai Chuen (yellow card) 16'; Lo Chun Kit (yellow card) 87'	(in Chinese)	Keith Jerome Gumbs 1', 39' 58'; Liu Quankun (yellow card) 12'; Luk Koon Pong (yellow card) 32'; Wilfed Ndzedzeni Bamnjo 80'

Mong Kok Stadium
Attendance: 468

19 November 2006
16:00

Citizen	2–2	Lanwa Redbull
Ju Yingxhi 14'; Delphin Tshibanda Tshibangu 40'; Wu Haopeng (yellow card) 44'; Yaw Anane (yellow card) 65'; Xu Deshuai (yellow card) 77'; Leung Chun Pong (yellow card) 79'	(in Chinese)	Zhang Yu 9'; Zhang Yu (yellow card) 17'; Wen Kai (yellow card) 20'; Wang Yunpeng (yellow card) 33'; Zhu Xuyu (yellow card) 39'; Aldo Arsenio Villalba Torres 86'

Mong Kok Stadium
Attendance: 468

=== Round 11 ===
24 November 2006
15:00

Lanwa Redbull	2–0	Hong Kong 08
Zhu Xuyu (yellow card) 49'; Ye Nan (yellow card) 52'; Li Ka Wing 66' (o.g.); Aldo Arsenio Villalba Torres 77'	(in Chinese)	Lau Nim Yat (yellow card) 45'; Wong Shun Him (yellow card) 53'; Au Yeung Yiu Chung (yellow card) 65'

Dongguan Stadium, Dongguan
Attendance: –

25 November 2006
14:00

Happy Valley	0–1	HKFC
Sham Kwok Keung (yellow card) 24'; Lee Sze Ming (yellow card) 71' (yellow-red card) 81'; Vandre Sagrillo Monteiro (yellow card) 90'	(in Chinese)	Lai Chun Kit (yellow card) 6'; Destiny O Ugo (yellow card) 21'; Lee Wai Tak (yellow card) 27'; Michael Anthony Sealy (yellow card) 87'; Torin William Didenko (yellow card) 89'; Chan Ka Hing 83'

Mong Kok Stadium
Attendance: 769

25 November 2006
16:00

Rangers	2–4	Xiangxue Sun Hei
Fung Ka Ki (yellow card) 14'; Godfred Karikari 24', 84'; Fan Weijun (yellow card) 52'	(in Chinese)	Pinto, Da Silva, Joao Miguel 3'; Marcio Gabriel 16'; Lico 27', 90'; Pinto, Da Silva, Joao Miguel (yellow card) 29'; Lo Chi Kwan (yellow card) 34'

Mong Kok Stadium
Attendance: 769

26 November 2006
14:00

Kitchee	1–2	Wofoo Tai Po
Tam Siu Wai (yellow card) 79'; Keith Jerome Gumbs (yellow card) 83'; Chan Siu Ki (yellow card) 88'; Leung Chi Wing (yellow card) 90'; Chan Siu Ki 90'	(in Chinese)	Christian Kwesi Annan 40'; So Hong Shing (yellow card) 73'; So Loi Keung (yellow card) 75'; Joel Bertoti Padilha 90'

Mong Kok Stadium
Attendance: 1,749

26 November 2006
16:00

South China	5–2	Citizen
Tales Schutz 15'; Bai He (yellow card) 25'; Kwok Kin Pong 51', 84'; Li Haiqiang 56'; Cristiano Alves Pereira (yellow card) 75'; Man Pei Tak (yellow card) 84'; Au Wai Lun 84'	(in Chinese)	Wang Zhengchuang (yellow card) 32'; Festus Baise (yellow card) 60'; Deplhin Tshibanda Tshibangu 71'; Leung Chun Pong 76' (pen.); Lai Ka Fai (yellow card) 82'

Mong Kok Stadium
Attendance: 1,749

=== Round 12 ===
3 December 2006
14:00

Wofoo Tai Po	2–0	Lanwa Redbull
Silvano (yellow card) 12'; So Loi Keung 43'; Kwok Wing Sun (yellow card) 50'; Joel 88'	(in Chinese)	Geng Xin (yellow card) 2' (yellow-red card) 28'; Li Lingjun (yellow card) 16' (yellow-red card) 30'; Zhang Yu (yellow card) 50'

Mong Kok Stadium
Attendance: 1,885

3 December 2006
16:00

Hong Kong 08	0–8	South China
Fung Kai Hong (yellow card) 4'	(in Chinese)	Tales Schutz 5' (pen.), 31', 41', 52'; Wong Chun Yue 26'; Chan Chi Hong (yellow card) 27'; Tales Schutz (yellow card) 45'; Detinho 61', 81'; Li Haiqiang 89'

Mong Kok Stadium
Attendance: 1,885

15 December 2006
20:15

HKFC	0–1	Citizen
Ho Kwok Chuen (yellow card) 13'; Lai Chun Kit (yellow card) 37'; Destiny O Ugo (yellow card) 84'	(in Chinese)	Anthony Dela Nyatepe (yellow card) 11'; Leung Chun Pong 14' (pen.); Chao Pengfei (yellow card) 57'; Yuan Yang (yellow card) 86'

HKFC Ground
Attendance: 101

17 December 2006
14:00

Happy Valley	0–0	Rangers
Vandre Sagrillo Monteiro (yellow card) 44'; Li Ming (yellow card) 50' (yellow-red card) 90'; Engelbert Romaric Asse-Etoga (yellow card) 90'; Lee Wai Man (yellow card) 90'	(in Chinese)	Alexandro Vieira Xavier (yellow card) 60'; Godfred Karikari (yellow card) 76'

Mong Kok Stadium
Attendance: 1,948

17 December 2006
16:00

Xiangxue Sun Hei	3–3	Kitchee
Marcio Gabriel Anaclato (yellow card) 28'; Lico 41'; Chu Siu Kei 45'; Lee Wai Lun (yellow card) 5' (yellow-red card) 66'; Victor Eromosele Inegbenoise 70'; Chan Yiu Lun (yellow card) 84'; Tse Man Wing (yellow card) 90'	(in Chinese)	Leung Chi Wing (yellow card) 21'; Chan Siu Ki 30'; Keith Gumbs 45'; Wilfred Ndzedzeni Bamnjo 48'; Gao Wen (yellow card) 79' (yellow-red card) 84'

Mong Kok Stadium
Attendance: 1,948

=== Round 13 ===
26 January 2007
15:00

Lanwa Redbull	0–1	Xiangxue Sun Hei
Luo Jing (yellow card) 38'; Geng Xin (yellow card) 60'; Wang Gang (yellow card) 69'; Ye Nan (yellow card) 90'	(in Chinese)	Lico 46'; Lo Chi Kwan (yellow card) 86'

Dongguan Stadium, Dongguan
Attendance: –

27 January 2007
14:00

Rangers	3–1	HKFC
Godfred Karikari 3', 41'; Wong Chin Hung 23'; Godfred Karikari (yellow card) 67'	(in Chinese)	Jaimes Mckee 60'; Ma Ka Ki (yellow card) 63'; Wong Yiu Fu (yellow card) 90'

Mong Kok Stadium
Attendance: 1,156

28 January 2007
16:00

Kitchee	5–0	Happy Valley
Keith Gumbs 17'; Anderson Da Silva 37'; Julius Akosah 40', 49', 88'	(in Chinese)	Sham Kwok Fai (yellow card) 59'; Tong Kin Man (yellow card) 68'

Mong Kok Stadium
Attendance: 1,156

28 January 2007
14:00

Citizen	5–1	Hong Kong 08
Chao Pengfei 7'; Yuan Yang 17'; Li Chun Yip 33', 85'; Yaw Anane 81'	(in Chinese)	Chan Man Fai 4'; Chan Ka Wa (yellow card) 63'

Mong Kok Stadium
Attendance: 1,519

28 January 2007
16:00

South China	4–1	Wofoo Tai Po
Detinho 7', 29'; Au Wai Lun 17'; Chan Chi Hong 20'; Li Chi Ho (yellow card) 55'	(in Chinese)	Edgar Aldrighi Junior 32' (pen.)

Mong Kok Stadium
Attendance: 1,519

=== Round 14 ===
22 March 2007
18:00

Wofoo Tai Po	1–1	Citizen
Chung Kin Keung 19'; Kwok Wing Sun (yellow card) 20'	(in Chinese)	Leung Chun Pong (yellow card) 22'; Joreg Claudio C. Rodrigues 27'; Anthony Nyatepe (yellow card) 44'; Li Ying Wai (yellow card) 90'; Festus Baise (yellow card) 90'

Mong Kok Stadium
Attendance: 537

22 March 2007
20:00

Rangers	1–1	Kitchee
Ghislain Bell Bell 23'; Wei Zhao (red card) 29'; Yu Yang (yellow card) 41'; Louis Berty Mvoguele Ayock (yellow card) 60'; Xiao Guoji (yellow card) 86'	(in Chinese)	Anderson Da Silva 32'; Gao Wen (yellow card) 35'; Keith Gumbs (yellow card) 60'; Szeto Man Chun (yellow card) 66'; Tam Siu Wai (yellow card) 77'; Darko Rakocevic (yellow card) 82'

Mong Kok Stadium
Attendance: 537

23 March 2007
20:15

HKFC	1–2	Hong Kong 08
Akandu Lawrence Chimezie 9'; Destiny O Ugo (yellow card) 28'; Chan Hon Hing (yellow card) 32'	(in Chinese)	Lo Chun Kit (yellow card) 35'; So Wai Chuen 36'; Fung Kai Hong (yellow card) 48'; Yuen Kin Man (yellow card) 64'; Chan Man Fai 88'

HKFC Ground
Attendance: 69

24 March 2007
14:00

Happy Valley	1–1	Lanwa Redbull
Engelbert Romaric Asse-Etoga (yellow card) 12'; Poon Yiu Cheuk 37' (PEN); Cheung Sai Ho (yellow card) 80'		Wang Fengqing (yellow card) 35'; Luo Jing (yellow card) 38'; Zhang Yu (yellow card) 45'; Wang Gang (yellow card) 54'; Evanor 60' (o.g.)

Mong Kok Stadium
Attendance: 2,265

24 March 2007
16:00

Xiangxue Sun Hei	0–1	South China
Chu Siu Kei (yellow card) 8'; Lo Chi Kwan (yellow card) 11'; Cordeiro (yellow card) 47'; Lico (yellow card) 90'		Detinho 15'; Tales Schutz (yellow card) 52'; Man Pei Tak (yellow card) 90'; Deng Jinghuang (yellow card) 90'; Au Wai Lun (yellow card) 90'

Mong Kok Stadium
Attendance: 2,265

=== Round 15 ===
30 March 2007
15:00

Lanwa Redbull	3–0	Rangers
Liu Chong (yellow card) 15'; Ye Nan (yellow card) 16'; Aldo Arsenio Villalba Torres (yellow card) 21'; Zhang Yu (yellow card) 24'; Aldo Arsenio Villalba Torres 45', 77'; Ye Nan 50'; Qi Zhongxi (yellow card) 67'	(in Chinese)	Godfred Karikari (yellow card) 26'; Alexandre De Moraes (yellow card) 44'; Chan Wai Ho

Dongguan Stadium, Dongguan
Attendance: –
Referee: Lui Siu Chuen

31 March 2007
14:00

Citizen	0–3	Xiangxue Sun Hei
Joreg Claudio C. Rodrigues (yellow card) 59'; Wang Zhengchuang (yellow card) 62'	(in Chinese)	Victor Eromosele Inegbenoise (yellow card) 24'; Chu Siu Kei 43'; Tse Man Wing (yellow card) 45'; Lau Chi Keung 59'; Xie Wei 88'

Mong Kok Stadium
Attendance: 1,945

31 March 2007
16:00

South China	2–0	Happy Valley
Yaw Anane (yellow card) 27'; Tales Schutz 32'; Detinho 54'	(in Chinese)	Vandre Sagrillo Monterio (yellow card) 82'; Poon Yiu Cheuk (yellow card) 90'

Mong Kok Stadium
Attendance: 1,945

1 April 2007
14:00

Hong Kong 08	0–3	Wofoo Tai Po
Yuen Kin Man (yellow card) 26'; Law Wing Lun (yellow card) 23' (yellow-red card) 41'	(in Chinese)	Joel Bertoti Padilha 12'; Lee Hong Lim (yellow card) 45'; So Loi Keung 49'; Christian Kwesi Annan 56'

Mong Kok Stadium
Attendance: 576

1 April 2007
16:00

Kitchee	4–0	HKFC
Anderson Da Silva 20', 60'; Chan Siu Ki 45'; Lin Junsheng (yellow card) 73'; Liu Quankun 89'; Chan Siu Ki (yellow card) 90'	(in Chinese)	Lee Wai Tik (yellow card) 57'; Destiny O Ugo (yellow card) 67'

Mong Kok Stadium
Attendance: 576

=== Round 16 ===
5 April 2007
20:15

HKFC	0–3	Wofoo Tai Po
Destiny O Ugo (yellow card) 17'; Lee Wai Tik (yellow card) 59'; Cheung Tsz Kin (yellow card) 62'; Chan Ka Hing (yellow card) 70'; Li Hang Wui (yellow card) 77'	(in Chinese)	Joel Bertoti Padilha 23'; Christian Kwesi Annan (yellow card) 61'; Edgar Aldrighi Junior 71'; Jack Sealy 87' (o.g.)

HKFC Ground
Attendance: –

6 April 2007
14:00

Xiangxue Sun Hei	5–0	Hong Kong 08
Cordeiro 33'; Antonio Davila 51', 85'; Tse Man Wing (yellow card) 77'; Chan Ho Man 89'; Xie Wei 90'	(in Chinese)	Fung Kai Hong (yellow card) 38'

Mong Kok Stadium
Attendance: 712

6 April 2007
16:00

Happy Valley	1–2	Citizen
Sham Kwok Keung 38'; Evanor (yellow card) 43'; Li Ming (yellow card) 75'; Poon Yiu Cheuk (yellow card) 81'; Vandré Monteiro (yellow card) 89'	(in Chinese)	Leung Chun Pong 7'; Wu Haopeng (yellow card) 21'; Ju Yingzhi 64'; Li Chun Yip (yellow card) 76'; Moses Mensah (yellow card) 90'

Mong Kok Stadium
Attendance: 712

8 April 2007
14:00

Kitchee	3–2	Lanwa Redbull
Darko Rakocevic (yellow card) 20'; Julius Akosah 26', 45', 57'; Wang Zhenpeng (yellow card) 89'	(in Chinese)	Aldo Arsenio Villalba Torres 21' (pen.); Wen Kai 78'; Wang Gang (yellow card) 88'

Mong Kok Stadium
Attendance: 2,766

8 April 2007
16:00

Rangers	0–3	South China
Godfred Karikari (yellow card) 24'; Ghislain Bell Bell (yellow card) 28'; Louis Berty Mvoguele Ayock (yellow card) 40'; Lo Kwan Yee (yellow card) 68'; Chan Wai Ho (yellow card) 70'; Fan Weijun (red card) 82'	(in Chinese)	Tales Schutz 12'; Detinho 45', 77'; Christiano Pereira (yellow card) 60'; Lee Chi Ho (yellow card) 77'

Mong Kok Stadium
Attendance: 2,766

=== Round 17 ===
13 April 2007
15:00

Lanwa Redbull	6–0	HKFC
Aldo Arsenio Villalba Torres 19' (pen.), 60'; Wen Kai 21'; Qi Zhongxi (yellow card) 27'; Lin Zhong 43'; Lin Zhong (yellow card) 43'; Ye Nan 45'; Luo Jing 77'	(in Chinese)	Chan Man Chun (yellow card) 18'; Lawrence Chimezie Akandu (yellow card) 26'; Cheng Lai Hin (yellow card) 31'; Lee Wai Tik (yellow card) 46'

Dongguan Stadium, Dongguan
Attendance: –

14 April 2007
14:00

Hong Kong 08	1–3	Happy Valley
Wong Shun Him (yellow card) 23'; Lo Chun Kit (yellow card) 28'; Lee Sze Ho (yellow card) 75'; Yu Ho Pong 75'	(in Chinese)	Sham Kwok Fai (yellow card) 12'; Sham Kwok Kweng 27'; Law Chun Bong 33'; Lee Sze Ming 90'

Mong Kok Stadium
Attendance: 424

14 April 2007
16:00

Wofoo Tai Po	1–0	Xiangxue Sun Hei
Joel Bertoti (yellow card) 66'; Lee Hong Lim 72'	(in Chinese)	Tse Man Wing (yellow card) 47'

Mong Kok Stadium
Attendance: 424

15 April 2007
14:00

Citizen	0–1	Rangers
	(in Chinese)	Ye Jia 23'; Ghislaian Bell Bell (yellow card) 90'

Mong Kok Stadium
Attendance: 8,426

15 April 2007
16:00

South China	1–1	Kitchee
Li Haiqiang 58'; Deng Jinghuang (yellow card) 84'; Zheng Chunhui (yellow card) 90'	(in Chinese)	Julius Akosah (yellow card) 19'; Julius Akosah 57'; Ivan Jevic (yellow card) 40'; Anderson Da Silva (yellow card) 25' (yellow-red card) 69'; Liu Quankun (yellow card) 78'; Keith Gumbs (yellow card) 90'

Mong Kok Stadium
Attendance: 8,426

=== Round 18 ===
27 April 2007
15:00

Lanwa Redbull	1–3	South China
Lin Zhong 49' (yellow card) 49'; Fan Peng (yellow card) 76'; Aldo Arsenio Villalba Torres (yellow card) 77'; Liu Zhong (yellow card) 90'	(in Chinese)	Man Pei Tak (yellow card) 14'; Detinho 28' 57' 67'; Edemar Antonio Picoli (yellow card) 71'

Dongguan Stadium, Dongguan
Attendance: –

28 April 2007
15:00

Happy Valley	4–2	Wofoo Tai Po
Sham Kwok Fai (yellow card) 22'; Evanor 49'; Gerard Ambassa 54'; Poon Man Tik 82'; Law Chun Bong 85'	(in Chinese)	Lee Hong Lim 2'; Lee Wai Lim 32'; Chan Yuk Chi (yellow card) 90'

Mong Kok Stadium
Attendance: 345

28 April 2007
20:15

HKFC	0–3	Xiangxue Sun Hei
Chan Man Chin (yellow card) 12'; Ma Ka Ki (yellow card) 41'	(in Chinese)	Lico 46' 50'; Chan Ho Man 56'

HKFC Ground
Attendance: 61

29 April 2007
14:00

Rangers	0–0	Hong Kong 08
Chan Siu Yuen (yellow card) 63'; Ghislain Bell Bell (yellow card) 67'; Chak Ting Fung (yellow card) 88'	(in Chinese)	Fung Kai Hong (yellow card) 72'

Mong Kok Stadium
Attendance: 423

29 April 2007
16:00

Kitchee	3–2	Citizen
Julius Akosah 40'; Chan Siu Ki 44' 68'; Liu Quankun (yellow card) 81'; Chan Siu Ki (yellow card) 90'	(in Chinese)	Stephen Musah 21' 79'; Stephen Musah (yellow card) 39'; Wang Zhengchuang (yellow card) 90'

Mong Kok Stadium
Attendance: 423

== Scorers ==
17 goals

- Tales Schutz of South China (top goalscorer of this season)

15 goals

- Detinho of South China
- Julius Akosah of Kitchee

12 goals

- Aldo Arsenio Villalba Torres of Lanwa Redbull
- Keith Gumbs of Kitchee

11 goals

- Lico of Xiangxue Sun Hei

9 goals

- Godfred Karikari of Rangers

8 goals

- Chan Siu Ki of Kitchee

7 goals

- Gerard Ambassa of Happy Valley

6 goals

- Joel of Wofoo Tai Po

5 goals

- Christian Kwesi Annanof Wofoo Tai Po
- Jaimes Mckee of HKFC
- Sham Kwok Keung of Happy Valley

4 goals

- Anderson da Silva of Kitchee
- Delphin Tshibanda Tshibangu of Citizen
- Fan Weijun of Rangers
- Kwok Kin Pong of South China
- Leung Chun Pong of Citizen
- Li Haiqiang of South China
- So Loi Keung of Wofoo Tai Po
- Wilfed Ndzedzeni Bamnjo of Kitchee
- Zhang Yu of Lanwa Redbull
- Lin Zhong of Lanwa Redbull

3 goals

- Au Yeung Yiu Chungg of Hong Kong 08
- Chao Pengfei of Citizen
- Chu Siu Kei of Xiangxue Sun Hei
- Edgar Aldrighi Junior of Wofoo Tai Po
- Festus Baise of Citizen
- Gao Wen of Kitchee
- Lee Wai Lim of Wofoo Tai Po
- Poon Man Tik of Happy Valley
- Ju Yingzhi of Citizen

2 goals

- Akandu Lawrence Chimezie of HKFC
- Antonio Serrano Davila of Xiangxue Sun Hei
- Au Wai Lun of South China
- Chan Ho Man of Xiangxue Sun Hei
- Chan Man Fai of Hong Kong 08
- Cheng Lai Hin of HKFC
- Kwok Yue Hung of Kitchee
- Law Chun Bong of Happy Valley
- Lee Hong Lim of Wofoo Tai Po
- Lee Kin Wo of Xiangxue Sun Hei
- Lee Sze Ming of Happy Valley
- Li Chun Yip of Citizen
- Lo Chi Kwan of Xiangxue Sun Hei
- Marcio Gabriel Anaclato of Xiangxue Sun Hei
- Poon Yiu Cheuk of Happy Valley
- So Wai Chuen of Hong Kong 08
- Stephen Musah of Citizen
- Sze Kin Wai of Wofoo Tai Po
- Vítor Hugo of Xiangxue Sun Hei
- Wen Kai of Lanwa Redbull
- Wong Chin Hung of Rangers
- Wong Chun Yue of South China
- Xie Wei of Xiangxue Sun Hei
- Ye Nan of Lanwa Redbull
- Yuan Yang of Citizen

Scorers with 1 goal are not listed here.

== Annual awards ==
=== Hong Kong Footballer of the Year ===
- Li Haiqiang of South China

=== Hong Kong Top Footballer ===
- Detinho of South China
- Lo Chi Kwan of Xiangxue Sun Hei
- Li Haiqiang of South China
- Gerard Ambassa of Happy Valley
- Vandre Sagerillo Monteiro of Happy Valley
- Zhang Chunhui of South China
- Keith Gumbs of Kitchee
- Cristiano Cordeiro of Xiangxue Sun Hei
- Ivan Jević of Kitchee
- Chan Wai Ho of South China
- Christian Kwesi Annan of Wofoo Tai Po

=== Most Favorite Player ===
- Cristiano Cordeiro of Xiangxue Sun Hei

=== Best coach ===
- Casemiro Mior of South China

=== Best Youth Players ===
- Leung Chun Pong of Citizen AA
- Chan Siu Ki of Kitchee FC

== See also ==
- Hong Kong First Division League
- The Hong Kong Football Association
- 2006–07 in Hong Kong football
- 2006–07 Hong Kong FA Cup
- 2006–07 Hong Kong League Cup
- 2006–07 Hong Kong Senior Challenge Shield
