= 2006–07 Xiangxue Sun Hei season =

Sun Hei SC
2006–07 season
- President: (Hong Kong) Chow Man Leung
- Head coach: (Malaysia) Koo Luam Khen
- League
- Shield
- FA Cup
- League Cup

The 2006–07 season is the 11th season of Sun Hei SC in Hong Kong First Division League. The team was coached by Malaysian coach Koo Luam Khen.

== Squad statistics ==
No.	Pos.	Name	League		Shield		FA Cup		League Cup		AFC Cup		Total	
No.	Pos.	Name	Apps	Goals	Apps	Goals	Apps	Goals	Apps	Goals	Apps	Goals	Apps	Goals
1	GK	(Macau) Domingos Chan												
2	DF	(Hong Kong) Tseng Siu Wing												
3	DF	(Hong Kong) Chung Kin Hei												
5	DF	(Brazil) André												
6	MF	(Hong Kong) Lau Chi Keung												
7	MF	(Hong Kong) Chu Siu Kei												
8	FW	(Peru) Antonio Serrano Dávila												
9	FW	(Brazil) Márcio												
10	MF	(Hong Kong) Chan Yiu Lun												
11	MF	(Hong Kong) Lee Kin Wo												
12	DF	(Hong Kong) Tse Man Wing												
14	MF	(Hong Kong) Lo Chi Kwan												
15	DF	(Hong Kong) Lee Wai Lun												
16 / 9	MF	(Hong Kong) Lai Kai Cheuk												
16	FW	(Hong Kong) Steve												
17	GK	(Hong Kong) Tung Ho Yin												
18	FW	(Hong Kong) Chan Ho Man												
19	MF	(Brazil) Lico												
20	FW	(England) Kyle Jordan												
20	FW	(Brazil) Vítor Hugo												
20	FW	(Nigeria) Victor Inegbenoise												
21	GK	(Hong Kong) Chan Ka Ki												
22	MF	(China) Liang Xiang												
22	FW	(Brazil) Giovane												
23	DF	(Brazil) João Miguel												
26	DF	(China) Xie Wei												
33	DF	(Hong Kong) Cristiano Cordeiro												
–	–	Own goals	–		–		–		–		–		–	

Statistics accurate as of match played 31 May 2007
