= 2006–07 Hong Kong Senior Shield =

Tournament details
- Country: Hong Kong
- Teams: 10

Final positions
- Champions: South China (29th title)
- Runners-up: Sun Hei

Tournament statistics
- Matches played: 9
- Goals scored: 22 (2.44 per match)

The Hong Kong Senior Shield 2006–07, also known as the 2006–07 HKFA Choi Fung Hong Senior Shield, was the 105th staging of the Hong Kong's oldest football knockout competition.

The competition started on 10 December 2006 with 10 Hong Kong First Division clubs and concluded on 21 January 2007 with the final.

South China captured their 20th title of the competition after beating Xiangxue Sun Hei by 2-1 in the final.

== Teams ==
- Citizen
- Happy Valley
- HKFC
- Hong Kong 08
- Rangers
- Kitchee
- Lanwa Redbull
- South China
- Wofoo Tai Po
- Xiangxue Sun Hei

== Fixtures and results ==
All times are Hong Kong Time (UTC+8).

=== Bracket ===
First round
Hong Kong 08	1
HKFC	2
Rangers	0
South China	1

Quarter-finals
Kitchee	1
HKFC	0
Xiangxue Sun Hei	2
Citizen	1
Wofoo Tai Po	0
Lanwa Redbull	1
South China (p)	2 (5)
Happy Valley	2 (3)

Semi-finals
Kitchee	0
Xiangxue Sun Hei	1
Lanwa Redbull	1
South China	4

Final
Xiangxue Sun Hei	1
South China	2

Hong Kong Senior Shield 2006-07 Winner

South China
Twentieth Title

=== First round ===
10 December 2006
15:00

Hong Kong 08	1–2	Hong Kong FC
Chau Chun Wing (yellow card) 64'; So Wai Chuen (yellow card) 70'; Chan Ming Kong (yellow card) 80'; Tsang Kam To 83'	(in Chinese)	Jaimes Mckee 25', 59'; Chan Ka Hing (yellow card) 29'; Torin Didenko (yellow card) 70'

Mong Kok Stadium
Attendance: 227

14 December 2006
20:00

Rangers	0–1	South China
Louis Berty Mvoguele Ayock (yellow card) 17'; Lo Kwan Yee (yellow card) 23'; Godfred Karikari (yellow card) 36'; Alexandro Vieira Xavier (yellow card) 81'	(in Chinese)	Mihailo Jovanovic (yellow card) 41'; Deng Jinghuang (yellow card) 43'; Wong Chun Yue (yellow card) 45'; Detinho 48'

Mong Kok Stadium
Attendance: 1,550

=== Quarter-finals ===
23 December 2006
14:00

Xiangxue Sun Hei	2–1	Citizen
Lico 67'; Tse Man Wing (yellow card) 71'; Chung Kin Hei (yellow card) 78'; Colly Barnes Ezeh 78'	(in Chinese)	Festus Baise 90'; Festus Baise (yellow card) 90'

Mong Kok Stadium
Attendance: 901

23 December 2006
16:00

Wofoo Tai Po	0–1	Lanwa Redbull
	(in Chinese)	Ye Nan (yellow card) 34'; Lin Zhong (yellow card) 44'; Liu Jie (yellow card) 46'; Liu Jie 51'; Zhang Yu (yellow card) 62'; Liu Chong (yellow card) 74'

Mong Kok Stadium
Attendance: 901

24 December 2006
14:00

Kitchee	1–0	HKFC
Leung Chi Wing (yellow card) 55'; Julius Akosah (yellow card) 59'; Wilfed Bamnjo 90'	(in Chinese)	Hon Shing (yellow card) 22'; Michael Anthony Sealy (yellow card) 48'; Wong Yiu Fu (yellow card) 57'; Lai Chun Kit (yellow card) 59'; Lee Wai Tak (red card) 70'; Fung Hoi Man (yellow card) 90'

Mong Kok Stadium
Attendance: 3,945
Referee: Lam Shing Yan

24 December 2006
16:00

Happy Valley	2–2 (AET)	South China
Sham Kwok Keung 24'; Sui Weijie (yellow card) 50'; Engelbert Romaric Asse-Etoga (yellow card) 6' (yellow-red card) 74'; Fabricio Lopes Alcantara (yellow card) 84'; Gerard Ambassa (yellow card) 91'; Evanor (yellow card) 99'; Poon Man Tik 115'	(in Chinese)	Detinho (yellow card) 48' (yellow-red card) 83'; Man Pei Tak (yellow card) 62'; Cheng Siu Wai 78'; Li Haiqiang (yellow card) 89'; Wong Chun Yue 100'
Penalties
Gerard Ambassa (penalty scored); Feng Jizhi (penalty scored); Lee Sze Ming (penalty scored); Vandre Sagrillo Monteiro (penalty missed)	3–5	Mihailo Jovanovic (penalty scored); Tales Schutz (penalty scored); Chan Chi Hong (penalty scored); Bai He (penalty scored); Li Haiqiang (penalty scored)

Mong Kok Stadium
Attendance: 3,945
Referee: Fung Ka Yu

=== Semi-finals ===
14 January 2007
14:00

Kitchee	0–1	Xiangxue Sun Hei
Chan Siu Ki (yellow card) 52'; Tam Siu Wai (yellow card) 83'	(in Chinese)	Cristiano Cordeiro (yellow card) 33'; Lico 36'; Lee Wai Lun (yellow card) 29' (yellow-red card) 49'; Lee Kin Wo (yellow card) 55'; Marcio Anacleto (yellow card) 56'

Mong Kok Stadium
Attendance: 3,428

14 January 2007
16:00

South China	4–1	Lanwa Redbull
Kwok Kin Pong (yellow card) 25'; Li Haiqiang 27'; Au Wai Lun 51'; Tales Schutz (yellow card) 70'; Tales Schutz 71'; Yeung Ching Kwong 90'	(in Chinese)	Qi Zhongxi (yellow card) 25'; Zhang Yu (yellow card) 44'; Ye Nan (yellow card) 55'; Geng Xin (yellow card) 59'; You Long 77'; Zhu Xuyu (yellow card) 81'; Liu Chong (yellow card) 82'

Mong Kok Stadium
Attendance: 3,428

=== Final ===
21 January 2007
15:00

Xiangxue Sun Hei	1–2	South China
Lo Chi Kwan 40'; Lau Chi Keung (yellow card) 62'; Chung Kin Hei (yellow card) 90'; Marcio Gabriel Anacleto (yellow card) 90'	(in Chinese) at AFC	Mihailo Jovanovic (yellow card) 49'; Wong Chun Yue 69'; Detinho (yellow card) 86'; Bai He (yellow card) 87'; Tales Schutz 90' (pen.)

Hong Kong Stadium
Attendance: 4,980

== Scorers ==
2 goals

- (Hong Kong) Jaimes Mckee of HKFC
- (Brazil) Tales Schutz of South China
- (Hong Kong) Wong Chun Yue of South China
- (Brazil) Lico of Xiangxue Sun Hei

1 goal

- (Nigeria) Festus Baise of Citizen
- Tsang Kam To of Hong Kong 08
- (Hong Kong) Poon Man Tik of Happy Valley
- (Hong Kong) Sham Kwok Keung of Happy Valley
- (China) Liu Jie of Lanwa Redbull
- (China) You Long of Lanwa Redbull
- (Cameroon) Wilfed Bamnjo of Kitchee
- (Hong Kong) Au Wai Lun of South China
- (Hong Kong) Cheng Siu Wai of South China
- (Brazil) Detinho of South China
- Li Haiqiang of South China
- (Hong Kong) Yeung Ching Kwong of South China
- (Hong Kong) Barnes Colly Ezeh of Xiangxue Sun Hei
- (Hong Kong) Lo Chi Kwan of Xiangxue Sun Hei

== Prizes ==
=== Teamwise ===
- Champion (HKD$80,000): South China
- 1st-Runner-up (HKD$20,000): Xiangxue Sun Hei
- Knock-out in the Semi-Finals (HKD$10,000 each): Kitchee, Lanwa Redbull
- Knock-out in the Preliminary (HKD$5,000 each): HKFC, Hong Kong 08, Wofoo Tai Po, Happy Valley, Rangers, Citizen

=== Individual ===
- Top Scorer Award (HKD$5,000 shared among 4 people): Tales Schutz, Wong Chun Yue (South China), Lico (Xiangxue Sun Hei), Jaimes Mckee (HKFC)
- Best Defender Award (HKD$5,000): Cristiano Cordeiro (Xiangxue Sun Hei)

== See also ==
- Hong Kong Senior Shield
- The Hong Kong Football Association
- 2006-07 in Hong Kong football
- Hong Kong FA Cup 2006-07
- Hong Kong First Division League 2006-07
- Hong Kong League Cup 2006-07
