= 2003 Hong Kong–Macau Interport =

The 59th Hong Kong–Macau Interport was held in Hong Kong on 22 May 2004. It was originally scheduled to be held on 1 May 2003, but was postponed due to the outbreak of SARS. Hong Kong captured the championship by winning 6-0.

== Squads ==
=== Hong Kong ===
Hong Kong was represented by its youth team with age eligible to play for the 2008 Summer Olympics.

- Honorary Directors: Martin Hong, Lawrence Yu Kam-kee
- Coaches: Lai Sun Cheung, Tsang Wai Chung
- Goalkeeper Coach: Chu Kwok Kuen
- Administrator: Kwan Kon San
- Physio: Lui Yat Hong

No.	Pos.	Player	Date of birth (age)	Caps	Club
3	DF	Fung Kai Hong	25 January 1986 (age 18)		Hong Kong 08
4	DF	Chan Man Kin			Hong Kong 08
6	DF	Kwok Wing Lok	15 January 1986 (age 18)		Hong Kong 08
7	MF	Leung Chi Kei			Hong Kong 08
8	MF	Tong Kin Man	10 January 1985 (age 19)		(Hong Kong) Fukien
9	MF	Yip Chi Ho	21 October 1985 (age 18)		(Hong Kong) Rangers
10	MF	Leung Chun Pong	1 October 1986 (age 17)		Hong Kong 08
11	MF	Chan Kin On	15 July 1986 (age 17)		Hong Kong 08
13	DF	Yau Kam Leung	26 April 1985 (age 19)		Hong Kong 08
14	FW	Leung Tsz Chun	19 May 1985 (age 19)		(Hong Kong) South China
16	DF	Leung Kam Fai	17 July 1986 (age 17)		Hong Kong 08
19	GK	Tse Tak Him	10 February 1985 (age 19)		Hong Kong 08
20	DF	Wong Kin Wah			Hong Kong 08
23	MF	Kwok Kin Pong	30 March 1987 (age 17)		(Hong Kong) South China
24	FW	Cheng Lai Hin	31 March 1986 (age 18)		Hong Kong 08
25	MF	Chow Ka Wa	23 April 1986 (age 18)		Hong Kong 08
	GK	Ng Yat Hoi	6 November 1986 (age 17)		Hong Kong 08
	DF	Yau Ching On			Hong Kong 08
	FW	Sham Kwok Keung	10 September 1985 (age 18)		(Hong Kong) Happy Valley

=== Macau ===
Macau was represented by its youth team. The following only shows the players played in the match.

No.	Pos.	Player	Date of birth (age)	Caps	Club
3	DF	Lam Ka Pou			
4	DF	阮德恩			
5	DF	黃亨利			
6	MF	楊家俊			
7	MF	Chong Kun Kan			
8	MF	Geofredo Cheung	18 May 1979 (age 25)		
9	MF	Ian Chi Pang			
10	FW	Lei Fu Weng			
11	DF	Wong Kuok Leong			
12		李偉業			
13		U Heng			
15	DF	劉柏堅			
16	FW	Iek Kim Pang			
17		羅沙美基			
18	GK	Tam Heng Wa			

== Results ==
22 May 2004

Hong Kong	6 - 0	Macau
Leung Tsz Chun 2' 38' 78'; Yip Chi Ho 16'; Kwok Kin Pong 57'; Leung Chun Pong ?'	(Report) (in Chinese)

Mong Kok Stadium, Hong Kong
