= 2006–07 Hong Kong FA Cup =

Tournament details
- Country: Hong Kong

Final positions
- Champions: South China (9th title)
- Runners-up: Happy Valley

The 2006–07 Hong Kong FA Cup was the 33rd staging of the Hong Kong FA Cup. The competition started on 21 April 2007 with 10 Hong Kong First Division clubs. Four of them took part in the first round to determine which team advanced to the quarter-finals. From quarter finals onward, the cup competition was a single-elimination tournament.

Due to sponsorship deal with the Dongguan LANWA Group Co. Ltd, the event was officially known as 2006/07 HKFA Lanwa International FA Cup.

Although all the matches before the final was held at the Mongkok Stadium, the final was staged at the Hong Kong Stadium on 19 May 2007. South China defeated Happy Valley 3-1 in the final, to secure their ninth title and along with the domestic treble (Hong Kong First Division League champions, Hong Kong Senior Shield champions and the cup).

South China, as the winners of Hong Kong FA Cup, represented Hong Kong in the Barclays Asia Trophy 2007 in July and played against the Premier League teams Liverpool F.C., Portsmouth F.C. and Fulham F.C.

== Teams ==
- Citizen
- Happy Valley
- HKFC
- Hong Kong 08
- Kitchee
- Lanwa Redbull
- Rangers
- South China
- Wofoo Tai Po
- Xiangxue Sun Hei

== Fixtures and results ==
All times are Hong Kong Time (UTC+8).

=== Bracket ===
First round
Citizen	2
Lanwa Redbull	4
Wofoo Tai Po	0
South China	3

Quarter-finals
Happy Valley	4
Lanwa Redbull	0
Rangers	1
HKFC	0
Kitchee	2
Hong Kong 08	0
Xiangxue Sun Hei	1
South China	2

Semi-finals
Happy Valley	4
Rangers	0
Kitchee	2 (2)
South China (AET)	2 (4)

Final
Happy Valley	1
South China	3

Hong Kong FA Cup 2006–07 Winner

South China
9th Title

=== First round ===
2007-04-21
14:00

Citizen	2 – 4	Lanwa Redbull
Delphin 6'; Jorginho 81'	(Report)	Villalba 19' 61'; Lin Zhong 65'; Ye Nan 85'

Mong Kok Stadium
Attendance: 2,015

2007-04-21
16:00

Wofoo Tai Po	0 – 3	South China
	(Report)	Detinho 20'; Cleiton 22'; Schütz 86'

Mong Kok Stadium
Attendance: 2,015

=== Quarter-finals ===
2007-04-22
14:00

Rangers	1 – 0	HKFC
Fofo 53' (pen.)	(Report)

Mong Kok Stadium
Attendance: 412

2007-04-22
16:00

Kitchee	2 – 0	Hong Kong 08
Akosah 54' 78'	(Report)

Mong Kok Stadium
Attendance: 412

2007-05-05
14:00

Happy Valley	4 – 0	Lanwa Redbull
Juninho Petrolina 39'; Gerard 59' 71'; Law Chun Bong 90'	(Report)

Mong Kok Stadium
Attendance: 3,057

2007-05-05
16:00

Xiangxue Sun Hei	1 – 2	South China
Lo Chi Kwan 39'	(Report)	Schütz 40' 64'

Mong Kok Stadium
Attendance: 3,057

=== Semi-finals ===
2007-05-13
14:00

Happy Valley	4 – 0	Rangers
Sham Kwok Keung 8' 46'; Dênisson 72'; Law Chun Bong 90'	(Report)

Mong Kok Stadium
Attendance: 6,339

2007-05-13
16:00

South China	4 – 2 (a.e.t.)	Kitchee
Detinho 52'; Schütz 57' (pen.); Cheng Siu Wai 111' 120'	(Report)	Rakočević 45'; Chan Siu Ki 90'

Mong Kok Stadium
Attendance: 6,339

=== Final ===
2007-05-19
15:00

South China	3 – 1	Happy Valley
Detinho 22' (pen.); Chan Chi Hong 27'; Cheng Siu Wai 85'	(Report)	Poon Yiu Cheuk 48' (pen.)

Hong Kong Stadium
Attendance: 6,427
Referee: Mike Riley

== Top goalscorers ==
4 goals

- (Brazil) Tales Schutz of South China

3 goals

- (Hong Kong) Cheng Siu Wai of South China
- (Brazil) Detinho of South China

2 goals

- (Hong Kong) Gerard Ambassa Guy of Happy Valley
- (Hong Kong) Law Chun Bong of Happy Valley
- (Hong Kong) Sham Kwok Keung of Happy Valley
- (Cameroon) Julius Akosah of Kitchee
- (Paraguay) Aldo Villaba of Lanwa Redbull

1 goal

- (Senegal) Delphin Tshibanda Tshibangu of Citizen
- (Brazil) Jorginho of Citizen
- (Brazil) Denisson Ricardo De Souza of Happy Valley
- (Brazil) Hamilton Timbira Dias Dos Santos Junior of Happy Valley
- (Hong Kong) Poon Yiu Cheuk of Happy Valley
- (China) Ling Cong of Lanwa Redbull
- (China) Ye Nan of Lanwa Redbull
- (Hong Kong) Chan Siu Ki of Kitchee
- (Serbia) Darko Rakocevic of Kitchee
- (Ghana) Wisdom Fofo Agbo of Rangers
- (Brazil) Cleiton of South China
- (Hong Kong) Lo Chi Kwan of Xiangxue Sun Hei
- (Hong Kong) Chan Chi Hong of South China

== Prizes ==
=== Team awards ===
- Champion (HKD$80,000 + HKD$500,000 for the team to participate in Barclays Asia Trophy 2007): South China (9th title)

=== Individual awards ===
- Top Scorer (HKD$5,000): (Brazil) Tales Schutz of South China
- Best Defender (HKD$5,000): (Brazil) Denisson Ricardo De Souza of Happy Valley

== Trivia ==
- Happy Valley have been the 1st runner-up of FA Cup for the third consecutive season, they suffered their 8th loss in a row in cup finals of local competitions.

== See also ==
- Hong Kong FA Cup
- The Hong Kong Football Association
- 2006-07 in Hong Kong football
- Hong Kong First Division League 2006-07
- Hong Kong League Cup 2006-07
- Hong Kong Senior Shield 2006-07
- Barclays Asia Trophy 2007
