= 2006 Hong Kong–Macau Interport =

2006 football match between Hong Kong and Macau

The 62nd Hong Kong Macau Interport was held in Macau on 3 June 2006. The match ended with 0-0 and resulted in shared champions.

== Squads ==
=== Hong Kong ===
Hong Kong was represented by its under-23 team.

- Head Coach: Lai Sun Cheung

No.	Pos.	Player	Date of birth (age)	Caps	Club
	GK	Tse Tak Him	10 February 1985 (age 21)		(Hong Kong) Citizen
	GK	Ng Yat Hoi	6 November 1986 (age 19)		Hong Kong 08
	DF	Ho Min Tong	11 September 1985 (age 20)		Hong Kong 08
	DF	Sham Kwok Fai	30 May 1984 (age 22)		(Hong Kong) Happy Valley
	DF	Cheung Tsz Kin	26 March 1983 (age 23)		(Hong Kong) Kitchee
	DF	Cheung Wai Shing	18 February 1984 (age 22)		(Hong Kong) South China
	DF	Lai Ka Fai	30 May 1983 (age 23)		(Hong Kong) Citizen
	DF	Li Hang Wui	15 February 1985 (age 21)		(Hong Kong) Citizen
	DF	Tse Man Wing	5 January 1983 (age 23)		(Hong Kong) South China
	DF	Cheung Kin Fung	1 January 1984 (age 22)		(Hong Kong) Kitchee
	DF	Leung Kam Fai	17 July 1986 (age 19)		(Hong Kong) Happy Valley
	DF	Fung Kai Hong	25 January 1986 (age 20)		Hong Kong 08
	MF	Yip Chi Ho	21 October 1985 (age 20)		(Hong Kong) Buler Rangers
	MF	Wong Shun Him	12 June 1985 (age 20)		Hong Kong 08
	MF	Leung Chun Pong	1 October 1986 (age 19)		(Hong Kong) Citizen
	MF	Sham Kwok Keung	10 September 1985 (age 20)		(Hong Kong) Happy Valley
	MF	Lam Ka Wai	5 June 1985 (age 20)		(Hong Kong) Buler Rangers
	MF	Kwok Kin Pong	30 March 1987 (age 19)		(Hong Kong) South China
	MF	Li Ka Wing	8 April 1985 (age 21)		Hong Kong 08
	FW	Lo Kwan Yee	9 October 1984 (age 21)		(Hong Kong) Buler Rangers
	FW	Cheng Lai Hin	31 March 1986 (age 20)		Hong Kong 08
	FW	Chan Siu Ki	14 July 1985 (age 20)		(Hong Kong) Kitchee

=== Macau ===
The following shows part of the squad only.

No.	Pos.	Player	Date of birth (age)	Caps	Club
	GK	Domingos Chan	11 September 1970 (age 35)		(Hong Kong) Xiangxue Sun Hei

== Results ==
3 June 2006
16:00 UTC+8

Macau	0 - 0	Hong Kong
	(Report) (in Chinese)

Macau University of Science and Technology Sports Field, Macau
