= Casemiro Mior =

Brazilian footballer and manager (born 1958)

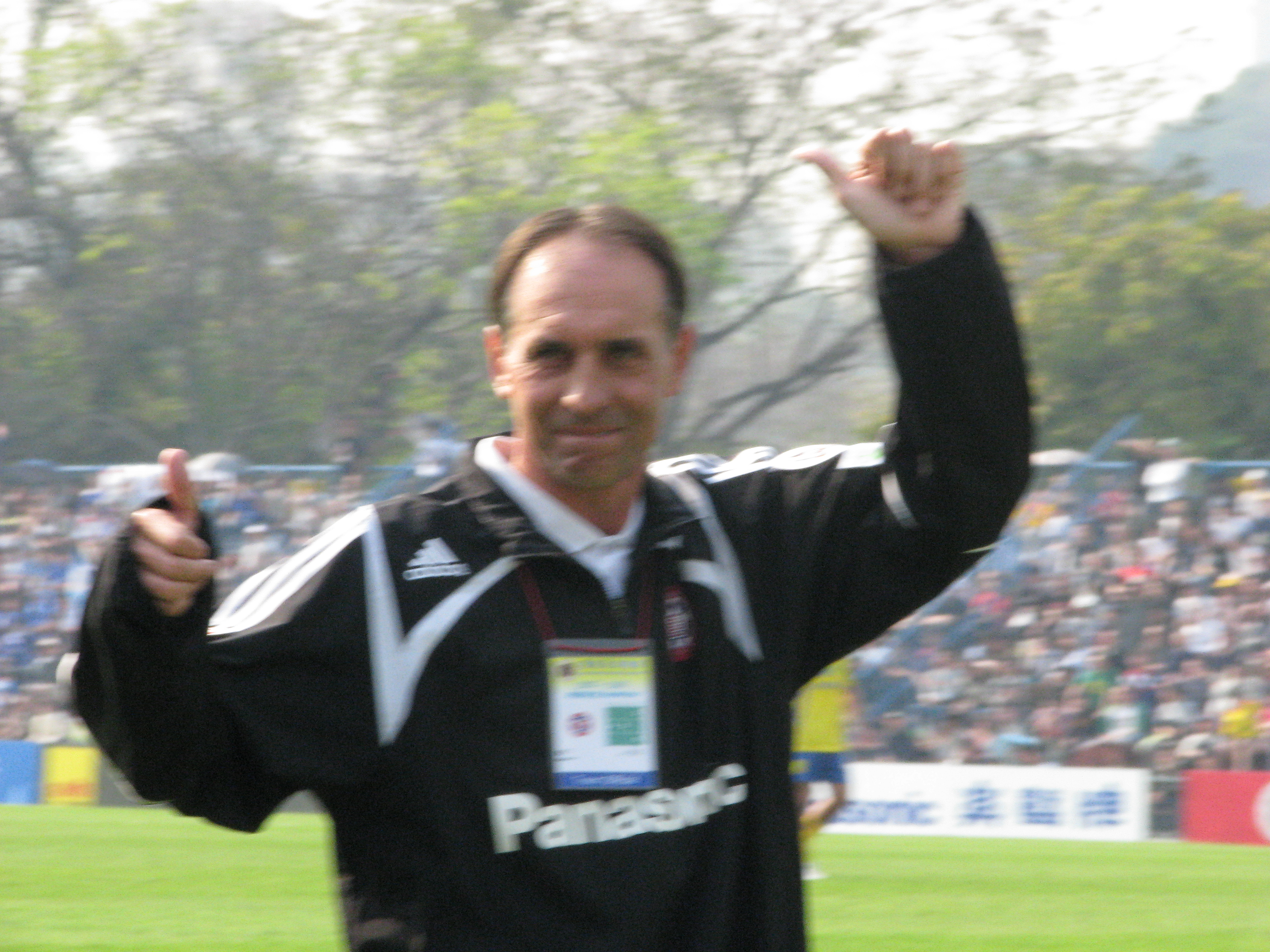
- Mior in 2008 as the manager of Eastern

Personal information
- Date of birth: January 12, 1958 (age 68)
- Place of birth: Porto Alegre, Rio Grande do Sul, Brazil

Senior career*
Years	Team	Apps	(Gls)
1979	Juventude	5	(0)
1980–1987	Gremio	379	(5)
1988–1989	Internacional	50	(0)
1990	Inter de Limeira	10	(0)
Total		444	(5)

Managerial career
- 1990: Inter de Limeira
- 1994: 15 de Novembro
- 1995: Guarany (BG)
- 1996: Brasil de Farroupilha
- 1996–1997: Deportivo Italchacao
- 1997–1998: Veranópolis
- 1998–2002: South China
- 2002: Hong Kong
- 2002–2003: Veranópolis
- 2003–2005: Nacional da Madeira
- 2005: Atlético Paranaense
- 2005–2006: Avaí
- 2006–2007: South China
- 2007–2008: Eastern
- 2008: Belenenses
- 2009: Fortaleza
- 2009–2010: Ypiranga
- 2015–2016: South China
- * Club domestic league appearances and goals

Casemiro Mior (born January 12, 1958) is a Brazilian former football manager and former footballer.

== Playing career ==
During his career as a footballer, he played for Grêmio, Internacional and Internacional de Limeira. He was sent off in the 1989 Grenal while he was playing with Internacional against Gremio.

== Managerial career ==
In 2002, Mior was appointed to be the head coach of Hong Kong. He coached C.D. Nacional of Portugal for two seasons, from 2003 to 2005. After that, he returned to his native Brazil to coach CA Paranaense and Avaí FC.

In 2007, Mior was appointed to be the head coach of Hong Kong League XI to compete in 2007 Lunar New Year Cup. The team finished last after losing both matches after penalty shootout.

At the end of the 2006-07 Hong Kong First Division League season, during which he led South China to the title, Casemiro Mior was awarded the Best Coach of the Year.

He was fired as coach of Portuguese Liga side Belenenses on 7 October 2008, after he only managed to get two points in five matches.

== Honours ==
=== Manager ===
Eastern

- Hong Kong Senior Shield: 2007–08

South China

- Hong Kong First Division: 1999–2000, 2006–07
- Hong Kong Senior Shield: 1998–99, 1999–2000, 2001–02, 2006–07
- Hong Kong FA Cup: 2006–07

=== Individual ===
Hong Kong First Division League Coach of the Year: 1999-00, 2001–02, 2006–07

Sporting positions
Preceded by Unknown	South China manager 1998-2002	Succeeded by Chan Kwok Hung; Ku Kam Fai
Preceded by Jorge Amaral	South China manager 2006-07	Succeeded by José Luis
