= João Miguel =

João Miguel may refer to:

- João Miguel (actor) (born 1970), Brazilian actor
- João Miguel (footballer) (born 1973), Brazilian footballer
- João Miguel Silva (footballer, born April 1995) (born 1995), Portuguese footballer
- João Miguel Xavier (born 1993), Portuguese footballer
