= Lo Yiu Hung =

Hong Kong footballer

Personal information
- Date of birth: 30 January 1978 (age 48)
- Place of birth: British Hong Kong
- Height: 1.76 m (5 ft 9 in)
- Position: Left-back

Senior career*
Years	Team	Apps	(Gls)
2002–2013	HKFC		
- * Club domestic league appearances and goals

Lo Yiu Hung (Chinese: 盧耀洪; born 30 January 1978) is a former Hong Kong professional footballer.

== Career statistics ==
=== Club ===
Appearances and goals by club, season and competition
Club	Season	League			Cup		League Cup		Other		Total	
Club	Season	Division	Apps	Goals	Apps	Goals	Apps	Goals	Apps	Goals	Apps	Goals
HKFC	2002–03	First Division	7	1	1 (Note: Appearances in the Hong Kong FA Cup)	0	0	0	1 (Note: Appearances in the Hong Kong Senior Shield)	0	9	1
HKFC	2006–07	First Division	10	0	0	0	0	0	0	0	10	0
HKFC	2010–11	First Division	13	2	0	0	0	0	1	0	14	2
HKFC	Total		30	3	1	0	0	0	2	0	33	3
