= Ivan Jević =

Serbian footballer

Personal information
- Date of birth: 23 July 1975 (age 51)
- Place of birth: Belgrade, SFR Yugoslavia
- Height: 1.83 m (6 ft 0 in)
- Position: Centre back

Team information
- Current team: Tobol (assistant coach)

Senior career*
Years	Team	Apps	(Gls)
2000–2001	Hajduk Beograd	16	(1)
2000–2001	→ Padinska Skela (loan)		
2001–2003	Javor Ivanjica	30	(5)
2003–2004	Alania Vladikavkaz	20	(0)
2005–2008	Kitchee	47	(0)
2009	Radnički Beograd		
2009–2014	Brodarac		

Managerial career
- 2016–2017: Brodarac (U19)
- 2017: Radnički Niš
- 2018: Serbia U17
- 2018–2019: Serbia U18
- 2019: Serbia U19
- 2021: OFK Titograd
- 2021–2022: Dinamo Samarqand (assistant)
- 2022: Shakhtyor Soligorsk (assistant)
- 2023–: Tobol (assistant)
- * Club domestic league appearances and goals

Ivan Jević (Serbian Cyrillic: Иван Јевић; born 23 July 1975) is a Serbian professional football coach and a former player who played as a defender. He is an assistant coach with the Kazakhstani club Tobol.

== Honours ==
Kitchee

- Hong Kong League Cup: 2005–06
- Hong Kong Senior Shield: 2005–06

Individual

- Hong Kong Senior Shield Best Defender: 2005–06

== Career statistics ==
Club	Season	League		Cup		—		—		—		Total	
Club	Season	Apps	Goals	Apps	Goals	Apps	Goals	Apps	Goals	Apps	Goals	Apps	Goals
Spartak-Alania	2003	20	0	?	0	—	—	—	—	—	—	?	0
Spartak-Alania	2004	0	0	?	?	—	—	—	—	—	—	?	?
Spartak-Alania	Total	20	0										
Club	Season	League		League Cup		Senior Shield		FA Cup		AFC Cup		Total	
Club	Season	Apps	Goals	Apps	Goals	Apps	Goals	Apps	Goals	Apps	Goals	Apps	Goals
Kitchee	2005–06	?	0	?	0	?	1	?	0	—	—	?	1
Kitchee	2006–07	?	0	—	—	1	0	—	—	—	—	?	0
Kitchee	Total		0			—	—	—	—	—	—		1
Career Total													

Sporting positions
Preceded by Chan Siu Ki	Kitchee SC captain January 2008 – July 2008	Succeeded by Leung Chi Wing
Awards and achievements
Preceded by Fan Chun Yip	Hong Kong Senior Shield Best Defensive Player; 2005–06	Succeeded by Cristiano Cordeiro
