= Yau Kam Leung =

Hong Kong footballer

Yau Kam Leung 游錦良
Personal information
- Full name: Yau Kam Leung
- Date of birth: 26 April 1985 (age 41)
- Place of birth: Hong Kong
- Height: 1.71 m (5 ft 7 in)
- Position: Left back

Youth career
- Citizen AA

Senior career*
| Years | Team | Apps | (Gls) |
| 2003–2006 | Citizen AA | 3 | (0) |
| 2004–2005 | → Xiangxue Pharmaceutical (loan) | 3 | (1) |
| 2006–2007 | Hong Kong 08 | 14 | (0) |
| 2007–2008 | Shatin | 32 | (0) |
| 2008–2012 | Rangers | 15 | (1) |
| 2012–2013 | Yuen Long | 5 | (0) |
| 2020–2021 | Yau Tsim Mong | 5 | (0) |
| 2023 | Fu Moon | | |
| 2023–2024 | Mutual | | |
| 2025– | Ornament | | |
- * Club domestic league appearances and goals

Yau Kam Leung (Chinese: 游錦良; Jyutping: jau^{4} gam^{2} loeng^{4}, born 26 April 1985, in Hong Kong) is a former professional football player. He plays as a left-back.
