= Vítor Hugo (footballer, born 1981) =

Brazilian footballer

Personal information
- Full name: Vítor Hugo Manique de Jesus
- Date of birth: 3 November 1981 (age 44)
- Place of birth: Porto Alegre, Brazil
- Height: 1.90 m (6 ft 3 in)
- Position: Forward

Senior career*
Years	Team	Apps	(Gls)
2003	Novo Hamburgo		
2003	Altay Constanța		
2004	Inter de Lages		
2004	Atlético Universidad		
2005	Real Brasil		
2006	Pelotas		
2006	Happy Valley	6	(1)
2006	Xiangxue Sun Hei	3	(1)
2007	Veranópolis		
2007	Sport Recife	2	(0)
2007	Partizan	2	(0)
2008	Cienciano	2	(0)
2009	Caxias do Sul		
2009	América de Natal	1	(0)
2010	Inter de Santa Maria		
2010	Al Nahda		(1)
2011	Manama		
2012	Guarani de Venâncio Aires		
2013	Celaya	2	(0)
- * Club domestic league appearances and goals

Vítor Hugo Manique de Jesus (born 3 November 1981), or simply Vítor Hugo, is a Brazilian former professional footballer who played as a forward. A journeyman, Vítor Hugo started his professional career in his homeland and also played for numerous clubs in Romania, Peru, Hong Kong, Serbia, Oman, Bahrain and Mexico.

== Career ==
Born in Porto Alegre, Vítor Hugo started his football career with Novo Hamburgo. In September 2003, he moved to Romanian club Altay Constanța, playing in the lower league. In 2004, he spent some time playing with Inter de Lages, before moving abroad again to play with Atlético Universidad of the Peruvian Primera División.

In 2006, Vítor Hugo was playing with Pelotas, but in the middle of the year he joined his fellow Brazilian coach José Ricardo Rambo at Happy Valley in Hong Kong. He also played with Xiangxue Sun Hei during the 2006–07 Hong Kong First Division League.

In 2007, Vítor Hugo returned to Brazil by signing with Veranópolis. He was the top scorer of the Campeonato Gaúcho with 13 goals. He then signed with Sport Recife, making his debut in the Campeonato Brasileiro Série A.

In July 2007, Vítor Hugo joined Serbian side Partizan, but he left the club during the winter break. He then moved to Peruvian club Cienciano, playing with them in the 2008 Copa Libertadores.

Vítor Hugo also appeared in the 2009 Campeonato Brasileiro Série B with América de Natal, previously joining them from Caxias do Sul.

In 2010, after a short spell with Inter de Santa Maria in the Campeonato Gaúcho, Vítor Hugo moved abroad again, this time signing with Omani League side Al Nahda, playing in the 2010 AFC Cup group stage. Afterwards, he moved to play with Manama of the Bahraini Premier League.

Vítor Hugo returned to Brazil once again by joining Guarani de Venâncio Aires for the 2012 season. His next club was Celaya of the Ascenso MX, making two appearances in the 2013 Clausura.
