= Tales Schütz =

Brazilian footballer (born 1981)

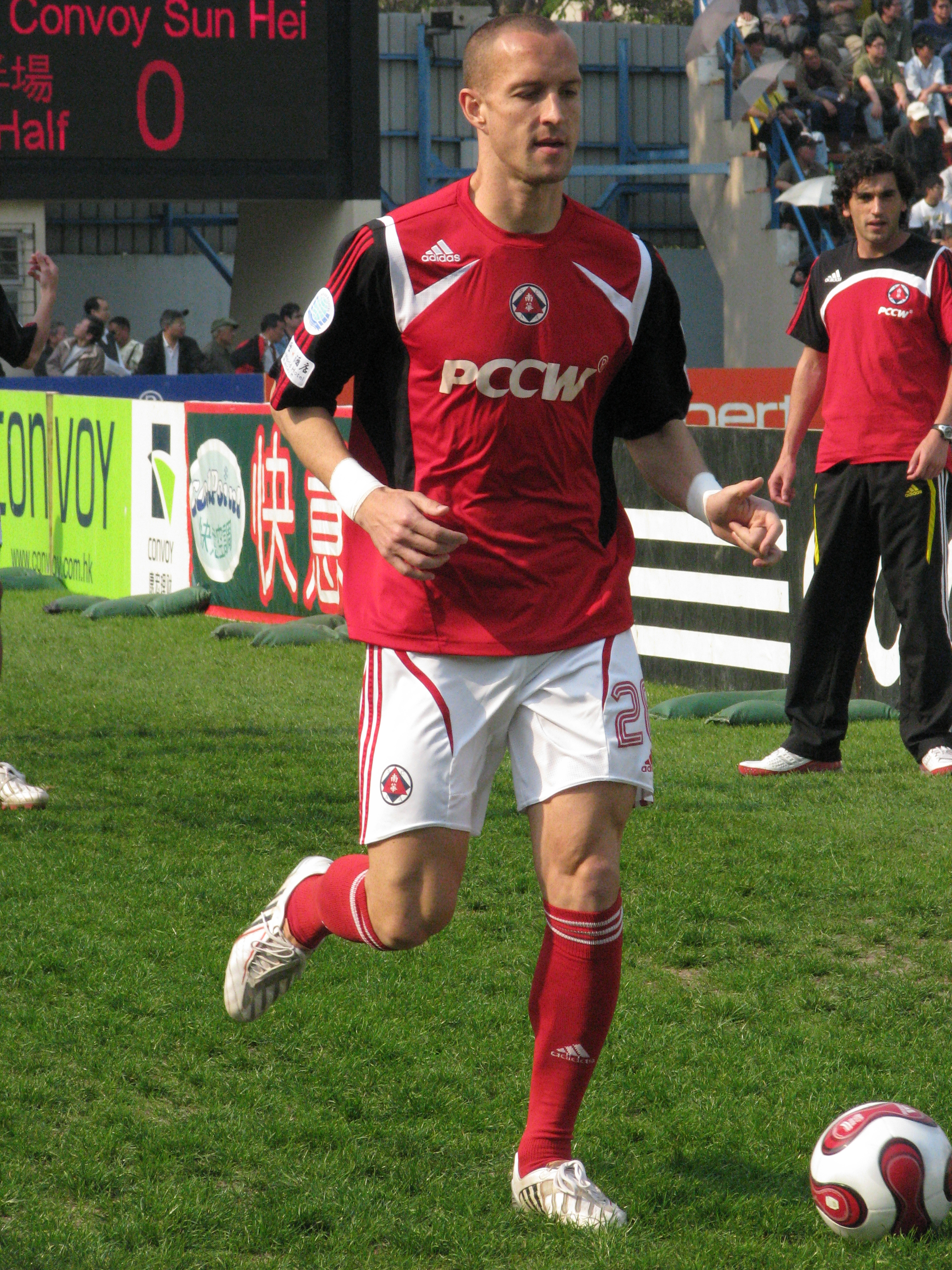

Personal information
- Full name: Tales Schütz
- Date of birth: 22 August 1981 (age 45)
- Place of birth: Porto Alegre, Brazil
- Height: 1.87 m (6 ft 2 in)
- Positions: Striker; left winger

Senior career*
| Years | Team | Apps | (Gls) |
| 2001–2004 | Botafogo | 0 | (0) |
| 2002 | → Atlético Paranaense (loan) | 0 | (0) |
| 2002 | → Ashdod (loan) | 0 | (0) |
| 2002–2003 | → Maccabi Netanya (loan) | 9 | (2) |
| 2003–2004 | → Akratitos (loan) | 2 | (0) |
| 2004 | Cianorte | 1 | (0) |
| 2004–2005 | Jagiellonia Białystok | 8 | (2) |
| 2005 | Atlético Juventus | 0 | (0) |
| 2005–2008 | Grêmio Inhumense | 6 | (1) |
| 2006–2007 | → South China (loan) | 18 | (17) |
| 2007–2008 | → Leixões (loan) | 10 | (0) |
| 2008–2011 | South China | 51 | (23) |
| 2011–2012 | Azal | 22 | (10) |
| 2012–2013 | Inter Baku | 10 | (0) |
| 2013–2014 | Hong Kong Rangers | 12 | (5) |
| 2015 | São José | 5 | (0) |
- * Club domestic league appearances and goals

Tales Schütz (born 22 August 1981) is a Brazilian former professional footballer who played as a striker.

== Club career ==
Schütz started his career his Brazilian club Botafogo before loan spells at Atlético Paranaense, Ashdod and Maccabi Netanya in Israel and Akratitos in Greece. Schütz also had a brief spell playing in Poland for Jagiellonia Białystok.

=== Hong Kong ===
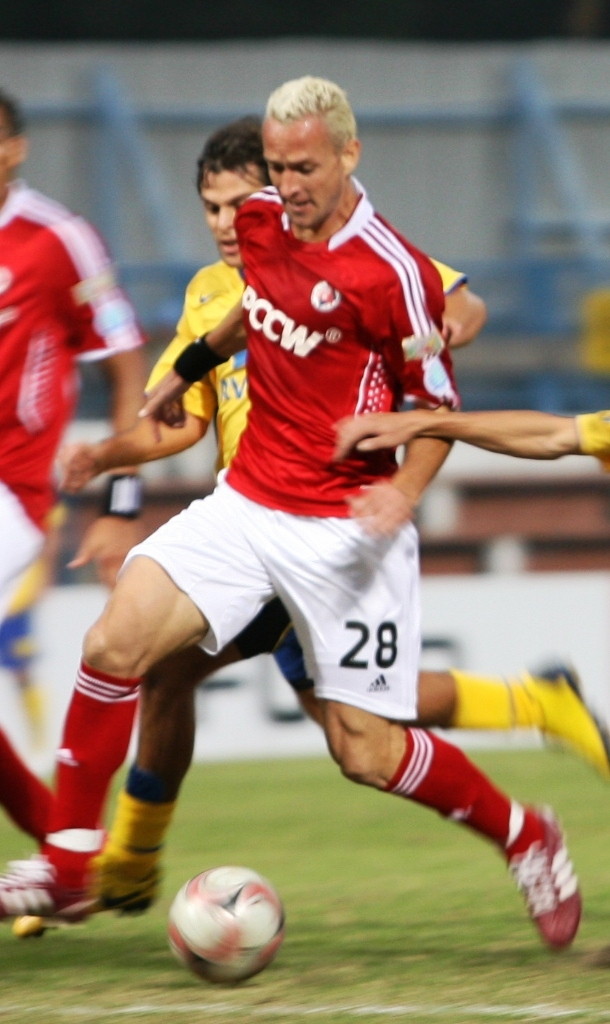
Tales Schütz

On 14 August 2006, Schütz went on loan to Hong Kong First Division League club South China for the 2006–07 season. During his first season in Hong Kong, he obtained 3 out of the 4 Top Scorer Awards in local competition, including the main Hong Kong First Division League Top Scorer Award. He wore the No. 28 jersey in South China which represents the date on which he first met his wife. In January 2008, Schütz signed permanently on a four-year contract with South China for a transfer fee of more than HK $1 million, a record breaking fee for Hong Kong. Schutz returned to Brazil in early 2011 for injury treatment before not having his contract renewed by South China in the summer.

=== Azerbaijan ===
Following his release in the summer of 2011, Schütz moved to Azerbaijan Premier League side AZAL. After one season with AZAL, scoring 10 goals in 23 games, Schütz moved to fellow Baku based team Inter Baku where he scored twice in 15 games, both of which came in their Second qualifying round matches against Asteras Tripolis of Greece.

=== Return to Hong Kong ===
After being released by Inter Baku, Schütz signed with Rangers on 19 September 2013.

== Career statistics ==
=== Club ===
As of 2 July 2014

Club statistics
| Season | Club | League | League | | Cup | | League Cup | | Continental | | Other | | Total | |
| Season | Club | League | App | Goals | App | Goals | App | Goals | App | Goals | App | Goals | App | Goals |
| Hong Kong | | | League | | FA Cup | | League Cup | | Asia | | Senior Shield | | Total | |
|---|---|---|---|---|---|---|---|---|---|---|---|---|---|---|
| 2006–07 | South China | Hong Kong First Division League | 18 | 17 | 4 | 4 | 4 | 1 | - | | 4 | 2 | 30 | 24 |
| 2007–08 | South China | Hong Kong First Division League | 7 | 4 | 1 | 0 | 5 | 3 | 5 | 1 | 0 | 0 | 18 | 8 |
| 2008–09 | South China | Hong Kong First Division League | 20 | 6 | 2 | 0 | 0 | 0 | 6 | 3 | 2 | 1 | 30 | 8 |
| 2010–11 | South China | Hong Kong First Division League | 14 | 8 | 1 | 0 | 0 | 0 | 3 | 2 | | 2 | 18 | 11 |
| 2009–10 | South China | Hong Kong First Division League | 10 | 5 | | | | | | | | | 10 | 5 |
| Azerbaijan | | | League | | Azerbaijan Cup | | League Cup | | Europe | | Azerbaijan Supercup | | Total | |
| 2011–12 | AZAL | Azerbaijan Premier League | 22 | 10 | 1 | 0 | - | | 0 | 0 | - | | 23 | 10 |
| 2012–13 | Inter Baku | Azerbaijan Premier League | 10 | 0 | 1 | 0 | - | | 4 | 2 | - | | 15 | 2 |
| Hong Kong | | | League | | FA Cup | | League Cup | | Asia | | Senior Shield | | Total | |
| 2013–14 | Rangers | Hong Kong First Division League | 15 | 5 | 1 | 0 | 2 | 1 | | | | | 18 | 6 |
| Total | Hong Kong | | 84 | 45 | 9 | 4 | 11 | 5 | 14 | 6 | 6 | 5 | 124 | 65 |
| Total | Azerbaijan | | 32 | 10 | 2 | 0 | - | | 4 | 2 | 0 | 0 | 38 | 12 |
| Career total | | | 116 | 55 | 11 | 4 | 11 | 5 | 18 | 8 | 6 | 5 | 162 | 77 |

== Honours ==
South China

- Hong Kong First Division League: 2006–07, 2007–08, 2008–09, 2009–10
- Hong Kong Senior Shield: 2006–07, 2009–10

Awards and achievements
| Preceded by Keith Gumbs | Hong Kong Senior Shield Top Scorer Award (with Wong Chun Yue, Lico, Jaimes McKee); 2006–07 | Succeeded by Rodrigo |
| Preceded by Lico | Hong Kong FA Cup top scorer 2006–07 | Succeeded by Giovane; Chen Zhizhao |
| Preceded by Fábio; Clodoaldo de Oliveira | Hong Kong First Division League top scorer 2006–07 | Succeeded by Detinho |
