= Fung Kai Hong =

Hong Kong footballer

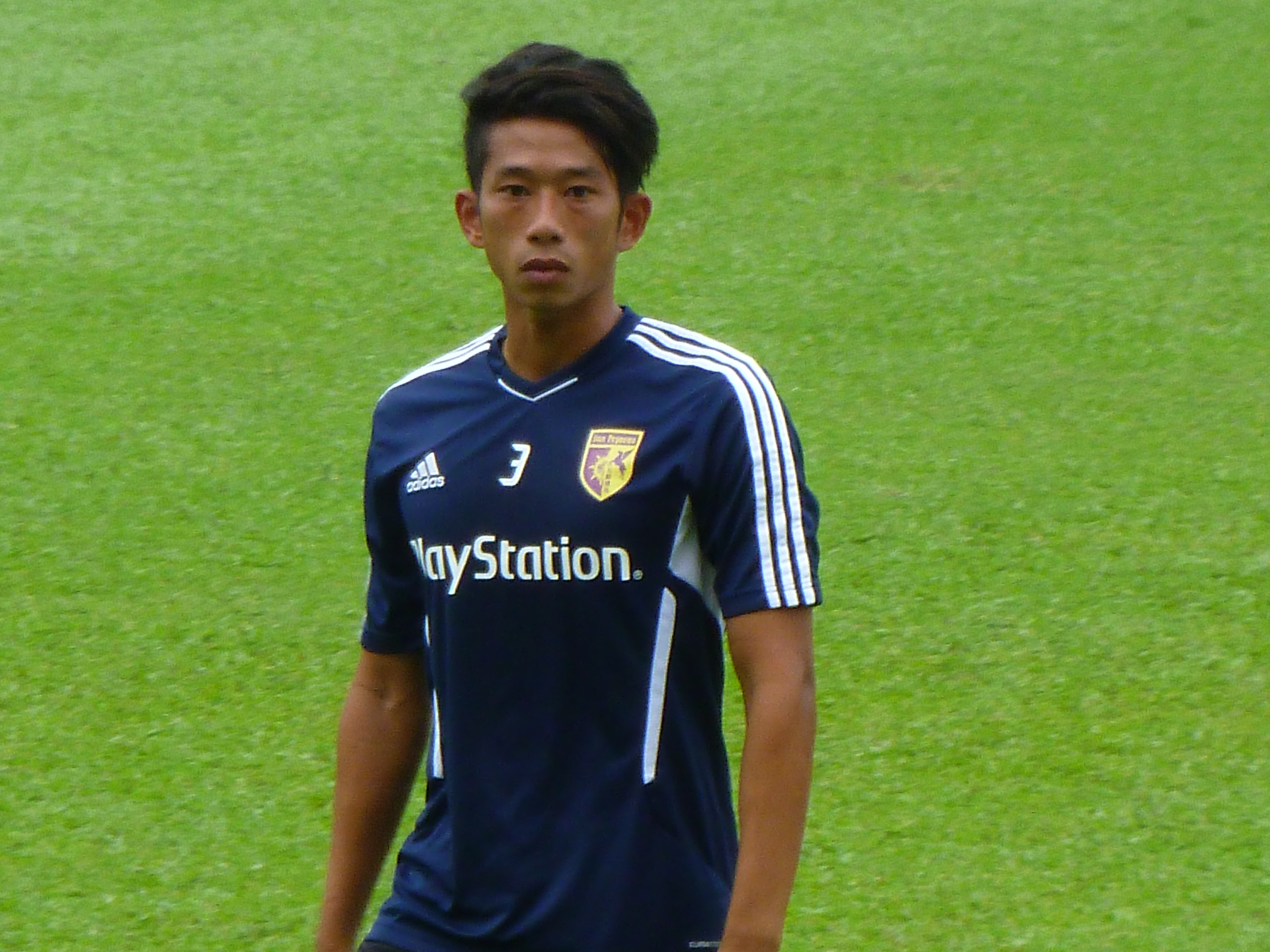

Personal information
- Full name: Fung Kai Hong
- Date of birth: 25 January 1986 (age 40)
- Place of birth: Hong Kong
- Height: 1.78 m (5 ft 10 in)
- Position: Defender

Senior career*
Years	Team	Apps	(Gls)
2004–2005	Fukien	5	(0)
2005–2007	Hong Kong 08	28	(0)
2007–2012	Citizen	63	(1)
2012–2013	Pegasus	3	(0)
2013–2015	Yuen Long	17	(0)
2015–2016	Wong Tai Sin	6	(0)
2016–2017	Kwai Tsing	25	(0)
2017–2021	Citizen	67	(3)
2021–2022	Wong Tai Sin	17	(0)
2022–2025	Wing Go	49	(0)

International career^{‡}
2010	Hong Kong	2	(0)
Medal record
Representing Hong Kong
East Asian Games
Gold medal – first place	2009 Hong Kong	Football
- * Club domestic league appearances and goals as of 1 January 2025 ‡ National team caps and goals as of 23:02, 15 June 2011 (UTC)

Fung Kai Hong
- Chinese: 馮啟匡
Transcriptions
Standard Mandarin
- Hanyu Pinyin: Feng Qikuang
Yue: Cantonese
- Jyutping: fung^{4} kai^{2} hong^{1}

Fung Kai Hong (born 25 January 1986) is a former Hong Kong professional footballer who played as a defender.

== Club career ==
Fung made his professional debut for Citizen when he played in Round 2, 1–0 loss to South China in the 2009–10 season. His first goal for the club, came later that season, when he netted in Citizen's 3–1 victory over Shatin.

Fung joined Pegasus in July 2012 after being released by Citizen. However, he was again released by the club after spending one season with them. He joined newly promoted side Yuen Long on 17 June 2013.

== International career ==
Fung has represented the Hong Kong national team on two separate occasions, against Bahrain, and once against Yemen, both during qualification for the 2011 Asian Cup, in which Hong Kong failed to qualify for, finishing last in their group.
