= Kyle Jordan =

English footballer

Personal information
- Full name: Kyle Jordan
- Date of birth: 15 September 1988 (age 38)
- Position: Forward

Youth career
- Sheffield Wednesday

Senior career*
Years	Team	Apps	(Gls)
2006–2007	Xiangxue Sun Hei		
2007–2009	Worksop Town		
2011–2012	Sheffield		
2012–2013	Shirebrook Town		
2013–2020	Worksop Town		
2020	Handsworth		

Managerial career
- 2019–2020: Worksop Town (player-manager)
- * Club domestic league appearances and goals

Kyle Jordan (born 15 September 1988) is an English footballer.

== Career ==
Jordan started his career with Sheffield Wednesday, making numerous reserve team appearances as well as scoring for the first team in a friendly against Burton Albion.

He left the Owls in September 2006 to sign for Xiangxue Sun Hei in the Hong Kong First Division League (which at the time was a fully professional league sitting at the top of the Hong Kong football league system). He was an integral part of their squad, and scored on his debut for the club in a 2–2 draw with South China AA

After his year in Hong Kong, Jordan signed for Worksop Town, and subsequently played for Sheffield F.C. and Shirebrook Town, before returning to Worksop in 2013.
