= Leung Kam Fai =

Hong Kong footballer (born 1986)

Leung Kam Fai 梁金輝
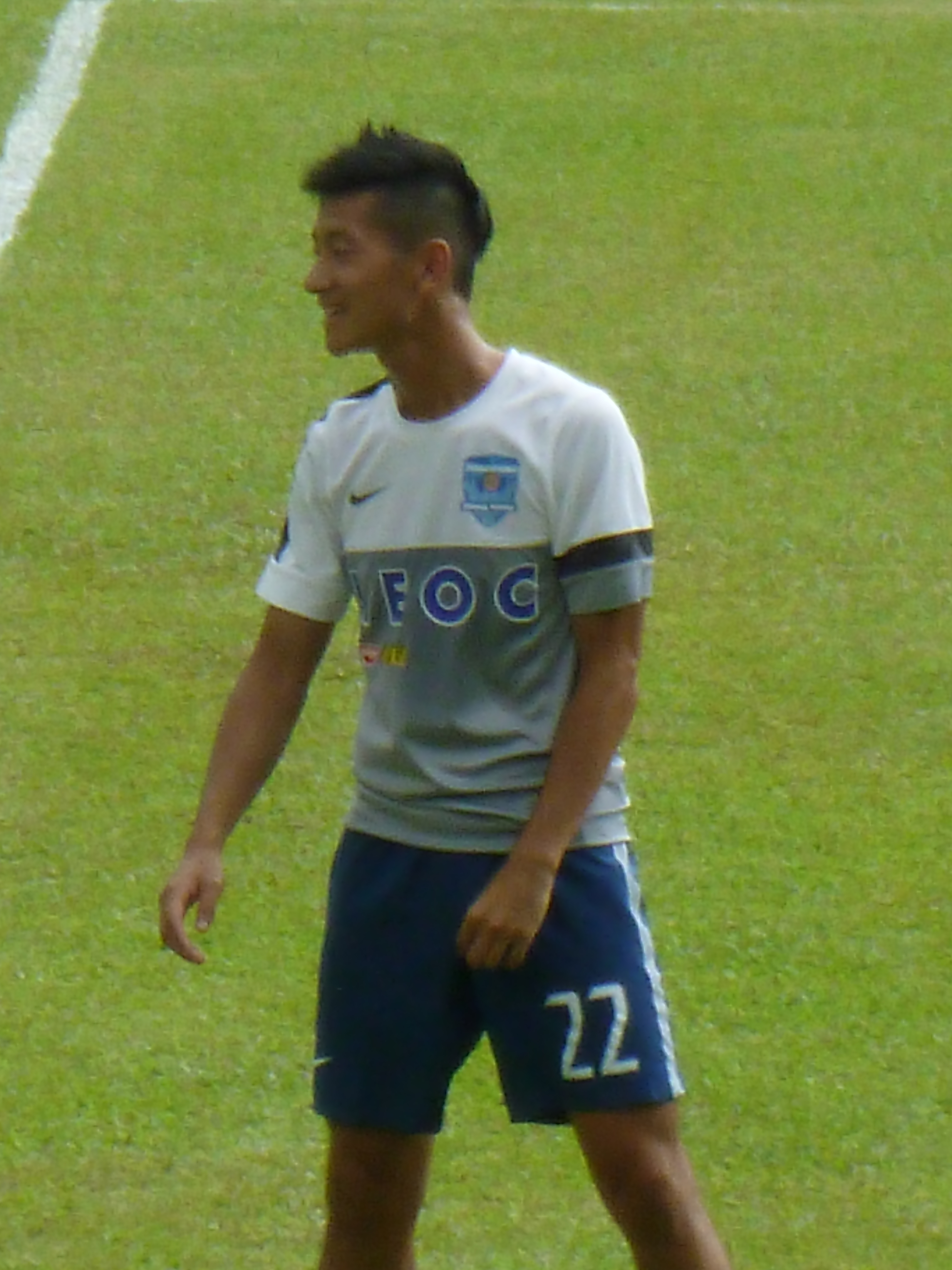

Personal information
- Full name: Leung Kam Fai
- Date of birth: 17 July 1986 (age 40)
- Place of birth: Hong Kong
- Height: 1.80 m (5 ft 11 in)
- Position: Defender

Youth career
- Rangers

Senior career*
Years	Team	Apps	(Gls)
2004–2005	Hong Kong 08		
2005	→ Xiangxue Pharmaceutical (loan)		
2005–2006	Happy Valley	6	(0)
2006–2008	Tai Po	25	(1)
2008–2010	Shatin	36	(8)
2012–2013	Mutual		
2013–2014	Yokohama FC Hong Kong	3	(0)
2014–2015	Southern	17	(4)
2015–2016	Wan Chai	21	(0)

International career
2007	Hong Kong U-23	1	(0)
- * Club domestic league appearances and goals

Leung Kam Fai (Chinese: 梁金輝; Jyutping: loeng^{4} gam^{1} fai^{1}, born 17 July 1986 in Hong Kong) is a former Hong Kong professional footballer who played as a defender.
