= Fabrício Lopes =

Brazilian footballer (born 1984)

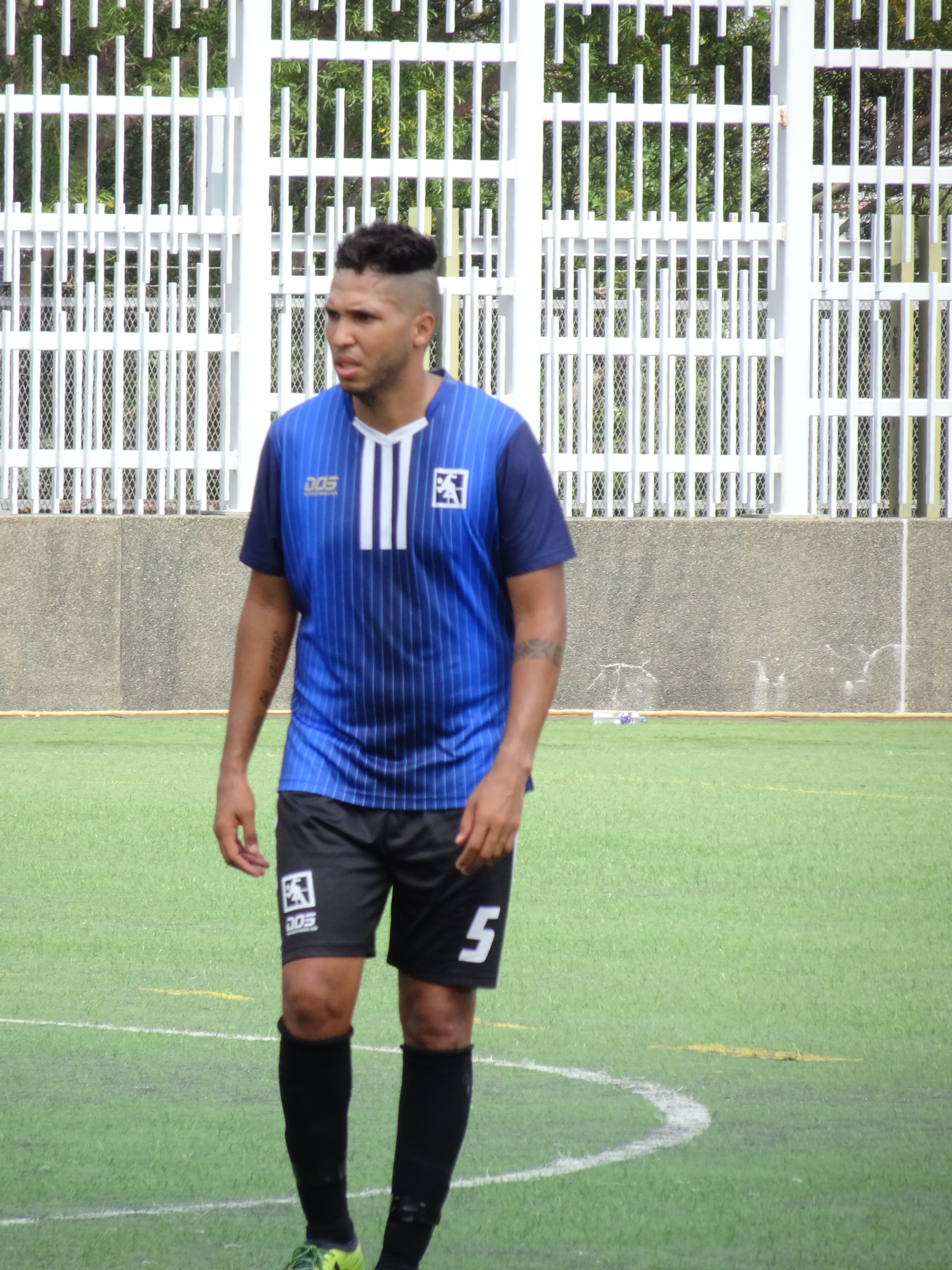

Personal information
- Full name: Fabrício Lopes Alcântara
- Date of birth: 18 May 1984 (age 42)
- Place of birth: Salvador, Bahia, Brazil
- Height: 1.88 m (6 ft 2 in)
- Position: Defender

Youth career
- 1996–2000: Vitória
- 2001: Cruzeiro
- 2001–2002: Corinthians

Senior career*
Years	Team	Apps	(Gls)
2001–2002	São Gonçalo		
2002–2005	Al-Ittihad Tripoli		
2005–2006	Al-Ain		
2006–2007	Happy Valley	6	(1)
2007–2009	Naval 1º	17	(0)
2009	Sha Tin	3	(0)
2010	Brasiliense		
2010–2011	América Mineiro	5	(1)
2011–2012	Arapongas		
2012–2013	Sampaio	1	(0)
2013	Rio Verde–GO	3	(0)
2013	Vasas	3	(0)
2015–2018	Sha Tin	63	(14)
2018–2019	Rangers (HKG)	1	(0)
2018–2019	→ Sha Tin (loan)	20	(6)
- * Club domestic league appearances and goals as of 9 September 2018

Fabrício Lopes Alcântara (Chinese: 盧比斯; born 18 May 1984) is a former Brazilian professional footballer who played as a defender.

== Personal ==
Fábricio Lopes has two brothers, who are both professional footballers. His older brother, Fábio Lopes, played for Hong Kong First Division clubs Happy Valley and Eastern. Also, Fabrício was a teammate of Fábio for Hong Kong First Division club Happy Valley during 2006–07.

His younger brother, Fernando Lopes, is currently playing for Rangers (HKG).

== Position ==
Fabricio Lopes can play as defensive midfielder or central defender.

== Honours ==
=== Club ===
With Happy Valley

- Hong Kong First Division League: 2005–06
