= Darko Rakočević =

Serbian footballer

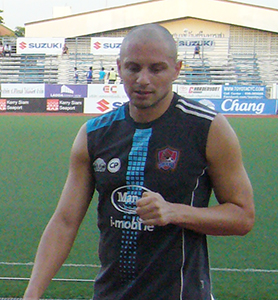
- Rakočević with Songkhla United in 2013

Personal information
- Full name: Darko Rakočević
- Date of birth: 13 September 1981 (age 45)
- Place of birth: Gornji Milanovac, SFR Yugoslavia
- Height: 1.86 m (6 ft 1 in)
- Position: Defender

Senior career*
Years	Team	Apps	(Gls)
2001	Metalac Gornji Milanovac		
2002	Polet Ljubić	13	(0)
2002–2005	Borac Čačak	34	(0)
2003–2004	→ Remont Čačak (loan)	13	(0)
2006–2007	Kitchee	18	(1)
2007	Metalac Gornji Milanovac	13	(0)
2008	Kairat	23	(1)
2009–2010	Metalac Gornji Milanovac	46	(3)
2011–2012	Chonburi		
2012	→ Wuachon United (loan)		
2013–2014	Songkhla United	46	(3)
2016	Mladost Lučani	15	(0)
Total		221	(8)

Managerial career
- 2021: Mladost Lučani
- 2022–2025: Borac Čačak
- 2025–2026: FAP
- * Club domestic league appearances and goals

Darko Rakočević (Serbian Cyrillic: Дарко Ракочевић; born 13 September 1981) is a Serbian football manager and former footballer who played as a defender.

== Career ==
After playing for Borac Čačak in the First League of Serbia and Montenegro, Rakočević moved abroad to Asia and signed for Kitchee in early 2006. He spent one and a half seasons in Hong Kong, before returning to his homeland and rejoining his former club Metalac Gornji Milanovac in the summer of 2007.

In 2008, Rakočević played for Kazakhstan Premier League club Kairat. He returned to Metalac Gornji Milanovac in early 2009, spending there the next two years. In early 2011, Rakočević moved abroad for the third time and joined Thai club Chonburi. He also played for Songkhla United in 2013 and 2014.
