= João Miguel (footballer) =

Brazilian footballer (born 1973)

Personal information
- Full name: João Miguel Pinto da Silva
- Date of birth: August 3, 1973 (age 53)
- Place of birth: Porto Alegre, Rio Grande do Sul, Brazil
- Height: 1.86 m (6 ft 1 in)
- Position: Defender

Team information
- Current team: Convoy Sun Hei
- Number: 23

Senior career*
Years	Team	Apps	(Gls)
?–2006	Porto Alegre	?	(?)
2006–present	Convoy Sun Hei	?	(3)
- * Club domestic league appearances and goals as of April 26, 2008

João Miguel Pinto da Silva (Chinese: 米基爾 Miguel; born August 3, 1973) is a Brazilian footballer. He plays for the Hong Kong team Convoy Sun Hei.
