= Leung Chi Wing =

Hong Kong footballer and coach

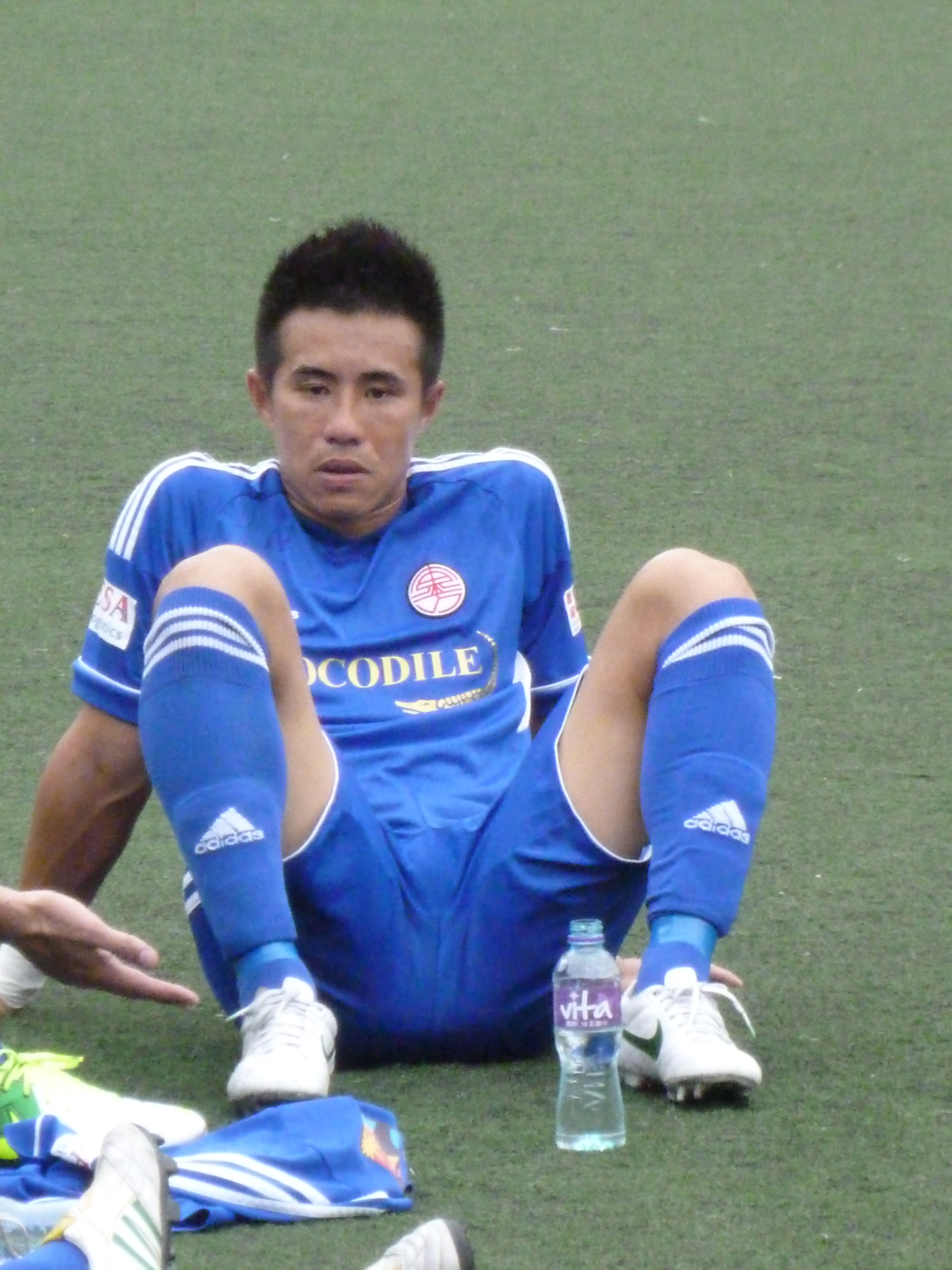

Personal information
- Full name: Leung Chi Wing
- Date of birth: 29 April 1978 (age 48)
- Place of birth: Hong Kong
- Height: 1.68 m (5 ft 6 in)
- Position: Left back

Youth career
- 1990–1996: Hong Kong Sports Institute

Senior career*
Years	Team	Apps	(Gls)
1996–1997	Happy Valley		
1997–1998	Rangers (HKG)		
1998–2000	South China		
2000–2001	Yee Hope		
2001	Mutual		
2002–2003	Buler Rangers	9	(0)
2003–2006	Sun Hei	30	(1)
2006–2009	Kitchee	39	(0)
2010	North District		
2011–2012	Tai Chung	15	(0)
2012–2015	Eastern	41	(0)
2015–2016	Sun Source	19	(4)
2016–2017	Metro Gallery	10	(0)
2017–2021	Wing Yee	40	(1)
2022–2023	St. Joseph's	7	(0)
2023–2024	Double Flower	11	(2)

International career^{‡}
1998–2006	Hong Kong	19	(0)

Managerial career
- 2015–2016: Dreams Metro Gallery
- 2016–2017: R&F (assistant coach)
- 2017–2019: Dreams FC
- 2019–2023: Kitchee (assistant director of football)
- 2023–2024: North District
- * Club domestic league appearances and goals ‡ National team caps and goals as of 21 March 2008

Leung Chi Wing (Chinese: 梁志榮; Jyutping: loeng^{4} zi^{3} wing^{4}; born 29 April 1978) is a former Hong Kong professional footballer and a current football coach.

== Coaching career ==
On 14 August 2016, Leung was hired as assistant coach by R&F ahead of their inaugural HKPL season.

On 10 June 2017, Leung left R&F to become the head coach of Dreams FC.

On 11 August 2019, Leung was appointed as the Assistant Director of Football at Kitchee.

On 10 July 2023, Leung was appointed as the head coach of North District.

== Honours ==
Kitchee

- Hong Kong League Cup: 2006–07

Sporting positions
Preceded by Ivan Jević	Kitchee SC captain July 2008 – July 2009	Succeeded by Lo Kwan Yee
Awards and achievements
Preceded by Wai Kun Lung; Yui Hok Man	Hong Kong First Division League Best Youth Player Award; 1997–1998 with Kwok Man Tik	Succeeded by Poon Yiu Cheuk; Chan Ka Ki
