= Vandré (footballer) =

Brazilian footballer

Personal information
- Full name: Vandré Sagrilo Monteiro
- Date of birth: 3 July 1979 (age 47)
- Place of birth: Santiago, Rio Grande do Sul, Brazil
- Height: 1.68 m (5 ft 6 in)
- Position: Attacking midfielder

Senior career*
Years	Team	Apps	(Gls)
1996–1998	Criciúma		
1999–2000	Santo Ângelo		
2000	Joaçaba EC		
2001	Santo Ângelo		
2002	São José (RS)		
2002	Brasil de Pelotas		
2003–2004	RS Futebol		
2004	Veranópolis		
2005	Glória		
2005	RS Futebol		
2006	Veranópolis		
2006	Inter de Santa Maria		
2006–2008	Happy Valley	23	(1)
2008	South China	10	(1)
2009	Inter de Santa Maria	3	(0)
- * Club domestic league appearances and goals

Vandré Sagrilo Monteiro (born 3 July 1979) is a Brazilian former footballer. He formerly played as an attacking midfielder for Hong Kong First Division League clubs Happy Valley and South China.

He is known in Brazil as Vandré but in Hong Kong as Monteiro.

== Career statistics ==
=== Club career ===
As of February 3, 2007

Club	Season	No.	League		League Cup		Senior Shield		FA Cup		AFC Cup		Total	
Club	Season	No.	Apps	Goals	Apps	Goals	Apps	Goals	Apps	Goals	Apps	Goals	Apps	Goals
Happy Valley	2006-07	12	3	0	2	0	1	0	—	—	—	—	6	0
Happy Valley	Total													
Career Total														
