= Louis Berty Ayock =

Cameroonian football midfielder

Louis Berty
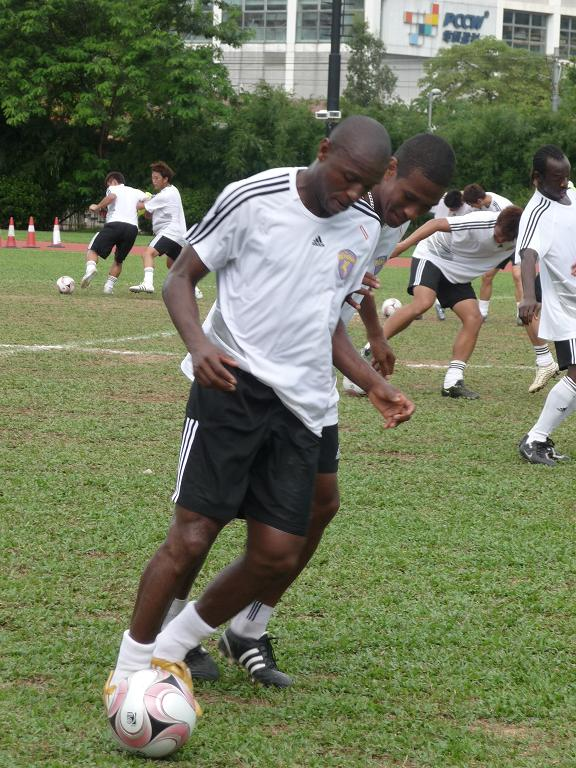

Personal information
- Full name: Louis Berty Mvoguele Ayock
- Date of birth: 21 October 1981 (age 45)
- Place of birth: Yaoundé, Cameroon
- Height: 1.78 m (5 ft 10 in)
- Position: Midfielder

Senior career*
Years	Team	Apps	(Gls)
2002–2003	Persijatim Solo	18	(8)
2003–2004	Persija Jakarta	15	(4)
2004–2005	Persijap Jepara	18	(6)
2005–2006	Persib Bandung	16	(2)
2006–2007	Hong Kong Rangers	15	(7)
2007–2008	Kitchee	14	(4)
2008–2009	Pegasus	19	(5)
- * Club domestic league appearances and goals

Ayock Louis Berty (born 21 November 1981, in Yaoundé, Cameroon) is a Cameroonian former professional footballer.

He played for Rangers in the Hong Kong First Division League in 2006–07, for Kitchee in 2007–08, and for Pegasus in 2008–09.
