= Poon Man Tik =

Hong Kong footballer

Poon Man Tik 潘文迪
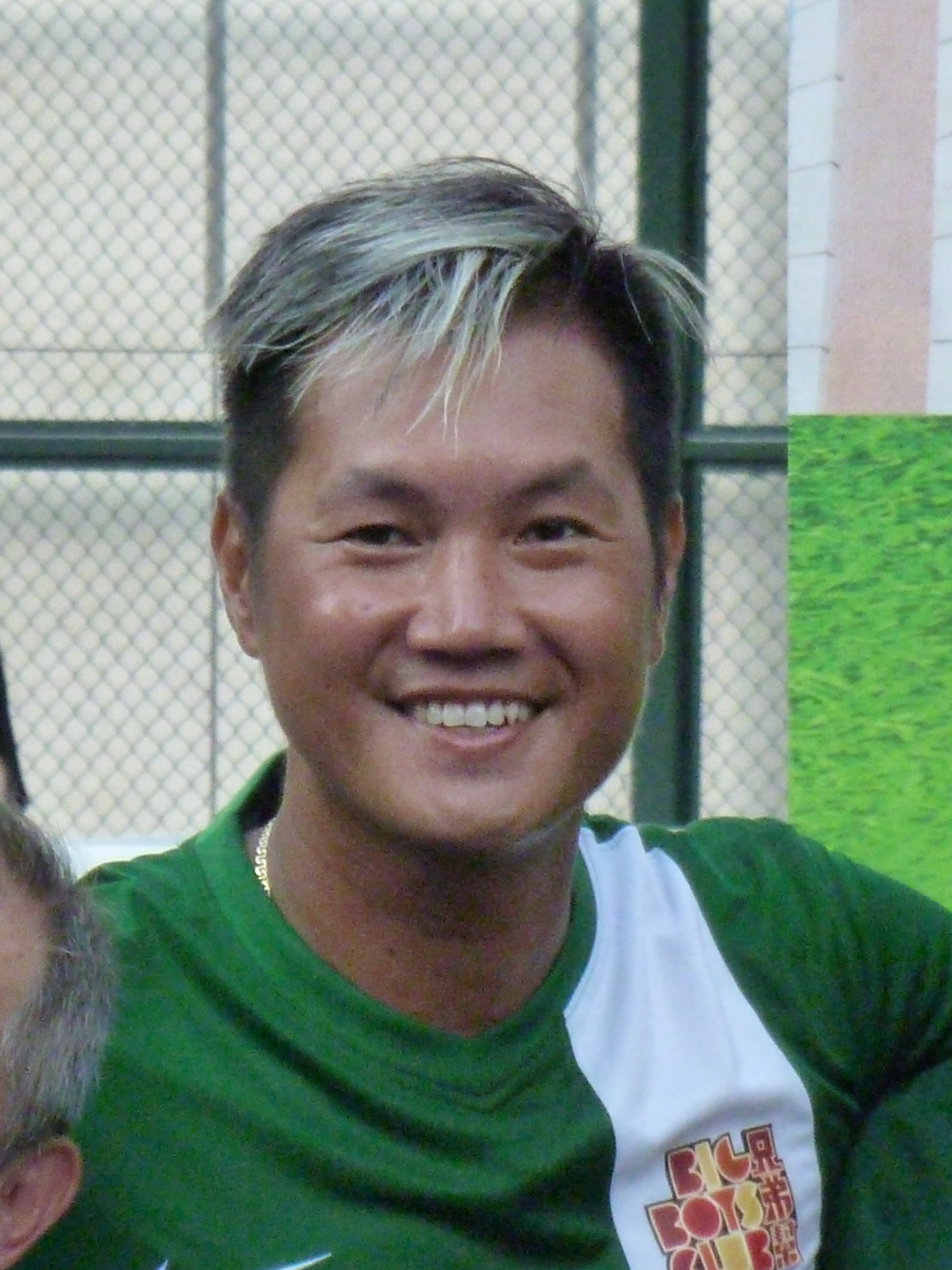
- Poon Man Tik in 2014

Personal information
- Full name: Poon Man Tik
- Date of birth: 24 February 1975 (age 51)
- Place of birth: Hong Kong
- Height: 1.83 m (6 ft 0 in)
- Position: Defensive midfielder

Senior career*
Years	Team	Apps	(Gls)
1993–1994	Voicelink		
1994–1995	Golden		
1995–1997	Eastern		
1997–2003	South China		
2003–2006	Sun Hei	19	(3)
2006–2009	Happy Valley	51	(10)
2009–2010	Tai Chung	17	(2)
2011	Hong Ngai		

International career
1998–2005	Hong Kong	15	(1)

Managerial career
- 2009–2010: Tai Chung (assistant coach)
- 2015–2016: Happy Valley
- 2018–2020: Happy Valley (director of football)
- 2020–2022: Sham Shui Po (assistant coach)
- 2022: Sham Shui Po
- 2024–2025: Rangers (HKG) (assistant coach)
- 2025–2026: Rangers (HKG)
- 2026–: Rangers (HKG) (director of football)
- * Club domestic league appearances and goals

Poon Man Tik (Chinese: 潘文迪; Jyutping: pun^{1} man^{4} dik^{6}; born 24 February 1975) is a Hong Kong former professional footballer who played as a defensive midfielder. He is currently the director of football at Hong Kong Premier League club Rangers.

== Club career ==
He has played as a defensive midfielder and right back over his career.

== Coaching career ==
On 22 August 2025, Poon was appointed as the head coach of Rangers.
