= Lin Zhong =

Lin Zhong is a Chinese American computer scientist. He is currently a professor of Computer Science with Yale University. He received his B.S and M.S. in electronic engineering from Tsinghua University and Ph.D. in electrical engineering from Princeton University. From 2005 to 2019, he was with Rice University. At Yale, he leads the Efficient Computing Lab to make computing, communication, and interfacing more efficient and effective. He and his students received the best paper awards from ACM MobileHCI, IEEE PerCom, IEEE QCE, ACM MobiSys (3), and ACM ASPLOS. He is a recipient of the NSF CAREER Award, the Duncan Award from Rice University, the RockStar Award (2014) and Test of Time Award (2022) from ACM SIGMOBILE. He is a Fellow of IEEE and ACM.

His research has provided the technical foundation to Skylark Wireless and Theseus OS.
