= Chung Kin Hei =

Hong Kong footballer

Personal information
- Full name: Chung Kin Hei Jason
- Date of birth: 20 September 1972 (age 54)
- Place of birth: Hong Kong
- Height: 1.80 m (5 ft 11 in)
- Position: Left back

Senior career*
Years	Team	Apps	(Gls)
1994–1995	Kitchee		
1995–1997	Happy Valley		
1997–1999	Yee Hope		
1999–2000	Sai Kung		
2000–2009	Sun Hei		(0)
2009–2010	Wing Yee		(0)

International career
2000	Hong Kong	2	(0)
- * Club domestic league appearances and goals

Chung Kin Hei (Chinese: 鍾健希; Cantonese Yale: Jūng Gihn Hēi; born 20 September 1972 in Hong Kong) is a former Hong Kong footballer who played as a left back.

== Honours ==
Convoy Sun Hei

- Hong Kong First Division League: 2001-02, 2003–04, 2004–05
- Hong Kong League Cup: 2002-03, 2003–04, 2004–05
- Hong Kong Senior Shield: 2004-05
- Hong Kong FA Cup: 2002-03, 2004–05, 2005–06
