= Lo Chi Kwan =

Hong Kong footballer (born 1981)

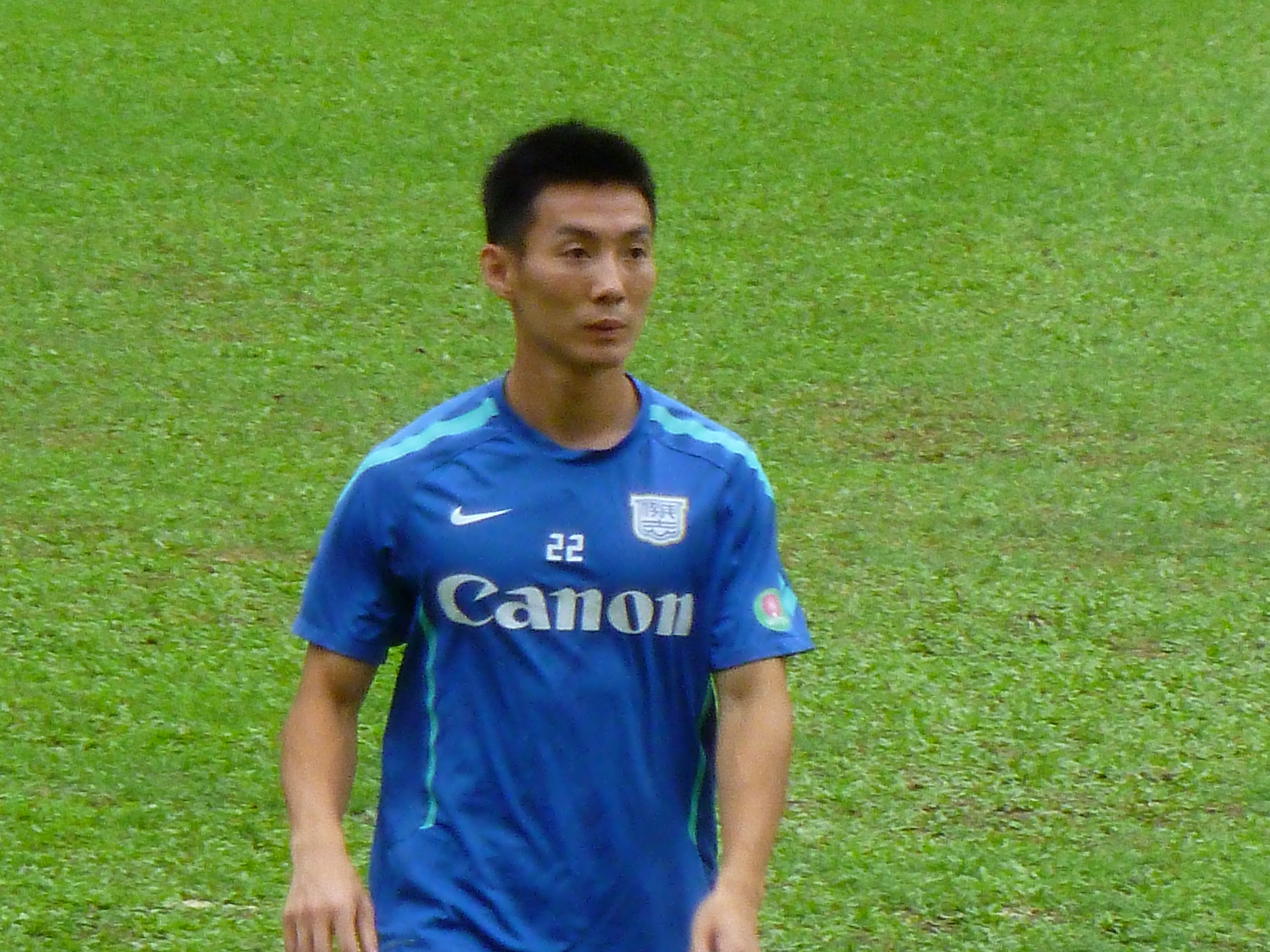

Personal information
- Full name: Lo Chi Kwan
- Date of birth: 18 March 1981 (age 45)
- Place of birth: Hong Kong
- Height: 1.70 m (5 ft 7 in)
- Position: Midfielder

Team information
- Current team: Lee Man (assistant coach)

Youth career
- Citizen

Senior career*
Years	Team	Apps	(Gls)
1997–1998	Golden		
1998–2000	Sai Kung Friends		
2000–2010	Sun Hei	107	(11)
2010–2011	Fourway Rangers	18	(1)
2011–2014	Kitchee	21	(5)
2013–2014	→ Southern (loan)	17	(1)
2014–2016	Eastern	16	(1)
2017–2020	St. Joseph's	17	(3)
2020–2021	Kui Tang		
2021–	Sai Kung	24	(7)

International career
1999–2001	Hong Kong U-23		
2003–2011	Hong Kong	25	(4)

Managerial career
- 2016–2025: Eastern (assistant coach)
- 2025–: Lee Man (assistant coach)
- * Club domestic league appearances and goals as of 17 May 2026

Lo Chi Kwan (Chinese: 羅志焜; Jyutping: lo^{4} zi^{3} gwan^{1}; born 18 March 1981) is a Hong Kong football coach and former professional footballer. He is currently the assistant coach of Hong Kong Premier League club Lee Man.

== Club career ==
=== Kitchee ===
Lo Chi Kwan scored a hat-trick in Kitchee's 6–0 win over Hong Kong Sapling on 25 September 2011.

== Career statistics ==
=== International ===
As of 9 February 2011

#	Date	Venue	Opponent	Result	Scored	Competition
1	25 March 2003	Mong Kok Stadium, Hong Kong	Laos	5–1	0	2004 AFC Asian Cup preliminary
2	30 March 2003	Mong Kok Stadium, Hong Kong	Bangladesh	2–2	0	2004 AFC Asian Cup preliminary
3	8 November 2003	Tashkent, Uzbekistan	Tajikistan	0–0	0	2004 AFC Asian Cup qualification
4	17 November 2003	Rajamangala National Stadium, Bangkok, Thailand	Thailand	0–4	0	2004 AFC Asian Cup qualification
5	21 November 2003	Rajamangala National Stadium, Bangkok, Thailand	Tajikistan	0–1	0	2004 AFC Asian Cup qualification
6	12 December 2003	International Stadium Yokohama, Yokohama, Japan	China	1–3	1	2003 EAFF Championship
7	2 December 2004	Jalan Besar Stadium, Singapore	Myanmar	2–2	1	Friendly
8	29 January 2006	Hong Kong Stadium, Hong Kong	Denmark	0–3	0	2006 Carlsberg Cup
9	1 February 2006	Hong Kong Stadium, Hong Kong	Croatia	0–4	0	2006 Carlsberg Cup
10	18 February 2006	Hong Kong Stadium, Hong Kong	India	2–2	0	Friendly
11	1 March 2006	Bangabandhu National Stadium, Dhaka, Bangladesh	Bangladesh	1–0	0	2007 AFC Asian Cup qualification
12	12 August 2006	Hong Kong Stadium, Hong Kong	Singapore	1–2	0	Friendly
13	16 August 2006	Pakhtakor Markaziy Stadium, Tashkent, Uzbekistan	Uzbekistan	2–2	0	2007 AFC Asian Cup qualification
14	6 September 2006	Hong Kong Stadium, Hong Kong	Uzbekistan	0–0	0	2007 AFC Asian Cup qualification
15	11 October 2006	Al-Gharafa Stadium, Doha, Qatar	Qatar	0–2	0	2007 AFC Asian Cup qualification
16	15 November 2006	Mong Kok Stadium, Hong Kong	Bangladesh	2–0	0	2007 AFC Asian Cup qualification
17	1 June 2007	Gelora Bung Karno Stadium, Jakarta, Indonesia	Indonesia	0–3	0	Friendly
18	10 June 2007	So Kon Po Recreation Ground, Hong Kong	Macau	2–1	0	2007 Hong Kong–Macau Interport
19	19 June 2007	Estádio Campo Desportivo, Macau	Chinese Taipei	1–1	1	2008 EAFF Championship Preliminary
20	21 June 2007	Estádio Campo Desportivo, Macau	Guam	15–1	1	2008 EAFF Championship Preliminary
21	24 June 2007	Estádio Campo Desportivo, Macau	North Korea	0–1	0	2008 EAFF Championship Preliminary
22	10 November 2007	Hong Kong Stadium, Hong Kong	Turkmenistan	0–0	0	2010 FIFA World Cup qualification
23	18 November 2007	Olympic Stadium, Ashgabat, Turkmenistan	Turkmenistan	0–3	0	2010 FIFA World Cup qualification
24	19 November 2008	Macau UST Stadium, Macau	Macau	9–1	0	Friendly
25	9 February 2011	Shah Alam Stadium, Kuala Lumpur	Malaysia	0–2	0	Friendly
