= Hong Kong 08 =

- Full name: Hong Kong 08
- Founded: 2002
- Dissolved: 2007
- League: Hong Kong First Division
- 2006–07: First Division, 10th
Home colours	Away colours

Hong Kong 08 (Chinese: 香港08) was a Hong Kong football club which competed in the Hong Kong football league system between 2002 and 2007. It was established to train young talents for the 2008 Olympics, thus was named as "Hong Kong 08".
