= Leung Chun Pong =

Hong Kong footballer (born 1986)

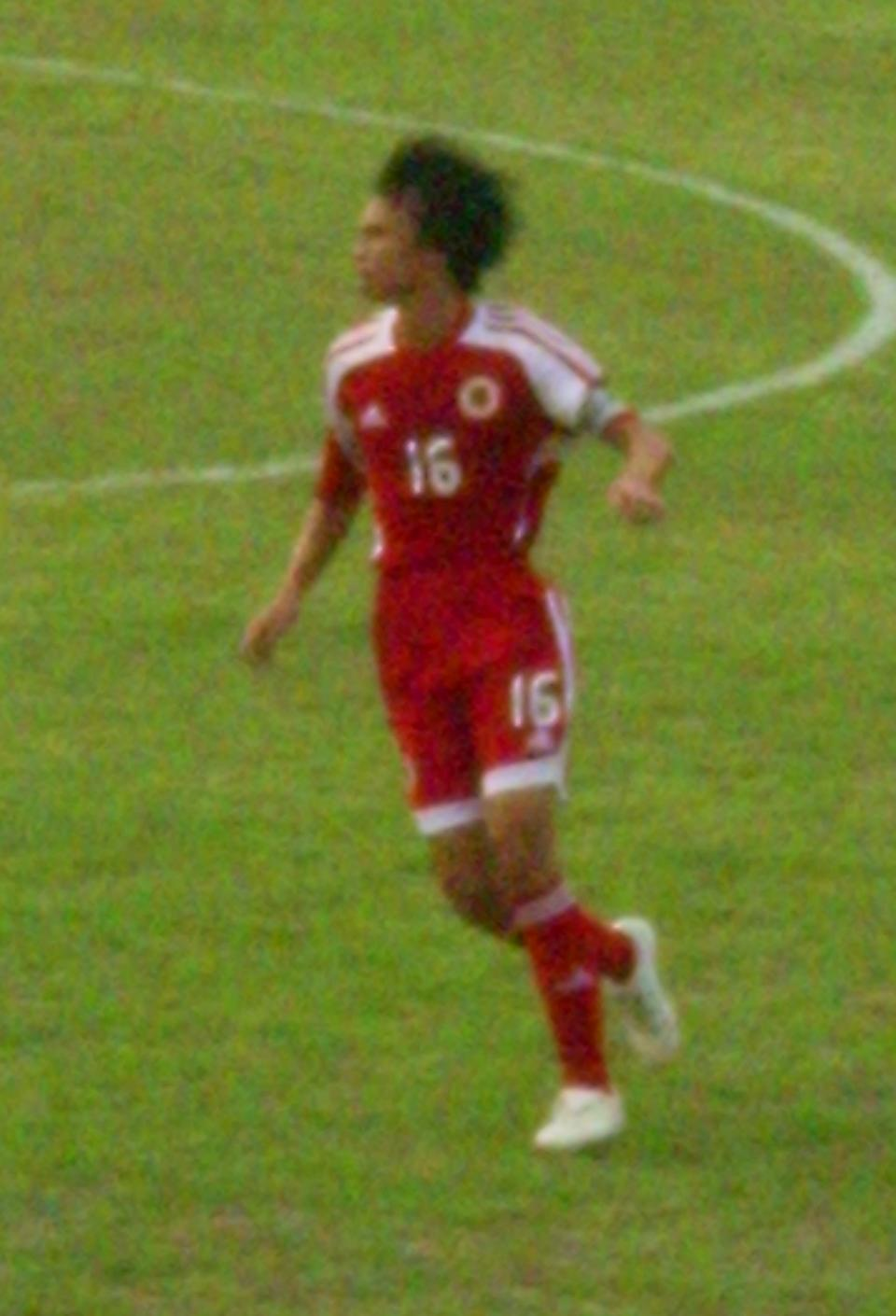

Personal information
- Full name: Leung Chun Pong
- Date of birth: 1 October 1986 (age 40)
- Place of birth: Hong Kong
- Height: 1.77 m (5 ft 10 in)
- Position: Defensive midfielder

Team information
- Current team: Eastern
- Number: 29

Youth career
- 2002–2004: Hong Kong 08

Senior career*
Years	Team	Apps	(Gls)
2004–2007	Citizen	45	(8)
2007–2009	Happy Valley	40	(4)
2009–2012	South China	38	(4)
2012–2013	Guangdong Sunray Cave	33	(5)
2014–2016	South China	34	(1)
2016–	Eastern	160	(1)

International career^{‡}
2001–2004	Hong Kong U-20		
2005–2009	Hong Kong U-23	21	(1)
2006–2018	Hong Kong	54	(1)
Medal record
Representing Hong Kong
East Asian Games
Gold medal – first place	2009 Hong Kong	Football
- * Club domestic league appearances and goals as of 22 November 2026 ‡ National team caps and goals as of 16 November 2018

Leung Chun Pong (Chinese: 梁振邦; Jyutping: loeng^{4} zan^{3} bong^{1}; born 1 October 1986) is a Hong Kong professional footballer who currently plays as a defensive midfielder for Hong Kong Premier League club Eastern.

== Club career ==
=== Early career ===
Leung graduated from CCC Hoh Fok Tong College and PLK Fong Wong Kam Cheun Primary School (A.M.) in Tuen Mun.

=== South China ===
Leung scored a goal to help South China win 3–1 at home to VB Sports Club and advance to the second round of the 2010 AFC Cup. On 30 May 2012, Leung decided to leave South China and develop his career in mainland China.

=== Guangdong Sunray Cave ===
On 12 June 2012, Leung moved to mainland China and signed a contract with China League One club Guangdong Sunray Cave. He made his debut for Guangdong Sunray Cave on 23 June 2012 in a 2–0 away win against Beijing Baxy. On 30 June 2012, he scored his first goal in China League One in the match between Guangdong Sunray Cave and Shanghai East Asia, where Guangdong Sunray Cave lost to Shanghai East Asia 1–2.

=== South China ===
In January 2014, Leung rejoined South China.

=== Eastern ===
On 8 July 2016, Leung joined Eastern.

== International career ==
On 12 August 2006, Leung made his international debut for Hong Kong in a friendly match against Singapore.

Leung's lung was infected after playing a friendly against India in October 2010 and had to be hospitalised in an isolated ward. He recovered 2 days later and was released from hospital.

On 28 July 2011, Leung was sent off in the 0–5 defeat by Saudi Arabia in the 2014 FIFA World Cup qualifiers. He was suspended for two games for this red card, and had to miss two games in the 2011 Long Teng Cup.

== Career statistics ==
=== Club ===
As of 21 May 2026

Club Performance			League		Cup						Continental		Total	
Season	Club	League	Apps	Goals	Apps	Goals	Apps	Goals	Apps	Goals	Apps	Goals	Apps	Goals
Hong Kong			League		Senior Shield		League Cup		FA Cup		Asia		Total	
2004–05	Citizen	Hong Kong First Division	14	1	2	0	1	0	2	0	—		19	1
2005–06	Citizen	Hong Kong First Division	14	3	1	0	3	1	2	1	—		20	5
2006–07	Citizen	Hong Kong First Division	17	4	1	0	4	1	1	0	—		23	5
Citizen Total			45	8	4	0	8	2	5	1	0	0	62	11
2007–08	Happy Valley	Hong Kong First Division	18	0	3	0	4	0	1	0	—		26	0
2008–09	Happy Valley	Hong Kong First Division	22	4	1	0	1	0	1	0	—		25	4
Happy Valley Total			40	4	4	0	5	0	2	0	0	0	51	4
2009–10	South China	Hong Kong First Division	11	2	2	0	—		0	0	7	1	20	3
2010–11	South China	Hong Kong First Division	13	2	0	0	3	1	2	0	6	0	24	3
2011–12	South China	Hong Kong First Division	14	0	3	0	2	0	1	0	—		20	0
South China Total			38	4	5	0	5	1	3	0	13	1	64	6
China			League						FA Cup		Asia		Total	
2012	Sunray Cave	China League One	12	3	—		—		0	0	—		12	3
2013	Sunray Cave	China League One	21	2	—		—		3	0	—		24	2
Sunray Cave Total			33	5	—	—	—	—	3	0	—	—	36	5
Hong Kong			League		Senior Shield		League Cup		FA Cup		Asia		Total	
2013–14	South China	Hong Kong First Division	8	0	0	0	0	0	1	0	7	0	16	0
2014–15	South China	Hong Kong Premier League	14	1	1	0	4	0	3	0	9	0	31	1
2015–16	South China	Hong Kong Premier League	12	0	2	1	4	0	0	0	5	0	23	1
South China Total			34	1	3	1	8	0	4	0	21	0	70	2
2016–17	Eastern	Hong Kong Premier League	15	0	1	0	—		2	1	4	0	22	1
2017–18	Eastern	Hong Kong Premier League	14	0	3	0	—		0	0	—		17	0
2018–19	Eastern	Hong Kong Premier League	18	0	2	0	—		1	0	—		21	0
2019–20	Eastern	Hong Kong Premier League	11	0	2	0	—		3	0	—		16	0
2020–21	Eastern	Hong Kong Premier League	14	0	—		—		—		2	0	16	0
2021–22	Eastern	Hong Kong Premier League	4	0	0	0	—		1	0	3	0	8	0
2022–23	Eastern	Hong Kong Premier League	17	0	3	0	—		2	0	—		22	0
2023–24	Eastern	Hong Kong Premier League	17	0	3	0	1	0	3	1	-		24	1
2024-25	Eastern	Hong Kong Premier League	21	1	3	0	1	0	3	0	5	0	34	1
2025–26	Eastern	Hong Kong Premier League	22	0	1	0			1	0	6	0	30	0
Eastern Total			143	1	18	0	3	0	16	2	20	0	210	3
Career Total			343	23	34	1	29	3	33	3	54	1	493	31

=== International ===
As of 16 November 2018

National team	Year	Apps	Goals
Hong Kong	2006	5	0
Hong Kong	2007	8	0
Hong Kong	2008	1	0
Hong Kong	2009	4	1
Hong Kong	2010	6	0
Hong Kong	2011	4	0
Hong Kong	2012	4	0
Hong Kong	2013	4	0
Hong Kong	2014	6	0
Hong Kong	2015	5	0
Hong Kong	2016	3	0
Hong Kong	2017	1	0
Hong Kong	2018	3	0
Total		54	1

==== Hong Kong U-23 ====
As of 3 January 2010

#	Date	Venue	Opponent	Result	Scored	Competition
1	29 May 2005	Mong Kok Stadium, Hong Kong	Macau	8–1	0	2005 Hong Kong–Macau Interport
2	30 October 2005	Macau UST Stadium, Macau	North Korea	0–0	0	2005 East Asian Games
3	1 November 2005	Macau UST Stadium, Macau	China	0–2	0	2005 East Asian Games
4	3 November 2005	Macau UST Stadium, Macau	Macau	7–0	0	2005 East Asian Games
5	3 June 2006	Macau UST Stadium, Macau	Macau	0–0	0	2006 Hong Kong–Macau Interport
6	29 November 2006	Al-Gharrafa Stadium, Doha, Qatar	India	1–1	0	2006 Asian Games
7	3 December 2006	Jassim Bin Hamad Stadium, Doha, Qatar	Iran	1–2	0	2006 Asian Games
8	6 December 2006	Al-Gharrafa Stadium, Doha, Qatar	Maldives	1–0	0	2006 Asian Games
9	7 February 2007	National Stadium, Dhaka, Bangladesh	Bangladesh	3–0	0	2008 Summer Olympics qualification
10	14 February 2007	Hong Kong Stadium, Hong Kong	Bangladesh	0–1	0	2008 Summer Olympics qualification
11	28 February 2007	Olympic Stadium, Tokyo, Japan	Japan	0–3	0	2008 Summer Olympics qualification
12	28 March 2007	Mong Kok Stadium, Hong Kong	Malaysia	0–1	0	2008 Summer Olympics qualification
13	18 April 2007	MPPJ Stadium, Petaling Jaya, Malaysia	Malaysia	1–0	0	2008 Summer Olympics qualification
14	16 May 2007	Hong Kong Stadium, Hong Kong	Japan	0–4	0	2008 Summer Olympics qualification
15	6 June 2007	Abbasiyyin Stadium, Damascus, Syria	Syria	1–4	0	2008 Summer Olympics qualification
16	15 June 2008	Estádio Campo Desportivo, Macau	Macau	1–0	0	2008 Hong Kong–Macau Interport
17	20 June 2009	Mong Kok Stadium, Hong Kong	Macau	5–1	1	2009 Hong Kong–Macau Interport
18	4 December 2009	Siu Sai Wan Sports Ground, Hong Kong	South Korea	4–1	0	2009 East Asian Games
19	8 December 2009	Siu Sai Wan Sports Ground, Hong Kong	China	0–1	0	2009 East Asian Games
20	10 December 2009	Hong Kong Stadium, Hong Kong	North Korea	1–1 (4–2 PSO)	0	2009 East Asian Games
21	12 December 2009	Hong Kong Stadium, Hong Kong	Japan	1–1 (4–2 PSO)	0	2009 East Asian Games

==== Hong Kong ====
As of 16 November 2018

#	Date	Venue	Opponent	Result	Scored	Competition
1	12 August 2006	Hong Kong Stadium, So Kon Po, Hong Kong	Singapore	1–2	0	Friendly
2	16 August 2006	Pakhtakor Markaziy Stadium, Tashkent, Uzbekistan	Uzbekistan	2–2	0	2007 AFC Asian Cup qualification
3	6 September 2006	Hong Kong Stadium, So Kon Po, Hong Kong	Uzbekistan	0–0	0	2007 AFC Asian Cup qualification
4	11 October 2006	Al-Gharafa Stadium, Doha, Qatar	Qatar	0–2	0	2007 AFC Asian Cup qualification
5	15 November 2006	Mong Kok Stadium, Mong Kok, Hong Kong	Bangladesh	2–0	0	2007 AFC Asian Cup qualification
6	1 June 2007	Gelora Bung Karno Stadium, Jakarta, Indonesia	Indonesia	0–3	0	Friendly
7	10 June 2007	So Kon Po Recreation Ground, So Kon Po, Hong Kong	Macau	2–1	0	2007 Hong Kong–Macau Interport
8	19 June 2007	Estádio Campo Desportivo, Macau	Chinese Taipei	1–1	0	2008 EAFF Championship Preliminary
9	21 June 2007	Estádio Campo Desportivo, Macau	Guam	15–1	0	2008 EAFF Championship Preliminary
10	24 June 2007	Estádio Campo Desportivo, Macau	North Korea	0–1	0	2008 EAFF Championship Preliminary
11	21 October 2007	Gianyar Stadium, Gianyar, Indonesia	Timor-Leste	3–2	0	2010 FIFA World Cup qualification
12	28 October 2007	Hong Kong Stadium, So Kon Po, Hong Kong	Timor-Leste	8–1	0	2010 FIFA World Cup qualification
13	10 November 2007	Hong Kong Stadium, So Kon Po, Hong Kong	Turkmenistan	0–0	0	2010 FIFA World Cup qualification
14	19 November 2008	Macau UST Stadium, Macau	Macau	9–1	0	Friendly
15	14 January 2009	Hong Kong Stadium, So Kon Po, Hong Kong	India	2–1	0	Friendly
16	23 August 2009	World Games Stadium, Kaohsiung, Taiwan	Chinese Taipei	4–0	0	2010 EAFF Championship Semi-finals
17	25 August 2009	World Games Stadium, Kaohsiung, Taiwan	North Korea	0–0	0	2010 EAFF Championship Semi-finals
18	27 August 2009	World Games Stadium, Kaohsiung, Taiwan	Guam	12–0	1	2010 EAFF Championship Semi-finals
19	7 February 2010	Olympic Stadium, Tokyo, Japan	South Korea	0–5	0	2010 East Asian Football Championship
20	11 February 2010	Olympic Stadium, Tokyo, Japan	Japan	0–3	0	2010 East Asian Football Championship
21	14 February 2010	Olympic Stadium, Tokyo, Japan	China	0–2	0	2010 East Asian Football Championship
22	3 March 2010	Hong Kong Stadium, So Kon Po, Hong Kong	Yemen	0–0	0	2011 AFC Asian Cup qualification
23	4 October 2010	Balewadi Stadium, Pune, India	India	1–0	0	Friendly
24	17 November 2010	Hong Kong Stadium, So Kon Po, Hong Kong	Paraguay	0–7	0	Friendly
25	3 June 2011	Siu Sai Wan Sports Ground, Siu Sai Wan, Hong Kong	Malaysia	1–1	0	Friendly
26	23 July 2011	Prince Mohamed bin Fahd Stadium, Dammam, Saudi Arabia	Saudi Arabia	0–3	0	2014 FIFA World Cup qualification
27	28 July 2011	Siu Sai Wan Sports Ground, Siu Sai Wan, Hong Kong	Saudi Arabia	0–5	0	2014 FIFA World Cup qualification
28	4 October 2011	Kaohsiung National Stadium, Kaohsiung, Taiwan	Chinese Taipei	6–0	0	2011 Long Teng Cup
29	29 February 2012	Mong Kok Stadium, Mong Kok, Hong Kong	Chinese Taipei	5–1	0	Friendly
30	1 June 2012	Hong Kong Stadium, So Kon Po, Hong Kong	Singapore	1–0	0	Friendly
31	10 June 2012	Mong Kok Stadium, Mong Kok, Hong Kong	Vietnam	1–2	0	Friendly
32	18 August 2012	Jurong West Stadium, Singapore	Singapore	0–2	0	Friendly
33	4 June 2013	Mong Kok Stadium, Mong Kok, Hong Kong	Philippines	0–1	0	Friendly
34	15 October 2013	Hong Kong Stadium, So Kon Po, Hong Kong	United Arab Emirates	0–4	0	2015 AFC Asian Cup qualification
35	15 November 2013	Mohammed Bin Zayed Stadium, Abu Dhabi, United Arab Emirates	United Arab Emirates	0–4	0	2015 AFC Asian Cup qualification
36	19 November 2013	Hong Kong Stadium, So Kon Po, Hong Kong	Uzbekistan	0–2	0	2015 AFC Asian Cup qualification
37	6 September 2014	Lạch Tray Stadium, Hai Phong, Vietnam	Vietnam	1–3	0	Friendly
38	9 September 2014	Hougang Stadium, Hougang, Singapore	Singapore	0–0	0	Friendly
39	10 October 2014	Mong Kok Stadium, Mong Kok, Hong Kong	Singapore	2–1	0	Friendly
40	14 October 2014	Hong Kong Stadium, So Kon Po, Hong Kong	Argentina	0–7	0	Friendly
41	13 November 2014	Taipei Municipal Stadium, Taipei, Taiwan	North Korea	1–2	0	2015 EAFF East Asian Cup preliminary round 2
42	16 November 2014	Taipei Municipal Stadium, Taipei, Taiwan	Chinese Taipei	1–0	0	2015 EAFF East Asian Cup preliminary round 2
43	6 June 2015	Shah Alam Stadium, Selangor, Malaysia	Malaysia	0–0	0	Friendly
44	3 September 2015	Bao'an Stadium, Shenzhen, China	China	0–0	0	2018 FIFA World Cup qualification – AFC second round
45	7 November 2015	Mong Kok Stadium, Mong Kok, Hong Kong	Myanmar	5–0	0	Friendly
46	12 November 2015	National Football Stadium, Malé, Maldives	Maldives	1–0	0	2018 FIFA World Cup qualification – AFC second round
47	17 November 2015	Mong Kok Stadium, Mong Kok, Hong Kong	China	0–0	0	2018 FIFA World Cup qualification – AFC second round
48	11 October 2016	Mong Kok Stadium, Mong Kok, Hong Kong	Singapore	2–0	0	Friendly
49	9 November 2016	Mong Kok Stadium, Mong Kok, Hong Kong	Chinese Taipei	4–2	0	EAFF E-1 Football Championship 2017 Round 2
50	12 November 2016	Mong Kok Stadium, Mong Kok, Hong Kong	North Korea	0–1	0	EAFF E-1 Football Championship 2017 Round 2
51	28 March 2017	Camille Chamoun Sports City Stadium, Beirut, Lebanon	Lebanon	0–2	0	2019 AFC Asian Cup qualifying round – third round
52	27 March 2018	Kim Il-sung Stadium, Pyongyang, North Korea	North Korea	0–2	0	2019 AFC Asian Cup qualifying round – third round
53	11 October 2018	Mong Kok Stadium, Mong Kok, Hong Kong	Thailand	0–1	0	Friendly
54	16 November 2018	Taipei Municipal Stadium, Taipei, Taiwan	Mongolia	5–1	0	EAFF E-1 Football Championship 2019 Round 2

== Honours ==
=== Club ===
Eastern

- Hong Kong FA Cup: 2019–20, 2023–24, 2024–25
- Hong Kong Senior Shield: 2019–20, 2024–25

=== International ===
- East Asian Games: 2009

Sporting positions
Preceded by Li Hang Wui	Hong Kong national under-23 football team captain 2008–2009	Succeeded by Au Yeung Yiu Chung

Awards
Preceded by Cheung Kin Fung; Tse Tak Him	Hong Kong First Division League Best Youth Player Award; 2006–07 with Chan Siu Ki	Succeeded by Lo Chun Kit; Kwok Kin Pong
