= So Wai Chuen =

Hong Kong footballer (born 1988)

- Traditional Chinese: 蘇偉泉
- Simplified Chinese: 苏伟泉
Transcriptions
Standard Mandarin
- Hanyu Pinyin: Sū Wěiquán
Yue: Cantonese
- Jyutping: sou^{1} wai^{5} cyun^{4}

So Wai Chuen
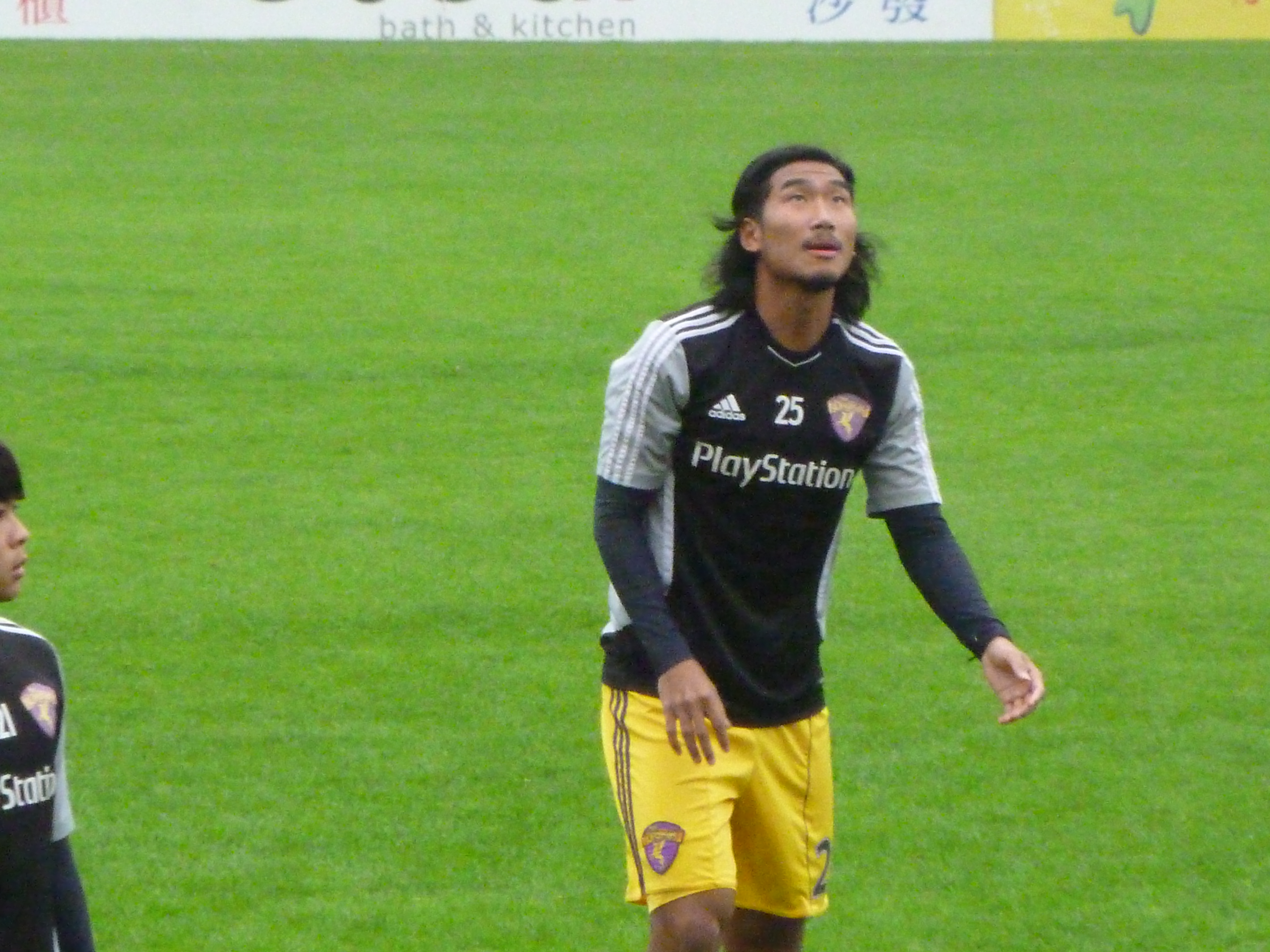

Personal information
- Full name: So Wai Chuen
- Date of birth: 26 March 1988 (age 38)
- Place of birth: Hong Kong
- Height: 1.82 m (6 ft 0 in)
- Position: Centre back

Youth career
- 2004–2005: Hong Kong 09

Senior career*
Years	Team	Apps	(Gls)
2005	→ Xiangxue Pharmaceutical (loan)	5	(0)
2005–2007	Hong Kong 08	29	(3)
2007–2008	Workable	17	(0)
2008–2009	Eastern	19	(0)
2009–2010	Sun Hei	16	(1)
2010–2015	Pegasus	32	(2)
2015–2017	Sun Hei	32	(2)
2017–2019	Double Flower	41	(4)
2019–2020	Kowloon City	10	(0)
2021–2022	Tung Sing	9	(1)
2021–2022	Citizen AA	16	(1)
2023–2025	3 Sing	32	(3)
2025–2026	Citizen AA	8	(0)
2026–	Bright Cerulean	10	(0)

International career
2007–2010	Hong Kong U-23	11	(1)
2011	Hong Kong	3	(0)
Medal record
Representing Hong Kong
East Asian Games
Gold medal – first place	2009 Hong Kong	Football
- * Club domestic league appearances and goals as of 16 May 2026

Kumer So Wai Chuen (born 26 March 1988) is a Hong Kong former professional footballer who played as a centre back.

== Career statistics ==
=== International ===
==== Hong Kong U-23 ====
As of 15 November 2010

#	Date	Venue	Opponents	Result	Goals	Competition
1	18 April 2007	Mong Kok Stadium, Hong Kong	Malaysia	0–1	0	2008 Summer Olympics qualification
2	16 May 2007	Hong Kong Stadium, Hong Kong	Japan	0–4	0	2008 Summer Olympics qualification
3	15 June 2008	Estádio Campo Desportivo, Macau	Macau	1–0	1	2008 Hong Kong–Macau Interport
4	20 June 2009	Mong Kok Stadium, Hong Kong	Macau	5–1	0	2009 Hong Kong–Macau Interport
5	4 December 2009	Siu Sai Wan Sports Ground, Hong Kong	South Korea	4–1	0	2009 East Asian Games
6	8 December 2009	Siu Sai Wan Sports Ground, Hong Kong	China	0–1	0	2009 East Asian Games
7	10 December 2009	Hong Kong Stadium, Hong Kong	North Korea	1–1 (4–2 PSO)	0	2009 East Asian Games
8	12 December 2009	Hong Kong Stadium, Hong Kong	Japan	1–1 (4–2 PSO)	0	2009 East Asian Games
9	20 June 2010	Estádio Campo Desportivo, Macau	Macau	5–1	0	2010 Hong Kong–Macau Interport
	2 November 2010	Siu Sai Wan Sports Ground, Hong Kong	South China	0–4	0	Friendly
10	9 November 2010	Huadu Stadium, Guangzhou, China	Uzbekistan	1–0	0	2010 Asian Games
11	15 November 2010	Huangpu Sports Center, Guangzhou, China	Oman	0–3	0	2010 Asian Games

==== Hong Kong ====
As of 28 July 2011

#	Date	Venue	Opponents	Result	Goals	Competition
	29 December 2009	Siu Sai Wan Sports Ground, Hong Kong	Guangdong	2–1	0	2010 Guangdong–Hong Kong Cup
	2 January 2010	Zhaoqing Sports Center, Zhaoqing, China	Guangdong	0–2	0	2010 Guangdong–Hong Kong Cup
1	3 June 2011	Siu Sai Wan Sports Ground, Hong Kong	Malaysia	1–1	0	Friendly
2	23 July 2011	Prince Mohamed bin Fahd Stadium, Dammam	Saudi Arabia	0–3	0	2014 FIFA World Cup qualification
3	28 July 2011	Siu Sai Wan Sports Ground, Hong Kong	Saudi Arabia	0–5	0	2014 FIFA World Cup qualification
