= Yuen Kin Man =

Hong Kong footballer

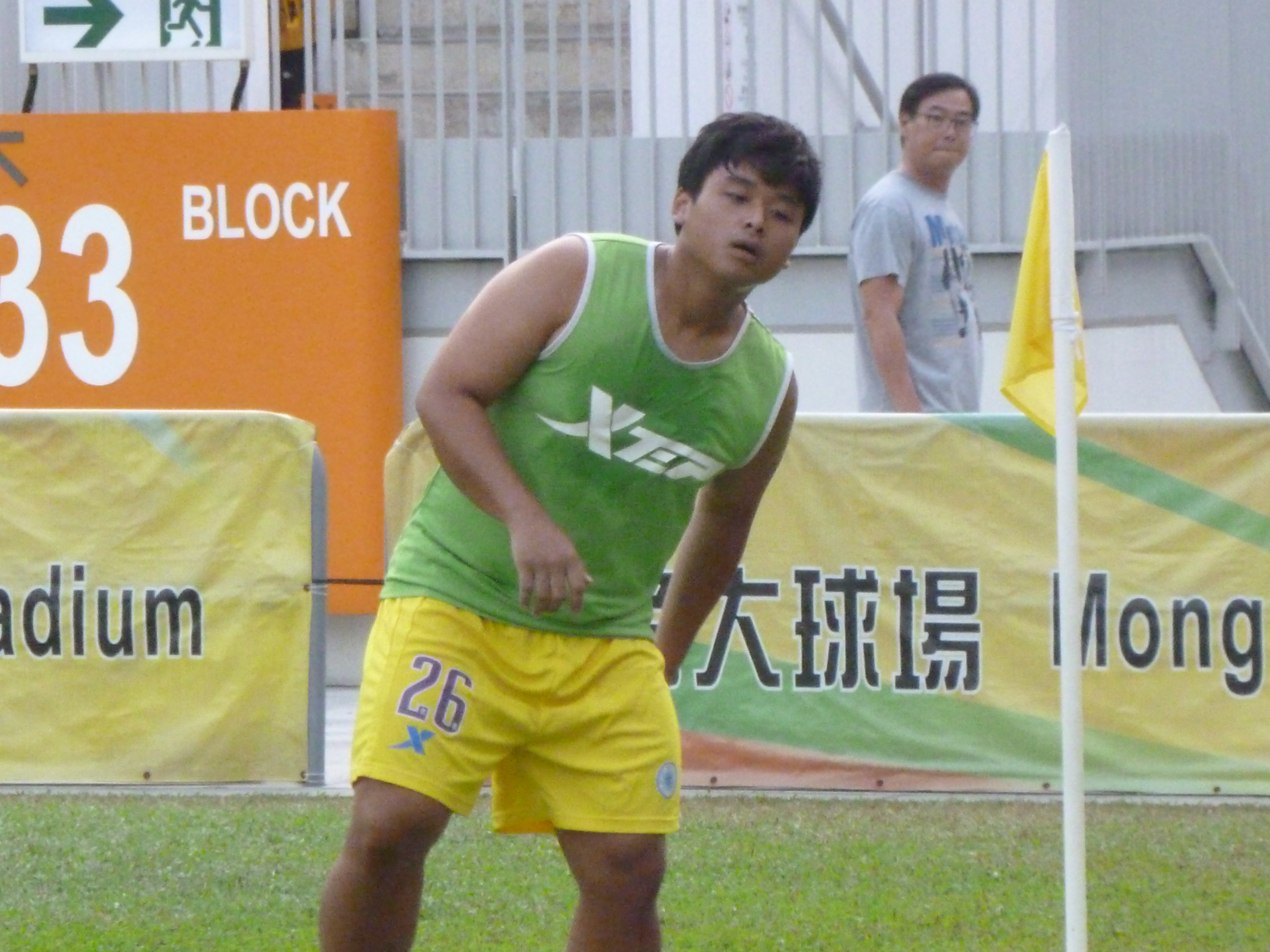

Personal information
- Full name: Yuen Kin Man
- Date of birth: 19 January 1989 (age 37)
- Place of birth: Hong Kong
- Height: 1.70 m (5 ft 7 in)
- Position: Central midfielder

Team information
- Current team: Happy Valley
- Number: 8

Senior career*
Years	Team	Apps	(Gls)
2005–2006	Hong Kong 09		
2006–2007	Hong Kong 08	14	(0)
2007–2008	Workable	13	(0)
2008–2011	Pegasus	34	(2)
2011–2012	Happy Valley	17	(1)
2012–2013	Rangers (HKG)	2	(0)
2013–2014	Kui Tan		
2018	Kwai Tsing	13	(0)
2018–2019	Tung Sing	23	(8)
2021–2023	Happy Valley	23	(0)

International career
2007–2011	Hong Kong U-23	11	(0)
2010	Hong Kong	1	(0)
Medal record
Representing Hong Kong
East Asian Games
Gold medal – first place	2009 Hong Kong	Football
- * Club domestic league appearances and goals

Yuen Kin Man (Chinese: 阮健文; Jyutping: jyun^{5} gin^{6} man^{4}; born 19 January 1989) is a former Hong Kong professional footballer. He played as a central midfielder.

== Honours ==
Pegasus

- Hong Kong Senior Shield: 2008–09

== Career statistics ==
=== Club ===
As of 11 September 2009

Club	Season	League		Senior Shield		League Cup		FA Cup		AFC Cup		Total	
Club	Season	Apps	Goals	Apps	Goals	Apps	Goals	Apps	Goals	Apps	Goals	Apps	Goals
TSW Pegasus	2008–09	7 (5)	1	3 (1)	0	2 (1)	0	1 (1)	0	N/A	N/A	13 (8)	1
TSW Pegasus	2009–10	4 (0)	0	0 (0)	0	0 (0)	0	0 (0)	0	N/A	N/A	4 (0)	0
TSW Pegasus	All	11 (5)	1	3 (1)	0	2 (1)	0	1 (1)	0	N/A	N/A	17 (8)	1

=== International ===
==== Hong Kong ====
#	Date	Venue	Opponent	Result	Scored	Competition
1	10 October 2010	Kaohsiung National Stadium, Kaohsiung	Macau	4–0	0	2010 Long Teng Cup

==== Hong Kong U-23 ====
As of 23 February 2011

#	Date	Venue	Opponent	Result	Scored	Competition
1	14 March 2007	Hong Kong Stadium, Hong Kong	Syria	0–2	0	2008 Summer Olympics qualification
2	28 March 2007	Mong Kok Stadium, Hong Kong	Malaysia	0–1	0	2008 Summer Olympics qualification
3	16 May 2007	Hong Kong Stadium, Hong Kong	Japan	0–4	0	2008 Summer Olympics qualification
4	15 June 2008	Estádio Campo Desportivo, Macau	Macau	1–0	0	2008 Hong Kong–Macau Interport
5	4 December 2009	Siu Sai Wan Sports Ground, Hong Kong	South Korea	4–1	0	2009 East Asian Games
6	8 December 2009	Siu Sai Wan Sports Ground, Hong Kong	China	0–1	0	2009 East Asian Games
7	10 December 2009	Hong Kong Stadium, Hong Kong	North Korea	1–1 (4–2 PSO)	0	2009 East Asian Games
8	12 December 2009	Hong Kong Stadium, Hong Kong	Japan	1–1 (4–2 PSO)	0	2009 East Asian Games
9	20 June 2010	Estádio Campo Desportivo, Macau	Macau	5–1	0	2010 Hong Kong–Macau Interport
10	26 January 2010	Sai Tso Wan Recreation Ground, Hong Kong	Chinese Taipei	1–0	0	Friendly
	28 September 2010	Sai Tso Wan Recreation Ground, Hong Kong	Australia	2–2	0	Friendly
	2 November 2010	Siu Sai Wan Sports Ground, Hong Kong	(Hong Kong) South China	0–4	0	Friendly
11	9 March 2011	Rasmee Dhandu Stadium, Malé, Maldives	Maldives	3–0	0	2012 AFC Men's Pre-Olympic Tournament
