= Kazuya Yamamura =

Japanese football player (born 1989)

Kazuya Yamamura 山村 和也
Personal information
- Full name: Kazuya Yamamura
- Date of birth: 2 December 1989 (age 36)
- Place of birth: Nagasaki, Nagasaki, Japan
- Height: 1.86 m (6 ft 1 in)
- Position: Centre back

Team information
- Current team: Wollongong Wolves
- Number: 18

Youth career
- 2002–2004: Kunimi Junior High School
- 2005–2007: Kunimi High School

College career
Years	Team	Apps	(Gls)
2008–2011	Ryutsu Keizai University		

Senior career*
Years	Team	Apps	(Gls)
2012–2015	Kashima Antlers	63	(4)
2016–2018	Cerezo Osaka	85	(16)
2019–2023	Kawasaki Frontale	85	(7)
2024–2025	Yokohama F. Marinos	12	(0)
2025–	Wollongong Wolves	30	(5)

International career^{‡}
2009	Japan U20	9	(2)
2010–2012	Japan U23	26	(1)
2010	Japan	1	(0)
Medal record
Kashima Antlers
Winner	J.League Cup	2012
Winner	J.League Cup	2015
Cerezo Osaka
Winner	J.League Cup	2017
Winner	Emperor's Cup	2017
Representing Japan
Asian Games
Gold medal – first place	2010 Guangzhou	Team
- * Club domestic league appearances and goals as of 26 August 2026 ‡ National team caps and goals as of 10 August 2012

Kazuya Yamamura (山村 和也, Yamamura Kazuya; born 2 December 1989) is a Japanese footballer who currently plays for National Premier Leagues NSW club Wollongong Wolves.

== International career ==
On 23 December 2009 he was named in the squad for Japan's 2011 AFC Asian Cup qualification against Yemen, and made his full international debut for the team in the fixture on 6 January 2010. He was part of the Japan's team at the 2012 Olympics.

== Career statistics ==
As of 1 March 2015

=== Club ===
Updated to 5 November 2022.

Club	Season	League			Cup^{1}		League Cup^{2}		Asia		Other^{3}		Total	
Club	Season	Division	Apps	Goals	Apps	Goals	Apps	Goals	Apps	Goals	Apps	Goals	Apps	Goals
Ryutsu Keizai University FC	2008	JFL	14	1	2	0	-		-		-		16	1
Ryutsu Keizai University FC	2009	JFL	4	0	2	0	-		-		-		6	0
Ryutsu Keizai University FC	Total		18	1	4	0	0	0	0	0	0	0	22	1
Kashima Antlers	2012	J1 League	18	1	0	0	5	0	-		-		23	1
Kashima Antlers	2013	J1 League	24	3	2	1	3	0	-		1	0	30	4
Kashima Antlers	2014	J1 League	8	0	1	0	1	0	-		-		10	0
Kashima Antlers	2015	J1 League	13	0	2	0	5	1	0	0	-		20	1
Kashima Antlers	Total		63	4	5	1	14	1	0	0	1	0	83	6
Cerezo Osaka	2016	J2 League	34	6	3	0	-		-		2	0	39	6
Cerezo Osaka	2017	J1 League	27	8	5	1	3	0	-		0	0	37	9
Cerezo Osaka	2018	J1 League	24	2	2	0	2	0	6	0	1	0	35	2
Cerezo Osaka	Total		85	16	10	1	5	0	6	0	3	0	111	17
Kawasaki Frontale	2019	J1 League	18	2	3	0	5	0	2	0	0	0	28	2
Kawasaki Frontale	2020	J1 League	13	1	0	0	1	0	-		-		14	1
Kawasaki Frontale	2021	J1 League	17	1	5	0	2	1	7	1	0	0	31	3
Kawasaki Frontale	2022	J1 League	23	1	2	0	2	0	5	0	0	0	32	1
Kawasaki Frontale	2023	J1 League	0	0	0	0	0	0	0	0	-		32	1
Kawasaki Frontale	Total		71	5	10	0	10	1	14	1	0	0	115	7
Career total			237	26	29	2	29	2	20	1	4	0	321	31

^{1}Includes Emperor's Cup.

^{2}Includes J. League Cup.

^{3}Includes Suruga Bank Championship.

=== International ===
National team	Year	Apps	Goals
Japan U20
Japan U20	2009	9	2
Japan U20	Total	9	2
Japan U23
Japan U23	2010	7	1
Japan U23	2011	7	0
Japan U23	Total	14	1
Japan
Japan	2010	1	0
Japan	Total	1	0

International appearances and goals
#	Date	Venue	Opponent	Result	Goal	Competition
2009
	11 January	Qatar SC Stadium, Doha	Syria U20	0–1	0	2009 Qatar International Friendship Tournament / Japan U20
	13 January	Qatar SC Stadium, Doha	United Arab Emirates U20	1–1	0	2009 Qatar International Friendship Tournament / Japan U20
	15 January	Qatar SC Stadium, Doha	Serbia U20	3–2	2	2009 Qatar International Friendship Tournament / Japan U20
	2 August	Suwon World Cup Stadium, Suwon	Egypt U20	0–1	0	2009 Suwon International Youth Football Tournament / Japan U20
	4 August	Suwon World Cup Stadium, Suwon	South Africa U20	6–2	0	2009 Suwon International Youth Football Tournament / Japan U20
	2 December	Siu Sai Wan Sports Ground, Hong Kong	North Korea U23	2–1	0	2009 East Asian Games / Japan U20
	7 December	Siu Sai Wan Sports Ground, Hong Kong	Macau U23	5–0	0	2009 East Asian Games / Japan U20
	10 December	Hong Kong Stadium, Hong Kong	South Korea U20	2–1	0	2009 East Asian Games / Japan U20
	12 December	Hong Kong Stadium, Hong Kong	Hong Kong U23	1–1	0	2009 East Asian Games / Japan U20
2010
1.	6 January	Ali Muhesen Stadium, Sana'a	Yemen	3–2	0	2011 AFC Asian Cup qualification
	8 November	Tianhe Stadium, Guangzhou	China U21	3–0	0	2010 Asian Games / Japan U21
	10 November	Huadu Stadium, Guangzhou	Malaysia U23	2–0	0	2010 Asian Games / Japan U21
	13 November	Huadu Stadium, Guangzhou	Kyrgyzstan U23	3–0	0	2010 Asian Games / Japan U21
	16 November	Huangpu Sports Center, Guangzhou	India U21	5–0	1	2010 Asian Games / Japan U21
	19 November	Huangpu Sports Center, Guangzhou	Thailand U23	1–0	0	2010 Asian Games / Japan U21
	23 November	Yuexiushan Stadium, Guangzhou	Iran U23	2–1	0	2010 Asian Games / Japan U21
	25 November	Tianhe Stadium, Guangzhou	United Arab Emirates U23	1–0	0	2010 Asian Games / Japan U21
2011
	9 February	Mohammed Al-Hamad Stadium, Hawalli	Kuwait	0–3	0	Friendly / Japan U22
	12 February	Bahrain National Stadium, Manama	Bahrain U22	2–0	0	Friendly / Japan U22
	26 March	Pakhtakor Markaziy Stadium, Tashkent	Uzbekistan U22	0–1	0	Friendly / Japan U22
	29 March	JAR Stadium, Tashkent	Uzbekistan U22	2–1	0	Friendly / Japan U22
	1 June	Niigata Stadium, Niigata	Australia U22	3–1	0	Friendly / Japan U22
	19 June	Toyota Stadium, Toyota	Kuwait U22	3–1	0	2012 Summer Olympics qualification / Japan U22
	23 June	Mohammed Al-Hamad Stadium, Hawalli	Kuwait U22	1–2	0	2012 Summer Olympics qualification / Japan U22

== Honours ==
=== Club ===
Kashima Antlers

- J.League Cup: 2012, 2013, 2015
- Suruga Bank Championship: 2013

Cerezo Osaka

- J.League Cup: 2017
- Emperor's Cup: 2017

Kawasaki Frontale

- J1 League: 2020, 2021
- Emperor's Cup: 2020, 2023
- J.League Cup: 2019

=== Japan ===
Japan U-23

- Asian Games : 2010
