= Li Hang Wui =

Hong Kong footballer (born 1985)

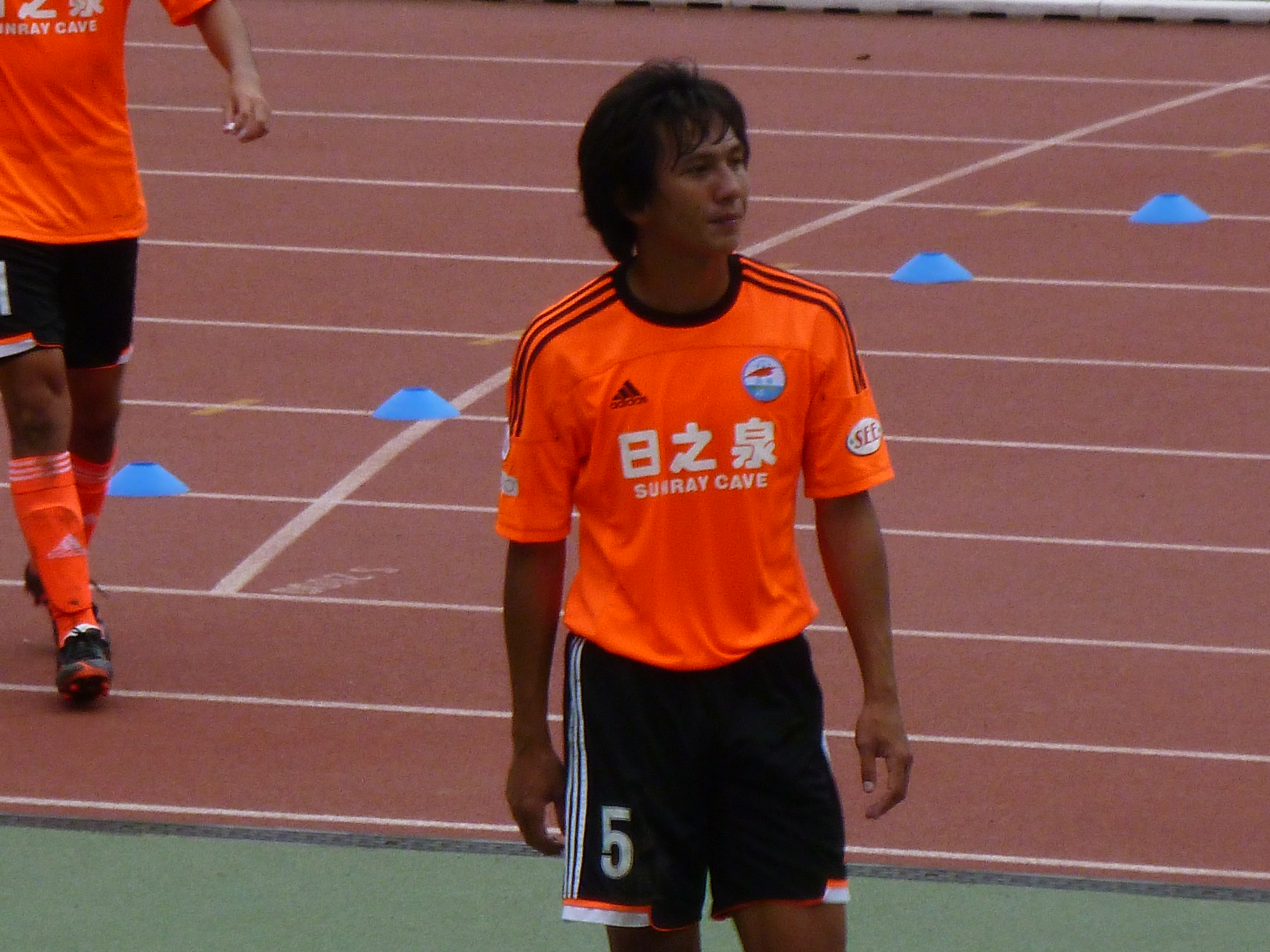

Personal information
- Full name: Li Hang Wui
- Date of birth: 15 February 1985 (age 41)
- Place of birth: Hong Kong
- Height: 1.78 m (5 ft 10 in)
- Position: Defender

Youth career
- –2000: Orient & Yee Hope Union
- 2000–2002: Rangers

Senior career*
Years	Team	Apps	(Gls)
2002–2004	Hong Kong 08		
2004–2005	Xiangxue Pharmaceutical	6	(0)
2005–2006	Citizen	11	(0)
2006–2011	Kitchee	45	(0)
2006–2007	→ HKFC (loan)	9	(0)
2010–2011	→ Tai Chung (loan)	16	(1)
2011–2013	Sun Hei	28	(0)
2013–2015	Yokohama FC Hong Kong	2	(0)
2021–2022	Tsuen Wan		

International career^{‡}
2006–2007	Hong Kong U-23	10	(0)
2010–2011	Hong Kong	5	(0)

Managerial career
- 2015–2016: Pegasus (assistant coach)
- 2016–2019: Tai Po (assistant coach)
- 2019–2021: Eastern (assistant coach)
- 2021–2022: Lee Man (assistant coach)
- 2022–2023: Tai Po
- * Club domestic league appearances and goals as of 7 June 2013 ‡ National team caps and goals as of 4 October 2011

Li Hang Wui
- Chinese: 李恆滙
Transcriptions
Standard Mandarin
- Hanyu Pinyin: Li Henghui
Yue: Cantonese
- Jyutping: lei^{5} hang^{4} wui^{6}

Li Hang Wui (Chinese: 李恆滙; born 15 February 1985) is a Hong Kong football coach and a former professional footballer.

He was the captain of Hong Kong Olympic football team in 2007.

== Career statistics ==
=== International ===
==== Hong Kong U-23 ====
As of 21 November 2009

#	Date	Venue	Opponents	Result	Goals	Captain	Competition
1	29 November 2006	Al-Gharrafa Stadium, Doha, Qatar	India	1–1	0		2006 Asian Games
2	3 December 2006	Jassim Bin Hamad Stadium, Doha, Qatar	Iran	1–2	0		2006 Asian Games
3	6 December 2006	Al-Gharrafa Stadium, Doha, Qatar	Maldives	1–0	0		2006 Asian Games
4	7 February 2007	National Stadium, Dhaka, Bangladesh	Bangladesh	3–0	0	(c)	2008 Summer Olympics qualification
5	14 February 2007	Hong Kong Stadium, Hong Kong	Bangladesh	0–1	0	(c)	2008 Summer Olympics qualification
6	28 February 2007	Olympic Stadium, Tokyo, Japan	Japan	0–3	0	(c)	2008 Summer Olympics qualification
7	28 March 2007	Mong Kok Stadium, Hong Kong	Malaysia	0–1	0	(c)	2008 Summer Olympics qualification
8	18 April 2007	MPPJ Stadium, Petaling Jaya, Malaysia	Malaysia	1–0	0	(c)	2008 Summer Olympics qualification
9	16 May 2007	Hong Kong Stadium, Hong Kong	Japan	0–4	0	(c)	2008 Summer Olympics qualification
10	6 June 2007	Abbasiyyin Stadium, Damascus, Syria	Syria	1–4	0	(c)	2008 Summer Olympics qualification

==== Hong Kong ====
As of 4 October 2011

#	Date	Venue	Opponent	Result	Goals	Competition
1	4 October 2010	Balewadi Stadium, Pune, India	India	1–0	0	Friendly
2	9 February 2011	Shah Alam Stadium, Kuala Lumpur	Malaysia	0–2	0	Friendly
3	30 September 2011	Kaohsiung National Stadium, Kaohsiung, Taiwan	Philippines	3–3	0	2011 Long Teng Cup
4	2 October 2011	Kaohsiung National Stadium, Kaohsiung, Taiwan	Macau	5–1	0	2011 Long Teng Cup
5	4 October 2011	Kaohsiung National Stadium, Kaohsiung, Taiwan	Chinese Taipei	6–0	0	2011 Long Teng Cup

Sporting positions
Preceded by Fan Chun Yip	Hong Kong national under-23 football team captain 2007	Succeeded by Leung Chun Pong
