= Au Yeung Yiu Chung =

Hong Kong footballer (born 1989)

Au Yeung Yiu Chung 歐陽耀冲
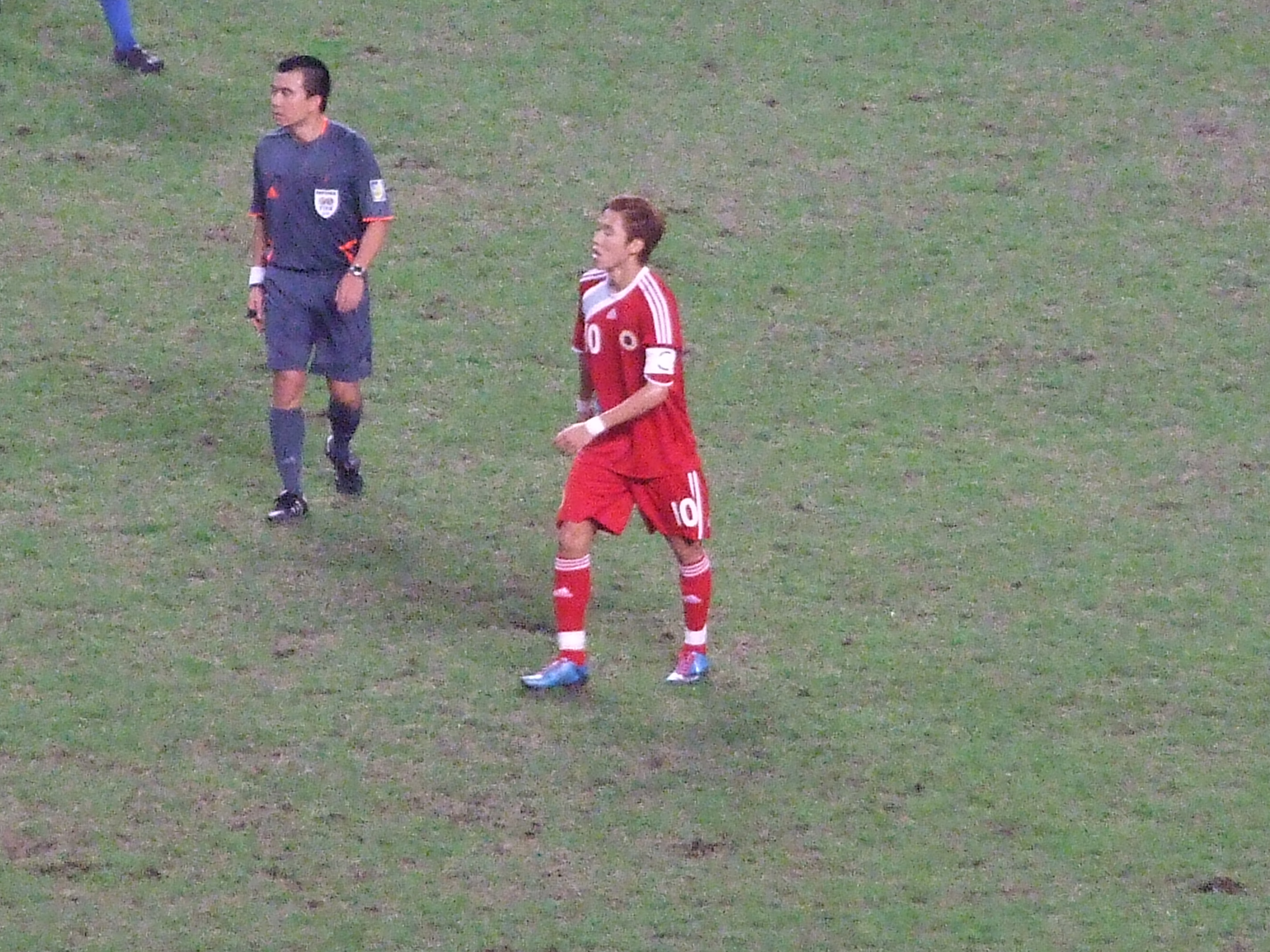
- Au Yeung in 2009

Personal information
- Date of birth: 11 July 1989 (age 37)
- Place of birth: Hong Kong
- Height: 1.75 m (5 ft 9 in)
- Position: Attacking midfielder

Team information
- Current team: Gorilla of the Universe

Youth career
- 2005–2006: Hong Kong 09

Senior career*
Years	Team	Apps	(Gls)
2005–2006	Hong Kong 09	14	(3)
2006–2007	Hong Kong 08	22	(4)
2007–2008	Workable	23	(4)
2008–2013	South China	99	(28)
2013–2014	Yokohama FC Hong Kong	15	(1)
2014–2015	Atlético CP	2	(0)
2015–2016	Loures	4	(0)
2016–2018	Guizhou Zhicheng	3	(0)
2018	Dreams FC	4	(0)
2018–2019	Tai Po	4	(1)
2019–2020	Rangers (HKG)	12	(2)
2021–2022	YSCC Yokohama	0	(0)
2023	Iwate Grulla Morioka	0	(0)
2024	Rangers (HKG)	8	(1)
2024	Kamatamare Sanuki	1	(0)
2025	Kowloon City	1	(0)

International career
2007–2011	Hong Kong U-23	18	(0)
2008–2012	Hong Kong	17	(4)
Medal record
Representing Hong Kong
East Asian Games
Gold medal – first place	2009 Hong Kong	Football
- * Club domestic league appearances and goals

Au Yeung Yiu Chung

Chinese name
- Traditional Chinese: 歐陽耀冲
Transcriptions
Yue: Cantonese
- Yale Romanization: Āuyèuhng Yiuhchūng (Note: 歐 could be Ngāu and using numbers in place of tone marks is valid as Au^{1}jeung^{4} Yiu^{6}chung^{1} or Ngau^{1}jeung^{4} Yiu^{6}chung^{1})
- Jyutping: Au1joeng4 Jiu6cung1 (Note: 歐 could be Ngau1.)
- Hong Kong Romanisation: Au Yeung Yiu Chung (Note: 歐 and 冲 could be Ngau and Tsung respectively.)
- IPA: [(ŋ)ɐ́u jœ̏ːŋ.jìːu tsʰóŋ]

Vietnamese name
- Vietnamese: Âu Dương Diệu Xung

Au Yeung Yiu Chung (Chinese: 歐陽耀冲; born 11 July 1989), commonly known as Au Chung, is a former Hong Kong professional footballer who played as a midfielder.

== Club career ==
Au Yeung studied at Yan Chai Hospital Tung Chi Ying Memorial Secondary School in Shatin and played for the school's football team in inter-school tournaments.

=== Early career ===
Au Yeung made his debut in the Hong Kong First Division League for Hong Kong 08. After the team was disbanded at the end of the season, he turned down an offer from South China to join Workable for the 2007–08 season.

After one season with Workable, which saw the team relegated for 2008–09 season, Au Yeung finally joins South China and takes over the vacant no. 10 shirt. He was only 18 when he signed for South China.

=== South China ===
In South China, his playing opportunities are less regular, as he plays in a similar position as team captain Li Haiqiang.

In 2010, Au spent a week with Tottenham Hotspur, the club partner of South China AA, and trained with the first team and received personal training from the Hotspurs.

In October 2011, Au Yeung and teammate Kwok Kin Pong were sent to Tottenham Hotspur for training with Spurs' first team as part of the duo's development.

In the 2011 AFC Cup, Au Yeung was sent on as a substitute against East Bengal. He played on the right wing and delivered a perfect cross for Mateja Kežman to head home and scored the winning goal for South China.

=== Yokohama FC Hong Kong ===
On 10 June 2013, Yokohama FC Hong Kong announced that they have recruited Au Yeung and will send him, alongside Wong Wai, Leung Kwun Chung and Lee Kar Yiu to Yokohama FC on 16 June for a month's training. Au Yeung said he joined Yokohama FC Hong Kong because he wanted more playing opportunities. He will wear number 19 for his new club.

Au Yeung scored his only goal in the season against Sunray Cave JC Sun Hei on 30 March 2014.

=== Atlético CP ===
On 22 August 2014, Atlético CP announced through their official website that they have completed the transfer of Au Yeung. He made his debut against S.C. Olhanense on 24 May 2015.

=== GS Loures ===
Au Yeung was unable to establish a place in Atlético CP. He transferred to G.S. Loures on 1 November 2015. Also, he has played 90 minutes for the first match.

=== Guizhou Zhicheng ===
On 26 December 2015, Au Yeung had signed by China League One club Guizhou Zhicheng with a 3 years contract.

=== Dreams FC ===
On 2 March 2018, Hong Kong Premier League club Dreams announced that they had signed Au Yeung. On 3 July 2018, the club announced that Au Yeung's services would not be retained.

=== Tai Po ===
After an injury-shorted half season, Au Yeung left Dreams. He signed a one-year contract with Tai Po on 31 July 2018 in order to work with head coach Lee Chi Kin.

Even though he had experience in Chinese Super League and Chinese League One in the previous year, Au Yeung was unable to break into the first team, and his chances were limited in the reserve team. He was played 4 times in the entire season, including 2 league matches, 1 cup match and 1 AFC match.

On 19 June 2019, Au Yeung announced that his contract with Tai Po had ended and would search for a new club abroad.

=== Rangers ===
On 31 July 2019, Au Yeung signed a one-year contract with Rangers. He became a regular player in the first two league matches but failed to lead the team to victory. And he went on playing for the club in the first half of the 2019–20 season while a regular starting XI place was not guaranteed due to the arrival of several attacking players. He was released by the club after the club announced that they would withdraw from the remainder of the season.

=== YSCC Yokohama ===
On 13 April 2021, J3 League club YSCC Yokohama announced that they have signed a contract with Au Yeung. He became the first Hong Kong player to play for a J.League club.

On 7 January 2023, Au Yeung confirmed that he has already left the club.

=== Iwate Grulla Morioka ===
On 21 January 2023, J3 League club Iwate Grulla Morioka announced that they had signed a contract with Au Yeung.

=== Rangers ===
On 1 January 2024, Au Yeung played a trial match for Rangers in the HKPLC Cup. He scored a Penalty in a 3–0 win over Eastern. Then on 8 January 2024, he rejoined Rangers after 4 years. He played a total of 8 official matches in the 2023–24 season for Rangers with one goal.

=== Kamatamare Sanuki ===
On 2 August 2024, Au Yeung joined J3 League club Kamatamare Sanuki.

On 14 September 2024, Au Yeung made his J3 League debut for the club in the match against Zweigen Kanazawa. He is the first-ever Hong Kong player to appear in the J.League.

=== Kowloon City ===
On 27 January 2025, Au Yeung returned to Hong Kong and joined Kowloon City.

== International career ==
Au Yeung was selected for the Hong Kong team in 2008 and made his international debut in the 9–1 thrashing of Macau in November of the same year, scoring one goal.

On 14 January 2009, Au Yeung scored his second goal for Hong Kong with a free kick against India. On 30 September 2011, Au Yeung scored the equalising goal in the 3:3 draw with the Philippines in the 2011 Long Teng Cup.

=== 2009 East Asian Games ===
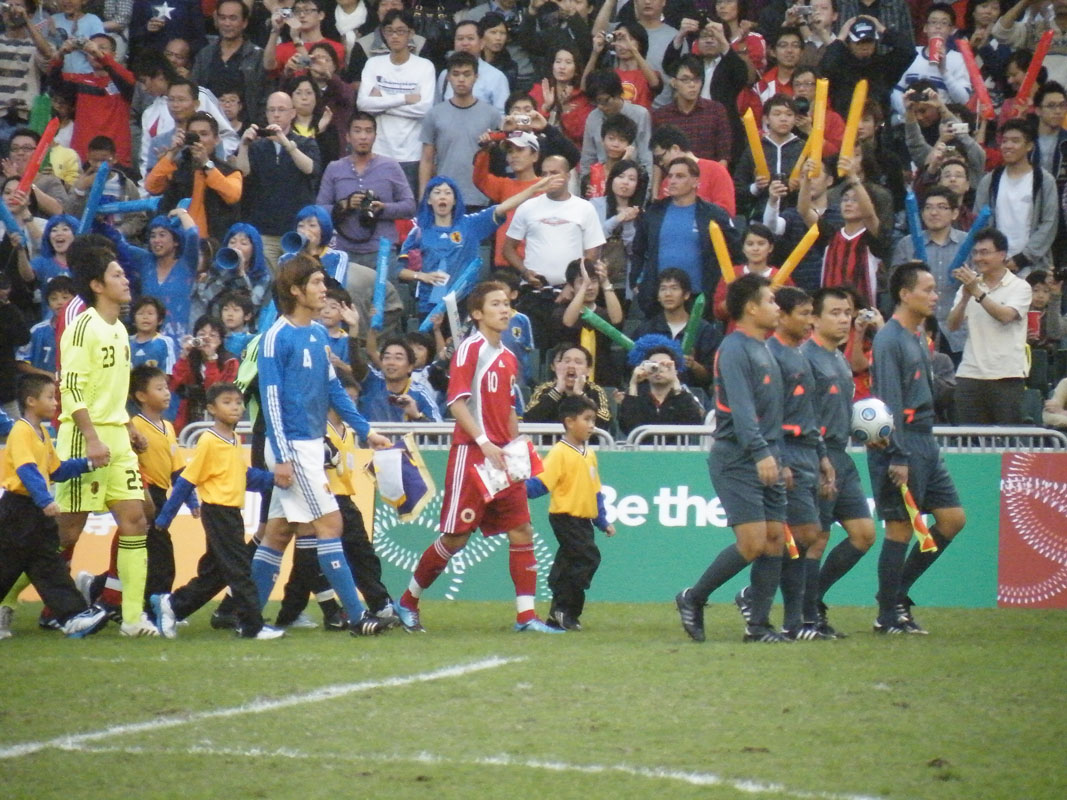
Au Yeung captaining Hong Kong in the gold medal match of the 2009 East Asian Games

Au Yeung was appointed as captain by coach Kim Pan-gon for the 2009 East Asian Games. He led the side to the final against Japan, which ended 1–1 after extra time. Despite Au Yeung missing the first kick, Hong Kong scored the following four while Japan missed two, winning the gold medal.

=== 2010 Asian Games ===
Au Yeung was a member of the Hong Kong national under-23 football team again for the 2010 Asian Games. In the final group game, Au Yeung scored two goals against Bangladesh and helped Hong Kong win 4:1 and advance to the knock-out stage for the first time in 52 years. But Hong Kong was then eliminated by 0:3 by Oman.

=== 2012 Olympic Games ===
Au Yeung was a member of the Hong Kong national under-23 football team again for the 2012 London Olympics. The team won its first round tie against Maldives by 7–0 aggregate score but lost 0:3 on aggregate to Uzbekistan in the second round.

He has been omitted from the national squad ever since due to his lack of form.

== Career statistics ==
=== Club ===
As of 7 October 2015

Club	Season	League		Junior Shield		League Cup		FA Cup		AFC Cup		Total	
Club	Season	Apps	Goals	Apps	Goals	Apps	Goals	Apps	Goals	Apps	Goals	Apps	Goals
Hong Kong 09	2005–06	13	3	1	0	N/A	N/A	N/A	N/A	N/A	N/A	14	3
Hong Kong 09	All	13	3	1	0	0	0	0	0	0	0	14	3
Club	Season	League		Senior Shield		League Cup		FA Cup		AFC Cup		Total	
Club	Season	Apps	Goals	Apps	Goals	Apps	Goals	Apps	Goals	Apps	Goals	Apps	Goals
Hong Kong 08	2006–07	16	3	1	0	4	1	1	0	N/A	N/A	22	4
Hong Kong 08	All	16	3	1	0	4	1	1	0	0	0	22	4
Workable	2007–08	17	4	1	0	4	0	1	0	N/A	N/A	23	4
Workable	All	17	4	1	0	4	0	1	0	0	0	23	4
South China	2008–09	21	7	2	0	1	1	3	1	7	0	34	9
South China	2009–10	12	3	2	0	-	-	0	0	7	0	21	3
South China	2010–11	12	2	1	1	2	0	2	0	4	0	21	3
South China	2011–12	8	2	3	1	0	0	0	0	N/A	N/A	11	3
South China	2012–13	12	5	2	0	0	0	5	4	N/A	N/A	19	9
South China	All	65	19	10	2	3	1	10	5	18	0	106	27
Yokohama FC Hong Kong	2013–14	14	1	0	0	0	0	1	0	N/A	N/A	15	1
Yokohama FC Hong Kong	All	14	1	0	0	0	0	1	0	0	0	15	1
Club	Season	League		Taça de Portugal		Taça da Liga		Total					
Club	Season	Apps	Goals	Apps	Goals	Apps	Goals	Apps	Goals				
Atlético CP	2014–15	1	0	0	0	0	0	1	0				
Atlético CP	2015–16	0	0	0	0	1	0	1	0				
Atlético CP	All	1	0	0	0	1	0	2	0				
Club	Season	League		Taça de Portugal		Taça da Liga		Total					
Club	Season	Apps	Goals	Apps	Goals	Apps	Goals	Apps	Goals				
G.S. Loures	2015–16	5	0	0	0	N/A	N/A	5	0				
G.S. Loures	All	5	0	0	0	0	0	5	0				

=== International ===
As of 16 October 2012

National team	Year	Apps	Goals
Hong Kong	2008	1	1
Hong Kong	2009	4	1
Hong Kong	2010	4	0
Hong Kong	2011	3	1
Hong Kong	2012	5	1
Total		17	4

== Honours ==
South China

- Hong Kong First Division: 2008–09, 2009–10
- Hong Kong Senior Shield: 2009–10
- Hong Kong FA Cup: 2010–11
- Hong Kong League Cup: 2010–11

Tai Po

- Hong Kong Premier League: 2018–19

Rangers

- Hong Kong Sapling Cup: 2023–24

Hong Kong

- East Asian Games: 2009

Sporting positions
Preceded by Leung Chun Pong	Hong Kong national under-23 football team captain 2009	Succeeded by Chan Wai Ho
Awards
Preceded by Lo Chun Kit; Kwok Kin Pong	Hong Kong First Division League Best Youth Player Award; 2008–09 with Li Hon Ho	Succeeded by Yapp Hung Fai; Kwok Kin Pong
