= Gorilla of the Universe FC =

- Short name: G.Universe
- Founded: 2015; 11 years ago
- Ground: Lin Fong Sports Centre
- Capacity: 2,200
- Manager: (Macau) Cai Wenfan
- League: Liga de Elite
- 2025: 1st, 2ª Divisão (Promoted)
- Website: Website

Gorilla of the Universe FC (Chinese: 新科宇宙之猩, sometimes translated as Cosmic Gorilla) is an association football club based Macau currently competing in the Liga de Elite.

== History ==
Gorilla of the Universe FC finished the 2025 season as champion of the 2ª Divisão. With the championship, the club earned promotion to the Liga de Elite for the first time ahead of the 2026 season. Ahead of its maiden top-flight season, the team rebuilt two-thirds of its roster to prepare for the increase in competition, despite limited financial resources. It also brought in Cai Wenfan as head coach because of his experience coaching first division clubs. The final squad featured mostly locals players supplemented with foreign talent, notably two strikers. The club won its first-ever match in the league on the opening matchday with a victory over Benfica de Macau.

== Domestic history ==
Key

Champion Runners-up 3rd place

Season	League							Notes
Season	Div.	Pos.	Pl.	W	D	L	P	Notes
2019	4ª Divisão	1st (Group F)	4	4	0	0	12	Eliminated in Final 16 round of playoffs
2020	Not held because of COVID-19 pandemic							
2021	4ª Divisão	1st	9	9	0	0	27	Promoted to 3ª Divisão
2022	3ª Divisão	3rd	10	5	2	3	17	Promoted to 2ª Divisão
2023	2ª Divisão	10th	13	2	0	11	6	Relegated to 3ª Divisão
2024	3ª Divisão	2nd	11	7	2	2	23	Promoted to 2ª Divisão
2025	2ª Divisão	1st	13	9	2	2	29	Promoted to Liga de Elite
2026	Liga de Elite	6th	18	7	2	9	23	

== Current squad ==
Squad for the 2026 Liga de Elite

Note: Flags indicate national team as defined under FIFA eligibility rules; some limited exceptions apply. Players may hold more than one non-FIFA nationality.

No.	Pos.	Nation	Player
1	GK	MAC	Chak-Fong Lam
9	DF	MAC	Man-Hei Chan (captain)
9	MF	CIV	Eden Nrick
10	MF	MAC	Pak-San Kou
17	MF	MAC	Ion-Tou Li
18	DF	MAC	Kai-Wang Chu

No.	Pos.	Nation	Player
20	DF	MAC	Tak-Ian Un
22	MF	HKG	Au Chung
22	DF	MAC	Lok-In Tai
24	FW	MAC	Chak-Man Vong
66	MF	MAC	Tin-Iao Wan
96	DF	MAC	Sio-Meng Leong
