= Football at the East Asian Games =

Association football tournaments were held at the East Asian Games from its first edition in 1999 until the last Games in 2013. Participating players had to be under 23 years of age. Men's football was featured at every event while women's football was included only in 2013.

== Medal table ==
Rank	Nation	Gold	Silver	Bronze	Total
1	South Korea	2	2	1	5
2	North Korea	2	2	0	4
3	Japan	1	2	3	6
4	China	1	1	2	4
5	Hong Kong	1	0	0	1
6	Kazakhstan	0	0	1	1
Totals (6 entries)		7	7	7	21

== Events ==
Event	93	97	01	05	09	13	Years
Men's event	X	X	X	X	X	X	6
Women's event	O	O	O	O	O	X	1

== Men's event ==
=== Participating nations ===
Nation	93	97	01	05	09	13	Years
Australia^{1}	-	-	Y	-	-	-	1
China	3	3	-	1	Y	Y	5
Chinese Taipei	-	-	-	Y	-	-	1
Guam	-	Y	Y	-	-	-	2
Hong Kong	-	-	-	Y	1	4	3
Japan	4	2	1	3	2	3	6
Kazakhstan^{2}	-	4	3	-	-	-	2
North Korea	2	-	-	2	4	1	4
South Korea	1	1	2	4	3	2	6
Macau	Y	-	Y	Y	Y	-	4
Mongolia	Y	Y	Y	-	-	-	3
Total nations	6	6	7	7	6	5	

- 1: Guest Member
- 2: Former member

=== Results ===
Year	Host	Final			Third Place Match		
Year	Host	Winner	Score	Runner-up	3rd Place	Score	4th Place
1993; Details	(China) Shanghai	South Korea		North Korea	China		Japan
1997; Details	(South Korea) Busan	South Korea		Japan	China		Kazakhstan
2001; Details	(Japan) Osaka	Japan	2–1	Australia	South Korea	4–1	Kazakhstan
2005; Details	Macau	China	1–0	North Korea	Japan	4–1	South Korea
2009; Details	Hong Kong	Hong Kong	1–1 aet (4–2) pen	Japan	South Korea	1–1 aet (4–2) pen	North Korea
2013; Details	(China) Tianjin	North Korea		South Korea	Japan		Hong Kong

== Women's event ==
=== Participating nations ===
Nation	2013	Years
China	2	1
Chinese Taipei	4	1
Japan	3	1
North Korea	1	1
Total nations	4	

=== Results ===
Year	Host	Round robin					
Year	Host	Winner	Score	Runner-up	3rd Place	Score	4th Place
2013; Details	(China) Tianjin	North Korea		China	Japan		Chinese Taipei
