= Macau national under-23 football team =

National association football team

Macau U-23
- Association: Associação de Futebol de Macau-China
- Confederation: AFC (Asia)
- Sub-confederation: EAFF (East Asia)
- Head coach: Emmanuel Noruega (caretaker)
- Home stadium: Estádio Campo Desportivo
- FIFA code: MAC
| First colours | Second colours |

First international
- South Korea B 12–0 Macau (Shanghai, China; 10 May 1993)

Biggest win
- Macau 4–0 Mongolia (Osaka, Japan; 23 May 2001)

Biggest defeat
- Japan B 19–0 Macau (Shanghai, China; 14 May 1993)

The Macau national under-23 football team represents Macau in international football competitions in the Asian Games, the East Asian Games, as well as any other under-23 international football tournaments. It is controlled by the Football Association of Macau, China.

== Competitive record ==
=== AFC U-23 Championship Record ===
| AFC U-23 Championship | | | | | | | | | Qualification record | | | | | |
| Year | Result | Position | Pld | W | D | L | GF | GA | Pld | W | D | L | GF | GA |
|---|---|---|---|---|---|---|---|---|---|---|---|---|---|---|
| (Oman) 2013 | Did not qualify | | | | | | | | 5 | 0 | 0 | 5 | 4 | 18 |
| (Qatar) 2016 | Did not qualify | | | | | | | | 3 | 0 | 0 | 3 | 0 | 16 |
| (China) 2018 | Did not qualify | | | | | | | | 3 | 0 | 0 | 3 | 2 | 25 |
| (Thailand) 2020 | Did not qualify | | | | | | | | 3 | 0 | 0 | 3 | 3 | 17 |
| (Uzbekistan) 2022 | Did not enter | | | | | | | | Did not enter | | | | | |
| (Qatar) 2024 | Did not qualify | | | | | | | | 3 | 0 | 0 | 3 | 0 | 21 |
| (Saudi Arabia) 2026 | Did not qualify | | | | | | | | 3 | 0 | 0 | 3 | 1 | 13 |
| (Japan) 2028 | To be determined | | | | | | | | To be determined | | | | | |
| Total | – | 0/5 | 0 | 0 | 0 | 0 | 0 | 0 | 20 | 0 | 0 | 20 | 10 | 110 |

=== East Asian Games ===
East Asian Games
| Year | Result | Position | Pld | W | D | L | GF | GA |
|---|---|---|---|---|---|---|---|---|
| (China) 1993 | Group stage | 6th | 5 | 0 | 0 | 5 | 3 | 52 |
| (South Korea) 1997 | Did not enter | | | | | | | |
| (Japan) 2001 | Group stage | 5th | 3 | 1 | 1 | 1 | 4 | 5 |
| (Macau) 2005 | Group stage | 7th | 3 | 0 | 0 | 3 | 0 | 30 |
| (Hong Kong) 2009 | Group stage | 6th | 2 | 0 | 0 | 2 | 0 | 13 |
| (China) 2013 | Did not enter | | | | | | | |
| Total | Group stage | 4/6 | 13 | 1 | 1 | 11 | 7 | 100 |
