= Tsang Yi Hang =

Hong Kong footballer

Personal information
- Full name: Ellison Tsang Yi Hang
- Date of birth: 27 October 2003 (age 23)
- Place of birth: Hong Kong
- Height: 1.83 m (6 ft 0 in)
- Positions: Centre back; defensive midfielder

Team information
- Current team: Lee Man
- Number: 22

Youth career
- –2021: Kitchee

Senior career*
| Years | Team | Apps | (Gls) |
| 2021–2023 | Kitchee | 1 | (0) |
| 2023 | HK U23 | 3 | (0) |
| 2025– | Lee Man | 7 | (0) |

International career^{‡}
| 2022 | Hong Kong U-20 | 4 | (1) |
| 2025 | Hong Kong U-22 | 2 | (0) |
| 2023– | Hong Kong U-23 | 17 | (0) |
- * Club domestic league appearances and goals as of 7 November 2026 ‡ National team caps and goals as of 23 September 2026

Ellison Tsang Yi Hang (Chinese: 曾以行; born 27 October 2003) is a Hong Kong professional footballer who currently plays as a centre back or a defensive midfielder for Hong Kong Premier League club Lee Man.

== Club career ==
On 23 September 2021, Tsang was promoted to the first team of Kitchee.

On 16 August 2023, Tsang joined HK U23.

In January 2024, it was reported that Tsang joined Northern Premier League Premier Division club F.C. United of Manchester. However, due to his student visa restrictions, he was unable to register for any football clubs in England and could only play for the University of Salford, where he was studying.

On 9 July 2025, Tsang joined Lee Man.

== International career ==
At the age of 18, Tsang was called up to the Hong Kong national team. He was named in the squad against Japan, South Korea and China in the 2022 EAFF E-1 Football Championship.

Tsang was part of the Hong Kong U-23 side at the 2022 Asian Games, which advanced to the semi-finals. Hong Kong had beat Iran 1–0 in the quarter-finals.

== Career statistics ==
=== Club ===
As of 2 January 2021

| Club | Season | League | | | National Cup | | League Cup | | Other | | Total | |
| Club | Season | Division | Apps | Goals | Apps | Goals | Apps | Goals | Apps | Goals | Apps | Goals |
|---|---|---|---|---|---|---|---|---|---|---|---|---|
| Kitchee | 2021–22 | Hong Kong Premier League | 0 | 0 | 0 | 0 | 4 (Note: Appearances in the Sapling Cup) | 0 | 0 | 0 | 4 | 0 |
| Career total | | | 0 | 0 | 0 | 0 | 4 | 0 | 0 | 0 | 4 | 0 |
