= Football at the 2009 East Asian Games =

2009 East Asian Games

Tournament details
- Host country: Hong Kong
- Dates: 2 December – 12 December
- Teams: 6 (from 1 confederation)
- Venues: 2 (in 1 host city)

Final positions
- Champions: Hong Kong (1st title)
- Runners-up: Japan
- Third place: South Korea
- Fourth place: North Korea

Tournament statistics
- Matches played: 10
- Goals scored: 34 (3.4 per match)
- Attendance: 97,816 (9,782 per match)
- Top scorer: Nine players (2 goals each)

The football tournament at the 2009 East Asian Games was held from 2 December 2009 to 13 December 2009. Host Hong Kong defeated Japan 4–2 in a penalty shoot-out in the final after a 1–1 draw to win their first-ever international title, while South Korea beat North Korea with the same score to finish third.

== Venues ==
All group stage matches were held at Siu Sai Wan Sports Ground. The semi-finals, third place play-off and final were held at Hong Kong Stadium.

Hong Kong
So Kon Po	Siu Sai Wan
Hong Kong Stadium	Siu Sai Wan Sports Ground
Capacity: 40,000	Capacity: 12,000

== Calendar ==
A total of 6 teams took part in the tournament. Group stage matches commenced on 2 December 2009, three days before the opening ceremony. The teams were divided into two groups each consisting of three teams for a round-robin group stage. The top two teams in each pool would advance to a four-team single-elimination bracket.

Group stage	Semi-final	Medal matches

December	2	3	4	5	6	7	8	9	10	11	12	13	Matches
Football	1	1	1		1	1	1		2		2		10
Total	1	1	1	0	1	1	1	0	2	0	2	0	10

== Squads ==
Each team submitted a squad of 23 players, including three goalkeepers. At previous tournaments, the age limit was set at 23 with three overage players allowed. However, restrictions were lifted in 2009.

The South Korean team was selected from the semi-professional Korea National League, while China PR and Japan sent U-20 teams. Hong Kong sent their U-23 team, with the exception of four players who were above 23.

== Group stage ==
=== Group A ===
Team	Pld	W	D	L	GF	GA	GD	Pts
Japan	2	2	0	0	7	1	+6	6
North Korea	2	1	0	1	9	2	+7	3
Macau	2	0	0	2	0	13	-13	0

2 December 2009
UTC+8 18:00

Japan	2 – 1	North Korea
Otsuka 30'; Suzuki 59'	Report by EAG; Report by HKFA	Choe Chol-man 52'

Siu Sai Wan Sports Ground, Hong Kong
Attendance: 4,100
Referee: Sukhbir Singh (Singapore)

4 December 2009
UTC+8 18:00

North Korea	8 – 0	Macau
Choe Chol-man 6'; Kim Kuk-jin 21'; Ri Kwang-hyok 45'; Choe Myong-ho 58', 90+1'; Pak Nam-chol 63'; Pak Song-chol 71'; Pak Kwang-ryong 90+2'	Report by EAG; Report by HKFA

Siu Sai Wan Sports Ground, Hong Kong
Attendance: 1,360
Referee: Ramachandran Krishnan (Malaysia)

7 December 2009
UTC+8 18:00

Macau	0 – 5	Japan
	Report by EAG; Report by HKFA	Oshitani 39'; Aoki 45+2'; Osako 53'; Kakitani 60'; Kawai 63'

Siu Sai Wan Sports Ground, Hong Kong
Attendance: 1,050
Referee: Sukhbir Singh (Singapore)

=== Group B ===
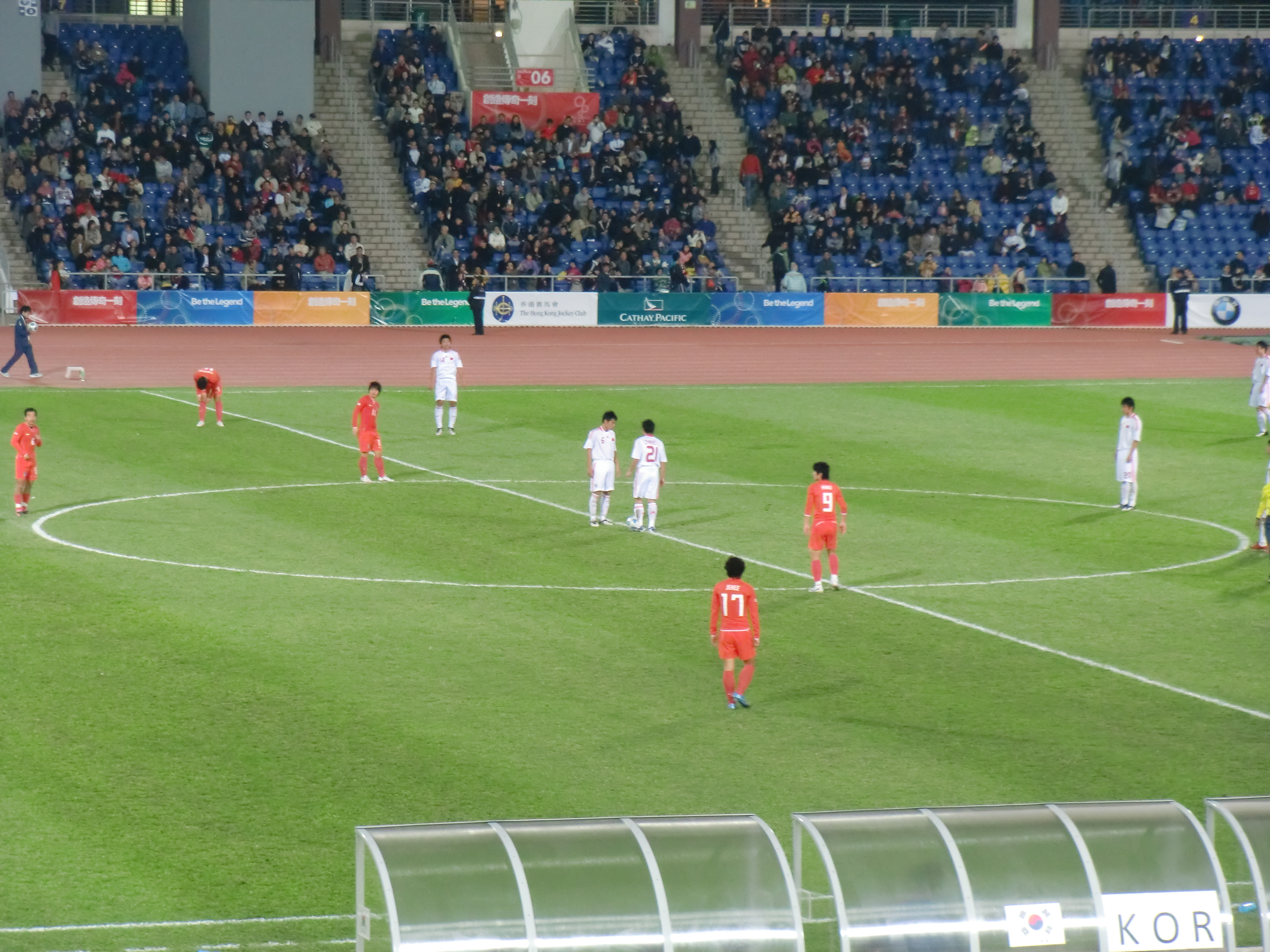
South Korea playing against China PR at Siu Sai Wan Sports Ground.

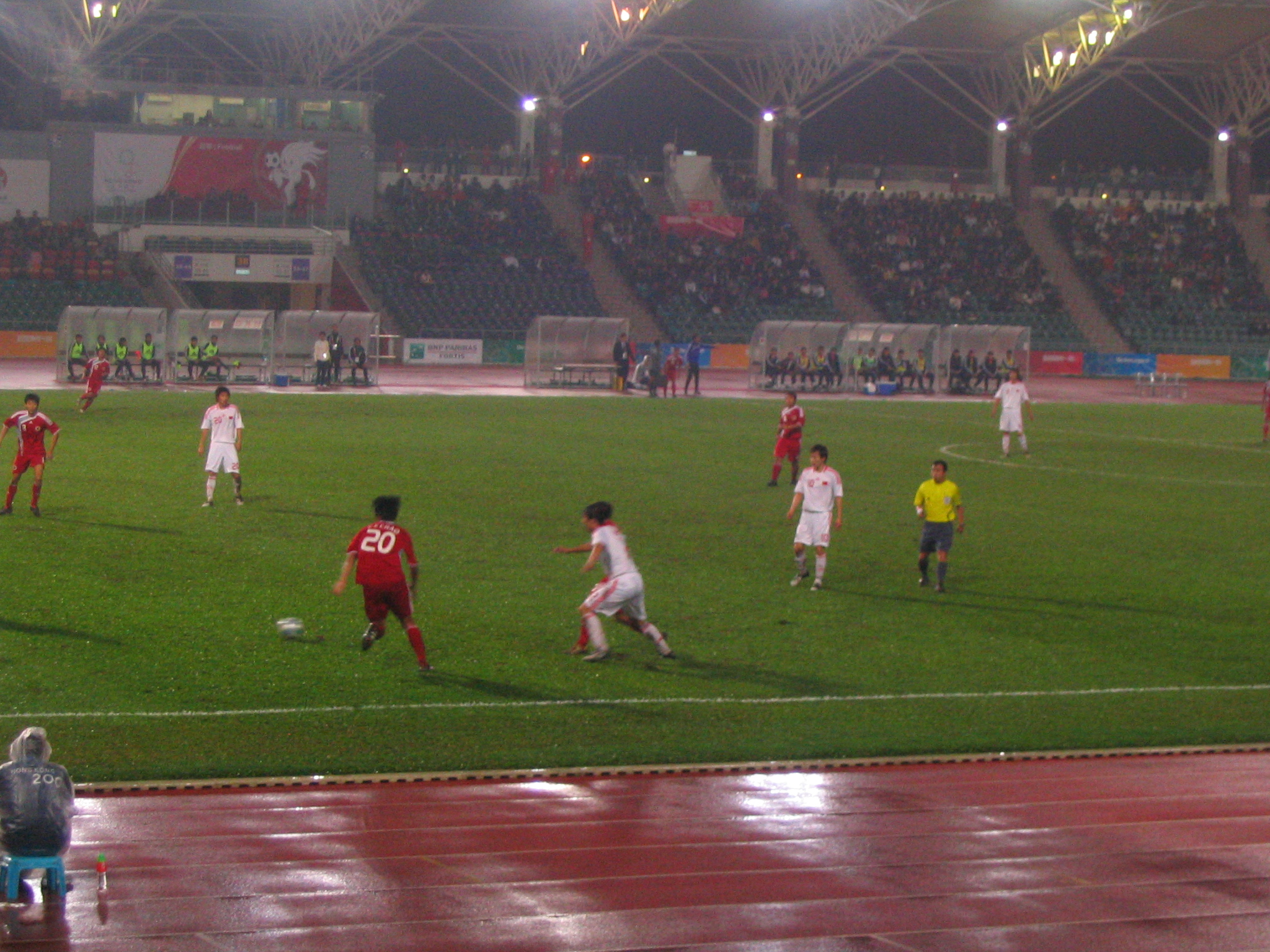
Hong Kong playing against China PR at Siu Sai Wan Sports Ground.

Team	Pld	W	D	L	GF	GA	GD	Pts
Hong Kong (H)	2	1	0	1	4	2	+2	3
South Korea	2	1	0	1	4	4	0	3
China	2	1	0	1	1	3	-2	3

3 December 2009
UTC+8 18:00

Hong Kong	4 – 1	South Korea
Chan Wai Ho 21'; Wong Chin Hung 30'; Xu Deshuai 65'; Chan Siu Ki 81'	Report by EAG; Report by HKFA	Go Min-gi 45'

Siu Sai Wan Sports Ground, Hong Kong
Attendance: 5,000
Referee: Phùng Đình Dũng (Vietnam)

6 December 2009
UTC+8 18:00

South Korea	3 – 0	China
Park Jong-chan 49', 65'; Kim Ho-you 79' (pen.)	Report by EAG; Report by HKFA

Siu Sai Wan Sports Ground, Hong Kong
Attendance: 3,160
Referee: Win Cho (Myanmar)

8 December 2009
UTC+8 18:00

China	1 – 0	Hong Kong
Gao Di 24'	Report by EAG; Report by HKFA

Siu Sai Wan Sports Ground, Hong Kong
Attendance: 6,000
Referee: Phùng Đình Dũng (Vietnam)

== Knockout stage ==
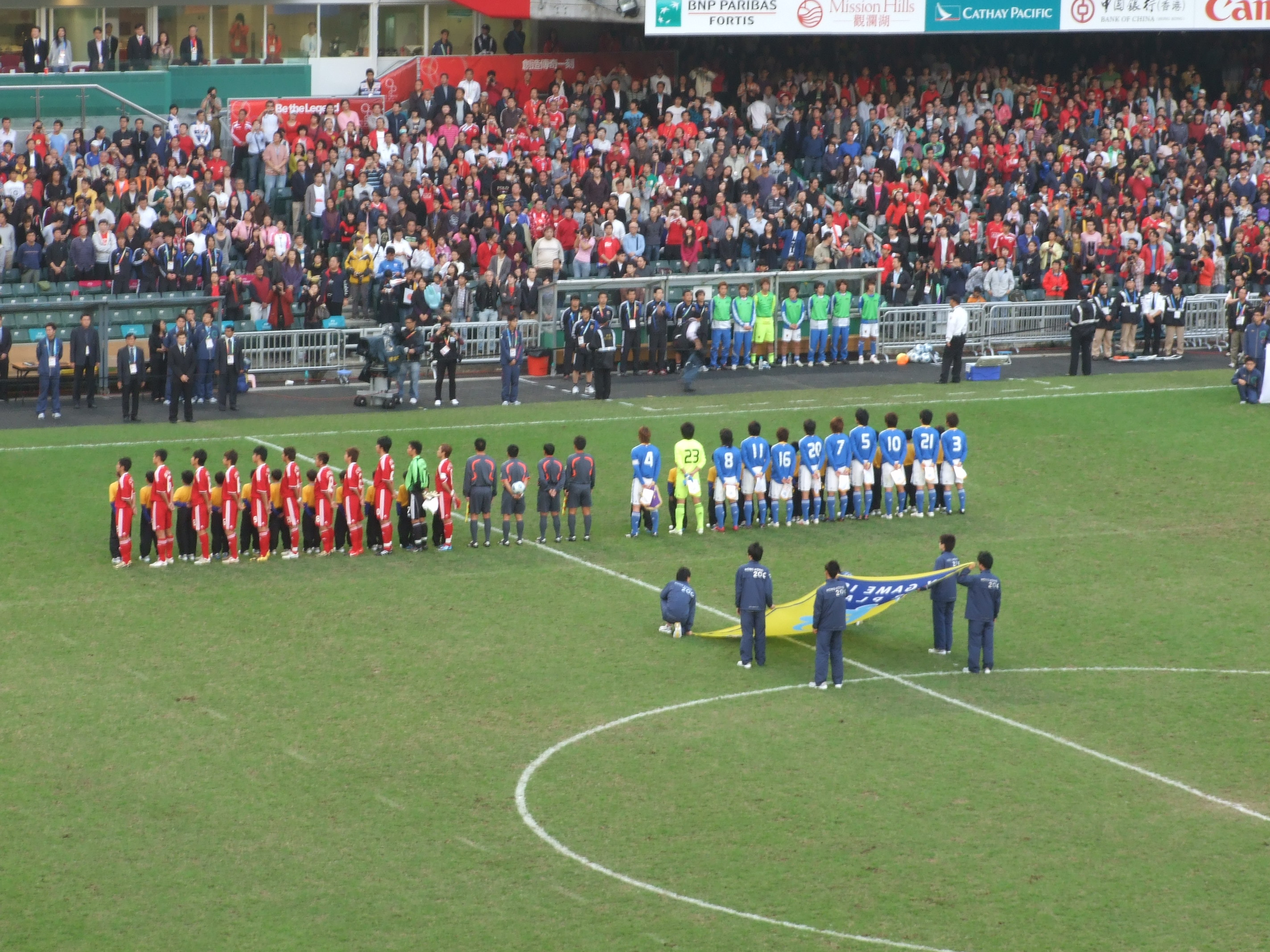
Lineups of the two teams in the gold medal match

Semi-finals
10 December - Hong Kong Stadium
Japan	2
South Korea	1
10 December - Hong Kong Stadium
Hong Kong	1(4)
North Korea	1(2)

Final
12 December - Hong Kong Stadium
Japan	1(2)
Hong Kong	1(4)
Third place
12 December - Hong Kong Stadium
South Korea	1(4)
North Korea	1(2)

=== Semi-finals ===
10 December 2009
UTC+8 17:00

Japan	2 – 1 (a.e.t.)	South Korea
Yamamoto 9'; Nagai 120+1'	Report by EAG; Report by HKFA	Kim Ho-you 21'

Hong Kong Stadium, Hong Kong
Attendance: 7,534
Referee: Ramachandran Krishnan (Malaysia)

10 December 2009
UTC+8 20:00

Hong Kong	1 – 1 (a.e.t.)	North Korea
Chan Wai Ho 44'	Report by EAG; Report by HKFA	Pak Kwang-ryong 85'
Penalties
Au Yeung Yiu Chung (penalty scored); Chan Wai Ho (penalty scored); Lee Chi Ho (penalty scored); Yuen Kin Man (penalty scored)	4 – 2	(penalty scored) Pak Song-chol; (penalty missed) Ri Kwang-hyok; (penalty scored) Jon Kwang-ik; (penalty missed) Kim Kwang-hyok

Hong Kong Stadium, Hong Kong
Attendance: 9,482
Referee: Win Cho (Myanmar)

=== Bronze medal match ===
12 December 2009
UTC+8 13:00

South Korea	1 – 1	North Korea
Go Min-gi 24'	Report by EAG; Report by HKFA	Pak Song-chol 52'
Penalties
Go Min-gi (penalty scored); Woo Joo-young (penalty scored); Jung Jae-suk (penalty scored); Lee Jae-young (penalty scored)	4 – 2	(penalty scored) Choe Myong-ho; (penalty scored) Pak Song-chol; (penalty missed) Jon Kwang-ik; (penalty missed) Kim Kuk-jin

Hong Kong Stadium, Hong Kong
Attendance: 28,246
Referee: Sukhbir Singh (Singapore)

=== Gold medal match ===
12 December 2009
UTC+8 16:00

Japan	1 – 1 (a.e.t.)	Hong Kong
Muramatsu 22'	Report by EAG; Report by HKFA	Chan Siu Ki 47'
Penalties
Nagai (penalty scored); Otsuka (penalty missed); Suzuki (penalty missed); Aoki (penalty scored)	2 – 4	(penalty missed) Au Yeung Yiu Chung; (penalty scored) Chan Siu Ki; (penalty scored) Chan Wai Ho; (penalty scored) Lee Chi Ho; (penalty scored) Wong Chin Hung

Hong Kong Stadium, Hong Kong
Attendance: 31,884
Referee: Phùng Đình Dũng (Vietnam)

Japan	Hong Kong

GK	23	Takuya Matsumoto
RB	3	Shoma Kamata	(yellow card) 101'
CB	5	Kazuya Yamamura
CB	4	Daisuke Suzuki (c)
LB	7	Taisuke Muramatsu
RM	16	Hiroki Kawano		(substituted off) 102'
CM	11	Takuya Aoki
CM	10	Kosuke Yamamoto	(yellow card) 90+1'	(substituted off) 111'
LM	8	Yusuke Higa
CF	21	Yuya Osako	(yellow card) 44'	(substituted off) 77'
CF	20	Kensuke Nagai	(yellow card) 33'
Substitutes:
GK	1	Koki Otani
DF	6	Shunya Suganuma
DF	13	Kenta Uchida
DF	19	Kyohei Noborizato
FW	14	Keisuke Endo		(substituted on) 102'
FW	17	Yoichiro Kakitani		(substituted on) 111'
FW	22	Shohei Otsuka		(substituted on) 77'
Not playing:
GK	18	Takuya Masuda
DF	2	Takefumi Toma
DF	12	Taisuke Nakamura
MF	9	Yosuke Kawai
FW	15	Yuki Oshitani
Manager:
Akihiro Nishimura

GK	17	Yapp Hung Fai	(yellow card) 107'
RB	21	Tsang Kam To		(substituted off) 78'
CB	2	Lee Chi Ho
CB	15	Chan Wai Ho
LB	6	Wong Chin Hung
DM	16	Leung Chun Pong	(yellow card) 90+2'	(substituted off) 117'
RM	8	Xu Deshuai
LM	18	Kwok Kin Pong	(yellow card) 67'
AM	10	Au Yeung Yiu Chung (c)
CF	20	Chao Pengfei
CF	9	Cheng Lai Hin		(substituted off) 46'
Substitutes:
GK	1	Li Hon Ho
DF	5	Lai Man Fei
DF	14	Chan Siu Yuen
DF	25	So Wai Chuen		(substituted on) 78'
MF	4	Yuen Kin Man		(substituted on) 117'
MF	19	Hinson Leung
FW	7	Chan Siu Ki	(yellow card) 97'	(substituted on) 46'
Not playing:
GK	22	Ng Yat Hoi
DF	3	Fung Kai Hong
DF	12	Lau Nim Yat (injured)
MF	11	Lai Yiu Cheong
MF	28	Ip Chung Long
Manager:
(South Korea) Kim Pan-gon

Assistant referees:

- Nguyễn Ngọc Hà (Vietnam)
- Lee Hung-ping (Chinese Taipei)

Fourth official:

- Win Cho (Myanmar)

Match rules:

- 90 minutes.
- 30 minutes of extra time if necessary.
- Penalty shoot-out if scores still level.
- Seven named substitutes, of which up to three may be used.

== Medalists ==
Event	Gold	Silver	Bronze
Football	Hong Kong	Japan	South Korea
