= Football at the 2013 East Asian Games =

Tournament details
- Host country: China
- Dates: October 6 ~ 14
- Teams: 6
- Venue: 3 (in 1 host city)

Final positions
- Champions: North Korea (men); North Korea (women)
- Runners-up: South Korea (men); China (women)
- Third place: Japan (men); Japan (women)
- Fourth place: Hong Kong (men); Chinese Taipei (women)

Tournament statistics
- Matches played: 16
- Goals scored: 61 (3.81 per match)

The football tournament at the 2013 East Asian Games was the sixth edition of East Asian Games football tournament. It was held in Tianjin, China from 6 October to 14, 2013.

The men's football games required the age of players should be under 23. No requirement for women's.

The matches were played at Tianjin, China, from 6 to 14 October 2013 (all times UTC+8:00).

== Men's tournament ==
Team	Pld	W	D	L	GF	GA	GD	Pts
North Korea U-23	4	3	1	0	12	5	+7	10
South Korea U-23	4	2	1	1	12	8	+4	7
Japan U-20	4	2	1	1	8	4	+4	7
Hong Kong U-23	4	0	2	2	2	11	−9	2
China U-20	4	0	1	3	1	7	−6	1

October 6, 2013
19:30

China	1–2	South Korea
Shen Tianfeng 20'		Kim Sun-min 34'; Kwak Rae-seung 39'

Tuanbo Football Stadium, Tianjin
Referee: Sivakorn Pu-Udom (Thailand)

October 6, 2013
19:30

Japan	1–2	North Korea
Asano 30'		Sim Hyon-jin 41'; Kim Ju-song 42'

Haihe Educational Football Stadium, Tianjin
Referee: Tan Hai (China)

October 8, 2013
19:30

Hong Kong	0–0	China

Tuanbo Football Stadium, Tianjin

October 8, 2013
19:30

South Korea	2–5	Japan
Kwak Rae-seung 25'; Kim Jung-joo 57'		Suzuki 18', 83'; Yajima 32'; Sakaki 36'; Asano 67'

Haihe Educational Football Stadium, Tianjin

October 10, 2013
19:30

North Korea	2–2	South Korea
Pak Kwang-ryong 19', 26'		Kim Sun-min 42'; Choi Young-kwang 90+4'

Tuanbo Football Stadium, Tianjin

October 10, 2013
19:30

Japan	0–0	Hong Kong

Haihe Educational Football Stadium, Tianjin

October 12, 2013
19:30

China	0–2	Japan
		Asano 42'; Suzuki 43'

Tuanbo Football Stadium, Tianjin

October 12, 2013
19:30

Hong Kong	2–5	North Korea
Fong Pak Lun 38'; Cheung Kwok Ming 87'		Ro Hak-su 21'; Jong Il-gwan 25'; Pak Kwang-ryong 28'; Kim Ju-song 60'; Ri Hyok-chol 83'

Haihe Educational Football Stadium, Tianjin

October 14, 2013
15:00

South Korea	6–0	Hong Kong
Choi Gwon-su 4'; Cho Jun-jae 21'; Leung Kwun Chung 24' (o.g.); Kim Sun-min 63', 66', 75'

Olympic Center Stadium, Tianjin

October 14, 2013
19:30

China	0–3	North Korea
		Kim Ju-song 45'; Jong Il-gwan 52'; Pak Kwang-ryon 64'

Olympic Center Stadium, Tianjin

== Women's tournament ==
Team	Pld	W	D	L	GF	GA	GD	Pts
North Korea U-23	3	3	0	0	10	0	+10	9
China U-23	3	1	1	1	4	3	+1	4
Japan U-23	3	1	0	2	8	6	+2	3
Chinese Taipei	3	0	1	2	4	17	−13	1

October 7, 2013
15:00

China	0–1	North Korea

Tuanbo Football Stadium, Tianjin

October 7, 2013
15:00

Japan	8–2	Chinese Taipei
Uemura 10', 14', 35'; Kira 30'; Saito 42'; Noichi 63'; Nakada 64'; Sugasawa 73'		Yang Ya Han 45'; Lin Ya Hui 79'

Haihe Educational Football Stadium, Tianjin

October 9, 2013
15:00

China	2–0	Japan
Li Ying 43'; Xu Yanlu 74'

Tuanbo Football Stadium, Tianjin

October 9, 2013
15:00

North Korea	7–0	Chinese Taipei

Haihe Educational Football Stadium, Tianjin

October 11, 2013
15:00

Japan	0–2	North Korea
		Ho Un Byol 27'; Jang Hyon Sun 38'

Haihe Educational Football Stadium, Tianjin

October 11, 2013
19:30

China	2–2	Chinese Taipei

Tuanbo Football Stadium, Tianjin
