= Kim Sun-min =

South Korean footballer (born 1991)

Personal information
- Date of birth: December 12, 1991 (age 34)
- Place of birth: Suwon, South Korea
- Height: 1.66 m (5 ft 5 1/2 in)
- Position: Midfielder

Team information
- Current team: Chungbuk Cheongju
- Number: 5

Youth career
- 2007–2009: Suwon Technical High School
- 2010: Yewon Arts University

Senior career*
| Years | Team | Apps | (Gls) |
| 2011–2012 | Gainare Tottori | 25 | (1) |
| 2013 | Ulsan Hyundai Mipo | 14 | (10) |
| 2014–2015 | Ulsan Hyundai | 18 | (0) |
| 2015 | → FC Anyang (loan) | 32 | (6) |
| 2016 | Daejeon Citizen | 30 | (4) |
| 2017–2020 | Daegu FC | 61 | (0) |
| 2018–2019 | → Asan Mugunghwa (army) | 6 | (0) |
| 2021–2022 | Seoul E-Land FC | 71 | (2) |
| 2023 | Suwon FC | 4 | (0) |
| 2024– | Chungbuk Cheongju | 89 | (3) |
- * Club domestic league appearances and goals as of 6 August 2026

- Kim Sun-min
- Hangul: 김선민
- Hanja: 金善珉
- RR: Gim Seonmin
- MR: Kim Sŏnmin

Kim Sun-min (Korean: 김선민; born December 12, 1991) is a South Korean football player who plays for Chungbuk Cheongju.

== Club statistics ==
| Club performance | | | League | | Cup | | Total | |
| Season | Club | League | Apps | Goals | Apps | Goals | Apps | Goals |
| Japan | | | League | | Emperor's Cup | | Total | |
|---|---|---|---|---|---|---|---|---|
| 2011 | Gainare Tottori | J2 League | 17 | 1 | 2 | 1 | 19 | 2 |
| 2012 | Gainare Tottori | J2 League | | | | | | |
| Country | Japan | | 17 | 1 | 2 | 1 | 19 | 2 |
| Total | | | 17 | 1 | 2 | 1 | 19 | 2 |
