= Hong Kong national under-23 football team =

Hong Kong under-23
- Nickname(s): 蛟龍 (The Dragons) 勁揪 (The Strength)
- Association: Hong Kong Football Association (HKFA)
- Confederation: AFC (Asia)
- Sub-confederation: EAFF (East Asia)
- Home stadium: Hong Kong Stadium; Mong Kok Stadium
First colours	Second colours

Biggest win
- Hong Kong 8–1 Macau (Hong Kong, 29 May 2005); Macau 0–7 Hong Kong (Macau, 3 November 2005)

Biggest defeat
- Uzbekistan 10–0 Hong Kong (Tashkent, Uzbekistan; 9 September 2023)

Asian Games
- Appearances: 7 (first in 2002)
- Best result: Fourth place (2022)
Medal record
Men's football
East Asian Games
Gold medal – first place	2009 Hong Kong	Team

The Hong Kong Olympic Football Team (also known as Hong Kong under-23 or Hong Kong U-23) represents Hong Kong in international football competitions in the Olympic Games, the Asian Games, as well as any other under-23 international football tournaments. In the past the team also represented Hong Kong in the East Asian Games until termination of the Games. It is committed by the Football Association of Hong Kong, China.

== Competition history ==
Denotes draws includes knockout matches decided on penalty kicks.

=== Olympic Games record ===
Before 1992, see Hong Kong national football team

Olympic Games Record									Qualifications Record					
Hosts / Year	Result	Position	GP	W	D*	L	GS	GA	GP	W	D	L	GS	GA
(Spain) 1992	Did not qualify								6	2	3	1	6	6
(United States) 1996	Did not qualify								4	0	0	4	1	17
(Australia) 2000	Did not qualify								8	4	1	3	14	12
(Greece) 2004	Did not qualify								4	2	0	2	3	3
(China) 2008	Did not qualify								8	2	0	5	5	15
(United Kingdom) 2012	Did not qualify								4	2	0	2	7	3
(Brazil) 2016	Did not qualify								3	0	0	3	2	11
(Japan) 2020	Did not qualify								3	1	1	1	2	3
(France) 2024	Did not qualify								3	0	1	2	0	13
(United States) 2028	To be determined								To be determined					
Total	—	—	—	—	—	—	—	—	40	13	6	23	40	83

=== AFC U-23 Asian Cup ===
AFC U-22/23 Championship, AFC U-23 Asian Cup Record									Qualifications Record					
Hosts / Year	Result	Position	GP	W	D*	L	GS	GA	GP	W	D	L	GS	GA
(Oman) 2013	Did not qualify								5	0	0	5	3	15
(Qatar) 2016	Did not qualify								3	0	0	3	2	11
(China) 2018	Did not qualify								3	1	2	0	6	2
(Thailand) 2020	Did not qualify								3	1	1	1	2	3
(Uzbekistan) 2022	Did not qualify								2	0	0	2	2	8
(Qatar) 2024	Did not qualify								3	0	1	2	0	13
(Saudi Arabia) 2026	Did not qualify								3	1	0	2	1	6
(Japan) 2028	To be determined								To be determined					
Total	—	—	—	—	—	—	—	—	19	3	3	13	16	45

=== Asian Games record ===
Before 2002, see Hong Kong national football team

Asian Games Record
Hosts/Year	Result	Position	GP	W	D*	L	GS	GA
(South Korea) 2002	First round	13	3	1	0	2	4	3
(Qatar) 2006	First round	12	3	1	1	1	3	3
(China) 2010	Round of 16	10	4	2	1	1	6	5
(South Korea) 2014	Round of 16	11	4	2	1	1	5	6
(Indonesia) 2018	Round of 16	14	5	2	1	2	9	8
(China) 2022	Fourth place	4	6	2	0	4	3	11
(Japan) 2026	Group stage	15	3	0	0	3	1	11
(Qatar) 2030	To be determined							
(Saudi Arabia) 2034	To be determined							
Total	Fourth place	7/7	28	10	4	14	31	47

† Excluding 1998 backwards

Asian Games History
Year	Round	Score	Result
(South Korea) 2002	First round	Hong Kong 1–2 North Korea	Loss
(South Korea) 2002	First round	Hong Kong 0–1 Kuwait	Loss
(South Korea) 2002	First round	Hong Kong 3–0 Pakistan	Win
(Qatar) 2006	First round	Hong Kong 1–1 India	Draw
(Qatar) 2006	First round	Hong Kong 0–1 Iran	Loss
(Qatar) 2006	First round	Hong Kong 3–0 Maldives	Win
(China) 2010	First round	Hong Kong 1–1 United Arab Emirates	Draw
(China) 2010	First round	Hong Kong 1–0 Uzbekistan	Win
(China) 2010	First round	Hong Kong 4–1 Bangladesh	Win
(China) 2010	Round of 16	Hong Kong 0–3 Oman	Loss
(South Korea) 2014	First round	Hong Kong 1–1 Uzbekistan	Draw
(South Korea) 2014	First round	Hong Kong 2–1 Afghanistan	Win
(South Korea) 2014	First round	Hong Kong 2–1 Bangladesh	Win
(South Korea) 2014	Round of 16	Hong Kong 0–3 South Korea	Loss
(Indonesia) 2018	Group Stage	Hong Kong 3–1 Laos	Win
(Indonesia) 2018	Group stage	Hong Kong 4–0 Chinese Taipei	Win
(Indonesia) 2018	Group stage	Hong Kong 1–1 Palestine	Draw
(Indonesia) 2018	Group stage	Hong Kong 1–3 Indonesia	Loss
(Indonesia) 2018	Round of 16	Hong Kong 0–3 Uzbekistan	Loss
(China) 2022	Group stage	Hong Kong 0–1 Uzbekistan	Loss
(China) 2022	Group stage	Hong Kong 1–2 Uzbekistan	Loss
(China) 2022	Round of 16	Hong Kong 1–0 Palestine	Win
(China) 2022	Quarter Final	Hong Kong 1–0 Iran	Win
(China) 2022	Semi Final	Hong Kong 0–4 Japan	Loss
(China) 2022	3rd place	Hong Kong 0–4 Uzbekistan	Loss
(Japan) 2026	Group stage	Hong Kong 0–2 Japan	Loss
(Japan) 2026	Group stage	Hong Kong 1–5 Thailand	Loss
(Japan) 2026	Group stage	Hong Kong 0–4 Kyrgyzstan	Loss

=== East Asian Games record ===
East Asian Games Record
Hosts / Year	Result	Position	GP	W	D*	L	GS	GA
(China) 1993 to (Japan) 2001	Did not enter							
(Macau) 2005	First round	5	3	1	0	2	4	3
(Hong Kong) 2009	Champions	1	4	1	2	1	6	4
(China) 2013	Fourth place	4	4	0	2	2	2	11
Total	1 title	3/6	11	2	4	5	12	18

East Asian Games History
Year	Round	Score	Result
(Macau) 2005	First round	Hong Kong 0–0 North Korea	Draw
(Macau) 2005	First round	Hong Kong 0–2 China	Loss
(Macau) 2005	First round	Hong Kong 7–0 Macau	Win
(Hong Kong) 2009	First round	Hong Kong 4–1 South Korea	Win
(Hong Kong) 2009	First round	Hong Kong 0–1 China	Loss
(Hong Kong) 2009	Semi-final	Hong Kong 1–1 North Korea	Draw
(Hong Kong) 2009	Final	Hong Kong 1–1 Japan	Draw
(China) 2013	Group Stage	Hong Kong 0–0 China	Draw
(China) 2013	Group Stage	Hong Kong 0–0 Japan	Draw
(China) 2013	Group Stage	Hong Kong 2–5 North Korea	Loss
(China) 2013	Group Stage	Hong Kong 0–6 South Korea	Loss

== Results and fixtures ==
=== 2026 ===
12 June Friendly	China	4–0	Hong Kong	China
16:00 UTC+8

15 June Friendly	China	3–0	Hong Kong	China
16:00 UTC+8

16 September 2026 Asian Games GS	Japan	2–0	Hong Kong	Toyota, Japan
19:30 UTC+9	Hisatsugu Ishii 39'; Shuto Nagano 89'	Report		Stadium: Toyota Stadium; Attendance: 7,720; Referee: Tuan Yaasin (Malaysia)

20 September 2026 Asian Games GS	Hong Kong	1–5	Thailand	Toyota, Japan
16:00 UTC+9	Wu Chun Ming 14'	Report	Thanakrit 39'; Paripan 54'; Tsang Yi Hang 56' (o.g.); Jehhanafee 76'; Worawut 84'	Stadium: Toyota Stadium; Attendance: 10,439; Referee: Hanna Hattab (Syria)

23 September 2026 Asian Games GS	Kyrgyzstan	4–0	Hong Kong	Kariya, Japan
19:30 UTC+9				Stadium: Wave Stadium Kariya; Attendance: 1,187

== Coaching staff ==
Position	Name
Head coach	(Hong Kong) Tsang Chiu Tat
Technical director	Vacant
Executive manager	(Hong Kong) Graeme Chan
Assistant coach	(Hong Kong) Jaimes McKee
Goalkeeping coach	(Hong Kong) Liu Chun Fai
Head of Sports Science	(England) Mathew Pears
Head of Performance Analysis	(Republic of Ireland) Christopher Jenkins
Team Doctor	(Hong Kong) Wan Hay Man Keith
Equipment Team	(Hong Kong) Cheung Tim Ho Andrew
Equipment Team	(Hong Kong) Samuel Chow
Physiotherapist	(Hong Kong) Lo Ho Cheung
Physiotherapist	(Hong Kong) Kwong Hoi Hang Karen
Physiotherapist	(Hong Kong) Leung Hok Hin Frankie

== Current squad ==
The following 23 players were named in the final squad for 2026 Asian Games. Names in bold denote players who have been capped for the senior team.

No.	Pos.	Player	Date of birth (age)	Club
1	GK	Cheung Kwai Wa	2 January 2003 (age 23)	(Football Association of Hong Kong, China) Kowloon City
18	GK	Chan Kun Sun	13 August 2004 (age 22)	(Football Association of Hong Kong, China) North District
19	GK	Poon Sheung Hei	29 September 2006 (age 20)	(Football Association of Hong Kong, China) HKFC
2	DF	Krisna Korani	2 March 2004 (age 22)	(Football Association of Hong Kong, China) Eastern District
3	DF	Sung Wang Ngai	2 December 2003 (age 22)	(Football Association of Hong Kong, China) Eastern District
4	DF	Tsang Yi Hang	27 October 2003 (age 23)	(Football Association of Hong Kong, China) Lee Man
5	DF	**Hélio**	31 January 1986 (age 40)	(Football Association of Hong Kong, China) Eastern District
12	DF	Kwok Chun Nok	6 March 2004 (age 22)	(Football Association of Hong Kong, China) Kowloon City
13	DF	Tsang Lok To	15 July 2005 (age 21)	(United States Soccer Federation) Vermont Catamounts
14	DF	Loong Tsz Hin	8 August 2004 (age 22)	(Football Association of Hong Kong, China) Eastern
15	DF	Yim Kai Cheuk	12 April 2004 (age 22)	(Football Association of Hong Kong, China) Kowloon City
6	MF	**Wu Chun Ming**	21 November 1997 (age 28)	(Football Association of Hong Kong, China) Lee Man
7	MF	**Ma Hei Wai**	3 February 2004 (age 22)	(Chinese Football Association) Shaanxi Union
8	MF	**Ngan Cheuk Pan**	22 January 1998 (age 28)	(Chinese Football Association) Qiangdao Hainiu
10	MF	**Sohgo Ichikawa**	30 July 2004 (age 22)	(Football Association of Hong Kong, China) Lee Man
22	MF	Chin Yu Ho	13 February 2008 (age 18)	(Portuguese Football Federation) Oriental
9	FW	**Michael Udebuluzor**	11 April 2004 (age 22)	(Football Association of Hong Kong, China) Lee Man
11	FW	**Anthony Pinto**	1 December 2006 (age 19)	(The Football Association) Loughborough Students
16	FW	Chen Ngo Hin	27 February 2003 (age 23)	(Football Association of Hong Kong, China) Kowloon City
17	FW	**Ng Yu Hei**	13 February 2006 (age 20)	(Chinese Football Association) Chongqing Tonglianglong
20	FW	Matthew Slattery	5 April 2005 (age 21)	(Football Association of Hong Kong, China) Kowloon City
21	FW	Lee Chun Ting	1 June 2005 (age 21)	(Football Association of Hong Kong, China) Eastern
23	FW	Lee Lok Him	18 April 2004 (age 22)	(Football Association of Hong Kong, China) Eastern

=== Recent call-ups ===
The following players have been called up for the team within the previous 12 months.

Pos.	Player	Date of birth (age)	Caps	Goals	Club	Latest call-up
GK	Chung Hoi Man	2 January 2003 (age 23)			(Hong Kong) Eastern	Training camp, 10–15 November 2025
DF	Wong Ching In	13 January 2004 (age 22)			(Hong Kong) Yuen Long	Training camp, 10–15 November 2025
DF	**Kam Chi Kin**	6 March 2004 (age 22)			(Hong Kong) Kitchee	Training camp, 10–15 November 2025
DF	Law Cheuk Hei	12 November 2004 (age 22)			(Hong Kong) Kowloon City	Training camp, 10–15 November 2025
DF	Li Wing Ho	18 June 2004 (age 22)			(Hong Kong) Rangers	Training camp, 10–15 November 2025
MF	Yung Ho	14 September 2004 (age 22)			(Hong Kong) Rangers	Training camp, 10–15 November 2025
MF	**Jay Haddow**	2 April 2004 (age 22)			(Hong Kong) Kitchee	Training camp, 10–15 November 2025
MF	Marco Pirie	12 January 2005 (age 21)			(Hong Kong) Eastern District	Training camp, 10–15 November 2025
FW	Yeung Cheuk Kwan	1 December 2006 (age 19)			(Hong Kong) Eastern District	Training camp, 10–15 November 2025
FW	Yau Cheuk Fung	31 August 2004 (age 22)			(Hong Kong) Sham Shui Po	Training camp, 10–15 November 2025

^{INJ} Player withdrew from the squad due to an injury
^{PRE} Preliminary squad
^{WD} Player withdrawn from the squad.
^{RET} Player retired from international football

== See also ==
- Hong Kong national football team
- Hong Kong national under-20 football team
- Hong Kong national under-17 football team
- Football Association of Hong Kong, China
- Football in Hong Kong
- Sport in Hong Kong
- Hong Kong

Awards
Preceded by Hong Kong national track cycling team	Hong Kong Sports Stars Awards; Team Only Sport; 2009	Succeeded by Hong Kong national rugby sevens team
