= Football at the 2001 East Asian Games =

The football tournament at the 2001 East Asian Games was held from 19 to 27 May 2001. The tournament was played by the U-23 men's national teams.

== Venues ==
- Osaka Expo '70 Stadium
- Nagai Stadium
- Tsurumi-Ryokuchi Stadium

== Group stage ==
=== Group A ===
Team	Pld	W	D	L	GF	GA	GD	Pts
Australia	2	2	0	0	7	0	+7	6
Japan	2	1	0	1	6	1	+5	3
Guam	2	0	0	2	0	12	−12	0

2001-05-19

Japan	6 – 0	Guam

Osaka Expo '70 Stadium, Osaka

2001-05-21

Australia	1 – 0	Japan

Osaka Expo '70 Stadium, Osaka

2001-05-23

Australia	6 – 0	Guam

Tsurumi-Ryokuchi Stadium, Osaka

=== Group B ===
Team	Pld	W	D	L	GF	GA	GD	Pts
South Korea	3	2	1	0	6	2	+4	7
Kazakhstan	3	2	0	1	14	2	+12	6
Macau	3	1	1	1	4	5	−1	4
Mongolia	3	0	0	3	1	16	−15	0

2001-05-19

Kazakhstan	5 – 0	Macau

Tsurumi-Ryokuchi Stadium, Osaka

2001-05-19

South Korea	4 – 1	Mongolia

Osaka Expo '70 Stadium, Osaka

2001-05-21

Kazakhstan	8 – 0	Mongolia

Tsurumi-Ryokuchi Stadium, Osaka

2001-05-21

South Korea	0 – 0	Macau

Osaka Expo '70 Stadium, Osaka

2001-05-23

Macau	4 – 0	Mongolia

Osaka Expo '70 Stadium, Osaka

2001-05-23

South Korea	2 – 1	Kazakhstan

Osaka Expo '70 Stadium, Osaka

== Knockout stage ==
Semi-finals
25 May - Osaka Expo '70 Stadium
South Korea	1 (3)
Japan (pen)	1 (4)
25 May - Osaka Expo '70 Stadium
Australia	1
Kazakhstan	0

Final
27 May - Nagai Stadium
Japan	2
Australia	1
Third place
27 May - Nagai Stadium
South Korea	4
Kazakhstan	1

=== Semi-finals ===
2001-05-25

South Korea	1 – 1 (a.e.t.)	Japan
Penalties
	3 – 4

Osaka Expo '70 Stadium, Osaka

2001-05-25

Australia	1 – 0	Kazakhstan

Osaka Expo '70 Stadium, Osaka

=== Third place match ===
2001-05-27

South Korea	4 – 1	Kazakhstan

Nagai Stadium, Osaka

=== Final ===
2001-05-27

Japan	2 – 1	Australia

Nagai Stadium, Osaka

== Medalists ==
Event	Gold	Silver	Bronze
Football	Japan	South Korea	Kazakhstan

Australia parted as guest, so Korea Republic and Kazakhstan were awarded 2nd and 3rd respectively.
