= Football at the 2005 East Asian Games =

Tournament details
- Host country: Macau
- Dates: 29 October – 6 November
- Teams: 7 (from 1 confederation)
- Venue(s): 2 (in 1 host city)

Final positions
- Champions: China (1st title)
- Runners-up: North Korea
- Third place: Japan
- Fourth place: South Korea

Tournament statistics
- Matches played: 13
- Goals scored: 48 (3.69 per match)

The football tournament at the 2005 East Asian Games was held on 29 October to 6 November. The tournament is played by U-23 men national teams.

== Venues ==
- Estádio Campo Desportivo (Macau Stadium)
- Macau University of Science and Technology Sports Field

== Group stage ==
=== Group A ===
| Team | Pld | W | D | L | GF | GA | GD | Pts |
|---|---|---|---|---|---|---|---|---|
| Japan | 2 | 2 | 0 | 0 | 8 | 1 | +7 | 6 |
| South Korea | 2 | 1 | 0 | 1 | 3 | 2 | +1 | 3 |
| Chinese Taipei | 2 | 0 | 0 | 2 | 1 | 9 | −8 | 0 |

29 October 2005

| Japan | 6–1 | Chinese Taipei |

Macau UST S.F., Macau
31 October 2005

| Chinese Taipei | 0–3 | South Korea |

Macau UST S.F., Macau
2 November 2005

| South Korea | 0–2 | Japan |

Estádio Campo Desportivo, Macau

=== Group B ===
| Team | Pld | W | D | L | GF | GA | GD | Pts |
|---|---|---|---|---|---|---|---|---|
| North Korea | 3 | 2 | 1 | 0 | 16 | 1 | +15 | 7 |
| China | 3 | 2 | 0 | 1 | 13 | 3 | +10 | 6 |
| Hong Kong | 3 | 1 | 1 | 1 | 7 | 2 | +5 | 4 |
| Macau | 3 | 0 | 0 | 3 | 0 | 30 | −30 | 0 |

30 October 2005

| North Korea | 0–0 | Hong Kong |

Macau UST S.F., Macau
30 October 2005

| China | 10–0 | Macau |

Macau UST S.F., Macau
1 November 2005

| North Korea | 13–0 | Macau |

Macau UST S.F., Macau
1 November 2005

| Hong Kong | 0–2 | China |

Macau UST S.F., Macau
3 November 2005

| North Korea | 3–1 | China |

Estádio Campo Desportivo, Macau
3 November 2005

| Macau | 0–7 | Hong Kong |

Macau UST S.F., Macau

== Knockout stage ==
Semi-finals
5 November – Estádio Campo Desportivo
Japan | 1
China | 2
5 November – Estádio Campo Desportivo
North Korea | 2
South Korea | 0

Final
6 November – Estádio Campo Desportivo
China | 1
North Korea | 0
Third place
6 November – Estádio Campo Desportivo
Japan | 4
South Korea | 1

=== Semi-finals ===
5 November 2005

| North Korea | 2–0 | South Korea |

Estádio Campo Desportivo, Macau
5 November 2005

| Japan | 1–2 | China |

Estádio Campo Desportivo, Macau

=== Third place match ===
6 November 2005

| Japan | 4–1 | South Korea |

Estádio Campo Desportivo, Macau

=== Final ===
6 November 2005

| China | 1–0 | North Korea |

Estádio Campo Desportivo, Macau

== Medalists ==
| Event | Gold | Silver | Bronze |
|---|---|---|---|
| Football | China | North Korea | Japan |
