= Football at the 1993 East Asian Games =

Football at the 1993 East Asian Games refers to a football tournament held during the East Asian Games. All matches were played in Shanghai, China PR in May 1993. South Korea, which remained undefeated through the tournament and conceded only one goal in 5 matches, topped the points table.

== Final table ==
Team	Pld	W	D	L	GF	GA	GD	Pts
South Korea B	5	4	1	0	29	1	+28	9
North Korea	5	3	2	0	17	2	+15	8
China	5	3	1	1	21	5	+16	7
Japan B	5	2	0	3	30	10	+20	4
Mongolia	5	1	0	4	5	35	−30	2
Macau	5	0	0	5	3	52	−49	0

== Results ==
Matchday 1

1993-05-10

North Korea	2 – 0	Japan B

Shanghai, China PR

1993-05-10

South Korea B	12 – 0	Macau

Shanghai, China PR

1993-05-10

China	6 – 1	Mongolia

Shanghai, China PR

Matchday 2

1993-05-12

South Korea B	5 – 0	Japan B

Shanghai, China PR

1993-05-12

North Korea	7 – 0	Mongolia

Shanghai, China PR

1993-05-12

China	11 – 0	Macau

Shanghai, China PR

Matchday 3

1993-05-14

South Korea B	10 – 0	Mongolia

Shanghai, China PR

1993-05-14

Japan B	19 – 0	Macau

Shanghai, China PR

1993-05-14

China	1 – 1	North Korea

Shanghai, China PR

Matchday 4

1993-05-16

North Korea	6 – 0	Macau

Shanghai, China PR

1993-05-16

South Korea B	1 – 0	China

Shanghai, China PR

1993-05-16

Japan B	9 – 0	Mongolia

Shanghai, China PR

Matchday 5

1993-05-18

Mongolia	4 – 3	Macau

Shanghai, China PR

1993-05-18

South Korea B	1 – 1	North Korea

Shanghai, China PR

1993-05-18

China	3 – 2	Japan B

Shanghai, China PR

== Medalists ==
Event	Gold	Silver	Bronze
Football	South Korea	North Korea	China
