= Football at the 2008 Summer Olympics – Men's qualification =

The men's qualification for football tournament at the 2008 Summer Olympics. FIFA restricted entry to players born after January 1, 1985.

== Qualifications ==
A total of sixteen teams participated in the finals of the Olympic tournament for men. These finals were

- The host nation (automatically qualified)
  - China
- Four teams from Europe
  - Netherlands
  - Serbia
  - Belgium
  - Italy
- Two teams from South America
  - Brazil
  - Argentina
- Two teams from North America, Central America, and the Caribbean
  - Honduras
  - United States
- Three teams from Africa
  - Cameroon
  - Ivory Coast
  - Nigeria
- Three teams from Asia
  - Australia
  - Japan
  - South Korea
- One team from Oceania
  - New Zealand

== UEFA (Europe) ==
UEFA announced that the 2007 UEFA European Under-21 Football Championship tournament in the Netherlands would also serve as the qualifying tournament for the Olympics. The four semi-finalists from this tournament were awarded UEFA's four places.

The Netherlands was the first European country to qualify for the Olympics as winner of their group, it will be their first appearance since 1952. Serbia was the second European country to qualify for the Olympics as winner of the other group while Belgium qualified after reaching the semi-finals. The fourth semi-finalist was England; however, because England competes at the Olympic Games as part of Great Britain which does not compete in football, the next two highest ranked teams in the tournament, Italy and Portugal, contested a playoff for the final place, which was won by Italy.

== CONMEBOL (South America) ==
The 2007 South American Youth Championship tournament in Paraguay, held in January 2007, served as the qualifying tournament for the Olympics. Brazil and Argentina finished first and second, respectively, and qualified for the Olympic tournament.

== CONCACAF (North, Central America and Caribbean) ==
Honduras and United States qualified to the Olympic Games as CONCACAF representatives by advancing to the final of the 2008 CONCACAF Men's Pre-Olympic Tournament.

== CAF (Africa) ==
Cameroon, Ivory Coast, and Nigeria qualified at the 2008 CAF Men's Pre-Olympic Tournament.

== AFC (Asia) ==
Australia, Japan, and South Korea qualified.

== OFC (Oceania) ==
New Zealand qualified by winning the 2008 OFC Men's Olympic Football Tournament.
