= Siu Sai Wan Sports Ground =

Sports venue in Hong Kong

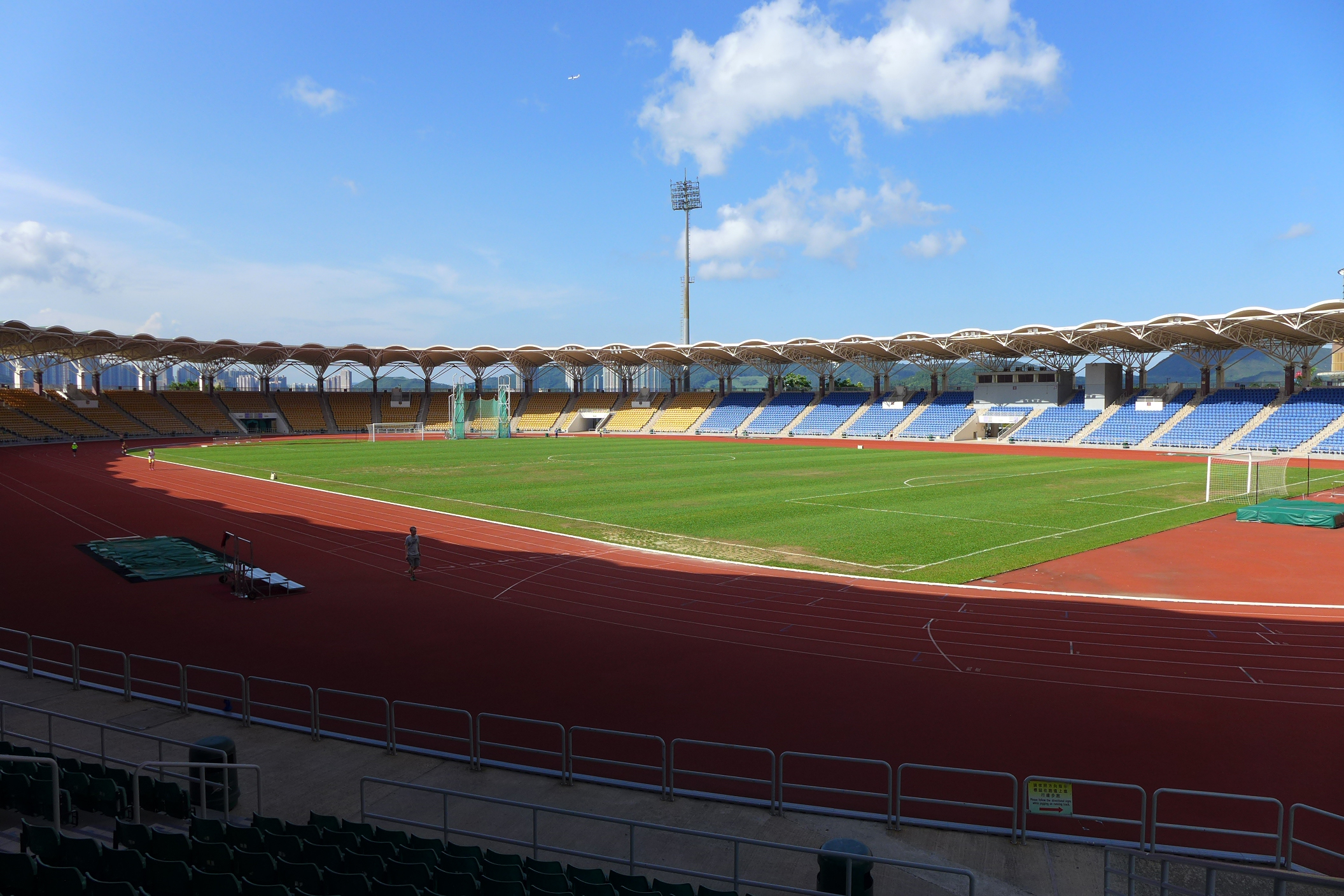
- Interactive map of Siu Sai Wan Sports Ground
- Address: 8 Fu Hong Street, Siu Sai Wan, Hong Kong
- Coordinates: 22.267473°N 114.249058°E
- Owner: Hong Kong Government
- Operator: Leisure and Cultural Services Department
- Capacity: 11,981
- Surface: Grass
- Pitch size: 105 x 67 metres (115 x 73 yards)
- Public transit: Chai Wan station

Construction
- Opened: December 1996; 29 years ago
- Cost: HK $230 million

Tenants
- Hong Kong Yokohama (2012–2013); Citizen (2009–2010); R&F (2016–2017); Eastern District (2025–)

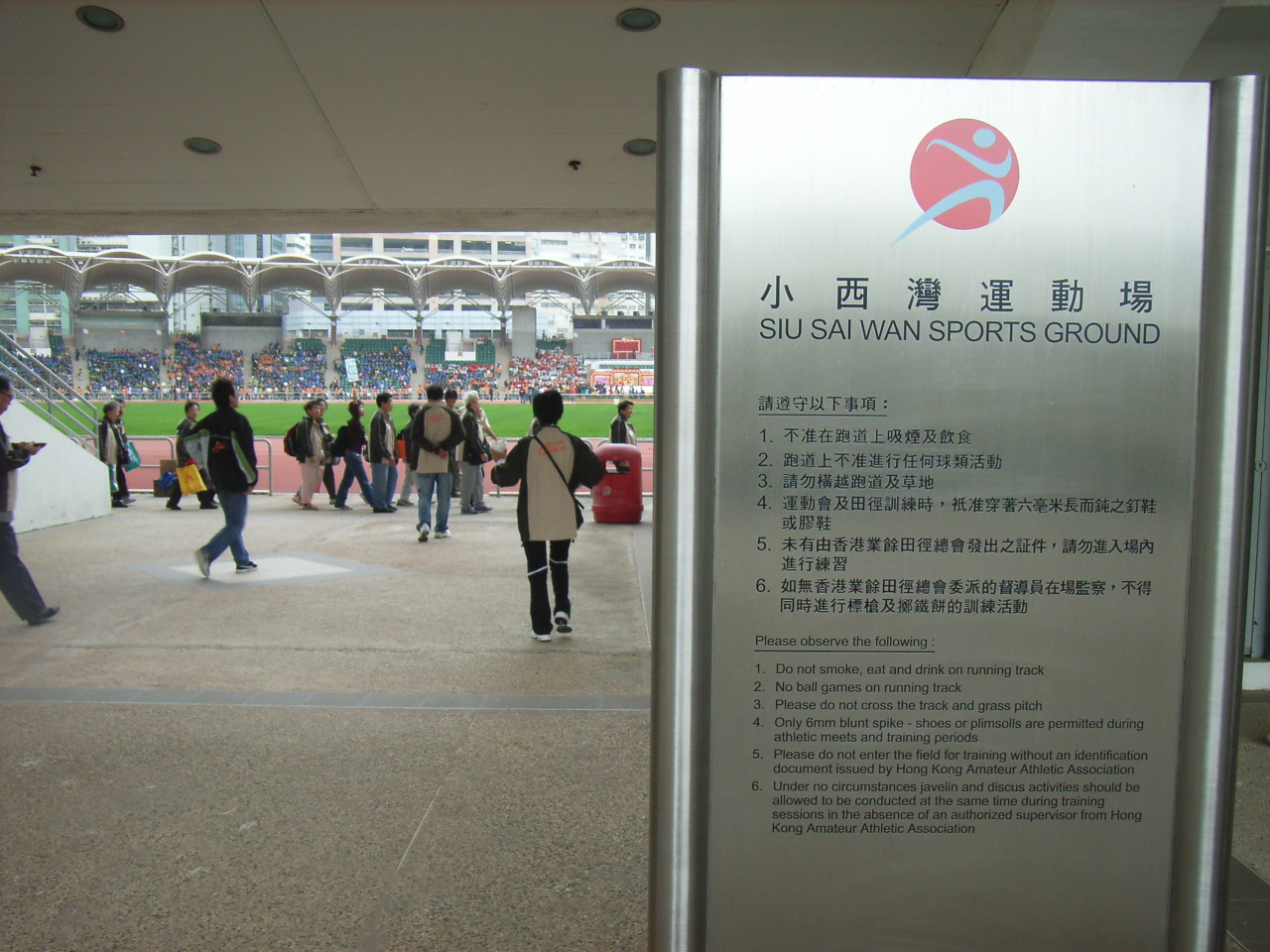
Ground rules sign in the stadium

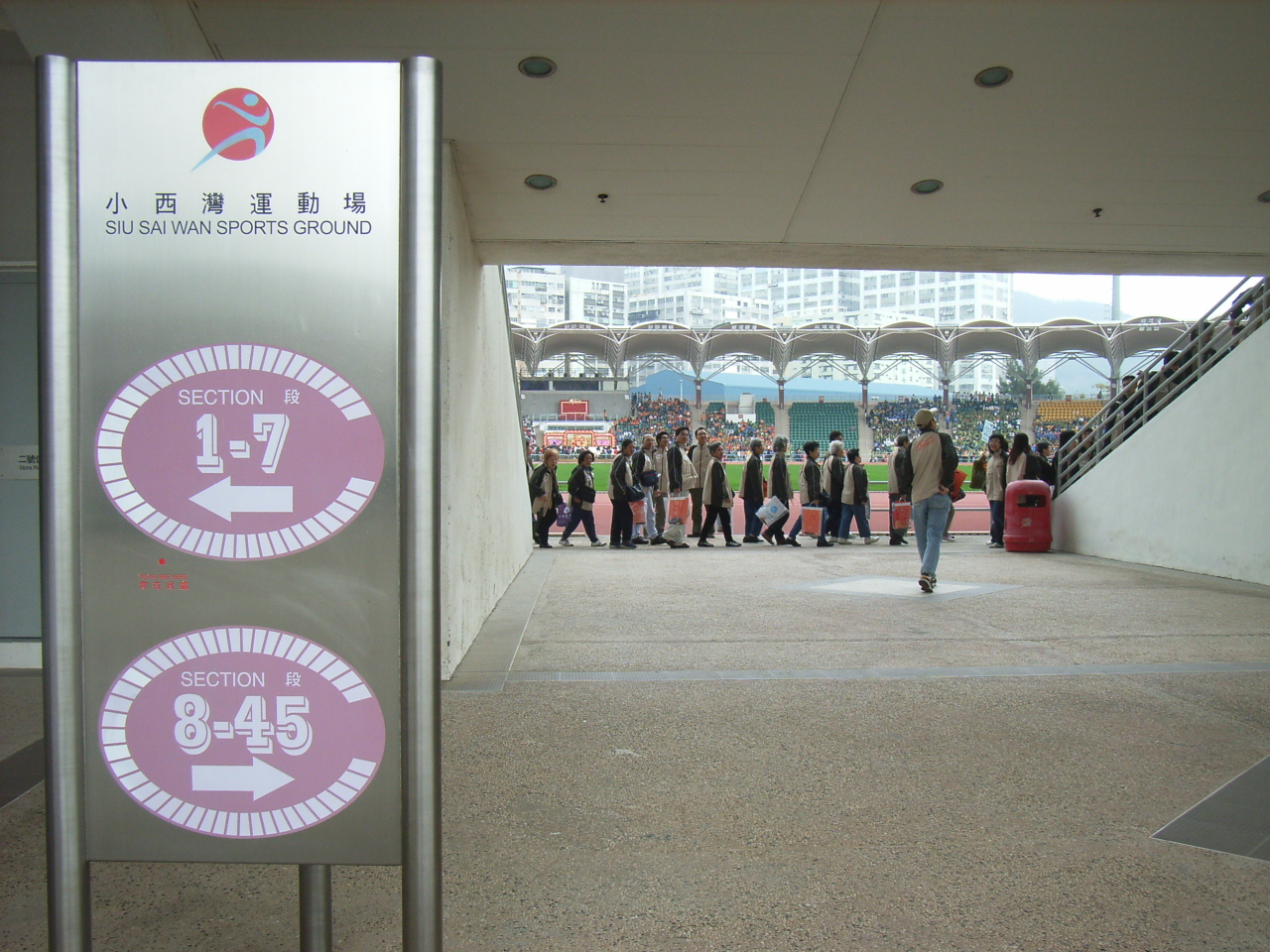
Section directions

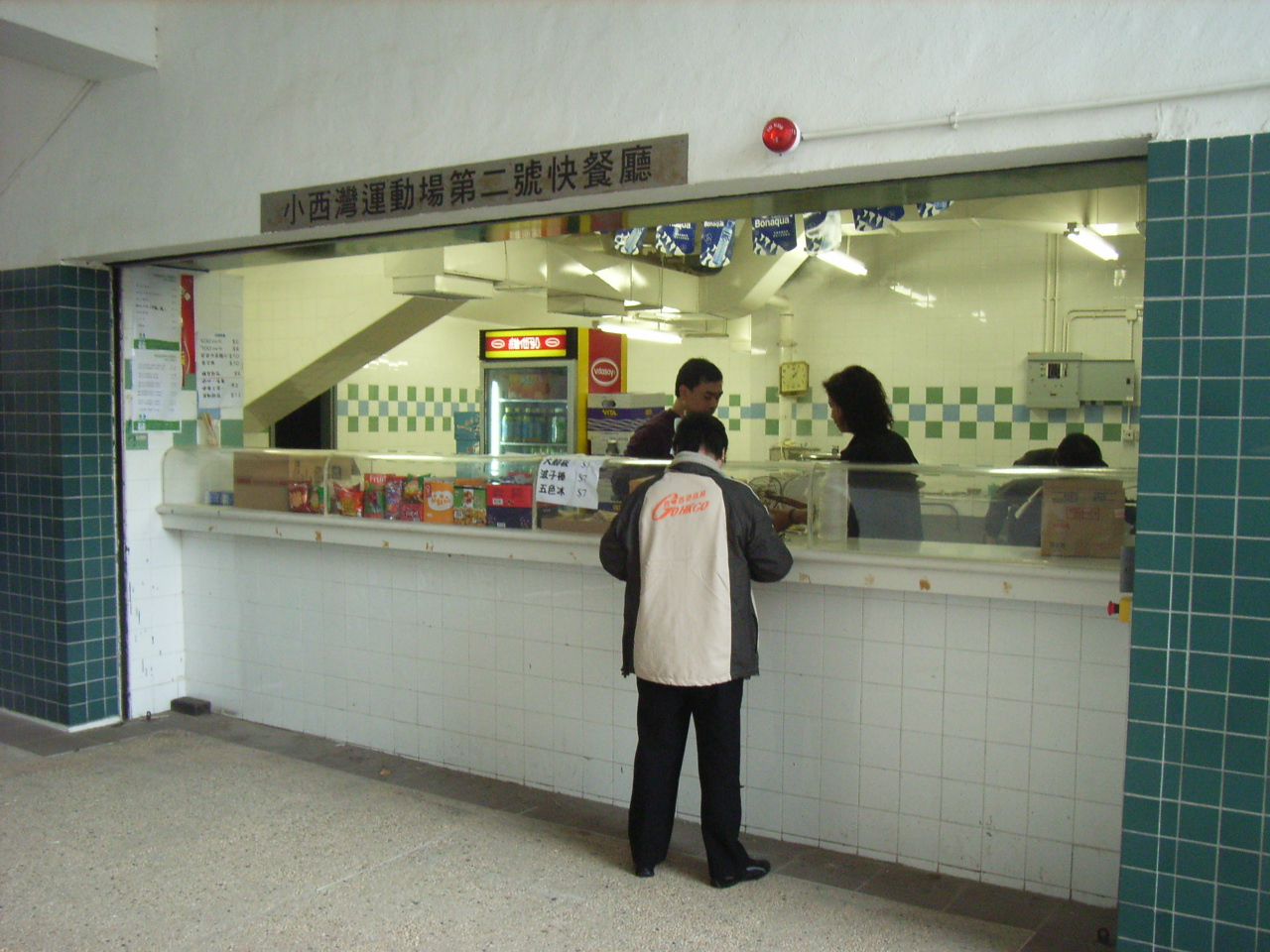
Fast food kiosk

Siu Sai Wan Sports Ground (Chinese: 小西灣運動場) is a multi-purpose stadium in Siu Sai Wan, Hong Kong. It is currently used mostly for football matches. It occupies about 43,000 square metres and its construction cost over HK $230 million. Opened in December 1996, the Sports Ground is a concrete structure built on a single level, with a permanent seating capacity of 11,981.

== Facilities ==
- Natural grass football field
- Athletic facilities conforming to the International Amateur Athletic Federation (IAAF) standard for track and field competitions.

== Ancillary facilities ==
- A weight training room for athletes
- Six air-conditioned changing and shower rooms (two for referees and four for teams)
- A function room and a VIP room
- Refreshment kiosks
- A fee-paying car park with 70 parking spaces (5 for coaches, 10 for motorcycles and 55 for private cars)

== Hong Kong First Division League ==
- Citizen AA used this sports ground as the home stadium in 2009–10 season.
- Hong Kong Yokohama used this sports ground as the home stadium in 2012–13 season.

== FIFA World Cup qualifiers ==
On 31 March 2004, with the Hong Kong Stadium being readied for the Hong Kong Rugby Sevens, Hong Kong played host to China PR in a 2006 FIFA World Cup qualification game at Siu Sai Wan Sports Ground instead. Hong Kong lost the game to China by 0:1. 9,000 fans attended the game.

On 8 September 2004, Hong Kong again used Siu Sai Wan Sports Ground as its home ground for the 2006 FIFA World Cup qualification game against Kuwait. Hong Kong lost by 0:2.

On 28 July 2011, Hong Kong hosted Saudi Arabia in the second round of the 2014 FIFA World Cup qualification. The Hong Kong Stadium is not available due to the hosting of the 2011 Barclays Asia Trophy from 27 to 31 July 2011.

== International football matches ==
=== China vs Melbourne Victory ===
On 4 July 2007, China played against Melbourne Victory at Siu Sai Wan Sports Ground in preparation for the 2007 AFC Asian Cup. The 90-minute game was separated into three 30-minute periods, and China won the game 1:0 with a goal from Wang Dong in the second period.

=== South China vs Chelsea FC ===
South China played against Chelsea from the English Premiership at the stadium on 20 May 1997. South China lost 2–3 to Chelsea. Gianluca Vialli scored two goals, and Roberto Di Matteo scored the other. South China's Shum Kwok Pui and Cheng Siu Chung scored for the home team. 10,500 fans attended the game.

== Location ==
This stadium is located close to the Island East Transfer Station and the Island Resort private housing estate. It is also located close to the Siu Sai Wan Promenade and Harmony Garden.
