= 2013–14 Kitchee SC season =

Kitchee
2013–14 season
- General Manager: Ken Ng
- Head Coach: (Spain) Àlex Gómez (Until 14 November 2013)
- Home Ground: Mong Kok Stadium (Capacity: 6,680)
- First Division: 1st
- Senior Shield: First round
- FA Cup: Runner-up
- 2013 AFC Cup: Quarter-final
- 2014 AFC Cup: Quarter-final
- Highest home attendance: 4,072
- Lowest home attendance: 630
- Average home league attendance: 1,769 (in all competitions)
Home colours	Away colours

The 2013–14 season is Kitchee's 35th season in the Hong Kong First Division League, the top flight of Hong Kong football, and their 83rd season in Hong Kong football. Kitchee will seek to reclaim the First Division League title after South China won it last season, as well as to defend their FA Cup champions. They will also compete in the Senior Challenge Shield this season.

As Kitchee have reached to the quarter-finals of the 2013 AFC Cup, they will also compete in the 2013 AFC Cup. On the other hand, they confirmed their qualification to the 2014 AFC Cup group stage as they defeated Tuen Mun 3–0 in the 2013 Hong Kong AFC Cup play-offs final.

== Key events ==
- 19 May 2013: Spanish forward Jonathan Carril completed a permanent transfer to Royal Southern after Carril spent almost the whole 2012–13 season on loan to Royal Southern.
- 29 May 2013: Spanish forward Yago González joins fellow First Division club Royal Southern for free.
- 29 May 2013: General manager Ken Ng confirmed that Spanish forward Jordi Tarrés has extended and signed a new 2-year contract with the club.
- 29 May 2013: Tsang Chi Hau and Matt Lam have also extended and signed a new 2-year and 1-year contract with the club respectively. On the other hand, Liu Quankun will also stay at the club.
- 30 May 2013: Hong Kong international midfielder Xu Deshuai joins the club from fellow First Division club Sun Pegasus for an undisclosed fee.
- 30 May 2013: Hong Kong midfielder To Hon To joins the club from newly relegated Second Division club Wofoo Tai Po for free.
- 31 May 2013: The club confirms that they will not extend Spanish striker Pablo Couñago's contract and he is free to join any club.
- 9 June 2013: Nigerian striker Alex Tayo Akande joins the club from newly relegated Second Division club Wofoo Tai Po for free.
- 9 June 2013: Ghanaian striker Christian Annan joins the club from newly relegated Second Division club Wofoo Tai Po for free.
- 13 June 2013: Canadian-born Hong Kong midfielder Landon Ling leaves the club and joins fellow First Division club Sun Pegasus for an undisclosed fee.
- 17 June 2013: English-born Hong Kong striker James Ha joins fellow First Division club Sunray Cave JC Sun Hei on a season-long loan.
- 17 June 2013: Hong Kong midfielder Ngan Lok Fung joins fellow First Division club Royal Southern on a season-long loan.
- 19 June 2013: Hong Kong striker Cheng Siu Wai leaves the club and joins newly promoted First Division club Eastern Salon for an undisclosed fee.
- 20 June 2013: Hong Kong forward Chan Ho Fung joins fellow First Division club Sunray Cave JC Sun Hei on a season-long loan.
- 20 June 2013: Hong Kong defender Li Ngai Hoi is expected to join fellow First Division club Sunray Cave JC Sun Hei on a season-long loan if his trial at Dalian Aerbin falls through.
- 23 June 2013: Hong Kong midfielder Lo Chi Kwan joins fellow First Division club Royal Southern on a season-long loan.
- 9 July 2013: Chinese-Hongkonger striker Liang Zicheng leaves the club and joins fellow First Division club Yokohama FC Hong Kong for an undisclosed fee.
- 9 July 2013: Spanish striker Juan Belencoso joins the club from Segunda División B club Cádiz CF for an undisclosed fee.
- 18 July 2013: Young English-Hong Kong midfielder Toby Philip Down leaves the club and joins fellow First Division club Citizen on a free transfer.
- 7 August 2013: Hong Kong defender Li Ngai Hoi joins fellow First Division club Royal Southern on loan until the end of the season.
- 12 November 2013: Pakistani defender Zesh Rehman leaves the club and joins Malaysia Super League club Pahang FA on a free transfer.
- 22 November 2013: Irish-Hong Kong midfielder Emmet Wan joins the club on a free transfer after a successful trial spell.
- 27 December 2013: Australian defender Jordan Elsey joins the club on loan from A-League club Adelaide United until the end of the season.
- 2 January 2014: Hong Kong striker James Ha is recalled from Sunray Cave JC Sun Hei by the club and has returned to the club.
- 6 January 2014: Australian defender Jordan Elsey is recalled by parent club Adelaide United and leaves the club.
- 6 January 2014: South Korean defender Jang Kyung-Jin joins the club from Korea National League club Ulsan Hyundai Mipo Dolphin FC on a free transfer.
- 17 January 2014: Hong Kong striker James Ha leaves the club and joins fellow First Division club Royal Southern on loan until the end of the season.
- 22 January 2014: Hong Kong defender Li Ngai Hoi has returned to the club from fellow First Division club Royal Southern and soon after he leaves the club and joins Chinese Super League club Changchun Yatai on an undisclosed fee.
- 26 January 2014: Spanish striker Diego Cascón joins the club from Segunda División club Real Jaén for an undisclosed fee.

== Players ==
=== Squad information ===
N	P	Nat.	Name	Date of birth	Age	Since	Previous club	Notes
1	GK	(Hong Kong)	Wang Zhenpeng^{LP}	5 May 1984	30	2005	(China) Dalian Shide	Second nationality: China
2	DF	(Spain)	Fernando Recio^{FP}	22 December 1982	30	2010	(Spain) Tortosa	
3	DF	(Spain)	Dani Cancela^{FP}	23 September 1981	32	2010	(Spain) Lugo	
6	MF	(Hong Kong)	Gao Wen^{LP}	18 January 1985	29	2006	(China) Shanghai Shenhua	Second nationality: China
7	MF	(Hong Kong)	Chu Siu Kei^{LP}	11 January 1980	34	2010	(Hong Kong) Shatin	Team captain
8	FW	(Nigeria)	Alex Tayo Akande^{FP}	9 February 1989	25	2013	(Hong Kong) Wofoo Tai Po	
9	FW	(Spain)	Juan Belencoso^{FP}	1 September 1981	32	2013	(Spain) Cádiz	
10	MF	(Hong Kong)	Lam Ka Wai^{LP}	5 June 1985	28	2008	(Hong Kong) Bulova Rangers	Team 2nd vice captain
11	MF	(Hong Kong)	To Hon To^{LP}	4 April 1989	25	2013	(Hong Kong) Wofoo Tai Po	
12	DF	(Hong Kong)	Lo Kwan Yee^{LP}	9 October 1984	29	2007	(Hong Kong) Rangers	Team 1st vice captain
13	DF	(Hong Kong)	Cheung Kin Fung^{LP}	1 January 1984	30	2013	(Hong Kong) Sunray Cave JC Sun Hei	
14	DF	(Hong Kong)	Liu Quankun^{LP}	17 February 1983	31	2003	(China) Dalian Shide	Second nationality: China
15	FW	(Ghana)	Christian Annan^{LP}	3 May 1978	36	2013	(Hong Kong) Wofoo Tai Po	Second nationality: Hong Kong
16	DF	(Hong Kong)	Tsang Chi Hau^{LP}	12 January 1990	24	2010	(Hong Kong) Happy Valley	
17	FW	(Hong Kong)	Chan Man Fai^{LP}	19 June 1988	25	2008	(Hong Kong) Workable	
18	FW	(Spain)	Jordi Tarrés^{FP}	16 March 1981	33	2010	(Spain) Hospitalet	
19	MF	(Hong Kong)	Huang Yang^{LP}	19 October 1983	30	201	Free Agent	Second nationality: China
20	MF	(Canada)	Matt Lam^{LP}	10 September 1989	24	2013 (Winter)	(Canada) FC Edmonton	Second nationality: Hong Kong
21	DF	(Hong Kong)	Tsang Kam To^{LP}	21 June 1989	24	2008	(Hong Kong) Workable	
22	MF	(Hong Kong)	Emmet Wan^{LP}	13 March 1993	21	2014 (Winter)	Free Agent	Second nationality: Republic of Ireland
23	GK	(China)	Guo Jianqiao^{LP}	20 July 1983	30	2011	(Hong Kong) Tai Chung	Second nationality: Hong Kong
27	GK	(Hong Kong)	Chan Ka Ho^{LP}	27 January 1996	18	2012	Youth system	
28	MF	(Hong Kong)	Xu Deshuai^{LP}	13 July 1987	26	2013	(Hong Kong) Sun Pegasus	Second nationality: China
30	DF	(Hong Kong)	Leung Robson Augusto Ka Hai^{LP}	22 April 1993	21	2008	Youth system	Second nationality: Brazil;
32	DF	(South Korea)	Jang Kyung-Jin^{AP}	31 August 1983	30	2014 (Winter)	(South Korea) Ulsan Hyundai Mipo	
33	FW	(Spain)	Diego Cascón^{FP}	7 June 1984	30	2014 (Winter)	(Spain) Jaén	
	MF	(Hong Kong)	Ngan Lok Fung	26 January 1993	21	2008	Youth system	On loan to Royal Southern
	MF	(Hong Kong)	Lo Chi Kwan	18 March 1981	33	2011	(Hong Kong) Fourway Rangers	On loan to Royal Southern
	FW	(Hong Kong)	James Stephen Gee Ha	26 December 1992	21	2011	Hong Kong FC	Second nationality: England; On loan to Royal Southern

Last update: 23 January 2014
Source: Kitchee
Ordered by squad number.
^{LP}Local player; ^{FP}Foreign player; ^{AP}Asian player.

=== 2013 AFC Cup Squad ===
Note: Flags indicate national team as defined under FIFA eligibility rules; some limited exceptions apply. Players may hold more than one non-FIFA nationality.

No.	Pos.	Nation	Player
1	GK	HKG	Wang Zhenpeng
2	DF	ESP	Fernando Recio^{FP}
5	DF	PAK	Zesh Rehman^{AP}
6	DF	HKG	Gao Wen
7	MF	HKG	Chu Siu Kei
10	MF	HKG	Lam Ka Wai
11	MF	HKG	To Hon To
12	DF	HKG	Lo Kwan Yee
13	FW	HKG	Chan Man Fai
14	DF	HKG	Liu Quankun
16	DF	HKG	Tsang Chi Hau

No.	Pos.	Nation	Player
17	GK	HKG	Chan Ka Ho
18	FW	ESP	Jordi Tarrés^{FP}
19	MF	HKG	Huang Yang
20	DF	HKG	Cheung Kin Fung
21	DF	HKG	Tsang Kam To
23	GK	CHN	Guo Jianqiao
28	MF	HKG	Xu Deshuai
30	MF	HKG	So Chun Yin
31	MF	HKG	Wong Tsz Chun
88	FW	NGA	Alex Tayo Akande^{FP}

Remarks:
^{FP} These players are registered as foreign players.
^{AP} These players are registered as AFC Asian players.

=== 2014 AFC Cup squad ===
Note: Flags indicate national team as defined under FIFA eligibility rules; some limited exceptions apply. Players may hold more than one non-FIFA nationality.

No.	Pos.	Nation	Player
1	GK	HKG	Wang Zhenpeng
2	DF	ESP	Fernando Recio^{FP}
6	DF	HKG	Gao Wen
7	MF	HKG	Chu Siu Kei
9	FW	ESP	Juan Belencoso^{FP}
10	MF	HKG	Lam Ka Wai
11	MF	HKG	To Hon To
12	DF	HKG	Lo Kwan Yee
13	DF	HKG	Cheung Kin Fung
14	DF	HKG	Liu Quankun
16	DF	HKG	Tsang Chi Hau

No.	Pos.	Nation	Player
17	FW	HKG	Chan Man Fai
18	FW	ESP	Jordi Tarrés^{FP}
19	MF	HKG	Huang Yang
21	DF	HKG	Tsang Kam To
22	MF	HKG	Emmet Wan
23	GK	CHN	Guo Jianqiao
27	GK	HKG	Chan Ka Ho
28	MF	HKG	Xu Deshuai
30	DF	HKG	Leung Ka Hai
32	DF	KOR	Jang Kyung-Jin^{AP}

Remarks:
^{FP} These players are registered as foreign players.
^{AP} These players are registered as AFC Asian players.

=== Transfers ===
==== In ====
#	Position	Player	Transferred from	Fee	Date	Team	Source
28	MF	(Hong Kong) Xu Deshuai	(Hong Kong) Sun Pegasus	Undisclosed	30 May 2013	First team	
11	MF	(Hong Kong) To Hon To	(Hong Kong) Wofoo Tai Po	Free transfer	30 May 2013	First team	
8	FW	(Nigeria) Alex Tayo Akande	(Hong Kong) Wofoo Tai Po	Free transfer	9 June 2013	First team	
15	FW	(Ghana) Christian Annan	(Hong Kong) Wofoo Tai Po	Free transfer	9 June 2013	First team	
13	DF	(Hong Kong) Cheung Kin Fung	(Hong Kong) Sunray Cave JC Sun Hei	Undisclosed	1 July 2013	First team	
9	FW	(Spain) Juan Belencoso	(Spain) Cádiz	Undisclosed	9 July 2013	First team	
22	MF	(Hong Kong) Emmet Wan	Free Agent	Free transfer	22 November 2013	First team	
32	DF	(South Korea) Jang Kyung-Jin	(South Korea) Ulsan Hyundai Mipo	Free transfer	6 January 2014	First team	
33	FW	(Spain) Diego Cascón	(Spain) Jaén	Undisclosed	26 January 2014	First team	

==== Out ====
#	Position	Player	Transferred to	Fee	Date	Team	Source
	FW	(Spain) Jonathan Carril	(Hong Kong) Royal Southern	Free transfer (End of contract)	19 May 2013	First team	
11	FW	(Spain) Yago González	(Hong Kong) Royal Southern	Free transfer (End of contract)	29 May 2013	First team	
8	FW	(Spain) Pablo Couñago	Unattached	Free transfer (End of contract)	31 May 2013	First team	
28	FW	(Hong Kong) Cheng Siu Wai	(Hong Kong) Eastern Salon	Undisclosed	20 June 2013	First team	
24	MF	(Canada) Landon Lloyd Ling	(Hong Kong) Sun Pegasus	Undisclosed	13 June 2013	First team	
9	FW	(China) Liang Zicheng	Yokohama FC Hong Kong	Undisclosed	9 July 2013	First team	
	MF	(England) Toby Down	(Hong Kong) Citizen	Free transfer	18 July 2013	Youth team	
5	DF	(Pakistan) Zesh Rehman	(Malaysia) Pahang FA	Free transfer	12 November 2013	First team	
	DF	(Hong Kong) Li Ngai Hoi	(China) Changchun Yatai	Undisclosed	22 January 2014	First team	

==== Loan In ====
#	Position	Player	Loaned from	Date	Loan expires	Team	Source
	DF	(Australia) Jordan Elsey	(Australia) Adelaide United	27 December 2013	6 January 2014	First team	

==== Loan out ====
#	Position	Player	Loaned to	Date	Loan expires	Team	Source
4	DF	(Hong Kong) Lui Man Tik	(Hong Kong) Sunray Cave JC Sun Hei	17 June 2013	End of the season	First team	
	FW	(Hong Kong) James Ha	(Hong Kong) Sunray Cave JC Sun Hei	17 June 2013	2 January 2014	First team	
25	MF	(Hong Kong) Ngan Lok Fung	(Hong Kong) Royal Southern	17 June 2013	End of the season	First team	
	FW	(Hong Kong) Chan Ho Fung	(Hong Kong) Sunray Cave JC Sun Hei	20 June 2013	End of the season	Reserves	
22	MF	(Hong Kong) Lo Chi Kwan	(Hong Kong) Royal Southern	23 June 2013	End of the season	First team	
	DF	(Hong Kong) Li Ngai Hoi	(Hong Kong) Royal Southern	7 August 2013	22 January 2014	First team	
	FW	(Hong Kong) James Ha	(Hong Kong) Royal Southern	17 January 2014	End of the season	First team	

== Club ==
=== Coaching staff ===
Position	Staff
Head Coach	(Spain) Àlex Gómez
Assistant Coach	(Spain) Yago Aguilar
Assistant Coach	(Hong Kong) Cheng Siu Chung
Assistant Coach	(Spain) Roberto Losada

Last updated: 2 July 2013
Source: Kitchee

== Statistics ==
Note: Voided matches are not counted in the statistics except discipline records.

=== Overall Stats ===
	League	Shield	FA Cup	2013 AFC Cup	2014 AFC Cup	Total Stats
Games played	16	1	2	2	5	26
Games won	13	0	1	0	4	18
Games drawn	3	0	1	0	1	5
Games lost	0	1	0	2	0	3
Goals for	40	1	5	2	15	63
Goals against	10	2	0	4	3	19
Players used	24	14	15	13	18	24^{1}
Yellow cards	29	3	4	4	7	48
Red cards	0	0	0	0	0	0

Last updated: 17 April 2014
Source: Player Stats

Players Used: Kitchee have used a total of 24 different players in all competitions.

=== Appearances ===
				Total				League		Shield		FA Cup		2013 AFC Cup		2014 AFC Cup	
N	P	Nat.	Name	GS	App	Goals	Min	App	Goals	App	Goals	App	Goals	App	Goals	App	Goals
1	GK	(Hong Kong)	Wang Zhenpeng	18	19	–15	1668	13	–8	1	–2	0	–0	2	–4	4	–3
23	GK	(China)	Guo Jianqiao	7	7	–2	612	4	–2	0	–0	2	–0	0	–0	1	–0
27	GK	(Hong Kong)	Chan Ka Ho	0	0	–0	0	0	–0	0	–0	0	–0	0	–0	0	–0
2	DF	(Spain)	Recio	25	25	3	2078	15	2	1	0	2	0	2	0	5	1
3	DF	(Spain)	Dani	15	17	2	1443	15	2	1	0	1	0	0	0	0	0
12	DF	(Hong Kong)	Lo Kwan Yee	18	21	0	1657	13	0	1	0	2	0	2	0	3	0
13	DF	(Hong Kong)	Cheung Kin Fung	11	14	1	950	5	0	1	0	1	1	2	0	5	0
14	DF	(Hong Kong)	Liu Quankun	4	7	0	398	3	0	0	0	0	0	2	0	2	0
16	DF	(Hong Kong)	Tsang Chi Hau	7	10	0	630	4	0	0	0	1	0	2	0	3	0
21	DF	(Hong Kong)	Tsang Kam To	9	13	0	797	5	0	1	0	0	0	2	0	5	0
30	DF	(Hong Kong)	Leung Ka Hai	0	1	22	0	0	0	0	1	0	0	0	0	0	0
32	DF	(South Korea)	Jang Kyung-Jin	12	14	0	1153	9	0	0	0	1	0	0	0	4	0
	DF	(Pakistan)	Zesh Rehman	7	8	0	645	5	0	1	0	0	0	2	0	0	0
6	MF	(Hong Kong)	Gao Wen	8	17	0	771	9	0	0	0	1	0	2	0	5	0
7	MF	(Hong Kong)	Chu Siu Kei	0	2	0	33	2	0	0	0	0	0	0	0	0	0
10	MF	(Hong Kong)	Lam Ka Wai	19	22	3	1557	14	3	1	0	1	0	2	0	4	0
11	MF	(Hong Kong)	To Hon To	1	5	0	125	1	0	0	0	1	0	0	0	3	0
19	MF	(Hong Kong)	Huang Yang	24	25	0	2209	16	0	1	0	1	0	2	0	5	0
20	MF	(Canada)	Matt Lam	19	19	1	1697	16	1	1	0	2	0	0	0	0	0
22	MF	(Hong Kong)	Emmet Wan	2	3	202	1	0	0	0	1	0	0	0	0	1	0
28	MF	(Hong Kong)	Xu Deshuai	3	11	0	426	5	0	0	0	1	0	0	0	5	1
8	FW	(Nigeria)	Alex	11	18	8	1150	13	5	1	0	2	2	2	1	0	0
9	FW	(Spain)	Belencoso	18	20	19	1584	15	11	0	0	0	0	0	0	5	8
15	FW	(Ghana)	Annan	11	17	3	1063	14	3	1	0	2	0	0	0	0	0
17	FW	(Hong Kong)	Chan Man Fai	9	16	3	774	8	0	1	0	1	1	1	0	5	2
18	FW	(Spain)	Jordi	19	22	11	1706	13	7	1	1	2	0	2	1	4	3
33	FW	(Spain)	Diego Cascón	8	9	3	752	7	3	0	0	2	0	0	0	0	0

Last updated: 17 April 2014

=== Top scorers ===
R	Pos	Nat.	No.	Name	League	Shield	FA Cup	2013 AFC Cup	2014 AFC Cup	Total
1	FW	(Spain)	9	Juan Belencoso	11	0	0	0	8	19
2	FW	(Spain)	18	Jordi Tarrés	7	1	0	1	3	12
3	FW	(Nigeria)	8	Alex Tayo Akande	5	0	2	1	0	8
4	Own goal				3	0	1	0	0	4
5	DF	(Spain)	2	Fernando Recio	2	0	0	0	1	3
5	MF	(Hong Kong)	10	Lam Ka Wai	3	0	0	0	0	3
5	FW	(Ghana)	15	Christian Annan	3	0	0	0	0	3
5	FW	(Hong Kong)	17	Chan Man Fai	0	0	1	0	2	3
5	FW	(Spain)	33	Diego Cascón	3	0	0	0	0	3
10	DF	(Spain)	3	Dani Cancela	2	0	0	0	0	2
11	DF	(Hong Kong)	13	Cheung Kin Fung	0	0	1	0	0	1
11	MF	(Canada)	20	Matt Lam	1	0	0	0	0	1
11	MF	(Hong Kong)	28	Xu Deshuai	0	0	0	0	1	1
TOTALS					40	1	5	2	15	63

Last updated: 17 April 2014

=== Disciplinary record ===
N	P	Nat.	Name	League			Shield			FA Cup			2013 AFC Cup			2014 AFC Cup			Total			Notes
N	P	Nat.	Name	Yellow card	Second yellow card	Red card	Yellow card	Second yellow card	Red card	Yellow card	Second yellow card	Red card	Yellow card	Second yellow card	Red card	Yellow card	Second yellow card	Red card	Yellow card	Second yellow card	Red card	Notes
1	GK	(Hong Kong)	Wang Zhenpeng	1												1			2			
2	DF	(Spain)	Recio	3						1			1						5			
3	DF	(Spain)	Dani Cancela	4			1												5			
6	MF	(Hong Kong) (China)	Gao Wen	1												1			2			
8	FW	(Nigeria)	Alex	3															3			
9	FW	(Spain)	Belencoso							1									1			
10	MF	(Hong Kong)	Lam Ka Wai				1									1			2			
12	DF	(Hong Kong)	Lo Kwan Yee	1															1			
13	DF	(Hong Kong)	Cheung Kin Fung	1												1			2			
14	DF	(Hong Kong)	Liu Quankun																			
15	FW	(Ghana)	Annan																			
16	DF	(Hong Kong)	Tsang Chi Hau										1			1			2			
17	FW	(Hong Kong)	Chan Man Fai	1															1			
18	FW	(Spain)	Jordi	2															2			
19	MF	(Hong Kong) (China)	Huang Yang	1									1			1			3			
20	MF	(Canada) (Hong Kong)	Matt Lam	4												1			5			
21	DF	(Hong Kong)	Tsang Kam To	1									1						2			
20	MF	(Hong Kong) (Republic of Ireland)	Emmet Wan	1															1			
23	GK	(Hong Kong) (China)	Guo Jianqiao																			
28	MF	(Hong Kong) (China)	Xu Deshuai	1						1									2			
32	DF	(South Korea)	Jang Kyung-Jin	2															2			
33	FW	(Spain)	Cascón	1						1									2			
	DF	(Pakistan)	Zesh Rehman				1												1			

Last updated: 17 April 2014
Source: Competitive matches
Only competitive matches
Ordered by (red card) , (second yellow card) and (yellow card)
(yellow card) = Number of bookings; (second yellow card) = Number of sending offs after a second yellow card; (red card) = Number of sending offs by a direct red card.

=== Substitution Record ===
Includes all competitive matches.

			League		Shield		FA Cup		2013 AFC Cup		2014 AFC Cup		Total	
No.	Pos	Name	subson	subsoff	subson	subsoff	subson	subsoff	subson	subsoff	subson	subsoff	subson	subsoff
Goalkeepers
1	GK	Wang Zhenpeng	1	0	0	0	0	0	0	0	0	0	1	0
23	GK	Guo Jianqiao	0	1	0	0	0	0	0	0	0	0	0	1
27	GK	Chan Ka Ho	0	0	0	0	0	0	0	0	0	0	0	0
Defenders
2	CB	Recio	0	2	0	0	0	1	0	1	0	1	0	5
3	LB	Dani	1	0	1	0	0	0	0	0	0	0	2	0
5	CB	Rehman	1	0	0	0	0	0	0	0	0	0	1	0
12	RB	Lo Kwan Yee	1	1	1	0	0	1	0	1	1	1	3	4
13	LB	Cheung Kin Fung	3	1	0	1	0	0	0	0	0	0	3	2
14	CB	Liu Quankun	0	1	0	0	0	0	1	0	2	0	3	1
16	CB	Tsang Chi Hau	1	0	0	0	0	0	1	1	1	1	3	2
21	RB	Tsang Kam To	1	2	0	1	0	0	1	0	2	1	4	4
30	LB	Leung Ka Hai	0	0	0	0	1	0	0	0	0	0	1	0
32	CB	Jang Kyung-Jin	1	0	0	0	0	0	0	0	0	0	1	0
Midfielders
6	DM	Gao Wen	8	2	0	0	1	0	1	1	0	3	10	6
7	CM	Chu Siu Kei	2	0	0	0	0	0	0	0	0	0	2	0
10	CM	Lam Ka Wai	2	9	0	1	0	1	1	0	0	3	3	14
11	AM	To Hon To	1	0	0	0	0	0	0	0	3	0	4	0
19	DM	Huang Yang	0	2	0	0	0	0	0	0	1	1	1	3
20	CM	Matt Lam	0	2	0	0	0	0	0	0	0	0	0	2
22	DM	Emmet Wan	0	0	0	0	0	1	0	0	1	0	1	1
28	RM	Xu Deshuai	4	2	0	0	0	1	0	0	4	0	8	3
Forwards
8	CF	Alex	6	4	0	0	1	0	0	0	0	0	7	4
9	CF	Juan Belencoso	1	3	0	0	0	0	0	0	0	0	1	3
15	LW	Annan	3	4	1	0	2	0	0	0	0	0	6	4
17	SS	Chan Man Fai	6	2	0	0	1	0	0	1	0	4	7	7
18	CF	Jordi	4	8	0	0	0	1	0	0	0	0	4	9
33	CF	Diego Cascón	1	2	0	0	0	0	0	0	0	0	1	2

Last updated: 17 April 2014

=== Captains ===
No.	P	Name	Country	No. games	Notes
12	MF	Lo Kwan Yee	(Hong Kong)	18	1st vice-captain
10	MF	Lam Ka Wai	(Hong Kong)	5	2nd vice-captain
19	MF	Huang Yang	(Hong Kong)	3	3rd vice-captain

Last updated: 17 April 2014
Source: Competitive match reports.
Competitive matches only
Matches started as captain only
Country: FIFA nationality; No.: Squad number; P: Position; Name: Player name; No. Games: Number of games started as captain.

== Competitions ==
=== Overall ===
Competition	Started round	Current position / round	Final position / round	First match	Last match
Hong Kong First Division League	—	1st		30 August 2013	10–11 May 2014
Senior Challenge Shield	TBA	—		November 2013	
FA Cup	TBA	—		January 2014	
2013 AFC Cup	Quarter-finals	—	Quarter-finals	17 September 2013	24 September 2013
AFC Cup	Group stage	—		February 2014	

Updated to match played 27 August 2013
Source: Competitions

=== First Division League ===
==== Classification ====
Pos	Team	Pld	W	D	L	GF	GA	GD	Pts	Qualification or relegation
1	Kitchee (C)	18	15	3	0	47	12	+35	48	2015 AFC Champions League play-off stage
2	Sun Pegasus	18	10	2	6	40	28	+12	32	2013–14 Hong Kong season play-off
3	South China	18	8	8	2	35	24	+11	32	2015 AFC Cup (Note: South China won the 2013–14 Hong Kong season play-off and thus qualified for the 2015 AFC Cup group stage.)
4	Royal Southern (R)	18	5	6	7	25	32	−7	21	2013–14 Hong Kong season play-off and relegation to 2014–15 Hong Kong First Division League (Note: Since the 2013–14 Hong Kong Senior Challenge Shield winners (South China) would at this point qualify for the 2013–14 Hong Kong season play-off, the 4th placed team would qualify for the Season Play-off. At the same time, Royal Southern declined to participate in the 2014–15 Hong Kong Premier League and would self-relegate in the following season.)
5	Hong Kong Rangers	18	5	6	7	23	32	−9	21	

Updated to match(es) played on 11 May 2014. Source: Hong Kong Football Association
Rules for classification: 1) points; 2) head-to-head points; 3) head-to-head goal difference; 4) head-to-head goals scored; 5) goal difference; 6) number of goals scored.
(C) Champions; (R) Relegated

==== Results summary ====
Overall								Home						Away					
Pld	W	D	L	GF	GA	GD	Pts	W	D	L	GF	GA	GD	W	D	L	GF	GA	GD
16	13	3	0	40	10	+30	42	6	1	0	24	6	+18	7	2	0	16	4	+12

Last updated: 17 April 2014.
Source: First Division

==== Results by round ====
Round	1	2	3	4	6	7	10	8	9	5	11	12	13	14	15	16	17	18	19	20	21	22
Ground	H	H	A	H	A	A	A	A	A	H	H	A	H	A	A	A	H	H	A	H	H	H
Result	W	W	D	W	W	W	W	V	V	W	W	W	W	D	W	W	V	V	W	D		
Position (Note: Kitchee's position at the end of the day in which their match was played)	1	1	1	1	1	1	1	1	1	1	1	1	1	1	1	1	1	1	1	1	1	1

Updated to match(es) played on 17 April 2014. Source: Competitive Matches
A = Away; H = Home; W = Win; D = Draw; L = Loss; V = Voided

== Matches ==
Win Draw Loss Void

=== Pre-season friendlies ===
17 July 2013 Shanghai Tour	Shanghai U-20 (China)	2 – 1	(Hong Kong) Kitchee	Shanghai, China PR
	Goal		53' Xu Deshuai

19 July 2013 Shanghai Tour	Shanghai U-20 (China)	2 – 1	(Hong Kong) Kitchee	Shanghai, China PR

21 July 2013 Shanghai Tour	Shanghai SIPG (China)	0 – 1	(Hong Kong) Kitchee	Shanghai, China PR
			66' Alex

24 July 2013	Kitchee (China)	4 – 0	Hong Kong U23	Hong Kong
	Goal

29 July 2013 MUFC Asia Tour	Kitchee (Hong Kong)	2 – 5	(England) Manchester United	So Kon Po, Hong Kong
20:00 (GMT+8)	Lam Ka Wai 51'; Alex 68'		Welbeck 16'; Smalling 19'; Fabio 22'; Januzaj 49'; Lingard 80'	Stadium: Hong Kong Stadium (Capacity: 40,000); Attendance: 39,102; Referee: Ng Chiu Kok (Hong Kong); Assistant referees: Chan Shui Hung (Hong Kong), Chung Ming Sun (Hong Kong); Fourth official: Liu Kwok Man (Hong Kong)

7 August 2013	Hong Kong	1 – 2	(Hong Kong) Kitchee	Lam Tin, Kowloon
	Lam Ka Wai (pen.)		Alex; Belencoso	Stadium: Sai Tso Wan Recreation Ground

15 August 2013 Thailand Tour	Chonburi (Thailand)	4 – 4	(Hong Kong) Kitchee	Thailand
	Goal		Belencoso; Jordi

16 August 2013 Thailand Tour	J.W. Rangsit (Thailand)	v	(Hong Kong) Kitchee	Thailand

19 August 2013 Thailand Tour	BEC Tero Sasana (Thailand)	v	(Hong Kong) Kitchee	Thailand

=== First Division League ===
31 August 2013 Round 1	Kitchee	Postponed	Sunray Cave JC Sun Hei	Mong Kok, Kowloon
17:30 UTC+8				Stadium: Mong Kok Stadium (Capacity: 6,680)

3 September 2013 Round 1R	Kitchee	6 – 2	Sunray Cave JC Sun Hei	Mong Kok, Kowloon
20:00 UTC+8	Reinaldo 22' (o.g.); Belencoso 30', 45'; Alex (yellow card) 71'; Jordi 82', 88'; Su Yang 90+2' (o.g.)	Report	(yellow card) 9' Yuen Tsun Nam; 44' (yellow card) 45+1' Lugo; 46' Bouet; (yellow card) 72' Reinaldo; (yellow card) 74' Cheung Kwok Ming	Stadium: Mong Kok Stadium (Capacity: 6,680); Attendance: 1,214; Referee: Liu Kwok Man; Assistant referees: Lui Siu Chuen, Lam Nai Kei; Fourth official: Luk Kin Sun

13 September 2013 Round 2	Kitchee	3 – 0	Eastern Salon	Mong Kok, Kowloon
14:30 UTC+8	Beto 43' (o.g.); Jordi (yellow card) 28' (goal) 57' (pen.); Dani (yellow card) 70'; Beloncoso 90'	Report	(yellow card) 43' Man Pei Tak; (yellow card) 90+3' Cheng Siu Wai	Stadium: Mong Kok Stadium (Capacity: 6,680); Attendance: 2,214; Referee: Tong Kui Sum; Assistant referees: Lam Nai Kei, Lau Fong Hei; Fourth official: Lam Chi Ho

21 September 2013 Round 3	South China	0 − 0	Kitchee	So Kon Po, Hong Kong Island
17:30 UTC+8	Joel (yellow card) 1'	Report	(yellow card) 35' Recio; (yellow card) 79' Dani	Stadium: Hong Kong Stadium (Capacity: 40,000); Attendance: 3,493; Referee: Tong Kui Sum; Assistant referees: Chow Chun Kit, Lam Nai Kei; Fourth official: Yu Chun Sun

29 September 2013 Round 4	Kitchee	3 − 1	Citizen	Mong Kok, Kowloon
14:30 UTC+8	Alex 15', 75'; Lam Ka Wai 45+4'	Report	(yellow card) 24' Chan Hin Kwong; (yellow card) 29' Sham Kwok Keung; (yellow card) 78' So Loi Keung; 85' Nakamura	Stadium: Mong Kok Stadium (Capacity: 6,680); Attendance: 1,250; Referee: Cheng Oi Cho; Assistant referees: Lui Siu Chuen, Yau Ho Fai; Fourth official: Fok Pong Shing

6 October 2013 Round 5	Kitchee	Postponed	Biu Chun Rangers	Mong Kok, Kowloon
14:30 UTC+8				Stadium: Mong Kok Stadium (Capacity: 6,680)

19 October 2013 Round 6	Yokohama FC Hong Kong	0 – 1	Kitchee	Tseung Kwan O, New Territories
17:30 UTC+8		Report	(yellow card) 9' Recio; (yellow card) 52' Chan Man Fai; 65' Annan; (yellow card) 84' Alex	Stadium: Tseung Kwan O Sports Ground (Capacity: 3,500); Attendance: 605; Referee: Luk Kin Sun; Assistant referees: Chow Chun Kit, Lam Nai Kei; Fourth official: Lau Fong Hei

3 November 2013 Round 7	Royal Southern	0 – 1	Kitchee	Aberdeen, Hong Kong Island
14:30 UTC+8	Ip Chung Long (yellow card) 50'	Report	5' Jordi	Stadium: Aberdeen Sports Ground (Capacity: 4,000); Attendance: 586; Referee: Lau Fong Hei; Assistant referees: Yu Chun Sun, Fok Pong Shing; Fourth official: Ng Kai Lam

23 November 2013 Round 10	I-Sky Yuen Long	0 – 2	Kitchee	Yuen Long, New Territories
17:30 UTC+8	Hui Wang Fung (yellow card) 21'; Marques (yellow card) 43'; Souza (yellow card) 68'	Report	(yellow card) 11' Jordi; (yellow card) 15' Matt Lam; (yellow card) 60' Wang Zhenpeng; 79', 85' Belencoso	Stadium: Yuen Long Stadium (Capacity: 4,932); Attendance: 1,325; Referee: Ng Chiu Kok; Assistant referees: Yu Chun Sun, Lam Chi Ho; Fourth official: Lo Yuk Ming

30 November 2013 Round 8	Tuen Mun	0 – 5 (Voided)	Kitchee	Tuen Mun, New Territories
14:30 UTC+8	Garvic (yellow card) 21'; Yin Guangjun (yellow card) 44'; Feng Tao (yellow card) 53'	Report	17' Annan; 21' (pen.), 45+1', 87' Belencoso; 25' Matt Lam; (yellow card) 44' Alex	Stadium: Tuen Mun Tang Shiu Kin Sports Ground (Capacity: 2,200); Attendance: 599; Referee: Ho Wai Sing; Assistant referees: Yau Ho Fai, Sarao Amarjit Singh; Fourth official: Luk Kin Sun

21 December 2013 Round 9	Happy Valley	1 – 5 (Voided)	Kitchee	Tai Po, New Territories
14:30 UTC+8	Akosah (yellow card) 37' (goal) 68'; Chao Pengfei (yellow card) 58'; Arce (yellow card) 63' (red card) 87'; Yeung Chi Lun (yellow card) 90'; Lau Ka Ching (yellow card) 90'; Mus (yellow card) 90'	Report	24', 44' Belencoso; 45+4' Alex; 66' Dani; 90+1' Jordi	Stadium: Tai Po Sports Ground (Capacity: 3,000); Attendance: 415; Referee: Ng Chiu Kok; Assistant referees: Chow Chun Kit, Yu Kin Fung; Fourth official: Lee Chung Yin

11 January 2014 Round 5P	Kitchee	4 – 1	Biu Chun Rangers	Mong Kok, Kowloon
17:30 UTC+8	Recio 15'; Jordi 33'; Gao Wen (yellow card) 80'; Belencoso 81', 90+3'	Report	4' Lam Hok Hei	Stadium: Mong Kok Stadium (Capacity: 6,680); Attendance: 1,020; Referee: Tong Kui Sum; Assistant referees: Lau Fong Hei, Sarao Amarjit Singh; Fourth official: Yau Tsz Yeung

19 January 2014 Round 11	Kitchee	3 – 1	Sun Pegasus	Mong Kok, Kowloon
14:30 UTC+8	Annan 14'; Huang Yang (yellow card) 33'; Recio (yellow card) 65'; Belencoso 80', 83'; Jang Kyung-Jin (yellow card) 88'	Report	(yellow card) 23' Deng Jinghuang; 89' (pen.) Raščić; (yellow card) 90+1' Tong Kin Man; (yellow card) 90+3' Mbome	Stadium: Mong Kok Stadium (Capacity: 6,680); Attendance: 2,742; Referee: Ho Wai Sing; Assistant referees: Luk Kin Sun, Yau Ho Fai; Fourth official: Lau Fong Hei

8 February 2014 Round 12	Sun Pegasus	1 – 2	Kitchee	Mong Kok, Kowloon
14:30 UTC+8	Raščić 5'; Wong Yim Kwan (yellow card) 53'; Deng Jinghuang (yellow card) 82'	Report	21' Recio; 72' Belencoso	Stadium: Mong Kok Stadium (Capacity: 6,680); Attendance: 2,101; Referee: Ng Chiu Kok; Assistant referees: Chow Chun Kit, Lam Nai Kei; Fourth official: Chan Ming Siu

15 February 2014 Round 13	Kitchee	4 – 0	Royal Southern	Mong Kok, Kowloon
14:30 UTC+8	Alex 2'; Lam Ka Wai 19'; Dani 36'; Jordi 69'; Xu Deshuai (yellow card) 84'	Report	(yellow card) 13' Carril; (yellow card) 53' Che Runqiu; (yellow card) 64' Dieguito	Stadium: Mong Kok Stadium (Capacity: 6,680); Attendance: 869; Referee: Liu Kwok Man; Assistant referees: Lui Siu Chuen, Sarao Armanjit Singh; Fourth official: Ng Wai Hong

22 February 2014 Round 14	Eastern Salon	2 – 2	Kitchee	Mong Kok, Kowloon
14:30 UTC+8	Liang Zicheng (yellow card) 30' (goal) 66'; Li Haiqiang (yellow card) 45' (goal) 46'	Report	(yellow card) 5' (goal) 56' Cascón; (yellow card) 30' Lo Kwan Yee; 49' Belencoso	Stadium: Mong Kok Stadium (Note: The match will be played at Mong Kok Stadium instead of Eastern Salon's home ground Shing Mun Valley Sports Ground.) (Capacity: 6,680); Attendance: 1,518; Referee: Ng Kai Lam; Assistant referees: Cheng Oi Cho, Sarao Amarjit Singh; Fourth official: Law Bik Chi

9 March 2014 Round 15	Biu Chun Rangers	1 – 4	Kitchee	Sham Shui Po, Kowloon
14:30 UTC+8	Aender (yellow card) 30'; Miroslav 47'; Liu Songwei (yellow card) 90+3'	Report	(yellow card) 14' Dani; 43' (yellow card) 66' Matt Lam; (yellow card) 58' Jang Kyung-Jin; 74', 79' Alex; 90+1' Jordi	Stadium: Sham Shui Po Sports Ground (Capacity: 2,194); Attendance: 681; Referee: Liu Kwok Man; Assistant referees: Chan Ming Siu, Sarao Amarjit Singh; Fourth official: Fong Kwok Hong

16 March 2014 Round 16	Citizen	0 – 2	Kitchee	Tsing Yi, New Territories
17:30 UTC+8	Chan Hin Kwong (yellow card) 21'	Report	12' Cascón; 36' Annan; (yellow card) 57' Dani	Stadium: Tsing Yi Sports Ground (Capacity: 1,500); Attendance: 445; Referee: Tong Kui Sum; Assistant referees: Yu Chun Sun, Fok Pong Shing; Fourth official: Ho Wai Sing

23 March 2014 Round 17	Kitchee	Cancelled	Happy Valley	Mong Kok, Kowloon
17:30 UTC+8				Stadium: Mong Kok Stadium (Capacity: 6,680)

29 March 2014 Round 18	Kitchee	Cancelled	Tuen Mun	Mong Kok, Kowloon
17:30 UTC+8				Stadium: Mong Kok Stadium (Capacity: 6,680)

5 April 2014 Round 19	Sunray Cave JC Sun Hei	0 – 2	Kitchee	Tsing Yi, New Territories
17:30 UTC+8	Wong Chun Hin (yellow card) 17'; Kwok Wing Sun (yellow card) 28'; Su Yang (yellow card) 47'	Report	7' Dani; 90+1' Lam Ka Wai	Stadium: Tsing Yi Sports Ground (Capacity: 1,500); Attendance: 594; Referee: Tong Kui Sum; Assistant referees: Cheng Oi Cho, Ng Wai Hong; Fourth official: Law Bik Chi

17 April 2014 Round 20	Kitchee	1 – 1	South China	Mong Kok, Kowloon
20:00 UTC+8	Wan Chun (yellow card) 12'; Cheung Kin Fung (yellow card) 35'; Tsang Kam To (yellow card) 64'; Cascón 74' (pen.); Matt Lam (yellow card) 80'	Report	62' Dhiego	Stadium: Mong Kok Stadium (Capacity: 6,680); Attendance: 1,767; Referee: Tom Kui Sum; Assistant referees: Cheng Oi Cho, Luk Kin Sun; Fourth official: Tang Hing Fu

3 May 2014 Round 21	Kitchee	v	I-Sky Yuen Long	Mong Kok, Kowloon
17:30 UTC+8				Stadium: Mong Kok Stadium (Capacity: 6,680)

10–11 May 2014 Round 22	Kitchee	v	Yokohama FC Hong Kong	Mong Kok, Kowloon
TBC				Stadium: Mong Kok Stadium (Capacity: 6,680)

=== Senior Shield ===
9 November 2013 1st Round	Kitchee	1 – 2	Biu Chun Rangers	Mong Kok, Kowloon
14:30 UTC+8	Rehman (yellow card) 43'; Lam Ka Wai (yellow card) 64'; Jordi 70'; Dani (yellow card) 85'	Report	2' Lee Kil-Hoon; (yellow card) 43' Tomas; 55' Lam Hok Hei	Stadium: Mong Kok Stadium (Capacity: 6,680); Attendance: 1,099; Referee: Tong Kui Sum; Assistant referees: Lam Chi Ho, Yu Kin Fung; Fourth official: Tang Hing Fu

=== FA Cup ===
26 March 2014 Round of 16	HKFC	0 – 5	Kitchee	Mong Kok, Kowloon
20:00 UTC+8	Ghéczy (yellow card) 30'<>Dilibero (yellow card) 63'; Hampshire (yellow card) 69'	Report	6', 60' (pen.) Alex; 37' (o.g.)Ghéczy; (yellow card) 45+1' Recio; 82' Cheung Kin Fung; 84' Chan Man Fai	Stadium: Mong Kok Stadium (Capacity: 6,680); Attendance: 502; Referee: Tang Hing Fu; Assistant referees: Cheng Oi Cho, Lam Nai Kei; Fourth official: Ng Chiu Kok

13 April 2014 Quarter-finals	South China	0 – 0 (a.e.t.) (1 – 3 p)	Kitchee	Mong Kok, Kowloon
17:30 UTC+8	Lee Chi Ho (yellow card) 30'; Chan Siu Ki (yellow card) 77'; Ticão (yellow card) 83'; Dhiego (yellow card) 87'; Barisic (yellow card) 100'; Kwok Kin Pong (yellow card) 110'; Chan Wai Ho (yellow card) 115'	Report	(yellow card) 31' Xu Deshuai; (yellow card) 84' Alex; (yellow card) 105' Cascón	Stadium: Mong Kok Stadium (Capacity: 6,680); Attendance: 3,125; Referee: Ng Chiu Kok; Assistant referees: Lam Nai Kei, Chan Shui Hung; Fourth official: Lau Fong Hei
	Penalties
	Barisic (penalty scored); Weijl (penalty missed); Lee Hong Lim (penalty missed); Ticão (penalty missed)		(penalty scored) Cascón; (penalty scored) Jordi; (penalty missed) Jang Kyung-Jin; (penalty scored) Annan

27 April 2014 Quarter-finals	Biu Chun Rangers	v	Kitchee	Mong Kok, Kowloon
14:30 UTC+8				Stadium: Mong Kok Stadium (Capacity: 6,680)

=== 2013 AFC Cup ===
==== Quarter-finals ====
The draw of quarter-finals was held on 20 June 2013 in Kuala Lumpur, Malaysia. Kitchee will face Jordan Premier League club Al-Faisaly who were the champions for 2005 and 2006 editions.

17 September 2013 1st leg	Kitchee (Hong Kong)	1 – 2	(Jordan) Al-Faisaly	Mong Kok, Hong Kong
20:00 UTC+8	Huang Yang (yellow card) 31'; Alex 46'; Tsang Kam To (yellow card) 50'; Tsang Chi Hau (yellow card) 68'; Recio (yellow card) 78'	Report (AFC)	20' Souza; (yellow card) 22' (yellow-red card) 63' Khamees; (yellow card) 26' Al-hamdan; 59' Ali Fraeh	Stadium: Mong Kok Stadium (Capacity: 6,680); Attendance: 3,049; Referee: Kim Sang-Woo (Korea Republic); Assistant referees: Jang Jun-Ho (Korea Republic), Lee Jung-Min (Korea Republic); Fourth official: Vo Minh Tri (Vietnam)

24 September 2013 2nd leg	Al-Faisaly (Jordan)	2 – 1 (4 – 2 agg.)	(Hong Kong) Kitchee	Amman, Jordan
19:00 (UTC+3)	Al-Hamdan 18'; Júnior 42'; Adnan (yellow card) 58'; Abu Alieh (yellow card) 73'	Report (AFC)	64' Jordi	Stadium: Amman International Stadium (Capacity: 25,000); Attendance: 4,000; Referee: Banjar Al-Dorsari (Qatar); Assistant referees: Ramzan Al-Naemi (Qatar), Juma Mohammed Al-Burshaid (Qatar); Fourth official: Al-Rawahi (Qatar)

=== 2014 AFC Cup ===
==== Group stage ====
Team	Pld	W	D	L	GF	GA	GD	Pts	KIT	NPT	TAM	PUN
(Hong Kong) Kitchee	6	4	1	1	15	5	+10	13		2–0	4–0	2–2
(Myanmar) Nay Pyi Taw	6	2	2	2	10	10	0	8	1–2		3–1	3–3
(Singapore) Tampines Rovers	6	2	0	4	9	16	−7	6 (Note: Tiebreakers: Tampines Rovers and Pune are ranked on head-to-head record.)	0–5	0–1		3–1
(India) Pune	6	1	3	2	12	15	−3	6	2–0	2–2	2–5	

Notes:

26 February 2014 Matchday 1	Tampines Rovers (Singapore)	0 – 5	(Hong Kong) Kitchee	Kallang, Singapore
19:30 UTC+8	Ang Zhiwei (yellow card) 19'	Report	40', 45+1' Jordi; 47' Chan Man Fai; 56' Xu Deshuai; (yellow card) 72' Tsang Chi Hau; 90' Belencoso	Stadium: Jalan Besar Stadium (Capacity: 8,000); Attendance: 712; Referee: Nagor Amir Noor Mohamed (Malaysia); Assistant referees: Mohd Yusri Muhamad (Malaysia), Mohamad Muazi Zainal Abidin (Malaysia); Fourth official: Suhaizi Shukri (Malaysia)

12 March 2014 Matchday 2	Kitchee (Hong Kong)	2 – 2	(India) Pune	Mong Kok, Hong Kong
20:00 UTC+8	Recio 29'; Belencoso 43'	Report	(yellow card) 46' Ganesh; (yellow card) 47' Angus; 55' Pavlović; 74' Fernandes; (yellow card) 90+4' Amrinder	Stadium: Mong Kok Stadium (Capacity: 6,680); Attendance: 1,837; Referee: Chaiya Mahapab (Thailand); Assistant referees: Binla Preeda (Thailand), Chumpol Deeplang (Thailand); Fourth official: Pechsri Mongkolchai (Thailand)

19 March 2014 Matchday 3	Kitchee (Hong Kong)	2 – 0	(Vietnam) Nay Pyi Taw	Mong Kok, Hong Kong
20:00 UTC+8	Belencoso 8', 46'; Lam Ka Wai (yellow card) 34'; Huang Yang (yellow card) 62'	Report	(yellow card) 12' Aikhena; (yellow card) 24' Chan Chan; (yellow card) 88' Di Piedi	Stadium: Mong Kok Stadium (Capacity: 6,680); Attendance: 1,850; Referee: Nivon Robesh Gamini (Sri Lanka); Assistant referees: Sanjeewa Wellabada (Sri Lanka), Yagi Akane (Japan); Fourth official: T Amaratunge Arachchige (Sri Lanka)

1 April 2014 Matchday 4	Nay Pyi Taw (Vietnam)	1 – 2	(Hong Kong) Kitchee	Nay Pyi Taw, Vietnam
18:00 UTC+6:30	Delgado 12'; Ni Maung Maung Aung (yellow card) 43'; Nyein Tayzar Win (yellow card) 78'	Report	6' Chan Man Fai; (yellow card) 45+1' Wang Zhenpeng; 80' Belencoso	Stadium: Paung Laung Stadium (Capacity: 15,000); Attendance: 850; Referee: Ilgiz Tantashev (Uzbekistan); Assistant referees: Ruslan Serazitdinov (Uzbekistan), Sergei Grishchenko (Uzbekistan); Fourth official: Nivon Robesh Gamini (Sri Lanka)

8 April 2014 Matchday 5	Kitchee (Hong Kong)	4 – 0	(Singapore) Tampines Rovers	Mong Kok, Hong Kong
20:00 UTC+8	Belencoso 34', 62', 85'; Gao Wen (yellow card) 50'; Huang Yang (yellow card) 60'; Cheung Kin Fung (yellow card) 66'; Jordi 81'	Report (AFC); Report (HKFA)	(yellow card) 54' Samat; (yellow card) 68' González	Stadium: Mong Kok Stadium (Capacity: 6,680); Attendance: 1,611; Referee: Tayeb Hasan (Bangladesh); Assistant referees: Ferdous Ahamned (Bangladesh), Md Manir Ahmmad Dhali (Bangladesh); Fourth official: Md Mizanur Rahman (Bangladesh)

22 April 2014 Matchday 6	Pune (India)	v	(Hong Kong) Kitchee	Pune, India
17:00 UTC+5:30		Report		Stadium: Shree Shiv Chhatrapati Sports Complex (Capacity: 22,000)

== See also ==
- List of unbeaten football club seasons
