= 2017–18 Eastern SC season =

Eastern
2017–18 season
- Executive Director: Peter Leung
- Head Coach: (Hong Kong) Szeto Man Chun
- Stadium: Mong Kok Stadium
- Premier League: TBC
- Senior Shield: TBC
- FA Cup: TBC
- Sapling Cup: TBC
Home colours	Away colours

The 2017–18 season is Eastern's 63rd season in the top-tier division in Hong Kong football. Eastern will compete in the Premier League, Senior Challenge Shield, FA Cup and Sapling Cup in this season.

== Current squad ==
As 11 July 2017.

=== First team ===
Note: Flags indicate national team as defined under FIFA eligibility rules; some limited exceptions apply. Players may hold more than one non-FIFA nationality.

No.	Pos.	Nation	Player
1	GK	HKG	Yapp Hung Fai (captain)
2	DF	HKG	Lee Chi Ho (vice captain)
3	MF	BRA	Diego Eli^{FP}
4	MF	HKG	Bai He
5	DF	BRA	Clayton
7	MF	HKG	Xu Deshuai
8	MF	HKG	Chan Siu Kwan
9	FW	ESP	Manolo Bleda^{FP}
10	FW	HKG	Lam Hok Hei
11	FW	BRA	Michel Lugo^{FP}
12	DF	HKG	Tsang Chi Hau
13	DF	HKG	Tse Man Wing
14	MF	HKG	Cheng King Ho

No.	Pos.	Nation	Player
16	GK	HKG	Ho Kwok Chuen
17	FW	HKG	Lee Hong Lim
18	DF	HKG	Cheung Kin Fung
19	MF	HKG	Lo Kong Wai
20	MF	BRA	Vítor Saba^{FP}
21	DF	HKG	Tsang Kam To
23	FW	HKG	Jaimes McKee
24	MF	HKG	Ju Yingzhi
29	MF	HKG	Leung Chun Pong
30	DF	HKG	Wong Tsz Ho
33	GK	HKG	Liang Yuhao
35	DF	HKG	Ng Wai Chiu

=== Reserves ===
Note: Flags indicate national team as defined under FIFA eligibility rules; some limited exceptions apply. Players may hold more than one non-FIFA nationality.

No.	Pos.	Nation	Player
16	GK	HKG	Ho Kwok Chuen
33	GK	HKG	Liang Yuhao
35	DF	HKG	Ng Wai Chiu
25	DF	HKG	Tse Long Hin
26	DF	HKG	Wong Chin Hung
13	DF	HKG	Tse Man Wing
36	DF	HKG	Lee Ka Wah
47	DF	HKG	Lo Kai Wah
48	DF	HKG	Lai Kai Cheuk

No.	Pos.	Nation	Player
8	MF	HKG	Li Ka Chun
27	MF	HKG	Wong Chun Hin
46	MF	HKG	Szeto Man Chun
41	MF	HKG	Lo Chi Kwan
42	MF	HKG	Lee Kin Wo
45	MF	HKG	Lee Sze Ming
44	MF	HKG	Wong Chun Yu
43	MF	HKG	Yeung Hei Chi
40	FW	HKG	Au Wai Lun
31	FW	HKG	Cheng Siu Wai
32	FW	HKG	Naveed

== Competitions ==
Win Draw Loss

=== Hong Kong Premier League ===
==== Table ====
Pos	Team	Pld	W	D	L	GF	GA	GD	Pts
3	Pegasus	18	10	4	4	37	26	+11	34
4	Eastern	18	9	1	8	34	25	+9	28
5	Southern	18	8	2	8	28	27	+1	26

Updated to match(es) played on 13 May 2018. Source: Hong Kong Football Association
Rules for classification: 1) Points; 2) Head-to-head points; 3) Head-to-head goal difference; 4) Head-to-head goals scored; 5) Goal difference; 6) Goals scored; 7) Fair-play points; 8) Drawing lots (Play-off if the winner has to be decided)

==== Results by round ====
Round	1	2	3	4	5	6	7	8	9	10	11	12	13	14	15	16	17	18
Ground	A																	
Result	L																	
Position	9																	

Updated to match(es) played on 25 August 2017. Source: Competitive Matches
A = Away; H = Home; W = Win; D = Draw; L = Loss

==== Results summary ====
Overall								Home						Away					
Pld	W	D	L	GF	GA	GD	Pts	W	D	L	GF	GA	GD	W	D	L	GF	GA	GD
1	0	0	1	0	1	−1	0	0	0	0	0	0	0	0	0	1	0	1	−1

Last updated: 25 August 2017.
Source: Competitive Matches

==== League Matches ====
25 August 2016 1	Kitchee	1–0	Eastern Long Lions	Mong Kok, Kowloon
20:00 (UTC+8)	Vadócz 70'	Report		Stadium: Mong Kok Stadium; Attendance: 4,397; Referee: Lau Fong Hei
