= 2015–16 Eastern SC season =

Eastern
2015–16 season
- Chairman: Lam Kin Ming
- Head Coach: (Hong Kong) Yeung Ching Kwong
- Home Ground: Mong Kok Stadium (Capacity: 6,680)
- Premier League: 1st
- Senior Shield: Winners
- FA Cup: Quarter-finals
Home colours	Away colours

The 2015–16 season is Eastern's 61st season in the top-tier division in Hong Kong football. Eastern will compete in the Premier League, Senior Challenge Shield and FA Cup in this season.

== Key events ==
- 31 May 2015: Hong Kong defender Leung Chi Wing retires from professional football.
- 31 May 2015: Hong Kong striker Yiu Hok Man retires from professional football.
- 1 June 2015: Hong Kong defender Man Pei Tak retires from professional football.
- 1 June 2015: Hong Kong midfielder Ju Yingzhi joins the club from Sun Pegasus on a free transfer.
- 3 June 2015: Hong Kong defender Cheng King Ho joins the club from I-Sky Yuen Long on a free transfer.
- 9 June 2015: Australian striker Dylan Macallister leaves the club and joins Rockdale City Suns on a free transfer.
- 10 June 2015: South Korea midfielder Han Jae-woong joins the club from Biu Chun Rangers for an undisclosed fee.
- 10 June 2015: Hong Kong midfielder Leung Tsz Chun leaves the club and joins KC Southern for an undisclosed fee.
- 12 June 2015: Cameroon-born Hong Kong midfielder Eugene Mbome joins the club from Biu Chun Rangers on a free transfer.
- 12 June 2015: Hong Kong midfielder Xu Deshuai joins the club from Kitchee for an undisclosed fee.
- 16 June 2015: English striker Rohan Ricketts leaves the club after contract expires.
- 19 June 2015: Hong Kong goalkeeper Ho Kwok Chuen joins the club from Sun Pegasus on a free transfer.
- 23 June 2015: Nigerian defender Festus Baise joins the club from Sun Pegasus on a free transfer.
- 24 June 2015: Australian striker Andrew Barisic joins the club from Melbourne Knights for an undisclosed fee.
- 24 June 2015: Hong Kong Liang Zicheng leaves the club and joins South China for an undisclosed fee.
- 30 June 2015: Hong Kong midfielder Lee Hong Lim joins the club from Sun Pegasus on a free transfer.
- 3 July 2015: Hong Kong goalkeeper Liang Yuhao joins the club from Wofoo Tai Po on a free transfer.
- 8 July 2015: Hong Kong defender Tsang Chi Hau joins the club from Kitchee for an undisclosed fee.
- 9 July 2015: Hong Kong defender Tsang Kam To joins the club from Kitchee for an undisclosed fee.
- 9 July 2015: Hong Kong defender Kwok Kin Pong leaves the club and joins Pegasus for an undisclosed fee.
- 11 July 2015: Hong Kong midfielder Luk Chi Ho Michael leaves the club and joins KC Southern for an undisclosed fee.
- 17 July 2015: Hong Kong defender Leung Kwok Wai leaves the club and joins Dream Metro Gallery on a free transfer.
- 21 July 2015: Hong Kong defender Pak Wing Chak retires from professional football.
- 23 July 2015: Hong Kong defender Lee Chi Ho leaves the club and joins Biu Chun Rangers on a free transfer.
- 23 July 2015: Hong Kong goalkeeper Li Hon Ho leaves the club and joins Tai Po on a free transfer.

== Players ==
=== Squad information ===
N	P	Nat.	Name	Date of birth	Age	Since	Previous club	Notes
1	GK	(Hong Kong)	Yapp Hung Fai^{LP}	21 March 1990	25	2014	(Hong Kong) South China	Club captain
2	DF	(Hong Kong)	Jean-Jacques Kilama^{LP}	13 October 1985	29	2014	(Hong Kong) Sunray Cave JC Sun Hei	
3	MF	(Brazil)	Diego Eli Moreira^{FP}	4 September 1988	26	2013	(Hong Kong) Tuen Mun	
5	DF	(Brazil)	Clayton Michel Afonso^{FP}	18 July 1988	27	2013	(Hong Kong) Wofoo Tai Po	
6	DF	(Hong Kong)	Wong Chin Hung^{LP}	2 March 1982	33	2013	(Hong Kong) Biu Chun Rangers	
7	MF	(Hong Kong)	Xu Deshuai^{LP}	13 July 1987	28	2015	(Hong Kong) Kitchee	
8	MF	(Croatia)	Miroslav Saric^{FP}	7 February 1986	29	2014	(Hong Kong) Biu Chun Rangers	
9	MF	(South Korea)	Han Jae-woong^{FP}	28 September 1984	30	2015	(Hong Kong) Biu Chun Rangers	
13	DF	(Hong Kong)	Tse Man Wing^{LP}	5 January 1983	32	2013	(Hong Kong) Royal Southern	
14	DF	(Hong Kong)	Cheng King Ho^{LP}	17 November 1989	25	2015	(Hong Kong) I-Sky Yuen Long	
15	DF	(Brazil)	Beto^{FP}	10 July 1984	31	2013	(Hong Kong) Tuen Mun	
16	GK	(Hong Kong)	Ho Kwok Chuen^{LP}	20 February 1977	38	2015	(Hong Kong) Sun Pegasus	
17	MF	(Hong Kong)	Lee Hong Lim^{LP}	29 September 1983	31	2015	(Hong Kong) Sun Pegasus	
19	FW	(Hong Kong)	Cheng Siu Wai^{LP}	27 December 1981	33	2013	(Hong Kong) Kitchee	
20	MF	(Hong Kong)	Li Ka Chun^{LP}	10 September 1993	21	2014 (Winter)	(Hong Kong) Biu Chun Rangers	
21	DF	(Hong Kong)	Tsang Kam To^{LP}	21 June 1989	26	2015	(Hong Kong) Kitchee	
22	FW	(Brazil)	Giovane Alves da Silva^{FP}	25 November 1982	32	2013	(Hong Kong) Biu Chun Rangers	
24	MF	(Hong Kong)	Ju Yingzhi^{LP}	24 July 1987	28	2015	(Hong Kong) Sun Pegasus	
27	FW	(Australia)	Andrew Barisic^{LP}	22 March 1986	29	2015	(Australia) Melbourne Knights	
28	DF	(Hong Kong)	Wong Chi Chung^{LP}	11 October 1982	32	2014 (Winter)	(Hong Kong) Tuen Mun	
32	MF	(Hong Kong)	Lo Chi Kwan^{LP}	18 March 1981	34	2014	(Hong Kong) Royal Southern	
33	GK	(Hong Kong)	Liang Yuhao^{LP}	3 March 1993	22	2015	(Hong Kong) Wofoo Tai Po	
77	DF	(Hong Kong)	Festus Baise^{LP}	11 April 1980	35	2015	(Hong Kong) Sun Pegasus	
88	MF	(Hong Kong)	Andy Nägelein^{LP}	5 October 1981	33	2015 (Winter)	(China) Hunan Billows	
	MF	(Cameroon)	Eugene Mbome^{LP}	29 August 1986	29	2015	(Hong Kong) Biu Chun Rangers	

Last update: 28 July 2015
Source: South China Football Team
Ordered by squad number.
^{LP}Local player; ^{FP}Foreign player; ^{NR}Non-registered player

== Transfers ==
=== In ===
==== Summer ====
No.	Pos	Player	Transferred From	Fee	Date	Source
24	MF	(Hong Kong) Ju Yingzhi	(Hong Kong) Sun Pegasus	Free transfer	1 June 2015	
14	DF	(Hong Kong) Cheng King Ho	(Hong Kong) I-Sky Yuen Long	Free transfer	3 June 2015	
9	MF	(South Korea) Han Jae-woong	(Hong Kong) Biu Chun Rangers	Undisclosed	10 June 2015	
	MF	(Cameroon) Eugene Mbome	(Hong Kong) Biu Chun Rangers	Free transfer	12 June 2015	
7	MF	(Hong Kong) Xu Deshuai	(Hong Kong) Kitchee	Undisclosed	12 June 2015	
77	DF	(Hong Kong) Festus Baise	(Hong Kong) Sun Pegasus	Free transfer	23 June 2015	
27	FW	(Australia) Andrew Barisic	(Australia) Melbourne Knights	Undisclosed	24 June 2015	
17	MF	(Hong Kong) Lee Hong Lim	(Hong Kong) Sun Pegasus	Free transfer	30 June 2015	
33	GK	(Hong Kong) Liang Yuhao	(Hong Kong) Wofoo Tai Po	Free transfer	3 July 2015	
12	DF	(Hong Kong) Tsang Chi Hau	(Hong Kong) Kitchee	Undisclosed	8 July 2015	
21	DF	(Hong Kong) Tsang Kam To	(Hong Kong) Kitchee	Undisclosed	9 July 2015	

=== Out ===
==== Summer ====
No.	Pos	Player	Transferred To	Fee	Date	Source
33	DF	(Hong Kong) Leung Chi Wing	Retired	N/A	31 May 2015	
29	FW	(Hong Kong) Yiu Hok Man	Retired	N/A	31 May 2015	
12	DF	(Hong Kong) Man Pei Tak	Retired	N/A	1 June 2015	
9	FW	(Australia) Dylan Macallister	(Australia) Rockdale City Suns	Free transfer	9 June 2015	
26	MF	(Hong Kong) Leung Tsz Chun	(Hong Kong) KC Southern	Undisclosed	10 June 2015	
11	FW	(England) Rohan Ricketts		End of contract	16 June 2015	
18	MF	(Hong Kong) Liang Zicheng	(Hong Kong) South China	Undisclosed	24 June 2015	
21	DF	(Hong Kong) Kwok Kin Pong	(Hong Kong) Pegasus	Undisclosed	7 July 2015	
10	MF	(Hong Kong) Luk Michael Chi Ho	(Hong Kong) KC Southern	Undisclosed	11 July 2015	
23	DF	(Hong Kong) Leung Kwok Wai	(Hong Kong) Dream Metro Gallery	Free transfer	17 July 2015	
	DF	(Hong Kong) Pak Wing Chak	Retired	N/A	21 July 2015	
14	DF	(Hong Kong) Lee Chi Ho	(Hong Kong) Biu Chun Rangers	Free transfer	23 July 2015	
17	GK	(Hong Kong) Li Hon Ho	(Hong Kong) Tai Po	Free transfer	23 July 2015	

=== Loan In ===
==== Summer ====
No.	Pos	Player	Loaned From	Start	End	Source

=== Loan Out ===
==== Summer ====
No.	Pos	Player	Loaned To	Start	End	Source

== Club ==
=== Coaching staff ===
Position	Staff
Head Coach	(Hong Kong) Yeung Ching Kwong
Assistant Coach	(Hong Kong) Leung Chi Wing
Assistant Coach	(Hong Kong) Lai Kai Cheuk
Assistant Coach	(Hong Kong) Wong Chun Yu
Assistant Coach	(Hong Kong) Chan Yuen Ting
Goalkeeper Coach	(Hong Kong) Chung Ho Yin

Last updated: 30 July 2015
Source: Eastern SC

== Squad statistics ==
=== Overall Stats ===
	League	Senior Shield	FA Cup	Total Stats
Games played	0	0	0	0
Games won	0	0	0	0
Games drawn	0	0	0	0
Games lost	0	0	0	0
Goals for	0	0	0	0
Goals against	0	0	0	0
Players used	0	0	0	0
Yellow cards	0	0	0	0
Red cards	0	0	0	0

Last updated: 25 July 2015
Source: Player Stats

=== Appearances and goals ===
Key

No. = Squad number

Pos. = Playing position

Nat. = Nationality

Apps = Appearances

GK = Goalkeeper

DF = Defender

MF = Midfielder

FW = Forward

Numbers in parentheses denote appearances as substitute. Players with number struck through and marked † left the club during the playing season.

As of 30 July 2015

No.	Pos.	Nat.	Name	Premier League		Senior Shield		FA Cup		League Cup		Total	
No.	Pos.	Nat.	Name	Apps	Goals	Apps	Goals	Apps	Goals	Apps	Goals	Apps	Goals
1	GK	HKG	Yapp Hung Fai	0	0	0	0	0	0	0	0	0	0
2	DF	HKG	Jean-Jacques Kilama	0	0	0	0	0	0	0	0	0	0
3	DF	BRA	Diego Eli Moreira	0	0	0	0	0	0	0	0	0	0
5	DF	BRA	Clayton Michel Afonso	0	0	0	0	0	0	0	0	0	0
6	DF	HKG	Wong Chin Hung	0	0	0	0	0	0	0	0	0	0
7	MF	HKG	Xu Deshuai	0	0	0	0	0	0	0	0	0	0
8	MF	CRO	Miroslav Saric	0	0	0	0	0	0	0	0	0	0
9	MF	KOR	Han Jae-woong	0	0	0	0	0	0	0	0	0	0
13	DF	HKG	Tse Man Wing	0	0	0	0	0	0	0	0	0	0
14	DF	HKG	Cheng King Ho	0	0	0	0	0	0	0	0	0	0
15	DF	BRA	Beto	0	0	0	0	0	0	0	0	0	0
16	GK	HKG	Ho Kwok Chuen	0	0	0	0	0	0	0	0	0	0
17	MF	HKG	Lee Hong Lim	0	0	0	0	0	0	0	0	0	0
19	FW	HKG	Cheng Siu Wai	0	0	0	0	0	0	0	0	0	0
20	MF	HKG	Li Ka Chun	0	0	0	0	0	0	0	0	0	0
21	DF	HKG	Tsang Kam To	0	0	0	0	0	0	0	0	0	0
22	FW	BRA	Giovane Alves da Silva	0	0	0	0	0	0	0	0	0	0
24	MF	HKG	Ju Yingzhi	0	0	0	0	0	0	0	0	0	0
27	FW	AUS	Andrew Barisic	0	0	0	0	0	0	0	0	0	0
28	DF	HKG	Wong Chi Chung	0	0	0	0	0	0	0	0	0	0
32	MF	HKG	Lo Chi Kwan	0	0	0	0	0	0	0	0	0	0
33	GK	HKG	Liang Yuhao	0	0	0	0	0	0	0	0	0	0
77	DF	HKG	Festus Baise	0	0	0	0	0	0	0	0	0	0
88	MF	HKG	Andy Nägelein	0	0	0	0	0	0	0	0	0	0

=== Top scorers ===
Last updated: 25 July 2015.
Source: Hong Kong Football Association

The list is sorted by shirt number when total goals are equal.

Rnk	Pos	No.	Player	Premier League	Senior Shield	FA Cup	Total
Own goals							
TOTALS							

=== Disciplinary record ===
Includes all competitive matches.Players listed below made at least one appearance for Southern first squad during the season.

N	P	Nat.	Name	League			Shield			FA Cup			Others			Total			Notes
N	P	Nat.	Name	Yellow card	Second yellow card	Red card	Yellow card	Second yellow card	Red card	Yellow card	Second yellow card	Red card	Yellow card	Second yellow card	Red card	Yellow card	Second yellow card	Red card	Notes

Last updated: 25 July 2015
Source: Competitive matches
Ordered by (red card) , (second yellow card) and (yellow card)
(yellow card) = Number of bookings; (second yellow card) = Number of sending offs after a second yellow card; (red card) = Number of sending offs by a direct red card.

=== Substitution Record ===
Includes all competitive matches.

			League		Shield		FA Cup		Others		Total	
No.	Pos	Name	subson	subsoff	subson	subsoff	subson	subsoff	subson	subsoff	subson	subsoff
Goalkeepers
1	GK	Yapp Hung Fai	0	0	0	0	0	0	0	0	0	0
16	GK	Ho Kwok Chuen	0	0	0	0	0	0	0	0	0	0
33	GK	Liang Yuhao	0	0	0	0	0	0	0	0	0	0
Defenders
2	CB	Jean-Jacques Kilama	0	0	0	0	0	0	0	0	0	0
5	CB	Clayton Michel Afonso	0	0	0	0	0	0	0	0	0	0
6	LB	Wong Chin Hung	0	0	0	0	0	0	0	0	0	0
13	LB	Tse Man Wing	0	0	0	0	0	0	0	0	0	0
14	RB	Cheng King Ho	0	0	0	0	0	0	0	0	0	0
15	CB	Beto	0	0	0	0	0	0	0	0	0	0
21	RB	Tsang Kam To	0	0	0	0	0	0	0	0	0	0
28	CB	Wong Chi Chung	0	0	0	0	0	0	0	0	0	0
77	CB	Festus Baise	0	0	0	0	0	0	0	0	0	0
Midfielders
3	DM	Diego Eli Moreira	0	0	0	0	0	0	0	0	0	0
7	RM	Xu Deshuai	0	0	0	0	0	0	0	0	0	0
8	AM	Miroslav Saric	0	0	0	0	0	0	0	0	0	0
9	LM	Han Jae-woong	0	0	0	0	0	0	0	0	0	0
17	RM	Lee Hong Lim	0	0	0	0	0	0	0	0	0	0
20	CM	Li Ka Chun	0	0	0	0	0	0	0	0	0	0
24	CM	Ju Yingzhi	0	0	0	0	0	0	0	0	0	0
32	CM	Lo Chi Kwan	0	0	0	0	0	0	0	0	0	0
88	DM	Andy Nägelein	0	0	0	0	0	0	0	0	0	0
Forwards
19	CF	Cheng Siu Wai	0	0	0	0	0	0	0	0	0	0
22	CF	Giovane Alves da Silva	0	0	0	0	0	0	0	0	0	0
27	CF	Andrew Barisic	0	0	0	0	0	0	0	0	0	0

Last updated: 30 July 2015

=== Captains ===
No.	P	Name	Country	No. games	Notes

Last updated: 25 July 2015
Source: Competitive match reports.
Competitive matches only
Matches started as captain only
Country: FIFA nationality; No.: Squad number; P: Position; Name: Player name; No. Games: Number of games started as captain.

== Competitions ==
=== Overall ===
Competition	Started round	Current position / round	Final position / round	First match	Last match
Hong Kong Premier League	—	4th		12 September 2015	
Senior Shield	—	—			
FA Cup	—	—			

Updated to match played 25 July 2015
Source: Competitions

=== First Division League ===
==== Classification ====
Pos	Team	Pld	W	D	L	GF	GA	GD	Pts	Qualification or relegation
1	Eastern	16	12	2	2	35	13	+22	38	Qualification to Champions League group stage
2	Kitchee	16	11	4	1	32	11	+21	37	Qualification to season play-off and Champions League preliminary round 2
3	South China	16	9	2	5	26	21	+5	29	Qualification to season play-off (Note: Since the winners of the Senior Shield, Eastern, and the winners of the League Cup, Kitchee, qualified for AFC competitions and the Season Play-off respectively based on league position, the spots awarded to the Senior Shield winner and the League Cup winner for the Season Play-off were awarded to the third and fourth placed team in the league. Pegasus qualified as winners of the FA Cup.)
4	Southern	16	6	5	5	26	21	+5	23	Qualification to season play-off
5	Pegasus	16	4	5	7	22	27	−5	17	Qualification to season play-off

Source: Hong Kong Football Association
Rules for classification: 1) Points; 2) Head-to-head points; 3) Head-to-head goal difference; 4) Head-to-head goals scored; 5) Goal difference; 6) Goals scored; 7) Fair-play points; 8) Drawing lots (Play-off if the winner has to be decided)

==== Results summary ====
Overall								Home						Away					
Pld	W	D	L	GF	GA	GD	Pts	W	D	L	GF	GA	GD	W	D	L	GF	GA	GD
0	0	0	0	0	0	0	0	0	0	0	0	0	0	0	0	0	0	0	0

Last updated: 25 July 2015.
Source: Premier League
