= 2008 Hong Kong–Macau Interport =

The 64th Hong Kong–Macau Interport was held in Macau on 15 June 2008. Hong Kong captured the champion by winning 1–0.

== Squads ==
=== Hong Kong ===
- Director: Lee Fai Lap
- Administrative Secretary: Joseph Ko
- Head coach: (Croatia) Goran Paulić
- Assistant coach: Lo Kai Wah
- Goalkeeper coach: Liu Chun Fai
- Physio: Lui Yat Hong
- Assistant: Kwan Kon San

No.	Pos.	Player	Date of birth (age)	Caps	Club
	GK	Li Hon Ho	14 July 1986 (age 21)		(Hong Kong) Wofoo Tai Po
	GK	Leung Hing Kit	22 October 1989 (age 18)		(Hong Kong) Bulova Rangers
	GK	Cheung King Wah	6 July 1986 (age 21)		(Hong Kong) Convoy Sun Hei
	DF	Chak Ting Fung	27 November 1989 (age 18)		(Hong Kong) Bulova Rangers
	DF	Leung Kam Fai	17 July 1986 (age 21)		(Hong Kong) Wofoo Tai Po
	DF	Chan Hin Kwong	27 February 1988 (age 20)		(Hong Kong) Wofoo Tai Po
	DF	Lai Man Fei	10 December 1988 (age 19)		(Hong Kong) South China
	DF	So Wai Chuen	26 March 1988 (age 19)		(Hong Kong) Workable
	MF	Lau Nim Yat	4 December 1989 (age 18)		(Hong Kong) Workable
	MF	Yuen Kin Man	19 January 1989 (age 19)		(Hong Kong) Workable
	MF	Kwok Kin Pong	30 March 1987 (age 20)		(Hong Kong) South China
	MF	Leung Chun Pong	1 October 1986 (age 21)		(Hong Kong) Happy Valley
	MF	Lai Yiu Cheong	25 September 1988 (age 19)		(Hong Kong) Bulova Rangers
	MF	Chan Siu Yuen	2 November 1987 (age 20)		(Hong Kong) Bulova Rangers
	MF	Cheng King Ho	7 November 1989 (age 18)		(Hong Kong) South China
	MF	Chan Ka Chun	16 August 1988 (age 19)		(Hong Kong) South China
	MF	Yeung Chi Lun	20 November 1989 (age 18)		Hong Kong C Team
	FW	Yu Ho Pong	19 August 1989 (age 18)		(Hong Kong) Eastern
	FW	To Hon To	4 April 1989 (age 19)		(Hong Kong) Bulova Rangers
	FW	Lau Ka Shing	13 August 1989 (age 18)		(Hong Kong) Bulova Rangers

=== Macau ===
- Head coach: (Hong Kong) Leung Sui Wing

== Results ==
2008-06-15
16:00 UTC+8

Macau	0 – 1	Hong Kong
	Report (in Chinese)	So Wai Chuen 66'

Estádio Campo Desportivo, Macau
