= 2014–15 Hong Kong League Cup final =

2014-15 Hong Kong League Cup final
- Event: 2014–15 Hong Kong League Cup
South China	Kitchee
0	4
- Date: 22 April 2015
- Venue: Mong Kok Stadium, Mong Kok
- Attendance: 5,082

The 2014–15 Hong Kong League Cup final was a football match that took place on 22 April 2015 at Mong Kok Stadium, Hong Kong. It was the final match of the 2014–15 Hong Kong League Cup, a football competition for the teams in the Hong Kong Premier League.

== Details ==
22 April 2015
20:00 GMT+8

South China	0-4	Kitchee
		Paulinho 5', 12'; Belencoso 77'; Jordi 90+6'

Mong Kok Stadium, Mong Kok
Attendance: 5,082
Referee: Tong Kui Sum

South China	Kitchee

GK	12	(Ecuador) Cristian Mora
RB	2	(Hong Kong) Jack Sealy
CB	15	(Hong Kong) Chan Wai Ho (c)
CB	6	(England) Andy Russell		(substituted off) 54'
LB	5	(Hong Kong) Chak Ting Fung		(substituted off) 74'
RW	14	(Japan) Yuto Nakamura	(yellow card) 3'
AM	11	(Brazil) Itaparica		(substituted off) 46'
AM	17	(Hong Kong) Leung Chun Pong	(yellow card) 70'
LW	24	(Hong Kong) Lo Kong Wai	(yellow card) 70'
CF	7	(Hong Kong) Chan Siu Ki
CF	38	(Australia) Daniel McBreen
Substitutes:
GK	25	(Hong Kong) Tin Man Ho
DF	4	(Republic of Ireland) Sean Tse		(substituted on) 46'
MF	16	(Hong Kong) Chan Siu Kwan
DF	22	(Serbia) Bojan Mališić
DF	23	(Hong Kong) Che Runqiu		(substituted on) 74'
FW	30	(Brazil) Detinho		(substituted on) 54'
FW	31	(Hong Kong) Cheng Lai Hin
Head Coach:
(Argentina) Roberto Carlos Mario Gómez

GK	1	(Hong Kong) Wang Zhenpeng
RB	12	(Hong Kong) Lo Kwan Yee (c)
CB	2	(Spain) Fernando Recio
CB	5	(Brazil) Hélio
LB	3	(Spain) Dani Cancela
RW	19	(Hong Kong) Huang Yang
CM	20	(Canada) Matt Lam
LW	17	(Brazil) Paulinho	(substituted off) 75'
CF	15	(Hong Kong) Christian Annan	(substituted off) 70'
CF	9	(Spain) Juan Belencoso	(substituted off) 87'
CF	18	(Spain) Jordi Tarrés
Substitutes:
GK	23	(Hong Kong) Guo Jianqiao
MF	10	(Hong Kong) Lam Ka Wai
DF	13	(Hong Kong) Cheung Kin Fung	(substituted on) 70'
DF	21	(Hong Kong) Tsang Kam To
MF	22	(Hong Kong) Emmet Wan Chun	(substituted on) 75'
DF	44	(South Korea) Kim Tae-min
FW	88	(Spain) Borja Rubiato	(substituted on) 87'
Head Coach:
(Spain) José Francisco Molina

Match rules

- 90 minutes.
- 30 minutes of extra time if necessary.
- Penalty shoot-out if scores still level.
- Seven named substitutes, of which three may be used.

== See also ==
- The Hong Kong Football Association
- Hong Kong Premier League
