= 2009 Hong Kong–Macau Interport =

The 65th Hong Kong Macau Interport was held in Hong Kong on 20 June 2009. Hong Kong captured the champion by winning 5-1.

== Squads ==
=== Hong Kong ===
- Head coach: Goran Paulić
- Assistant coach: Yan Lik Kin
- Fitness coach: Lee Ping Hung
- Goalkeeper coach: Chu Kwok Kuen
- Physio: Lui Yat Hong
- Assistant: Kwan Kon San

No.	Pos.	Player	Date of birth (age)	Caps	Club
1	GK	Li Hon Ho	14 July 1986 (age 22)		(Hong Kong) NT Realty Wofoo Tai Po
2	DF	Chan Siu Yuen	2 November 1987 (age 22)		(Hong Kong) Fourway
3	DF	Fung Kai Hong	25 January 1986 (age 23)		(Hong Kong) Citizen
4	DF	Chak Ting Fung	27 November 1989 (age 19)		(Hong Kong) Fourway
5	DF	Leung Kam Fai	17 July 1986 (age 22)		(Hong Kong) Shatin
6	MF	Yeung Chi Lun	20 November 1989 (age 19)		(Hong Kong) Citizen
7	MF	Iu Wai	9 November 1991 (age 17)		(Hong Kong) Fourway
8	DF	Pak Wing Chak	23 April 1990 (age 19)		(Hong Kong) Eastern
9	FW	Cheng Lai Hin	31 March 1986 (age 23)		(Hong Kong) Kitchee
10	FW	Yu Ho Pong	19 August 1989 (age 19)		(Hong Kong) Eastern
11	FW	To Hon To	4 April 1989 (age 20)		(Hong Kong) Fourway
12	MF	Ip Chung Long	16 November 1989 (age 19)		(Hong Kong) Kitchee
13	MF	Chan Man Fai	19 June 1988 (age 21)		(Hong Kong) Kitchee
14	DF	So Wai Chuen	26 March 1988 (age 21)		(Hong Kong) Eastern
15	MF	Lau Ka Shing	13 August 1989 (age 19)		(Hong Kong) Fourway
16	MF	Leung Chun Pong	1 October 1986 (age 22)		(Hong Kong) Happy Valley
18	FW	Tsang Kam To	21 June 1989 (age 19)		(Hong Kong) Kitchee
19	GK	Leung Hing Kit	22 October 1989 (age 19)		(Hong Kong) Fourway

=== Macau ===
No.	Pos.	Player	Date of birth (age)	Caps	Club
1	GK	Tai Chou Tek			
4		Lei Weng Chi			
5	DF	Lam Ka Pou	10 July 1985 (age 23)		
6	DF	Geofredo de Sousa Cheung	18 May 1979 (age 30)		
7	MF	Cheang Cheng Ieong Paulo	18 August 1984 (age 24)		
12		Ho Man Hou			
13	MF	Sio Ka Un	16 March 1992 (age 17)		
14	MF	Vervon Wong			
15		Chan Pak Chun			
16		Lao Pak Kin			
17		Loi Wai Hong			
18		Lei Ka Kei			
19	MF	Chan Kin Seng	19 March 1985 (age 24)		(Macau) Windsor Arch Ka I
20	MF	Leong Chon In			
21		Chong Chi Chio			
22	GK	Chan Ka Kei			
23		Luis Amorim da Silva Hung			
24		Lei Kam Hong			

== Results ==
20 June 2009
16:00 UTC+8

Hong Kong	5 – 1	Macau
Yeung Chi Lun 13'; Pak Wing Chak 21'; Leung Kam Fai 63' (pen.); Leung Chun Pong 65'; To Hon To 84'	(Match Stat.) (Report) (in Chinese)	Ho Man Hou 28'

Mong Kok Stadium, Hong Kong
Attendance: 350
Referee: Ng Kai Lam (Hong Kong)
