= Emmet Wan =

Hong Kong footballer

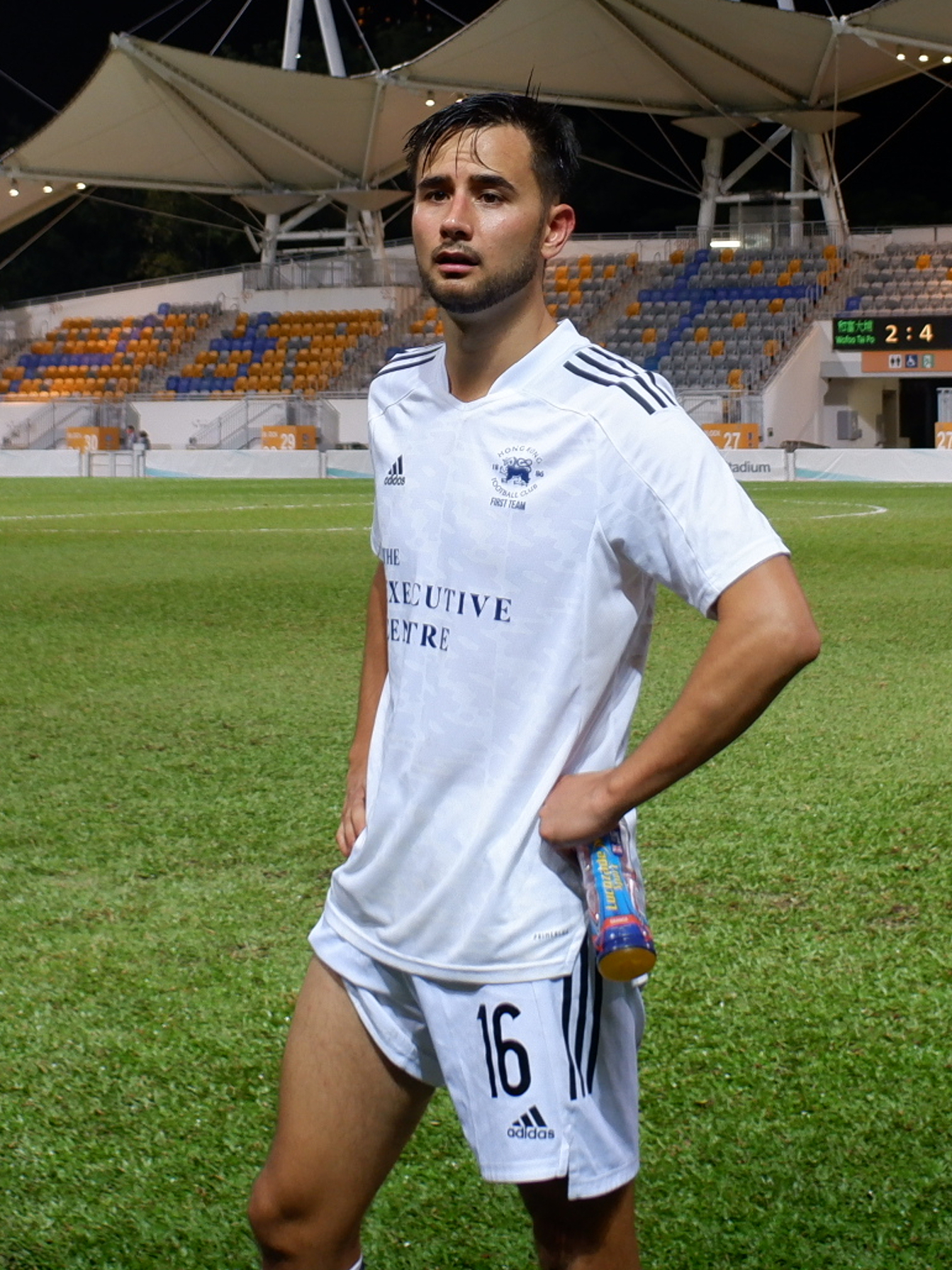

Personal information
- Full name: Emmet Chun-Shan Patrick Wan-Mackey
- Date of birth: 26 March 1992 (age 34)
- Place of birth: Cork, Ireland
- Height: 1.81 m (5 ft 11 in)
- Positions: Defensive midfielder; centre back

Youth career
- 2008–2009: Friar Lane & Epworth

Senior career*
Years	Team	Apps	(Gls)
2013–2018	Kitchee	8	(0)
2015–2016	→ Southern (loan)	14	(1)
2016	→ Pegasus (loan)	0	(0)
2017–2018	→ Lee Man (loan)	3	(0)
2018–2019	Southern	7	(0)
2020	Citizen	0	(0)
2020–2021	HKFC	7	(1)
2022–2024	HKFC	32	(0)
2024–2025	Eastern District	18	(0)
2025–	South China	21	(1)

International career
2014	Hong Kong U22	2	(0)
- * Club domestic league appearances and goals as of 18 May 2026

Emmet Wan (Chinese: 溫俊, born 26 March 1992) is a former professional footballer who played as a defensive midfielder or a centre back. Born in Ireland, he represented Hong Kong at youth level.

== Club career ==
=== Kitchee ===
Wan joined Kitchee in 2013. Soon he raised the interest of Kim Pan-gon to pick him for the Hong Kong national under-23 football team as he holds a Hong Kong SAR passport.

=== Southern ===
After three loan spells in five years, Wan left Kitchee in 2018 for a permanent move to fellow Hong Kong club Southern.

=== HKFC ===
On 16 August 2022, it was reported that Wan would return to HKFC to play in the Hong Kong Premier League.

== International career ==
In the summer of 2014, Wan was selected by Hong Kong national under-23 football team coach Kim Pan Gon to play in the 2014 Asian Games football tournament. He took part in the warm-up match against Newcastle United under-21 team. He played in the last 16 match against South Korea.
