= To Hon To =

Hong Kong footballer (born 1989)

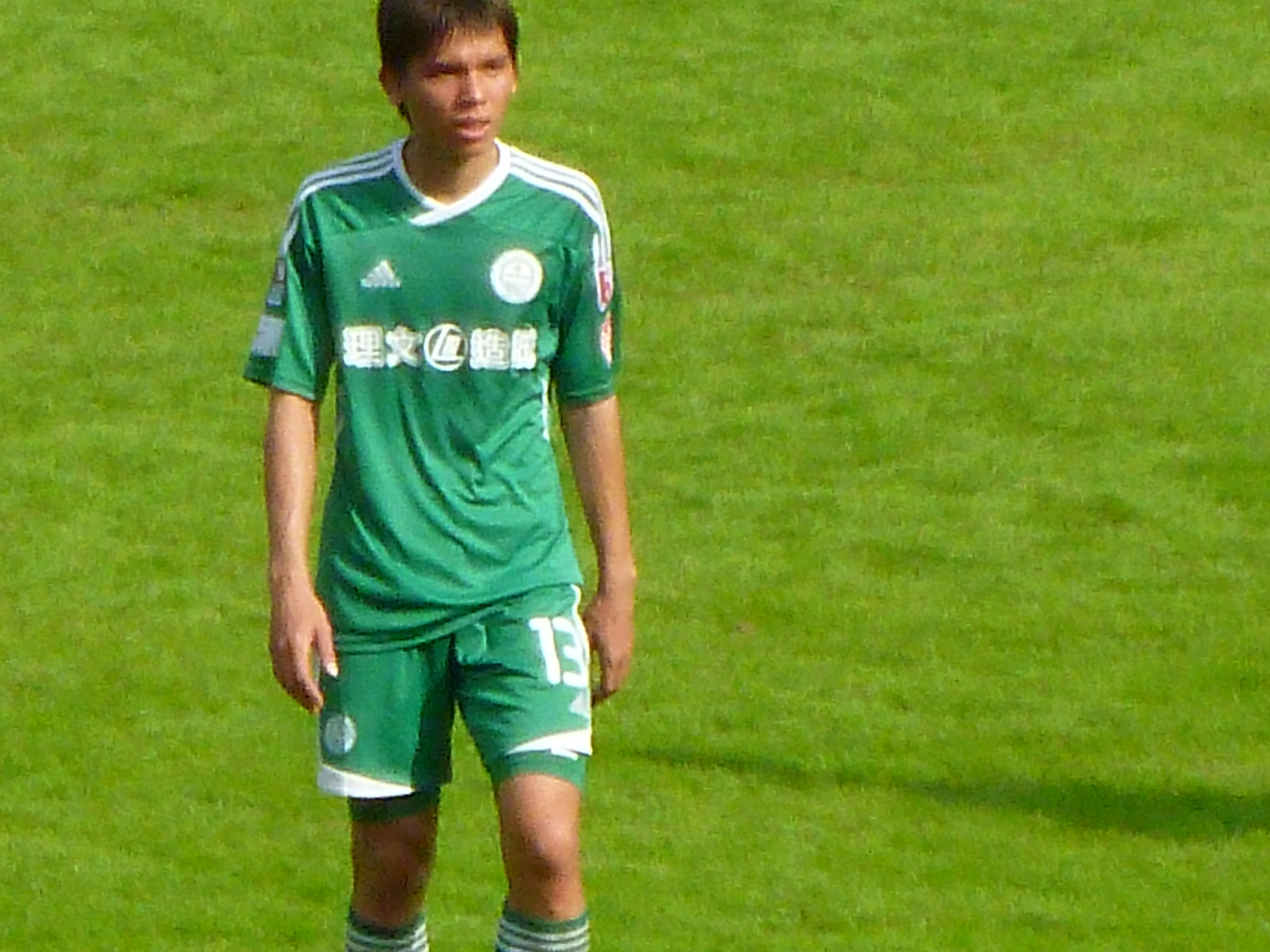
- To playing for Tai Po in March 2012.

Personal information
- Full name: To Hon To
- Date of birth: 4 April 1989 (age 37)
- Place of birth: Hong Kong
- Height: 1.77 m (5 ft 10 in)
- Position: Second striker

Youth career
- –2007: Hong Kong Rangers

Senior career*
| Years | Team | Apps | (Gls) |
| 2007–2008 | Hong Kong Rangers | 4 | (0) |
| 2008–2009 | Fourway | 16 | (1) |
| 2009–2013 | Tai Po | 65 | (12) |
| 2013–2015 | Kitchee | 3 | (0) |
| 2015–2016 | Wong Tai Sin | 10 | (0) |
| 2016–2017 | Double Flower | 24 | (6) |
| 2017–2018 | Tung Sing | 10 | (0) |
| 2018 | Double Flower | 30 | (16) |
| 2019 | South China | 0 | (0) |
| 2019–2021 | Eastern District | 9 | (8) |
| 2022 | Hawick Royal Albert | | |

International career^{‡}
| 2008–2011 | Hong Kong U-23 | 9 | (3) |
- * Club domestic league appearances and goals as of 30 January 2019 ‡ National team caps and goals as of 3 May 2013

To Hon To (Chinese: 杜瀚滔; Jyutping: dou^{6} hon^{6} dou^{1}, born 4 April 1989) is a former Hong Kong professional footballer who played as a forward.

== Club career ==
To is the top scorer of the reserve league in the 2007–2008 season which he scored 18 goals in 21 games.

== International career ==
To was a member of the Hong Kong national under-23 football team for the 2012 London Olympics qualifiers. He scored two goals against Maldives on 23 February 2011 to help Hong Kong secure a 4:0 victory.

== Honours ==
=== Club ===
Tai Po

- Hong Kong Senior Shield (1): 2012–13

Kitchee

- Hong Kong First Division (1): 2013–14
- Hong Kong Premier League (1): 2014–15

=== International ===
Hong Kong U-23

- Hong Kong–Macau Interport (2): 2008, 2009

=== Individual ===
- Hong Kong Top Footballer Awards Best Youth Player (1): 2010–11

== Career statistics ==
=== Club ===
As of 22 February 2015

| Club performance | | | League | | Cup | | League Cup | | Continental | | Total | |
| Season | Club | League | Apps | Goals | Apps | Goals | Apps | Goals | Apps | Goals | Apps | Goals |
| Hong Kong | | | League | | FA Cup & Shield | | LC & Play-off | | Asia | | Total | |
|---|---|---|---|---|---|---|---|---|---|---|---|---|
| 2006–07 | Rangers (HKG) | First Division | 0 | 0 | 0 | 0 | 1 | 0 | - | | 1 | 0 |
| 2007–08 | Rangers (HKG) | First Division | 4 | 0 | 0 | 0 | 0 | 0 | - | | 4 | 0 |
| 2008–09 | Fourway | First Division | 16 | 1 | 4 | 0 | 2 | 0 | - | | 22 | 1 |
| 2009–10 | Tai Po | First Division | 16 | 3 | 6 | 0 | - | | 5 | 0 | 27 | 3 |
| 2010–11 | Tai Po | First Division | 17 | 5 | 6 | 0 | 1 | 1 | - | | 24 | 6 |
| 2011–12 | Tai Po | First Division | 14 | 2 | 3 | 1 | 1 | 0 | - | | 18 | 3 |
| 2012–13 | Tai Po | First Division | 18 | 2 | 13 | 2 | 1 | 0 | - | | 32 | 4 |
| 2013–14 | Kitchee | First Division | 2 | 0 | 1 | 0 | 0 | 0 | 5 | 0 | 8 | 0 |
| 2014–15 | Kitchee | Premier League | 0 | 0 | 0 | 0 | 0 | 0 | 1 | 0 | 1 | 0 |
| Total | Hong Kong | | 87 | 13 | 33 | 3 | 6 | 1 | 11 | 0 | 137 | 17 |
| Career total | | | 87 | 13 | 33 | 3 | 6 | 1 | 11 | 0 | 137 | 17 |

=== International ===
As of 23 June 2010

Hong Kong U23 appearances and goals
| # | Date | Venue | Opponent | Result | Scored | Competition |
2007–08
| 1 | 15 June 2008 | Estádio Campo Desportivo, Macau | Macau | 1–0 | 0 | 2008 Hong Kong–Macau Interport |
2008–09
| 2 | 20 June 2009 | Mong Kok Stadium, Hong Kong | Macau | 5–1 | 1 | 2009 Hong Kong–Macau Interport |
2010–11
| 3 | 24 January 2010 | So Kon Po Recreation Ground, Hong Kong | Chinese Taipei | 4–0 | 0 | Friendly |
| 4 | 26 January 2010 | Sai Tso Wan Recreation Ground, Hong Kong | Chinese Taipei | 1–0 | 0 | Friendly |
| 5 | 9 February 2011 | Po Kong Village Park, Hong Kong | Indonesia | 1–4 | 0 | Friendly |
| 6 | 23 February 2011 | Hong Kong Stadium, Hong Kong | Maldives | 4–0 | 2 | 2012 AFC Men's Pre-Olympic Tournament |
| 7 | 12 June 2010 | Xianghe Sports Center, Beijing | United Arab Emirates | 0–2 | 0 | Friendly |
| 8 | 19 June 2011 | JAR Stadium, Tashkent, Uzbekistan | Uzbekistan | 0–1 | 0 | 2012 AFC Men's Pre-Olympic Tournament |
| 9 | 23 June 2011 | Hong Kong Stadium, Hong Kong | Uzbekistan | 0–2 | 0 | 2012 AFC Men's Pre-Olympic Tournament |

Awards
| Preceded by Yapp Hung Fai; Kwok Kin Pong | Hong Kong Top Footballer Awards Best Youth Player; 2010–11 with James Ha | Succeeded by Lau Cheuk Hin; Lam Hok Hei |
