= Jang Kyung-jin =

South Korean footballer (born 1983)

Jang Kyung-Jin
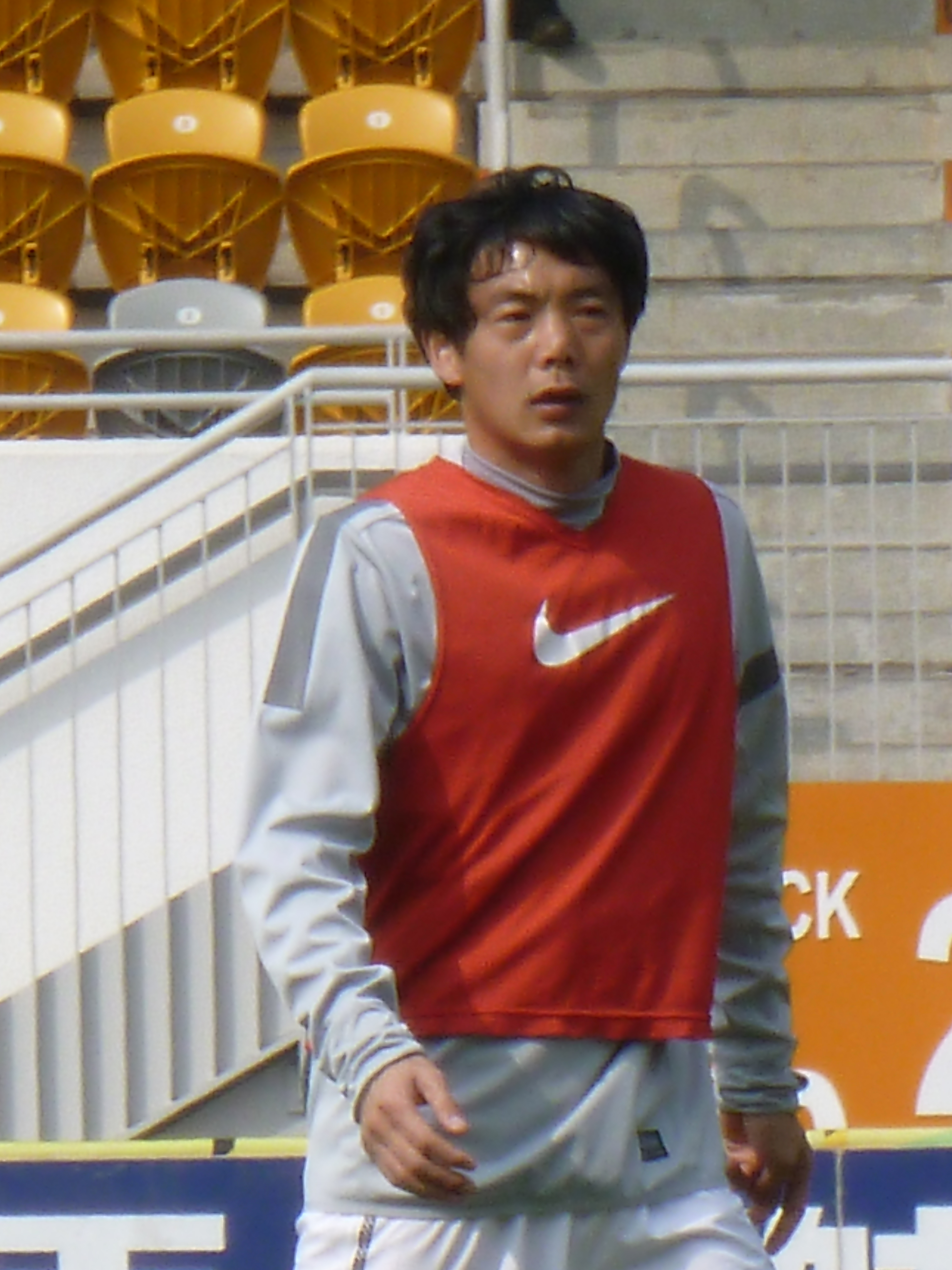

Personal information
- Date of birth: 31 August 1983 (age 43)
- Place of birth: Jindo, Jeonnam, South Korea
- Height: 1.86 m (6 ft 1 in)
- Position: Defender

Team information
- Current team: Ulsan Hyundai Mipo Dolphin FC
- Number: 13

Senior career*
| Years | Team | Apps | (Gls) |
| 2002–2004 | Chunnam Dragons | 0 | (0) |
| 2005–2011 | Incheon United | 64 | (4) |
| 2008–2009 | → Gwangju Sangmu (army) | 19 | (0) |
| 2010 | → Oita Trinita (loan) | 15 | (0) |
| 2012 | Gwangju FC | 6 | (0) |
| 2013 | Ulsan Hyundai Mipo | 21 | (0) |
| 2014 | Kitchee | 12 | (0) |
| 2015– | Ulsan Hyundai Mipo Dolphin FC | 0 | (0) |

International career
| 2002–2003 | South Korea U-20 | 11 | (1) |
- * Club domestic league appearances and goals as of 17:39, 22 May 2014 (UTC)

Jang Kyung-Jin (Korean: 장경진; born 31 August 1983) is a South Korean football defender who last played for Hong Kong First Division League side Kitchee. His previous clubs were Ulsan Hyundai Mipo, Chunnam Dragons, Gwangju Sangmu Phoenix, Incheon United, Gwangju FC and Oita Trinita in Japan.

== Club statistics ==
As of 5 January 2012

| Club performance | | | League | | Cup | | League Cup | | Total | |
| Season7 | Club | League | Apps | Goals | Apps | Goals | Apps | Goals | Apps | Goals |
| Korea Republic | | | League | | FA Cup | | K-League Cup | | Total | |
|---|---|---|---|---|---|---|---|---|---|---|
| 2002 | Chunnam Dragons | K-League | 0 | 0 | | | 0 | 0 | 0 | 0 |
| 2003 | Chunnam Dragons | K-League | 0 | 0 | 1 | 0 | - | | 1 | 0 |
| 2004 | Chunnam Dragons | K-League | 0 | 0 | 0 | 0 | 2 | 0 | 2 | 0 |
| 2005 | Incheon United | K-League | 14 | 1 | 1 | 0 | 0 | 0 | 15 | 0 |
| 2006 | Incheon United | K-League | 16 | 0 | 2 | 0 | 11 | 0 | 29 | 0 |
| 2007 | Incheon United | K-League | 22 | 3 | 3 | 0 | 7 | 0 | 32 | 3 |
| 2008 | Gwangju Sangmu | K-League | 10 | 0 | 0 | 0 | 2 | 0 | 12 | 0 |
| 2009 | Gwangju Sangmu | K-League | 9 | 0 | 2 | 0 | 4 | 0 | 15 | 0 |
| Japan | | | League | | Emperor's Cup | | J.League Cup | | Total | |
| 2010 | Oita Trinita | J2 League | 15 | 0 | 1 | 0 | - | | 16 | 0 |
| Korea Republic | | | League | | FA Cup | | K-League Cup | | Total | |
| 2011 | Incheon United | K-League | 11 | 0 | 1 | 0 | 2 | 0 | 14 | 0 |
| 2012 | Gwangju FC | K-League | 6 | 0 | 0 | 0 | 0 | 0 | 6 | 0 |
| Country | Korea Republic | | 88 | 4 | 10 | 0 | 28 | 0 | 126 | 4 |
| Country | Japan | | 15 | 0 | 1 | 0 | - | | 16 | 0 |
| Total | | | 103 | 4 | 11 | 0 | 28 | 0 | 142 | 4 |
