= Shareef Adnan =

Jordanian footballer (born 1984)

Personal information
- Full name: Shareef Adnan Nassar
- Date of birth: 21 January 1984 (age 42)
- Place of birth: Amman, Jordan
- Height: 1.81 m (5 ft 11 in)
- Positions: Left back; midfielder

Senior career*
Years	Team	Apps	(Gls)
2002–2008	Al-Faisaly		
2008–2010	Shabab Al-Khaleel (loan)		
2010–2014	Al-Faisaly		
2014–2015	Al-Khaleej		
2015	East Riffa		
2015–2016	Al-Faisaly		
2016–2017	Shabab Al-Ordon		

International career
2009	Palestine	3	(0)
2011–2015	Jordan	16	(0)
- * Club domestic league appearances and goals

Shareef Adnan Nassar (Arabic: شريف عدنان نصار; born 21 January 1984) is a Jordanian retired footballer who played for Jordan national football team.

== Honors and Participation in International tournaments ==
=== Pan Arab Games ===
- 2011 Pan Arab Games

=== WAFF Championships ===
- 2014 WAFF Championship
