= Diego Cascón =

Spanish footballer

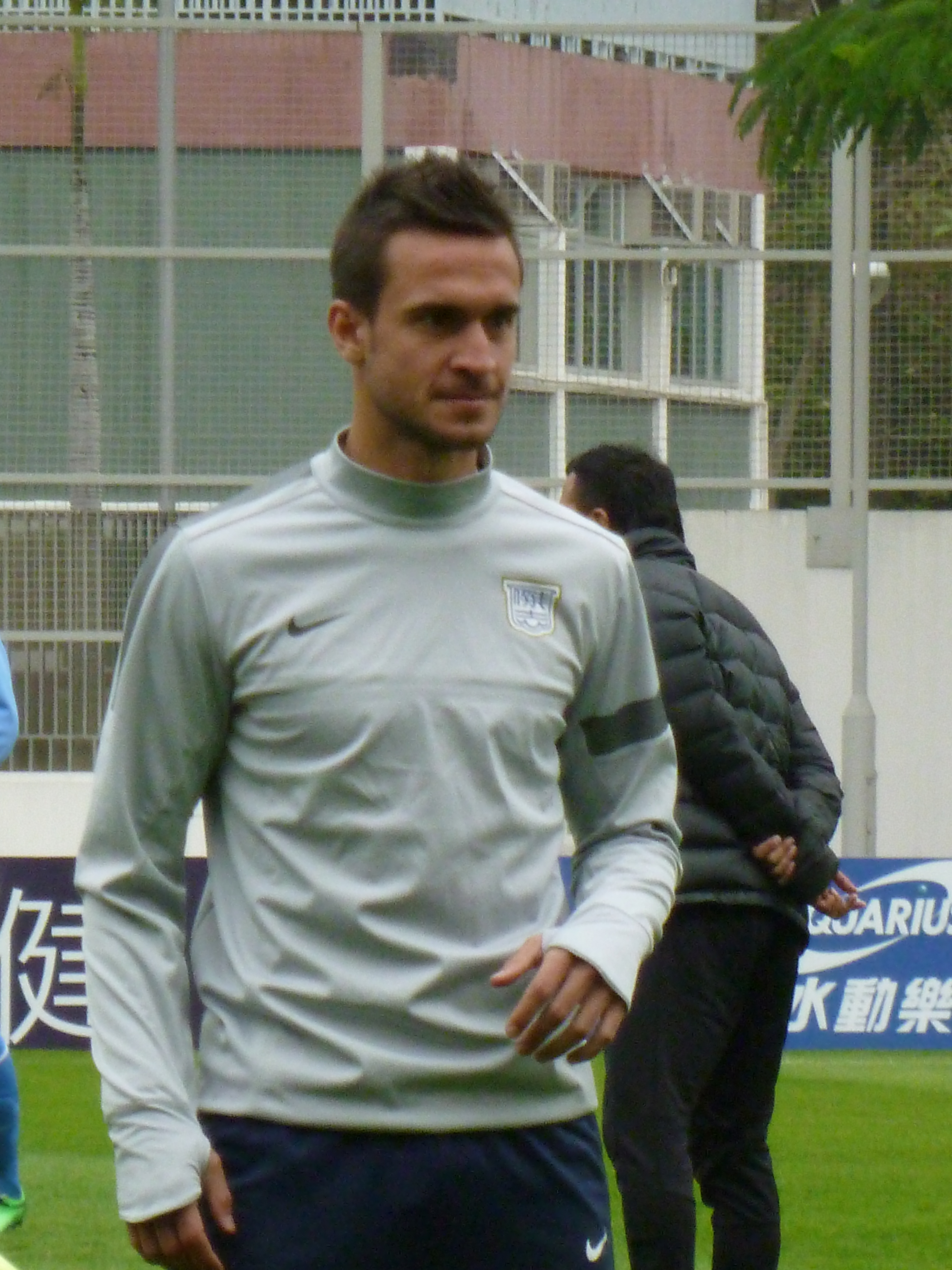
- Cascón training with Kitchee

Personal information
- Full name: Diego Cascón Sandoval
- Date of birth: 7 June 1984 (age 42)
- Place of birth: León, Spain
- Height: 1.84 m (6 ft 1/2 in)
- Position: Forward

Youth career
- Cultural Leonesa

Senior career*
Years	Team	Apps	(Gls)
2002–2005	Cultural Leonesa B		
2003–2007	Cultural Leonesa	80	(18)
2007–2008	Badalona	35	(0)
2008–2009	Poli Ejido	29	(5)
2009–2010	Alcorcón	32	(8)
2010–2011	Eibar	23	(4)
2011–2014	Jaén	72	(20)
2014	Kitchee	9	(5)
2014–2015	América Cali	10	(0)
2015–2016	Melilla	39	(10)
2017	Mérida	16	(2)
2017–2018	Ibiza	19	(4)
Total		364+	(76+)
- * Club domestic league appearances and goals

Diego Cascón Sandoval (born 7 June 1984) is a Spanish former professional footballer who played as a forward.

== Club career ==
Cascón was born in León, Castile and León. He spent his first 11 seasons as a senior in the Segunda División B, amassing totals of 260 games and 55 goals for Cultural y Deportiva Leonesa, CF Badalona, Polideportivo Ejido, AD Alcorcón – with these two teams, he eliminated Villarreal CF and Real Madrid respectively from the Copa del Rey– SD Eibar and Real Jaén.

Whilst with the latter club, Cascón solicited the services of a sorcerer in April 2013 in an attempt to end a negative scoring drought, feeling he was a victim of the evil eye. He eventually scored eight goals in 31 matches, as the Andalusia side promoted and returned to Segunda División after 11 years.

Cascón made his professional debut on 18 August 2013 at the age of 29, in Jaén's 1–2 home defeat against SD Eibar in the second-division opener. In February 2014, after only a further ten league appearances and no goals, he moved abroad for the first time, joining a host of compatriots at Kitchee SC in Hong Kong.

On 15 August 2017, Cascón moved to Tercera División club UD Ibiza following stints with Mérida AD and UD Melilla in the tier above.

== Career statistics ==
Club	Season	League			Cup		Other		Total	
Club	Season	Division	Apps	Goals	Apps	Goals	Apps	Goals	Apps	Goals
Cultural Leonesa	2002–03	Segunda División B	1	0	0	0	—		1	0
Cultural Leonesa	2003–04	Segunda División B	4	0	0	0	1 (Note: Appearances in Segunda División B play-offs)	0	5	0
Cultural Leonesa	2004–05	Segunda División B	12	0	0	0	—		12	0
Cultural Leonesa	2005–06	Segunda División B	27	6	0	0	—		27	6
Cultural Leonesa	2006–07	Segunda División B	36	12	0	0	—		36	12
Cultural Leonesa	Total		80	18	0	0	1	0	81	18
Badalona	2007–08	Segunda División B	35	0	2	1	—		37	1
Poli Ejido	2008–09	Segunda División B	29	5	5	0	1	0	35	5
Alcorcón	2009–10	Segunda División B	32	8	5	1	6	1	43	10
Eibar	2010–11	Segunda División B	23	4	0	0	2	0	25	4
Jaén	2011–12	Segunda División B	30	12	2	1	2	0	34	13
Jaén	2012–13	Segunda División B	31	8	4	0	2	0	37	8
Jaén	2013–14	Segunda División	11	0	0	0	—		11	0
Jaén	Total		72	20	6	1	4	0	82	21
Kitchee	2013–14	Hong Kong First Division	9	5	3	0	—		12	5
América Cali	2014	Categoría Primera B	10	0	4	0	—		14	0
Melilla	2015–16	Segunda División B	32	9	1	0	—		33	9
Melilla	2016–17	Segunda División B	7	1	0	0	—		7	1
Melilla	Total		39	10	1	0	—		40	10
Mérida	2016–17	Segunda División B	16	2	0	0	—		16	2
Ibiza	2017–18	Tercera División	19	4	0	0	—		19	4
Career total			364	76	26	3	14	1	404	80
