= Liang Yuhao =

Hong Kong footballer

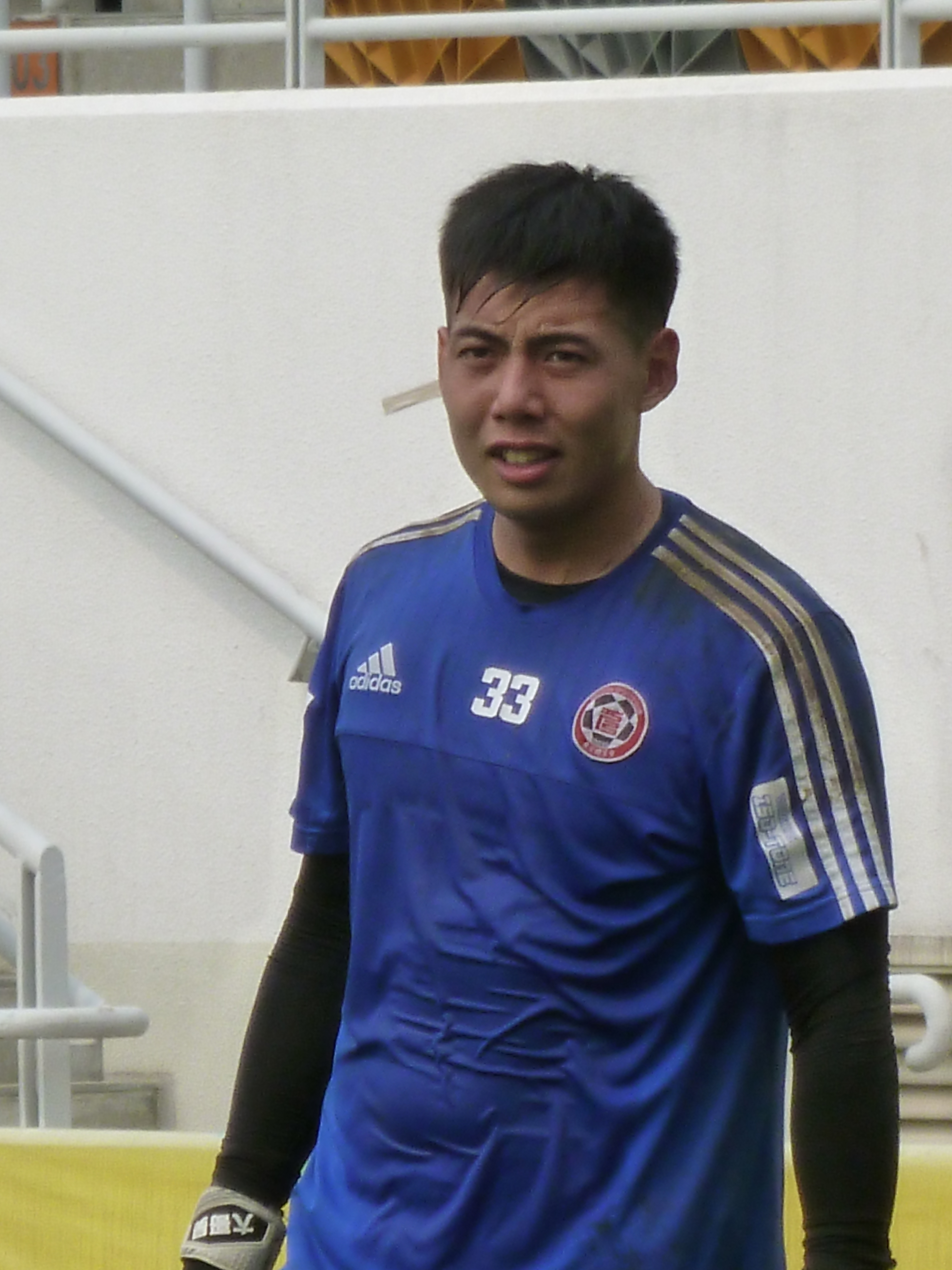

Personal information
- Full name: Liang Yuhao
- Date of birth: 3 March 1993 (age 33)
- Place of birth: Shaoguan, Guangdong, China
- Height: 1.85 m (6 ft 1 in)
- Position: Goalkeeper

Youth career
- Shaoguan Xingchen
- 2010–2011: Panyu Mingzhu
- 2011–2012: Tai Po

Senior career*
| Years | Team | Apps | (Gls) |
| 2012–2013 | Wanchai | 14 | (0) |
| 2012 | → South China (loan) | 0 | (0) |
| 2013–2015 | Tai Po | 25 | (0) |
| 2015–2019 | Eastern | 1 | (0) |
| 2021–2022 | Haimen Codion | | |
| 2023–2025 | Guangdong Wuchuan | | |
| 2025–2026 | Shenzhen Boss United | | |
| 2026– | Fu Moon | 5 | (0) |

International career
| 2015 | Hong Kong U23 | 3 | (0) |
- * Club domestic league appearances and goals as of 16 May 2026

Liang Yuhao (Chinese: 梁宇昊, born 3 March 1993) is a former professional football player who played as a goalkeeper. Born in China, he represented Hong Kong internationally.

== Club career ==
In 2011, Liang came from Guangdong to Hong Kong, had training with Hong Kong First Division League club Tai Po, but he couldn't get into the first team during that season.

In 2012, Liang signed for Hong Kong Second Division League club Wanchai.

In 2012, Liang was loaning to Hong Kong First Division League club South China.

In 2013, Liang returned to Hong Kong Second Division League club Tai Po, and helped them to promoted to Hong Kong Premier League in 2014.

In 2015, Liang signed for Hong Kong Premier League club Eastern.

On 7 May 2016, Liang made his HKPL debut for Eastern against Kitchee, which the match lost 0–2.

In 2019, Liang played 2 consecutive matches for Eastern as the first-choice goalkeeper and he managed to keep a clean sheet against Dreams FC in Sapling Cup.

In July 2019, Liang was released by Eastern.

== International career ==
After 4 years staying in Hong Kong, Liang became a local player, he could represent Hong Kong national football team.

On 27 March 2015, in 2016 AFC U-23 Championship qualification Group F, Liang made his debut for Hong Kong U-23 in a match against Australia U-23, which Hong Kong lost 0–6.

== Honours ==
=== Club ===
Eastern

- Hong Kong Premier League: 2015–16
- Hong Kong Senior Shield: 2015–16
