= Cheng King Ho =

Hong Kong footballer

Cheng King Ho 鄭璟昊
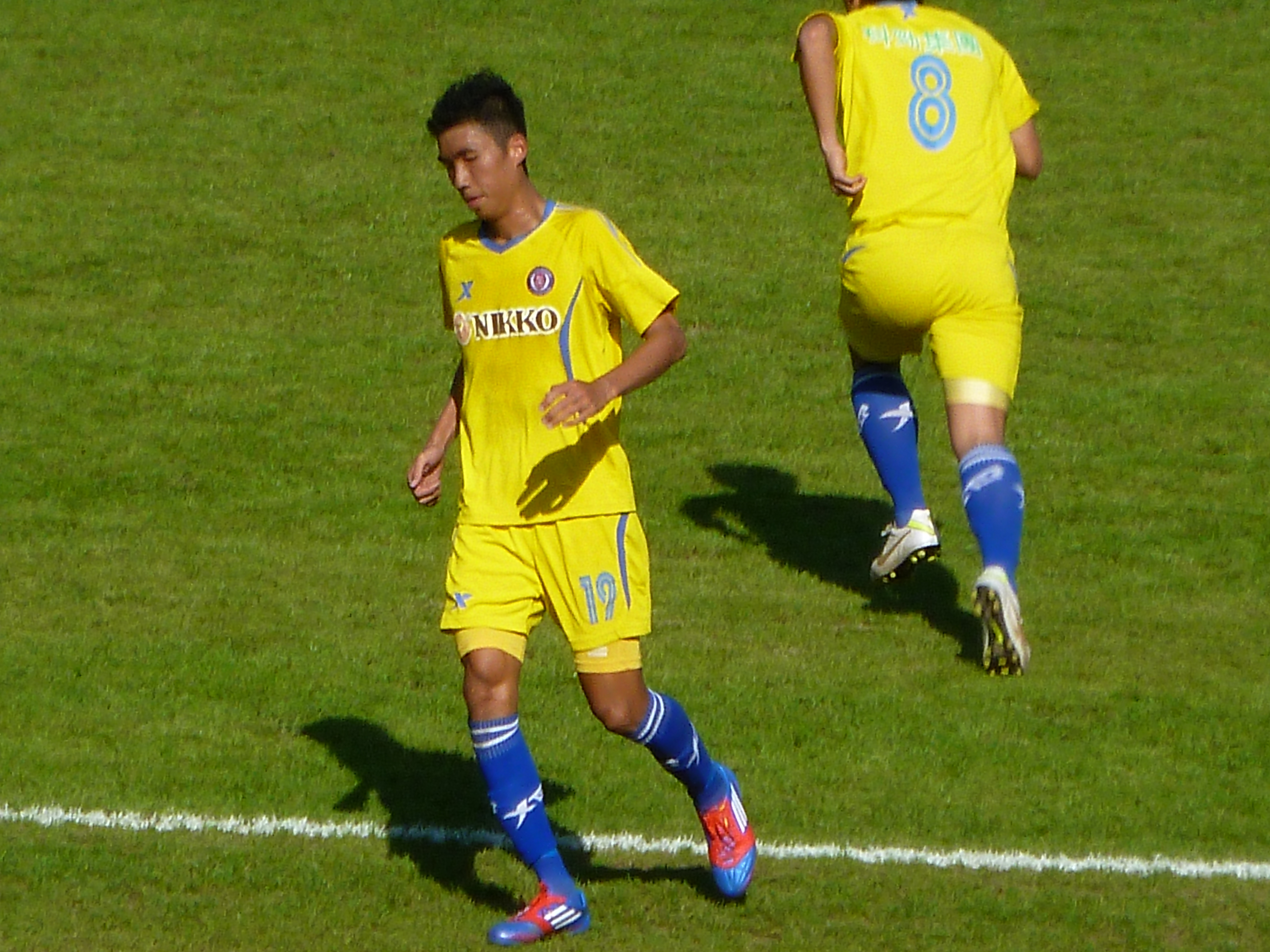

Personal information
- Full name: Cheng King Ho
- Date of birth: 7 November 1989 (age 37)
- Place of birth: Hong Kong
- Height: 1.76 m (5 ft 9 in)
- Position: Wing back

Youth career
- 2006–2008: South China

Senior career*
Years	Team	Apps	(Gls)
2008–2009	South China	0	(0)
2008–2009	→ Pegasus (loan)	6	(0)
2009–2013	Kitchee	0	(0)
2009–2011	→ Tai Chung (loan)	35	(3)
2012–2013	→ Hong Kong Rangers (loan)	17	(1)
2013–2015	Yuen Long	33	(1)
2015–2021	Eastern	41	(0)
2019–2020	→ Yuen Long (loan)	5	(0)
2020–2021	→ Resources Capital (loan)	15	(1)
2021–2024	Resources Capital	36	(0)
2024–	Yuen Long	43	(5)

International career
2008–2011	Hong Kong U-23	10	(0)
2015–2018	Hong Kong	12	(0)
- * Club domestic league appearances and goals as of 16 May 2026

Cheng King Ho (Chinese: 鄭璟昊; Cantonese Yale: Jehng Gínghouh, born 7 November 1989) is a former Hong Kong professional footballer who played as a wing back.

== International career ==
On 28 March 2015, Cheng made his international debut for Hong Kong in a friendly match against Guam.

== Career statistics ==
=== International ===
==== Hong Kong ====
As of 11 October 2018

National team	Year	Apps	Goals
Hong Kong	2015	5	0
Hong Kong	2016	6	0
Hong Kong	2017	0	0
Hong Kong	2018	1	0
Total		12	0

== Honours ==
=== Club ===
Eastern

- Hong Kong Premier League: 2015–16
- Hong Kong Senior Shield: 2015–16
