= Tsang Kam To =

Hong Kong footballer (born 1989)

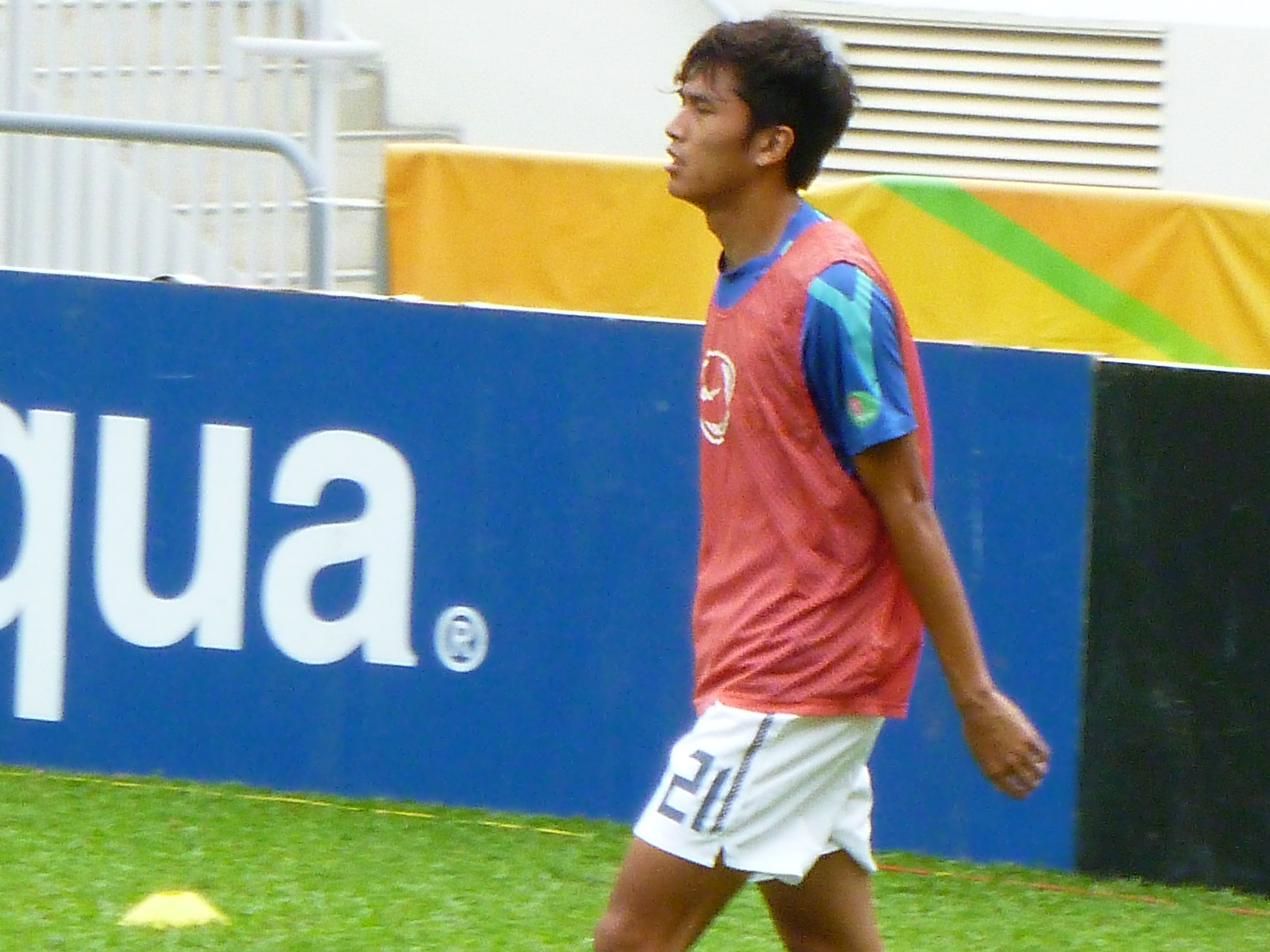
- Tsang playing for Kitchee in 2012

Personal information
- Full name: Tsang Kam To
- Date of birth: 21 June 1989 (age 37)
- Place of birth: Hong Kong
- Height: 1.77 m (5 ft 10 in)
- Position: Right back

Team information
- Current team: Kowloon City
- Number: 21

Youth career
- 2005–2006: Hong Kong 09

Senior career*
Years	Team	Apps	(Gls)
2006–2007	Hong Kong 08	13	(1)
2007–2008	Workable	17	(0)
2008–2015	Kitchee	55	(4)
2015–2020	Eastern	56	(0)
2020–2023	Lee Man	24	(0)
2023–	Kowloon City	55	(0)

International career^{‡}
2009–2011	Hong Kong U23	10	(0)
2011–2021	Hong Kong	6	(0)

Managerial career
- 2025–: Kowloon City (assistant coach)
Medal record
Representing Hong Kong
East Asian Games
Gold medal – first place	2009 Hong Kong	Football
- * Club domestic league appearances and goals as of 30 October 2026 ‡ National team caps and goals as of 15 June 2021

Tsang Kam To
- Traditional Chinese: 曾錦濤
- Simplified Chinese: 曾锦涛
Transcriptions
Standard Mandarin
- Hanyu Pinyin: Zēng Jǐntāo
Yue: Cantonese
- Jyutping: zang^{1} gam^{2} tou^{4}

Tsang Kam To (Chinese: 曾錦濤; born 21 June 1989) is a Hong Kong professional footballer who currently plays as a full back for Hong Kong Premier League club Kowloon City. He is also the assistant coach of the club.

Tsang has represented Hong Kong in international competitions since childhood. In 2009, he won a gold medal at the East Asian Games as a member of the Hong Kong national under-23 football team.

Known for his versatility, Tsang played as forward when he played for Hong Kong 08. He is adept at different position including wingback and winger. For the Hong Kong under-23 football team, he occasionally plays at centre-back.

== Early life ==
Tsang was born in Hong Kong, and went to St.Patrick's Catholic Primary School in Wang Tau Hom. He has started playing football in there in his third year. He showed his talent on the school team, and he captained it in his fifth and sixth years in school.

During his last year in primary school he was selected by Hong Kong Football Association to train with the Hong Kong under-14 team. He had his secondary education in POH Chan Kai Memorial College, Sha Tin.

== Club career ==
=== Early career ===
Because of his early international career, Tsang was a member of the long-term training section for 2009 East Asian Games. The Football Association signed him for the newly founded Hong Kong First Division League club "Hong Kong 08" with other members of training section for the 2008 Olympic Games because of his good performance in Hong Kong 09. In his early years, he mostly played as a striker. In the league match against Lanwa Redbull on 17 September 2006, the second league match of Tsang's senior career, he scored his first league goal in the 18th minute. He played 18 matches and had 2 goals in 2006–07 season.

After 2008 Summer Olympics qualification, Hong Kong 08 had been dissolved. Another new first division team Workable contracted former Olympics team members including Tsang. In Workable, for his high-speed, coach Lee Kin Wo has changed his position from striker to wingback. He was the regular player of the team and he played 21 matches in 2007–08 season.

=== Kitchee ===
Tsang's performance impressed the football world of Hong Kong and he agreed a deal to sign for Kitchee in the summer of 2008. He scored his first goal for Kitchee in his first appearance of the team in a league match against Xiangxue Eisiti on 28 February 2009. He was mainly used as a substitute in the 2008–09 season since captain Leung Chi Wing, Canadian Landon Ling and Cameroonian Hugues Nanmi occupied the wingback positions of two sides. In the following season, all three wingbacks left the club but Josep Gombau, the new coach, selected centre-back Li Hang Wui for the position, leaving Tsang as a substitute for most matches.

In the summer in 2010, Kitchee planned to loan Tsang to Tai Chung, giving him more chances to play football. However, Tsang performed wonderfully in pre-season friendly matches and manager Ken Ng cancelled the plan. During the 2010–11 season, Tsang still mostly acted as a substitute of his teammates but he was also used in the 2011 Canon Cup match against Villarreal.

Because Kitchee had won the 2010–11 Hong Kong First Division League, Tsang had had a chance to participate in the 2011 Barclays Asia Trophy. He started in both the semi-final match against Chelsea and third place play-off against Blackburn Rovers. In the third place play-off, Tsang was fouled by Martin Olsson in the penalty box and a penalty kick was awarded, though Ubay Luzardo missed the penalty. Kitchee got the wooden spoon.

On 23 October 2011, Tsang came off the substitutes bench as a winger in the 73rd minute to assist a crucial equaliser against TSW Pegasus in the 83rd minute and score inside the penalty area in the 86th minute, defeating TSW Pegasus by 3–2. Tsang claim his sense of striker still strongly exist and he want to prove that Hong Kong footballers can feel up to be a shooter in the team. Tsang always have training for shoot frequently to convince Josep Gombau to select him as a forward.

Tsang had more opportunities to play in the field later. He played the Hong Kong derby winning by two goals with Kitchee in 2011–12 Hong Kong FA Cup. He also played four 2012 AFC Cup group stage matches against Terengganu, Sông Lam Nghệ An and Tampines Rovers and Kitchee finally won the first place in the stage. In the final fixture of the league, Kitchee beat Biu Chun Rangers by 4–1 and Tsang scored in the 11th minute.

Although Kitchee won the 2011–12 Hong Kong League Cup and 2011–12 Hong Kong First Division League, the team was eliminated by Arema in 2012 AFC Cup round of 16. In the round of 16, Tsang came off the bench at half-time but he did not make any score or assist.

In 2012–13 season, Tsang still was a substitute player for Kitchee in local competitions. Pleasantly, he scored in the league game against Southern District on 13 September 2012. Kitchee won the FA Cup, first edition season play-off and First Division League again this season. By the way, Tsang played most of Kitchee's 2013 AFC Cup matches, against Semen Padang, Churchill Brothers and Warriors in group stage and Kelantan and Al-Faisaly in knockout stage. In the AFC Cup home match against Warriors, Tsang scored the fourth goal and Kitchee won by five.

=== Eastern ===
Tsang joined Eastern in 2015 and left 5 years later on 1 June 2020 after the expiration of his contract.

=== Lee Man ===
On 2 June 2020, Lee Man announced the signing of Tsang.

=== Kowloon City ===
In July 2023, Tsang joined Kowloon City.

== International career ==
Tsang has earned caps with all of Hong Kong's youth and senior teams for which he was eligible. Hong Kong Football Association have decided to play Tsang in an age group above his age, so he was selected by the Hong Kong national under-14 football team in his last primary school year. The association had planned him as a player of 2009 East Asian Games team originally and he was contracted to Hong Kong 08 later, formed for training youngsters for 2008 AFC Pre-Olympic Tournament.

Tsang did not play in any matches of the 2008 Pre-Olympic Tournament in 2007; the coach preferred strikers with greater strength. He left the summer training section of 2009 East Asian Games team in Croatia for personal reasons, and therefore Philip Lee, general director of EAG team, criticised five absentees so conceited.

One year later, Goran Paulić took up the head coach of EAG team, and he recalled Tsang because South China and TSW Pegasus boycotted Paulić. Tsang earned his first cap of under-23 football team as a defender in 2009 Hong Kong–Macau Interport on 20 June 2009, and he was age of 19.

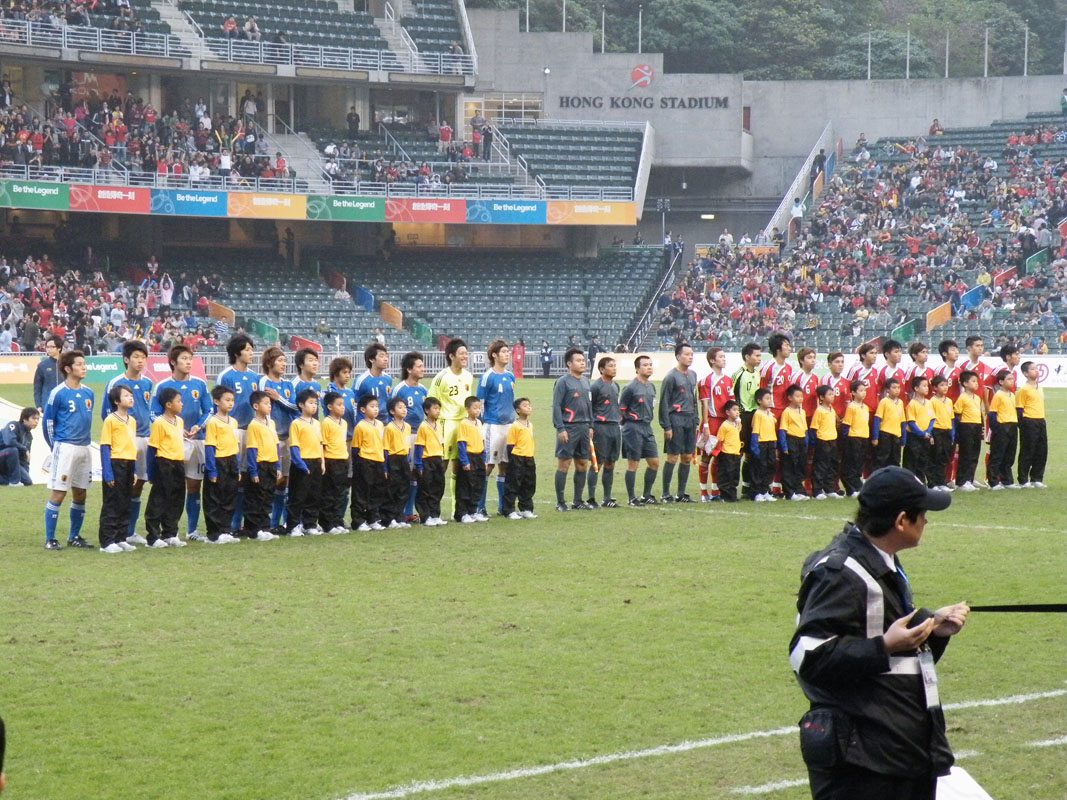
Tsang (No.21) played the final of the football tournament of the 2009 Esat Asian Games

Tsang was selected for the 2009 East Asian Games, but he did not play in the group stage matches and semi-final match, since Lau Nim Yat was the first choice of the right back position. Due to the injury of Lau, Tsang was able to play in the final of the tournament against Japan on 12 December 2009 as the starter of the right back position, and Hong Kong defeated Japan at penalty shootout finally.

In 2010 Asian Games, Tsang was the regular start-up player of the Hong Kong team and played all four games. Although Hong Kong was knocked out in the quarter-final, head coach Tsang Wai Chung paid tribute to Tsang for his bravery. In February 2011, Tsang was selected for the senior team by Tsang Wai Chung for a friendly against Malaysia in Kuala Lumpur. He earned his first senior cap but Hong Kong lost by two goals.

After two major under-23 events, Tsang became a leader of the 2012 Pre-Olympic team. Because of a shortage of centre backs, Tsang was selected at centre-back in the Pre-Olympic team. He played both the first round against Maldives and the second against Uzbekistan at the 2012 AFC Pre-Olympic Tournament and Hong Kong were eliminated in a 3–0 defeat to Uzbekistan.

On 9 February 2011, Tsang made his international debut for Hong Kong in a friendly match against Malaysia.

== Honours ==
Kitchee

- Hong Kong Premier League: 2014–15
- Hong Kong First Division League: 2010–11, 2011–12, 2013–14
- Hong Kong FA Cup: 2011–12, 2012–13, 2014–15
- Hong Kong League Cup: 2011–12, 2014–15
- Hong Kong season play-offs: 2012–13

Eastern

- Hong Kong Premier League: 2015–16
- Hong Kong Senior Shield: 2015–16

Hong Kong U-23

- East Asian Games: 2009
- Hong Kong–Macau Interport: 2009
- Hong Kong Sports Stars Award for Team Only Sport: 2009

== Career statistics ==
=== Club ===
As of 27 September 2015

Club performance			League		Cup		League Cup		Continental		Total	
Season	Club	League	Apps	Goals	Apps	Goals	Apps	Goals	Apps	Goals	Apps	Goals
Hong Kong			League		FA Cup & Shield		LC & Play-offs		Asia		Total	
2006–07	Hong Kong 08	Hong Kong First Division League	13	1	2	1	3	0	–		18	2
2007–08	Workable	Hong Kong First Division League	17	0	1	0	3	0	–		21	0
2008–09	Kitchee	Hong Kong First Division League	5	1	0	0	1	0	–		6	1
2009–10	Kitchee	Hong Kong First Division League	12	0	3	0	–		–		15	0
2010–11	Kitchee	Hong Kong First Division League	11	0	2	0	0	0	–		13	0
2011–12	Kitchee	Hong Kong First Division League	8	2	4	0	2	0	5	0	19	2
2012–13	Kitchee	Hong Kong First Division League	10	1	1	0	1	0	4	1	16	2
2013–14	Kitchee	Hong Kong First Division League	6	0	1	0	0	0	8	0	15	0
2014–15	Kitchee	Hong Kong Premier League	3	0	2	0	1	0	6	0	12	0
2015–16	Eastern	Hong Kong Premier League	2	0	0	0	0	0	0	0	2	0
Total	Hong Kong		87	5	16	1	11	0	23	1	137	7
Career total			87	5	16	1	11	0	23	1	137	7

=== International ===
==== Hong Kong U-23 ====
As of 20 August 2011

#	Date	Venue	Opponent	Result	Scored	Competition
1	20 June 2009	Mong Kok Stadium, Hong Kong	Macau	5–1	0	2009 Hong Kong–Macau Interport
2	12 December 2009	Hong Kong Stadium, Hong Kong	Japan	1–1 (4–2 PSO)	0	2009 East Asian Games
3	7 November 2010	Huadu Stadium, Guangzhou, China	United Arab Emirates	1–1	0	2010 Asian Games
4	9 November 2010	Huadu Stadium, Guangzhou, China	Uzbekistan	1–0	0	2010 Asian Games
5	11 November 2010	Huadu Stadium, Guangzhou, China	Bangladesh	4–1	0	2010 Asian Games
6	15 November 2010	Huangpu Sports Center, Guangzhou, China	Oman	0–3	0	2010 Asian Games
7	24 January 2011	So Kon Po Recreation Ground, Hong Kong	Chinese Taipei	4–0	0	Friendly
8	23 February 2011	Hong Kong Stadium, Hong Kong	Maldives	4–0	0	2012 AFC Men's Pre-Olympic Tournament
9	9 March 2011	Rasmee Dhandu Stadium, Malé, Maldives	Maldives	3–0	0	2012 AFC Men's Pre-Olympic Tournament
10	12 June 2011	Xianghe Sports Center, Beijing, China	United Arab Emirates	0–2	0	Friendly
11	19 June 2011	JAR Stadium, Tashkent, Uzbekistan	Uzbekistan	0–1	0	2012 AFC Men's Pre-Olympic Tournament
12	23 June 2011	Hong Kong Stadium, Hong Kong	Uzbekistan	0–2	0	2012 AFC Men's Pre-Olympic Tournament

==== Hong Kong ====
As of 15 June 2021

National team	Year	Apps	Goals
Hong Kong	2011	1	0
Hong Kong	2012	0	0
Hong Kong	2013	0	0
Hong Kong	2014	0	0
Hong Kong	2015	0	0
Hong Kong	2016	0	0
Hong Kong	2017	0	0
Hong Kong	2018	4	0
Hong Kong	2019	0	0
Hong Kong	2020	0	0
Hong Kong	2021	1	0
Total		6	0

As of 20 August 2011

#	Date	Venue	Opponent	Result	Scored	Competition
1	9 February 2011	Shah Alam Stadium, Kuala Lumpur, Malaysia	Malaysia	0–2	0	Friendly
