= Hong Kong national football team results (2010–2019) =

- Win Draw Loss

This is a list of the Hong Kong national football team results from 2010 to 2019.

== 2010 ==
6 January 2011 AFC Asian Cup; Qualification Group A	Bahrain	4–0	Hong Kong	Madinat 'Isa, Bahrain
18:00 UTC+3	Abdullatif 35', 40', 44'; Adnan 79'	Report		Stadium: Bahrain National Stadium; Attendance: 1,550; Referee: Abdullah Balideh (Qatar)

7 February 2010 East Asian Championship	South Korea	5–0	Hong Kong	Tokyo, Japan
19:15 UTC+9	Kim Jung-Woo 10'; Gu Ja-Cheol 24'; Lee Dong-Gook 32'; Lee Seung-Ryul 37'; No Byung-Jun 90+3'	Report		Stadium: Olympic Stadium; Attendance: 2,728; Referee: Ryuji Sato (Japan)

11 February 2010 East Asian Championship	Japan	3–0	Hong Kong	Tokyo, Japan
19:15 UTC+9	Tamada 41', 82'; Tulio 65'	Report		Stadium: Olympic Stadium; Attendance: 16,368; Referee: Zhao Liang (China)

14 February 2010 East Asian Championship	Hong Kong	0–2	China	Tokyo, Japan
16:30 UTC+9		Report	Qu Bo 44', 74' (pen.)	Stadium: Olympic Stadium; Attendance: 16,439; Referee: Kim Jong-Hyeok (Korea Republic)

3 March 2011 AFC Asian Cup; Qualification Group A	Hong Kong	0–0	Yemen	So Kon Po, Hong Kong
19:30 UTC+8		Report		Stadium: Hong Kong Stadium; Attendance: 1,212; Referee: Minh Tri Vo (Vietnam)

4 October International Friendly	India	0–1	Hong Kong	Pune, India
18:00 UTC+5:30		Report (Goal.com)	Li Haiqiang 76'	Stadium: Balewadi Stadium; Attendance: 10,000; Referee: Pratap Singh (India)

9 October 2010 Long Teng Cup	Hong Kong	4–2	Philippines	Kaohsiung, Taiwan
17:00 UTC+8	Chan Man Fai 5' (yellow card) 48'; Xu Deshuai 31'; Pak Wing Chak (yellow card) 51'; Tsang Chi Hau (yellow card) 58'; Lo Kwan Yee 84'; Ju Yingzhi 90+1'	Report	P. Younghusband 57' (pen.), 69'	Stadium: Kaohsiung National Stadium; Attendance: 600; Referee: Kao Jung-fang (Chinese Taipei

10 October 2010 Long Teng Cup	Hong Kong	4–0	Macau	Kaohsiung, Taiwan
17:00 UTC+8	Tam Lok Hin 38'; Xu Deshuai 52'; Lam Hok Hei 72', 74' (yellow card) 86'	Report		Stadium: Kaohsiung National Stadium; Attendance: 1,200; Referee: Yu Ming-hsun (Chinese Taipei

12 October 2010 Long Teng Cup	Chinese Taipei	1–1	Hong Kong	Kaohsiung, Taiwan
19:30 UTC+8	Lo Chih An (yellow card) 40'; Lo Chih En 40'; Lin Cheng Yi (yellow card) 64'; Chiang Ming Han (yellow card) 73'	Report	Chak Ting Fung (yellow card) 48'; Lo Kwan Yee 75' (pen.)	Stadium: Kaohsiung National Stadium; Attendance: 3,000; Referee: Kao Tsai-hu (Chinese Taipei

17 November International Friendly	Hong Kong	0–7	Paraguay	So Kon Po, Hong Kong
18:00 UTC+8		Report	Santa Cruz 4', 33'; É. Barreto 31'; Ortigoza 46', 55'; M. Riveros 74'; C. Riveros 90+2'	Stadium: Hong Kong Stadium; Attendance: 6,250

== 2011 ==
9 February International Friendly	Malaysia	2–0	Hong Kong	Kuala Lumpur, Malaysia
20:45 UTC+8	Safiq 44'; Amirul 90+1'	Report		Stadium: Shah Alam Stadium

3 June International Friendly	Hong Kong	1–1	Malaysia	Siu Sai Wan, Hong Kong Island, Hong Kong
20:00 UTC+8	Chan Siu Ki 60'		Abdul Hadi Yahya 66'	Stadium: Siu Sai Wan Sports Ground; Attendance: 586

13 July 2014 FIFA World Cup; Qualification 2nd round 1st leg	Saudi Arabia	3–0	Hong Kong	Dammam, Saudi Arabia
20:45 UTC+3	Al-Shamrani 45+1', 47'; Al-Muwalled 45+3'	Report(FIFA); Report(HKFA)		Stadium: Prince Mohamed bin Fahd Stadium; Attendance: 20,354; Referee: Vladislav Tseylin (Uzbekistan); Assistant referees: Rafael Ilyasov(Uzbekistan); Jakhongir Saidov (Uzbekistan); Fourth official: Vadim Agishev (Uzbekistan)

28 July 2014 FIFA World Cup; Qualification 2nd round 2nd leg	Hong Kong	0–5	Saudi Arabia	Siu Sai Wan, Hong Kong
20:00 UTC+8		Report(FIFA); Report(HKFA)	Fallatah 34'; Noor 71' (pen.); Al-Shamrani 73'; Ai-Sahlawi 79'; Hawsawi 90+3'	Stadium: Siu Sai Wan Sports Ground; Attendance: 1,402; Referee: Võ Minh Trí (Vietnam); Assistant referees: Ngoc Ha Nguyen (Vietnam); Hoang Minh Nguyen (Vietnam); Fourth official: Dinh Dung Phung (Vietnam)

30 September 2011 Long Teng Cup	Hong Kong	3–3	Philippines	Kaohsiung, Taiwan
16:30 UTC+8	Lee Wai Lim 2'; Cheng Lai Hin 22'; Au Yeung Yiu Chung 86'	Report(HKFA)	P. Younghusband 31' (pen.); Caligdong 44', 61'	Stadium: Kaohsiung National Stadium

2 October 2011 Long Teng Cup	Hong Kong	5–1	Macau	Kaohsiung, Taiwan
16:30 UTC+8	Sham Kwok Keung 19', 75'; Chan Siu Ki 42'; Wong Chin Hung 50', 81' (pen.)	Report(HKFA)	Leong Ka Hang 14'	Stadium: Kaohsiung National Stadium

4 October 2011 Long Teng Cup	Chinese Taipei	0–6	Hong Kong	Kaohsiung, Taiwan
19:00 UTC+8		Report(HKFA)	Chan Siu Ki 14'; Kwok Kin Pong 25'; Chan Wai Ho 40'; Lee Hong Lim 42', 68'; Lo Kwan Yee 76'	Stadium: Kaohsiung National Stadium

== 2012 ==
29 February International Friendly	Hong Kong	5–1	Chinese Taipei	Mong Kok, Kowloon, Hong Kong
20:00 UTC+8	Chan Siu Ki 2', 5', 82'; Lee Hong Lim 16'; Lo Kwan Yee (yellow card) 39'; Chan Man Fai 47'; Chan Wai Ho (yellow card) 87'	(Report)	Kuo Yin-hung 45'; Lin Cheng-yi (yellow card) 55'	Stadium: Mong Kok Stadium; Attendance: 5,187

1 June International Friendly	Hong Kong	1–0	Singapore	So Kon Po, Hong Kong Island, Hong Kong
20:00 UTC+8	Lam Ka Wai 36'	(Report)	Mustafić (yellow card) 14'	Stadium: Hong Kong Stadium; Attendance: 4,285

10 June International Friendly	Hong Kong	1–2	Vietnam	Mong Kok, Kowloon, Hong Kong
17:30 UTC+8	Au Yeung Yiu Chung 40'; Lee Chi Ho (yellow card) 49'	Report (HKFA)	Nguyen Van Quyet 71'; Nguyen Trong Hoang 74'; Nguyen Thanh Binh (yellow card) 79'; Nguyen Viet Thang (yellow card) 83'; Tran Chi Cong (yellow card) 86'	Stadium: Mong Kok Stadium; Attendance: 2,983

15 August International Friendly	Singapore	2–0	Hong Kong	Jurong West, Singapore
20:30 UTC+8	Đurić 7', 21'			Stadium: Jurong West Stadium; Attendance: 837

16 October International Friendly	Hong Kong	0–3	Malaysia	Mong Kok, Kowloon, Hong Kong
20:00 UTC+8	Yapp Hung Fai (yellow card) 51'	Report	Kunanlan (yellow card) 20'; Sali (yellow card) 51' (goal) 60'; Faizal (yellow card) 61'; Rahim 82' (yellow card) 90'; Saarani 90+2'	Stadium: Mong Kok Stadium; Attendance: 3,267; Referee: Liu Kwok Man (Hong Kong)

14 November International Friendly	Malaysia	1–1	Hong Kong	Shah Alam, Malaysia
20:45 UTC+8	Rohidan (yellow card) 37'; Sali 58' (yellow card) 78'; Wan Zack (yellow card) 87'	Report	Lee Chi Ho (yellow card) 34' (yellow-red card) 79'; Lam Hok Hei 88'	Stadium: Shah Alam Stadium

1 December 2013 EAFF East Asian Cup; Preliminary round 2	Guam	1–2	Hong Kong	Mong Kok, Hong Kong
14:30 UTC+8	Guerrero (yellow card) 54'; Merfalen 56'; Nicklaw (yellow card) 90'	Report	Chan Siu Ki 2', 17'; Michael Luk (yellow card) 55'; Lee Wai Lim (yellow card) 85'	Stadium: Mong Kok Stadium; Attendance: 3,040; Referee: Kim Dae-yong (Korea Republic); Assistant referees: Anuwat Feenuachang (Thailand), Sumate Saiwaew (Thailand); Fourth official: Mongkolchai Pechsri (Thailand)

3 December 2013 EAFF East Asian Cup; Preliminary round 2	Hong Kong	0–1	Australia	Mong Kok, Hong Kong
20:00 UTC+8	Chu Siu Kei (yellow card) 12'; Chan Siu Ki (yellow card) 52'; Lam Hok Hei (yellow card) 88' (yellow-red card) 90'	Report	Behich (yellow card) 26'; Emerton (yellow card) 52', (goal) 85'	Stadium: Mong Kok Stadium; Attendance: 4,160; Referee: Jumpei Iida (Japan); Assistant referees: Lee Hung Ping (Chinese Taipei), Musi Ala (China PR); Fourth official: Kim Dae-yong (Korea Republic)

7 December 2013 EAFF East Asian Cup; Preliminary round 2	Hong Kong	2–0	Chinese Taipei	So Kon Po, Hong Kong
20:30 UTC+8	Chan Wai Ho 24'; Lee Hong Lim 25'; Cheng Siu Wai (yellow card) 72'	Report	Yang Chao-hsun (yellow card) 23'; Lin Cheng-yi (yellow card) 47'	Stadium: Hong Kong Stadium; Attendance: 2,315; Referee: Jumpei Iida (Japan); Assistant referees: Musi Ala (China PR), Anuwat Feenuachang (Thailand); Fourth official: Kim Dae-yong (Korea Republic)

9 December 2013 EAFF East Asian Cup; Preliminary round 2	Hong Kong	0–4	North Korea	So Kon Po, Hong Kong
14:20 UTC+8	Chan Siu Ki (yellow card) 68'; Lee Chi Ho (yellow card) 74'; Michael Luk (yellow card) 90'	Report	Pak Nam-chol II 27'; Ryang Yong-gi 33'; Pak Nam-chol I 36'; Jong Il-gwan (yellow card) 80'; Pak Song-chol 85'	Stadium: Hong Kong Stadium; Attendance: 3,345; Referee: Yao Qing (China); Assistant referees: Lee Hung Ping (Chinese Taipei), Sumate Saiwaew (Thailand); Fourth official: Wang Zhe (China)

== 2013 ==
6 February 2015 AFC Asian Cup; Qualification Group E	Uzbekistan	0–0	Hong Kong	Tashkent, Uzbekistan
16:00 UTC+5		Report	Lo Kwan Yee (red card) 58'; Yapp Hung Fai (yellow card) 60'; Bai He (yellow card) 90+1'	Stadium: Pakhtakor Stadium; Attendance: 16,287; Referee: Ali Abdulnabi (Bahrain); Assistant referees: Yaser Khalil Ebrahim Abdulla Tulefat (Bahrain), Ebrahim Moosa Saleh (Bahrain); Fourth official: Jameel Juma Abdulhusain Mohamed (Bahrain)

22 March 2015 AFC Asian Cup; Qualification Group E	Hong Kong	1–0	Vietnam	Mong Kok, Hong Kong
20:00 UTC+8	Bai He (yellow card) 78'; Lee Chi Ho (yellow card) 84'; Chan Wai Ho 87'	Report (AFC); Report (HKFA)	Le Tan Tai (yellow card) 34'; Michal Nguyen (yellow card) 49'	Stadium: Mong Kok Stadium; Attendance: 6,639; Referee: Abdulrahman Abdou (Qatar); Assistant referees: Taleb Salem Al-Marri (Qatar), Yaser Marad (Kuwait); Fourth official: Fahad Al-Marri (Qatar)

4 June International friendly	Hong Kong	0–1	Philippines	Mong Kok, Hong Kong
20:00 UTC+8	Chan Man Fai (yellow card) 80'; Chan Siu Ki (yellow card) 83'	Report	J. Younghusband 33'; Bahadoran (yellow card) 47'; Schröck (yellow card) 64'; Guirado (yellow card) 67'	Stadium: Mong Kok Stadium; Attendance: 4,578; Referee: Pratan Nasa Wang (Thailand)

10 September International friendly	Hong Kong	1–0	Singapore	Mong Kok, Hong Kong
20:00 UTC+8	Bai He 60'	Report	Hamzah (yellow card) 52'; Qiu Li (yellow card) 55'	Stadium: Mong Kok Stadium; Attendance: 3,990

15 October 2015 AFC Asian Cup; Qualification Group E	Hong Kong	0–4	United Arab Emirates	So Kon Po, Hong Kong
20:00 UTC+8	McKee (yellow card) 21'; Kwok Kin Pong (yellow card) 87'	Report	Mabkhout (yellow card) 6'; Mabkhout 30', 55', 90'; Abbas 90+5'	Stadium: Hong Kong Stadium; Attendance: 7,923; Referee: Kim Jong-Hyeok (South Korea)

15 November 2015 AFC Asian Cup; Qualification Group E	United Arab Emirates	4–0	Hong Kong	Abu Dhabi, United Arab Emirates
19:30 UTC+4	Al-Rejaibi 27'; Abbas 40'; Omar 80'; Al-Hammadi 88'; Salem (yellow card) 90'	Report	Andy (yellow card) 15'; Godfred (yellow card) 45'	Stadium: Mohammed Bin Zayed Stadium; Attendance: 10,871; Referee: Alireza Faghani (Iran)

19 November 2015 AFC Asian Cup; Qualification Group E	Hong Kong	0–2	Uzbekistan	So Kon Po, Hong Kong
20:00 UTC+8	Cheung Kin Fung (yellow card) 39' (yellow-red card) 45'; Chan Siu Ki (yellow card) 77'	Report	Shodiev 84'; Ahmedov 89'	Stadium: Hong Kong Stadium; Attendance: 5,679; Referee: Nawaf Shukralla (Bahrain); Assistant referees: Yaser Khalil Ebrahim Abdulla Tulefat (Bahrain), Ebrahim Moosa Saleh (Bahrain); Fourth official: Jameel Juma Abdulhusain Mohamed (Bahrain)

== 2014 ==
5 March 2015 AFC Asian Cup; Qualification Group E	Vietnam	3–1	Hong Kong	Hanoi, Vietnam
21:00 UTC+7	Huỳnh Quốc Anh 24'; Nguyễn Anh Đức 68'; Nguyễn Trọng Hoàng 83'	Report	Lo Kwan Yee 81'	Stadium: Mỹ Đình National Stadium; Attendance: 5,800; Referee: Mohammed Amirul Izwan Yaacob (Malaysia)

6 September International friendly	Vietnam	3–1	Hong Kong	Hai Phong, Vietnam
17:00 UTC+7	Nguyễn Hải Anh 3' 51'; Lê Công Vinh 66'		Lam Ka Wai 58'	Stadium: Lạch Tray Stadium; Referee: Sivakorn Pu-Udom (Thailand)

9 September International friendly	Singapore	0–0	Hong Kong	Hougang, Singapore
19:30 UTC+8				Stadium: Hougang Stadium; Referee: Bin Yaacob (Malaysia)

10 October International friendly	Hong Kong	2–1	Singapore	Mong Kok, Hong Kong
20:00 UTC+8	Xu Deshuai 7'; Ju Yingzhi 52'	Report	Shahril 90+4' (pen.)	Stadium: Mong Kok Stadium; Attendance: 2,203; Referee: Kao Jung Fang (Chinese Taipei)

14 October International friendly	Hong Kong	0–7	Argentina	So Kon Po, Hong Kong
20:00 UTC+8		Report	Banega 19'; Higuaín 42', 54'; Gaitán 44', 73'; Messi 66', 85'	Stadium: Hong Kong Stadium; Attendance: 20,230; Referee: Yuichi Nishimura (Japan)

13 November 2015 EAFF East Asian Cup preliminary round 2	North Korea	2–1	Hong Kong	Taipei, Taiwan
16:00 UTC+8	Ri Chol-myong 59'; O Hyok-chol 80'	Report	McKee 84'	Stadium: Taipei Municipal Stadium; Attendance: 800; Referee: Hiroyuki Kimura (Japan)

16 November 2015 EAFF East Asian Cup preliminary round 2	Chinese Taipei	0–1	Hong Kong	Taipei, Taiwan
19:00 UTC+8		Report	Lam Ka Wai 54' (pen.)	Stadium: Taipei Municipal Stadium; Attendance: 8,860; Referee: Kim Song-ho (North Korea)

19 November 2015 EAFF East Asian Cup preliminary round 2	Hong Kong	0–0	Guam	Taipei, Taiwan
16:00 UTC+8		Report		Stadium: Taipei Municipal Stadium; Attendance: 167; Referee: Kim Dae-yong (South Korea)

== 2015 ==
28 March International friendly	Hong Kong	1–0	Guam	Mong Kok, Hong Kong
16:00 UTC+8	McKee 10'			Stadium: Mong Kok Stadium; Attendance: 3,604

6 June International friendly	Malaysia	0–0	Hong Kong	Selangor, Malaysia
20:45 UTC+8				Stadium: Shah Alam Stadium

11 June 2018 FIFA World Cup; Qualification 2nd round Group C	Hong Kong	7–0	Bhutan	Mong Kok, Hong Kong
20:00 UTC+8	McKee 19' 57'; Kwesi 23'; Lo Kwan Yee 30'; Ju Yingzhi 42'; Lam Ka Wai 49' (pen.); Karikari 68'	Report (FIFA); Report (AFC)		Stadium: Mong Kok Stadium; Attendance: 6,326; Referee: Charymurat Kurbanov (Turkmenistan)

16 June 2018 FIFA World Cup; Qualification 2nd round Group C	Hong Kong	2–0	Maldives	Mong Kok, Hong Kong
20:00 UTC+8	Xu Deshuai 63'; Lam Ka Wai 67'	Report (FIFA); Report (AFC)		Stadium: Mong Kok Stadium; Attendance: 6,370; Referee: Adham Makhadmeh (Jordan)

3 September 2018 FIFA World Cup; Qualification 2nd round Group C	China	0–0	Hong Kong	Shenzhen, China
19:35 UTC+8		Report (FIFA); Report (AFC)		Stadium: Bao'an Stadium; Attendance: 26,173; Referee: Strebre Delovski (Australia)

8 September 2018 FIFA World Cup; Qualification 2nd round Group C	Hong Kong	2–3	Qatar	Mong Kok, Hong Kong
20:00 UTC+8	Bai He 87'; Godfred 89'	Report (FIFA); Report (AFC)	K. Boudiaf 22'; A. Hassan 62'; M. Musa 84'	Stadium: Mong Kok Stadium; Attendance: 6,396; Referee: Kim Sang-woo (South Korea)

8 October International friendly	Thailand	1–0	Hong Kong	Bangkok, Thailand
19:00 UTC+7	Bunmathan 90+5' (pen.)			Stadium: Rajamangala Stadium

13 October 2018 FIFA World Cup; Qualification 2nd round Group C	Bhutan	0–1	Hong Kong	Thimphu, Bhutan
18:00 UTC+6		Report (FIFA); Report (AFC)	Chan Siu Ki 89'	Stadium: Changlimithang Stadium; Attendance: 7,280; Referee: Aziz Asimov (Uzbekistan)

7 November International friendly	Hong Kong	5–0	Myanmar	Mong Kok, Hong Kong
17:00 UTC+8	McKee 3', 45'; Chan Siu Ki 33'; Sandro 66'; Alex Tayo 75'			Stadium: Mong Kok Stadium; Attendance: 5,247

12 November 2018 FIFA World Cup; Qualification 2nd round Group C	Maldives	0–1	Hong Kong	Malé, Maldives
15:50 UTC+5		Report (FIFA); Report (AFC)	Paulinho 13' (pen.)	Stadium: National Football Stadium; Attendance: 6,000; Referee: Ammar Al-Jeneibi (United Arab Emirates)

17 November 2018 FIFA World Cup; Qualification 2nd round Group C	Hong Kong	0–0	China	Mong Kok, Hong Kong
20:00 UTC+8		Report (FIFA); Report (AFC)		Stadium: Mong Kok Stadium; Attendance: 6,071; Referee: Nawaf Shukralla (Bahrain)

== 2016 ==
24 March 2018 FIFA World Cup; Qualification 2nd round Group C	Qatar	2–0	Hong Kong	Doha, Qatar
19:00 UTC+3	Al-Haidos 20'; Soria 87'	Report (FIFA); Report (AFC)		Stadium: Abdullah bin Khalifa Stadium; Attendance: 10,170; Referee: Dmitriy Mashentsev (Kyrgyzstan)

3 June 2016 AYA Bank Cup	Vietnam	2–2 (4–3 p)	Hong Kong	Yangon, Myanmar
15:00 UTC+6:30	Lê Công Vinh 57', 61'	Report	McKee 48', 77'	Stadium: Thuwunna Stadium; Attendance: 8,000; Referee: Thant Zin Oo (Myanmar)
	Penalties
	Trần Nguyên Mạnh (penalty scored); Quế Ngọc Hải (penalty scored); Lương Xuân Trường (penalty scored); Hoàng Đình Tùng (penalty missed); Nguyễn Văn Quyết (penalty scored)		(penalty missed) Itaparica; (penalty scored) Sandro; (penalty scored) Leung Kwun Chung; (penalty missed) Ngue; (penalty scored) Roberto

6 June 2016 AYA Bank Cup	Myanmar	3–0	Hong Kong	Yangon, Myanmar
15:00 UTC+6:30	Than Paing 22'; Maung Maung Lwin 74'; Ye Ko Oo 89'	Report		Stadium: Thuwunna Stadium; Attendance: 6,200; Referee: Mohd Amirul Izwan Bin Yaacob (Malaysia)

1 September International friendly	Hong Kong	4–2	Cambodia	Mong Kok, Hong Kong
20:00 UTC+8	McKee 11'; Itaparica 31'; Sandro 42' (pen.); Lo Kwan Yee 86'	Report	Polroth 20'; Vathanaka 61'	Stadium: Mong Kok Stadium; Attendance: 3,465

6 October International friendly	Cambodia	0–2	Hong Kong	Phnom Penh, Cambodia
19:45 UTC+7			Godfred 7'; Alex 32'	Stadium: Olympic Stadium; Attendance: 60,000

11 October International friendly	Hong Kong	2–0	Singapore	Mong Kok, Hong Kong
20:00 UTC+8	Alex 42'; Huang Yang 70'	Report		Stadium: Mong Kok Stadium; Attendance: 4,136

6 November 2017 EAFF East Asian Cup; Round 2	Hong Kong	3–2	Guam	Mong Kok, Hong Kong
18:00 UTC+8	Alex 19', 67' (pen.); Sandro 22'	Report	Cunliffe 74'; Malcolm 81'	Stadium: Mong Kok Stadium; Attendance: 3,299

9 November 2017 EAFF East Asian Cup; Round 2	Hong Kong	4–2	Chinese Taipei	Mong Kok, Hong Kong
20:00 UTC+8	Alex 21', 48', 70', 71'	Report	Chen Po-liang 62'; Chen Chao-an 88'	Stadium: Mong Kok Stadium; Attendance: 3,354

12 November 2017 EAFF East Asian Cup; Round 2	Hong Kong	0–1	North Korea	Mong Kok, Hong Kong
18:00 UTC+8		Report	Jong Il-gwan 22'	Stadium: Mong Kok Stadium; Attendance: 4,838

== 2017 ==
23 March International friendly	Jordan	4–0	Hong Kong	Amman, Jordan
18:00 UTC+2	Al-Bahit 12' Al-Dardour 43'; Al-Taamari 62' Bawab 84'			Stadium: King Abdullah II International Stadium

28 March 2019 AFC Asian Cup qualification 3rd round Group B	Lebanon	2–0	Hong Kong	Beirut, Lebanon
18:00 UTC+3	Ghaddar 27'; Maatouk 34'	Report		Stadium: Camille Chamoun Sports City Stadium; Attendance: 14,672; Referee: Banerjee Pranjal (India)

7 June International friendly	Hong Kong	0–0	Jordan	Mong Kok, Hong Kong
20:00 UTC+8		Report		Stadium: Mong Kok Stadium; Attendance: 2,742

13 June 2019 AFC Asian Cup qualification 3rd round Group B	Hong Kong	1–1	North Korea	So Kon Po, Hong Kong
20:00 UTC+8	Tan Chun Lok 45+1'	Report (AFC); Report (HKFA)	Kim Yu-song 46'	Stadium: Hong Kong Stadium; Attendance: 8,194; Referee: Jansen Foo (Singapore)

31 August International friendly	Singapore	1–1	Hong Kong	Kallang, Singapore
19:30 UTC+8	Baharudin 76' (pen.)		Chan Siu Ki 1'	Stadium: Jalan Besar Stadium

5 September 2019 AFC Asian Cup qualification 3rd round Group B	Malaysia	1–1	Hong Kong	Malacca City, Malaysia
20:45 UTC+8	Syazwan 56'	Report	Sandro 53'	Stadium: Hang Jebat Stadium; Attendance: 3,646; Referee: Chris Beath (Australia)

5 October International friendly	Hong Kong	4–0	Laos	Mong Kok, Hong Kong
20:00 UTC+8	Jordi 10' Wong Wai 13'; Godfred 73' Sandro 83' (pen.)	Report		Stadium: Mong Kok Stadium; Attendance: 2,239

10 October 2019 AFC Asian Cup qualification 3rd round Group B	Hong Kong	2–0	Malaysia	So Kon Po, Hong Kong
20:00 UTC+8	Jordi 44'; McKee 49'	Report (AFC); Report (HKFA)		Stadium: Hong Kong Stadium; Attendance: 7,920; Referee: Nivon Robesh Gamini (Sri Lanka)

9 November International friendly	Hong Kong	0–2	Bahrain	Mong Kok, Hong Kong
20:00 UTC+8		Report	Madan 80'; Al-Husaini 87'	Stadium: Mong Kok Stadium; Attendance: 2,485

14 November 2019 AFC Asian Cup qualification 3rd round Group B	Hong Kong	0–1	Lebanon	So Kon Po, Hong Kong
20:00 UTC+8		Report (AFC); Report (HKFA)	Maatouk 43' (pen.)	Stadium: Hong Kong Stadium; Attendance: 10,109; Referee: Khamis Al-Marri (Qatar)

== 2018 ==
27 March 2019 AFC Asian Cup qualification 3rd round Group B	North Korea	2–0	Hong Kong	Pyongyang, North Korea
17:00 UTC+8:30	Jong Il-gwan 19'; Pak Kwang-ryong 25'	Report		Stadium: Kim Il-sung Stadium; Attendance: 32,000; Referee: Omar Mohamed Al-Ali (United Arab Emirates)

11 October International Friendly	Hong Kong	0–1	Thailand	Mong Kok, Hong Kong
20:00 UTC+8		Report	Roller 2'	Stadium: Mong Kok Stadium; Attendance: 4,740; Referee: Kim Dae-yong (South Korea)

16 October International Friendly	Indonesia	1–1	Hong Kong	Cikarang, Indonesia
18:30 UTC+7	Gonçalves 39'	Report	Baise 69'	Stadium: Wibawa Mukti Stadium; Attendance: 3,729; Referee: Lim Bunthoeun (Cambodia)

11 November 2019 EAFF E-1 Football Championship; 2nd preliminary round	Chinese Taipei	1–2	Hong Kong	Taipei, Taiwan
18:10 UTC+8	Chen Ting-yang 81'	Report	McKee 65'; Chung Wai Keung 84'	Stadium: Taipei Municipal Stadium; Attendance: 1,793; Referee: Chae Sang-Hyeop (South Korea)

13 November 2019 EAFF E-1 Football Championship; 2nd preliminary round	Hong Kong	0–0	North Korea	Taipei, Taiwan
15:10 UTC+8		Report		Stadium: Taipei Municipal Stadium; Attendance: 228; Referee: Dwi Purba Adi Wicaksana (Indonesia)

16 November 2019 EAFF E-1 Football Championship; 2nd preliminary round	Mongolia	1–5	Hong Kong	Taipei, Taiwan
15:10 UTC+8	Artag 50'	Report	Sandro 24', 57'; McKee 36'; Baise 83'; Akande 87'	Stadium: Taipei Municipal Stadium; Attendance: 263; Referee: Chae Sang-Hyeop (South Korea)

== 2019 ==
11 June International Friendly	Hong Kong	0–2	Chinese Taipei	Mong Kok, Hong Kong
20:00 UTC+8			Chen Hao-wei 34', 45+2'	Stadium: Mong Kok Stadium; Attendance: 2,421; Referee: Kim Woo-sung (South Korea)

5 September 2022 FIFA World Cup; Qualification 2nd round Group C	Cambodia	1–1	Hong Kong	Phnom Penh, Cambodia
18:30 UTC+7	Keo 33'	Report (FIFA); Report (AFC)	Tan Chun Lok 16'	Stadium: Phnom Penh Olympic Stadium; Attendance: 45,500; Referee: Ilgiz Tantashev (Uzbekistan)

10 September 2022 FIFA World Cup; Qualification 2nd round Group C	Hong Kong	0–2	Iran	Hong Kong Island, Hong Kong
20:00 UTC+8		Report (FIFA); Report (AFC)	Azmoun 23'; Ansarifard 54'	Stadium: Hong Kong Stadium; Attendance: 13,942; Referee: Yudai Yamamoto (Japan)

10 October 2022 FIFA World Cup; Qualification 2nd round Group C	Iraq	2–0	Hong Kong	Basra, Iraq
19:00 UTC+3	M. Ali 37'; Adnan 79' (pen.)	Report (FIFA); Report (AFC)		Stadium: Basra International Stadium; Attendance: 32,340; Referee: Ammar Al-Jeneibi (United Arab Emirates)

14 November 2022 FIFA World Cup; Qualification 2nd round Group C	Hong Kong	0–0	Bahrain	Hong Kong Island, Hong Kong
20:00 UTC+8		Report (FIFA); Report (AFC)		Stadium: Hong Kong Stadium; Attendance: 4,541; Referee: Kim Dong-jin (South Korea)

19 November 2022 FIFA World Cup; Qualification 2nd round Group C	Hong Kong	2–0	Cambodia	Hong Kong Island, Hong Kong
20:00 UTC+8	Ha 20'; Roberto 83'	Report (FIFA); Report (AFC)		Stadium: Hong Kong Stadium; Attendance: 6,497; Referee: Ali Shaban (Kuwait)

11 December 2019 EAFF E-1 Football Championship	South Korea	2–0	Hong Kong	Busan, South Korea
19:30 UTC+9	Hwang In-beom 45+1'; Na Sang-ho 82'	Report		Stadium: Busan Asiad Main Stadium; Attendance: 1,070; Referee: Shaun Evans (Australia)

14 December 2019 EAFF E-1 Football Championship	Japan	5–0	Hong Kong	Busan, South Korea
19:30 UTC+9	Suga 8'; Tagawa 14'; Ogawa 26', 45+1', 58'	Report		Stadium: Busan Gudeok Stadium; Attendance: 1,276; Referee: Mohd Amirul Izwan Yaacob (Malaysia)

18 December 2019 EAFF E-1 Football Championship	Hong Kong	0–2	China	Busan, South Korea
16:15 UTC+9		Report	Ji Xiang 8'; Zhang Xizhe 71' (pen.)	Stadium: Busan Asiad Main Stadium; Referee: Sivakorn Pu-udom (Thailand)

== Head-to-head records ==
Hong Kong national football team head-to-head records (2010–2019)
Opponent	Pld	W	D	L	GF	GA	GD	Pts	Confederation
Argentina	1	0	0	1	0	7	–7	0	CONMEBOL
Australia	1	0	0	1	0	1	–1	0	AFC
Bahrain	3	0	1	2	0	6	–6	1	AFC
Bhutan	2	2	0	0	8	0	+8	6	AFC
Cambodia	3	2	1	0	7	3	+4	7	AFC
China	4	0	2	2	0	4	–4	2	AFC
Chinese Taipei	5	4	1	0	18	4	+14	13	AFC
Guam	4	3	1	0	6	3	+3	10	AFC
India	1	1	0	0	1	0	+1	3	AFC
Indonesia	1	0	1	0	1	1	0	1	AFC
Iran	1	0	0	1	0	2	–2	0	AFC
Iraq	1	0	0	1	0	2	–2	0	AFC
Japan	3	0	0	3	0	10	–10	0	AFC
Jordan	2	0	1	1	0	4	–4	1	AFC
Laos	1	1	0	0	4	0	+4	3	AFC
Lebanon	2	0	0	2	0	3	–3	0	AFC
Macau	2	2	0	0	9	1	+8	6	AFC
Malaysia	5	2	2	1	6	5	+1	8	AFC
Maldives	2	2	0	0	3	0	+3	6	AFC
Mongolia	1	1	0	0	5	1	+4	3	AFC
Myanmar	2	1	0	1	5	3	+2	3	AFC
North Korea	5	0	2	3	2	8	–6	2	AFC
Paraguay	1	0	0	1	0	7	–7	0	CONMEBOL
Philippines	3	1	1	1	7	6	+1	4	AFC
Qatar	2	0	0	2	2	5	–3	0	AFC
Saudi Arabia	2	0	0	2	0	8	–8	0	AFC
Singapore	6	3	2	1	6	4	+2	11	AFC
South Korea	2	0	0	2	0	7	–7	0	AFC
Thailand	1	0	0	1	0	1	–1	0	AFC
United Arab Emirates	2	0	0	2	0	8	–8	0	AFC
Uzbekistan	2	0	1	1	0	2	–2	1	AFC
Vietnam	4	1	1	2	5	8	–3	4	AFC
Yemen	1	0	1	0	0	0	0	1	AFC
Total	69	23	18	28	90	111	–21	87	
