= Ju Yingzhi =

Hong Kong footballer

Ju Yingzhi 鞠盈智
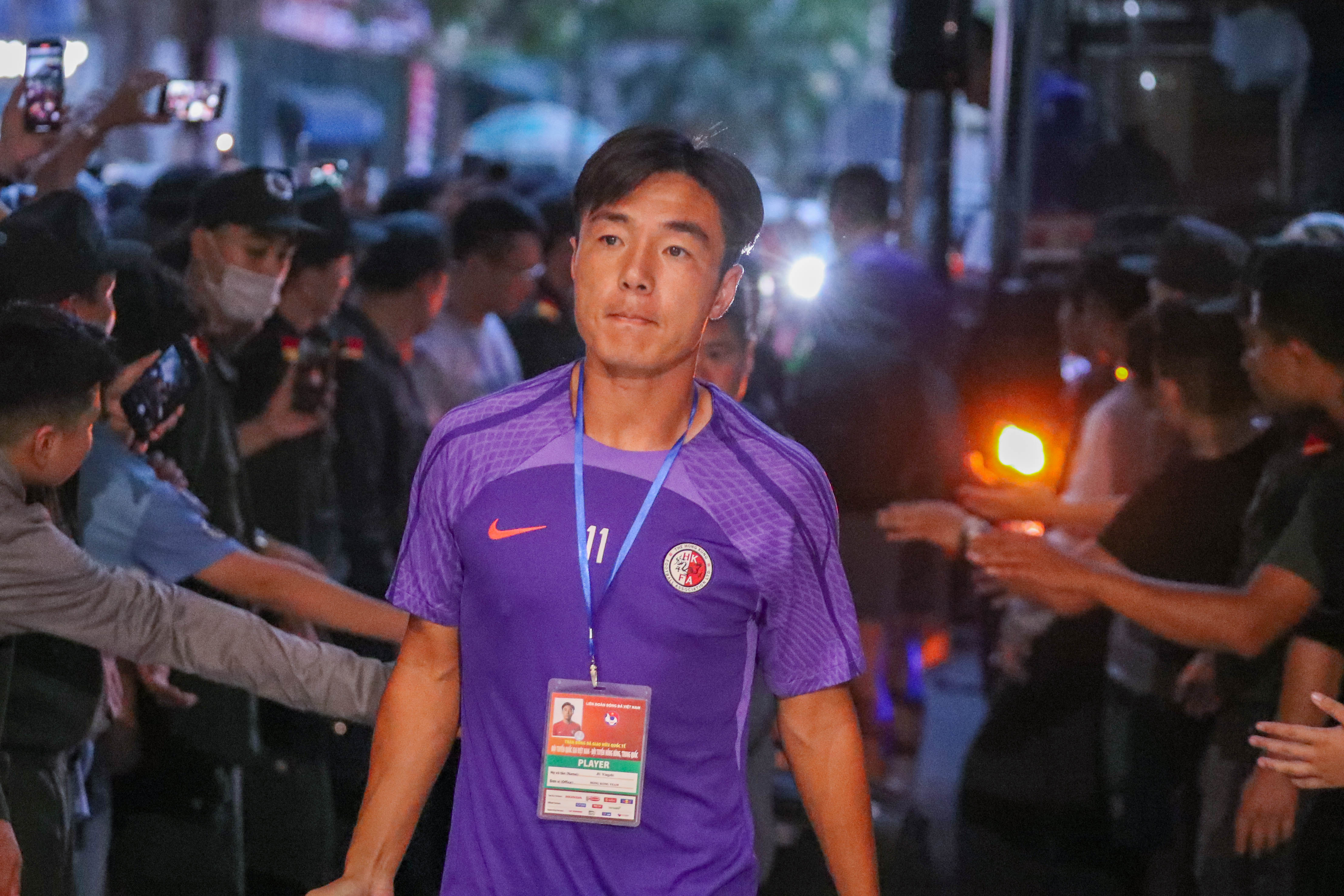
- Ju in 2023

Personal information
- Full name: Ju Yingzhi
- Date of birth: 24 July 1987 (age 39)
- Place of birth: Dalian, Liaoning, China
- Height: 1.74 m (5 ft 9 in)
- Position: Attacking midfielder

Youth career
- 2001–2005: Dalian Shide

Senior career*
Years	Team	Apps	(Gls)
2004–2008	Dalian Shide	1	(0)
2006–2008	→ Citizen (loan)	34	(5)
2008–2011	Citizen	35	(7)
2011–2015	Pegasus	45	(12)
2015–2018	Eastern	28	(1)
2018–2021	Kitchee	28	(6)
2021–2025	Southern	35	(2)
2025–2026	Sun Source	20	(1)
Total		226	(34)

International career
2005	China U19		
2010	Hong Kong U23	5	(1)
2010–2023	Hong Kong	44	(3)

Managerial career
- 2024–: Southern (assistant coach)
- * Club domestic league appearances and goals

Ju Yingzhi
- Traditional Chinese: 鞠盈智
- Simplified Chinese: 鞠盈智
Transcriptions
Standard Mandarin
- Hanyu Pinyin: Jū Yíngzhì
Yue: Cantonese
- Jyutping: guk^{1} jing^{4} zi^{3}

Ju Yingzhi (Chinese: 鞠盈智; born 24 July 1987) is a former professional footballer who played as an attacking midfielder. Born in China, he represented Hong Kong internationally. He is currently the assistant coach of Hong Kong Premier League club Southern.

Ju represented Hong Kong on the international level. He was also a member of the Hong Kong Asian Games football team in 2010.

== Club career ==
=== Citizen ===
Ju Yingzhi scored the winning goal to help Citizen beat Sun Hei 5–4 in a league game.

=== Pegasus ===
Ju Yingzhi signed to join Pegasus for the 2011–12 Hong Kong First Division League season. He is reported to have earned a huge pay rise for the move. But it was revealed that he had to go through surgery to cure a problem with his knee. He will therefore miss the first two to three months of the 2011–12 season.

=== Kitchee ===
On 15 June 2018, it was confirmed that Ju had signed with fellow Hong Kong Premier League club Kitchee.

=== Southern ===
On 10 August 2021, it was announced that Ju had signed for Southern.

On 8 May 2025, Ju announced his retirement from professional football after the season.

== International career ==
On 9 October 2010, Ju made his international debut for Hong Kong in a 2010 Long Teng Cup match against Philippines.

On 11 November 2010, Ju scored one of the goals in the 4–0 win over Bangladesh U-23 in the group stage of the 2010 Asian Games in Guangzhou.

On 26 December 2023, Ju was named in Hong Kong's squad for the 2023 AFC Asian Cup.

On 24 January 2024, Ju announced his retirement from international football.

== Career statistics ==
=== International ===
As of 12 October 2023

National team	Year	Apps	Goals
Hong Kong	2010	3	1
Hong Kong	2011	0	0
Hong Kong	2012	1	0
Hong Kong	2013	4	0
Hong Kong	2014	7	1
Hong Kong	2015	5	1
Hong Kong	2016	0	0
Hong Kong	2017	6	0
Hong Kong	2018	0	0
Hong Kong	2019	5	0
Hong Kong	2020	0	0
Hong Kong	2021	0	0
Hong Kong	2022	8	0
Hong Kong	2022	8	0
Hong Kong	2023	6	0
Total		44	3

==== Hong Kong ====
Hong Kong appearances and goals
#	Date	Venue	Opponent	Result	Scored	Competition
1	9 October 2010	Kaohsiung National Stadium, Kaohsiung	Philippines	4–2	0	2010 Long Teng Cup
2	10 October 2010	Kaohsiung National Stadium, Kaohsiung	Macau	4–0	1	2010 Long Teng Cup
3	12 October 2010	Kaohsiung National Stadium, Kaohsiung	Chinese Taipei	1–1	0	2010 Long Teng Cup
4	16 October 2012	Mong Kok Stadium, Mong Kok, Kowloon	Malaysia	0–3	0	Friendly
5	10 September 2013	Mong Kok Stadium, Mong Kok, Hong Kong	Singapore	1–0	0	Friendly
6	15 October 2013	Hong Kong Stadium, So Kon Po, Hong Kong	United Arab Emirates	0–4	0	2015 AFC Asian Cup qualification
7	15 November 2013	Mohammed Bin Zayed Stadium, Abu Dhabi, United Arab Emirates	United Arab Emirates	0–4	0	2015 AFC Asian Cup qualification
8	19 November 2013	Hong Kong Stadium, So Kon Po, Hong Kong	Uzbekistan	0–2	0	2015 AFC Asian Cup qualification
9	5 March 2014	Mỹ Đình National Stadium, Hanoi, Vietnam	Vietnam	1–3	0	2015 AFC Asian Cup qualification
10	9 September 2014	Hougang Stadium, Singapore	Singapore	0–0	0	Friendly
11	10 October 2014	Mong Kok Stadium, Mong Kok, Hong Kong	Singapore	2–1	1	Friendly
12	14 October 2014	Hong Kong Stadium, So Kon Po, Hong Kong	Argentina	0–7	0	Friendly
13	13 November 2014	Taipei Municipal Stadium, Taipei, Taiwan	North Korea	1–2	0	2015 EAFF East Asian Cup preliminary round 2
14	16 November 2014	Taipei Municipal Stadium, Taipei, Taiwan	Chinese Taipei	1–0	0	2015 EAFF East Asian Cup preliminary round 2
15	19 November 2014	Taipei Municipal Stadium, Taipei, Taiwan	Guam	0–0	0	2015 EAFF East Asian Cup preliminary round 2
16	28 March 2015	Mong Kok Stadium, Mong Kok, Hong Kong	Guam	1–0	0	Friendly
17	11 June 2015	Mong Kok Stadium, Mong Kok, Hong Kong	Bhutan	7–0	1	2018 FIFA World Cup qualification
18	8 October 2015	Rajamangala Stadium, Bangkok, Thailand	Thailand	0–1	0	Friendly
19	13 October 2015	Changlimithang Stadium, Thimphu, Bhutan	Bhutan	1–0	0	2018 FIFA World Cup qualification
20	7 November 2015	Mong Kok Stadium, Mong Kok, Hong Kong	Myanmar	5–0	0	Friendly
21	23 March 2017	King Abdullah II Stadium, Amman, Jordan	Jordan	0–4	0	Friendly
22	28 March 2017	Camille Chamoun Sports City Stadium, Beirut, Lebanon	Lebanon	0–2	0	2019 AFC Asian Cup qualifying round – third round
23	7 June 2017	Mong Kok Stadium, Mong Kok, Hong Kong	Jordan	0–0	0	Friendly
24	13 June 2017	Hong Kong Stadium, So Kon Po, Hong Kong	North Korea	1–1	0	2019 AFC Asian Cup qualifying round – third round
25	31 August 2017	Jalan Besar Stadium, Singapore	Singapore	1–1	0	Friendly
26	10 October 2017	Hong Kong Stadium, So Kon Po, Hong Kong	Malaysia	2–0	0	2019 AFC Asian Cup qualifying round – third round
27	11 June 2019	Mong Kok Stadium, Mong Kok, Hong Kong	Chinese Taipei	0–2	0	Friendly
28	5 September 2019	Phnom Penh Olympic Stadium, Phnom Penh, Cambodia	Cambodia	1–1	0	2022 FIFA World Cup qualification
29	11 December 2019	Busan Asiad Main Stadium, Busan, South Korea	South Korea	0–2	0	2019 EAFF E-1 Football Championship
30	14 December 2019	Busan Gudeok Stadium, Busan, South Korea	Japan	0–5	0	2019 EAFF E-1 Football Championship
31	8 June 2022	Salt Lake Stadium, Kolkata, India	Afghanistan	2–1	0	2023 AFC Asian Cup qualification
32	11 June 2022	Salt Lake Stadium, Kolkata, India	Cambodia	3–0	0	2023 AFC Asian Cup qualification
33	14 June 2022	Salt Lake Stadium, Kolkata, India	India	0–4	0	2023 AFC Asian Cup qualification
34	19 July 2022	Kashima Stadium, Kashima, Japan	Japan	0–6	0	2022 EAFF E-1 Football Championship
35	24 July 2022	Toyota Stadium, Toyota, Japan	South Korea	0–3	0	2022 EAFF E-1 Football Championship
36	27 July 2022	Toyota Stadium, Toyota, Japan	China	0–1	0	2022 EAFF E-1 Football Championship
37	21 September 2022	Mong Kok Stadium, Mong Kok, Hong Kong	Myanmar	2–0	0	Friendly
38	24 September 2022	Hong Kong Stadium, So Kon Po, Hong Kong	Myanmar	0–0	0	Friendly
49	23 March 2023	Mong Kok Stadium, Mong Kok, Hong Kong	Singapore	1–1	0	Friendly
40	28 March 2023	Sultan Ibrahim Stadium, Johor, Malaysia	Malaysia	0–2	0	Friendly
41	15 June 2023	Lạch Tray Stadium, Hai Phong, Vietnam	Vietnam	0–1	0	Friendly
42	19 June 2023	Hong Kong Stadium, So Kon Po, Hong Kong	Thailand	0–1	0	Friendly
43	11 September 2023	Hong Kong Stadium, So Kon Po, Hong Kong	Brunei	10–0	0	Friendly
44	12 October 2023	Hong Kong Stadium, So Kon Po, Hong Kong	Bhutan	4–0	0	2026 FIFA World Cup qualification

==== Hong Kong U-23 ====
Hong Kong U23 appearances and goals
#	Date	Venue	Opponent	Result	Scored	Competition
2010–11
	28 September 2010	Sai Tso Wan Recreation Ground, Hong Kong	Australia	2–2	1	Friendly
	2 November 2010	Siu Sai Wan Sports Ground, Hong Kong	South China	0–4	0	Friendly
1	7 November 2010	Huadu Stadium, Guangzhou, China	United Arab Emirates	1–1	0	2010 Asian Games
2	9 November 2010	Huadu Stadium, Guangzhou, China	Uzbekistan	1–0	0	2010 Asian Games
3	11 November 2010	Huadu Stadium, Guangzhou, China	Bangladesh	4–1	1	2010 Asian Games
4	15 November 2010	Huangpu Sports Center, Guangzhou, China	Oman	0–3	0	2010 Asian Games

== Honours ==
=== Club ===
Dalian Shide

- Chinese Super League: 2005
- China U19 Champions Cup: 2006

Citizen

- Hong Kong FA Cup: 2007–08
- Hong Kong Senior Challenge Shield: 2010–11

Pegasus

- Hong Kong League Cup: 2011–12

Eastern

- Hong Kong Premier League: 2015–16
- Hong Kong Senior Shield: 2015–16

Kitchee

- Hong Kong Premier League: 2019–20, 2020–21
- Hong Kong Senior Shield: 2018–19
- Hong Kong FA Cup: 2018–19
- Hong Kong Sapling Cup: 2019–20

Southern

- Hong Kong Sapling Cup: 2022–23, 2024–25

=== International ===
Hong Kong

- Long Teng Cup: 2010
