= Long Teng Cup =

- Founded: 2010
- Abolished: 2011
- Teams: 4
- Last champions: Hong Kong (2nd title)
- Most championships: Hong Kong (2 titles)

The Long Teng Cup was an annual international friendly football tournament organized by the Chinese Taipei Football Association and held in Kaohsiung, Taiwan. The competition has been contested by Chinese Taipei, Hong Kong, Macau and Philippines. Hong Kong has won the first two editions of the tournament.

== Tournament winners ==
Year	Host city	1st place	2nd place	3rd place	4th place
2010	Kaohsiung	Hong Kong U-23	Chinese Taipei	Philippines	Macau
2011	Kaohsiung	Hong Kong	Philippines	Chinese Taipei	Macau
2012	No tournament; see also 2012 Philippine Peace Cup				

== Top goalscorers ==
Rank	Player	Goals
1	(Philippines) Emelio Caligdong	5
2	(Philippines) Ian Araneta	4
3	(Hong Kong) Lo Kwan Yee	3
3	(Philippines) Phil Younghusband	3
3	(Chinese Taipei) Lo Chih-an	3
6	(Hong Kong) Chan Siu Ki	2
6	(Hong Kong) Lam Hok Hei	2
6	(Hong Kong) Lee Hong Lim	2
6	(Hong Kong) Sham Kwok Keung	2
6	(Hong Kong) Wong Chin Hung	2
6	(Hong Kong) Xu Deshuai	2
6	(Macau) Leong Ka Hang	2
6	(Chinese Taipei) Chen Po-hao	2
6	(Chinese Taipei) Chen Po-liang	2

== See also ==
- List of sporting events in Taiwan
