= Araneta =

Araneta may refer to:

- Araneta family, prominent Filipino-Spanish family in business, politics and religion
- Araneta City, commercial area in Quezon City, Philippines
- Araneta Coliseum, indoor stadium in the Araneta City
- De La Salle Araneta University, Lasallian university in Malabon, Philippines
- Ian Araneta, Filipino footballer
