= Chan Man Fai =

Hong Kong footballer

Chan Man Fai 陳文輝
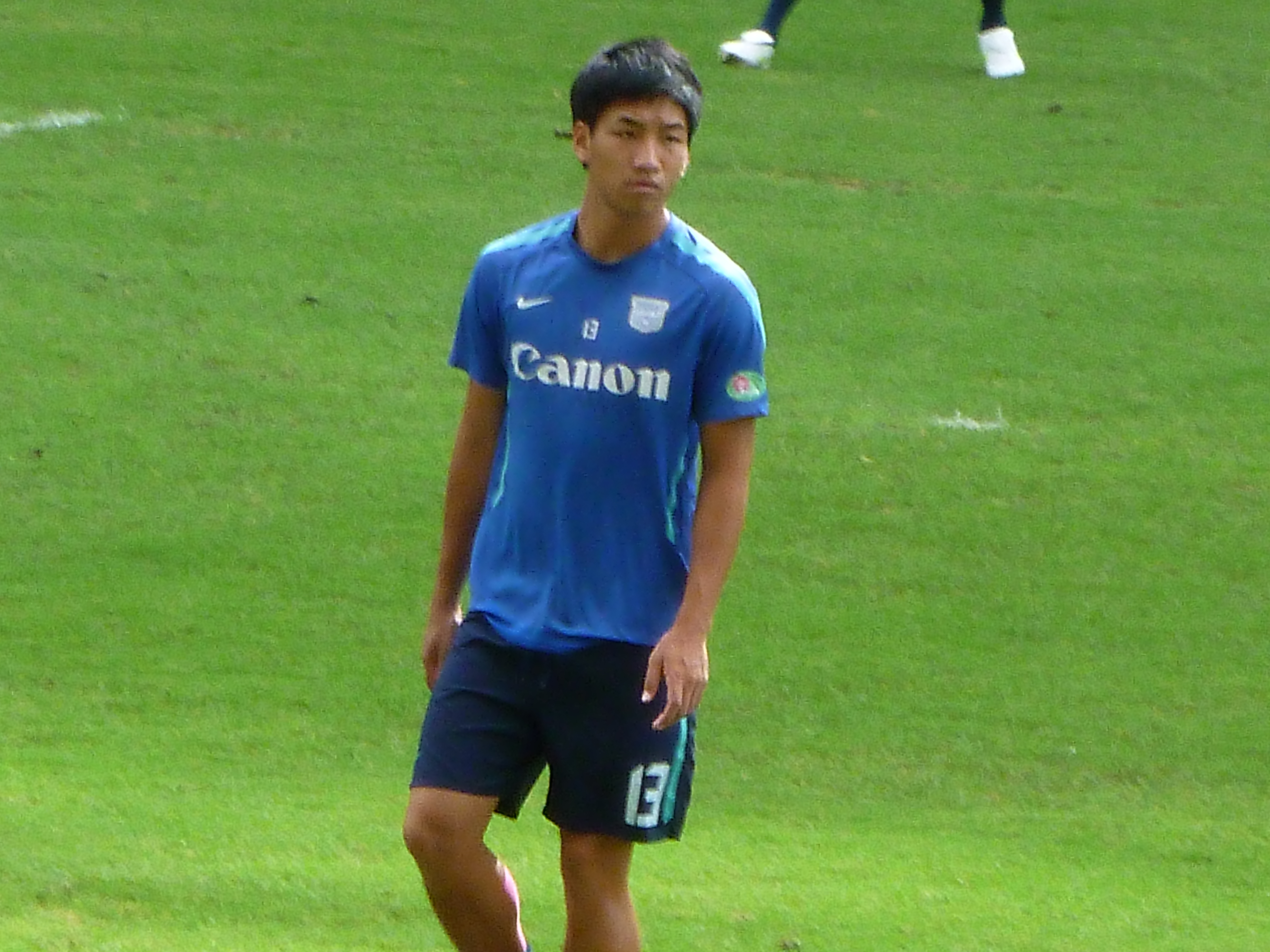

Personal information
- Full name: Chan Man Fai
- Date of birth: 19 June 1988 (age 38)
- Place of birth: Hong Kong
- Height: 1.84 m (6 ft 0 in)
- Positions: Attacking midfielder; striker

Team information
- Current team: Sha Tin
- Number: 19

Senior career*
Years	Team	Apps	(Gls)
2004–2005	Xiangxue Pharmaceutical	5	(0)
2005–2007	Hong Kong 08	38	(3)
2007–2008	Workable	22	(2)
2008–2014	Kitchee	70	(13)
2014–2015	Pegasus	12	(2)
2016–2017	South China	0	(0)
2017–2019	Southern	23	(0)
2019–2020	Tai Po	9	(1)
2020–2022	Citizen	25	(7)
2022–2025	Kowloon City	58	(20)
2025–2026	Supreme	12	(4)
2026–	Sha Tin	1	(0)

International career^{‡}
2007–2010	Hong Kong U-23	9	(2)
2010–2014	Hong Kong	17	(2)

Managerial career
- 2026–: Sha Tin (assistant coach)
- * Club domestic league appearances and goals as of 13 September 2026 ‡ National team caps and goals as of 19 November 2014

Chan Man Fai (Chinese: 陳文輝; Cantonese Yale: Chàn Mànfāi; born 19 June 1988) is a Hong Kong professional footballer who currently plays as a midfielder for Hong Kong Premier League club Sha Tin. He is also the assistant coach of the club.

== Club career ==
=== Kitchee ===
In the 2011–12 Hong Kong Senior Challenge Shield first-round away match against Pegasus, Chan was sent off for handball, his second bookable offence. He missed the home match as a result.

=== Pegasus ===
Due to injury, Chan only played four matches for Pegasus, scored two goals and got two yellow cards.

=== South China ===
After the end of the 2014–15 season, Chan signed for South China. At the time of signing, he claimed that his relationships with the local players at South China were behind his reasoning to join. However, he struggled with injuries during his season there and left the club without making any appearances.

=== Southern ===
On 7 July 2017, Southern announced via their Facebook page that Chan had signed with the club due to his desire to work with head coach Cheng Siu Chung.

On 31 May 2019, it was announced that Chan would leave Southern after two seasons.

=== Tai Po ===
On 29 July 2019, Chan was unveiled as a Tai Po player.

=== Kowloon City ===
In July 2022, Chan joined Kowloon City.

=== Sha Tin ===
On 8 August 2026, Chan returned to top-flight and joined Sha Tin as a player-coach.

== International career ==
As a member of the Hong Kong national under-23 football team, Chan took part in the 2010 Asian Games. He appeared as a substitute, took a pass from teammate Lam Hok Hei and scored the equalising goal for Hong Kong against United Arab Emirates in the 81st minute in the first group match. Afterwards, he claimed this was the most important goal of his career so far. United Arab Emirates did not concede another goal again until the final when they lost to Japan. He also scored against Bangladesh to give Hong Kong a 4–1 victory.

== Honours ==
Kitchee

- Hong Kong First Division: 2010–11

== Career statistics ==
=== Club ===
As of 14 April 2007

Club	Season	No.	League		League Cup		Senior Shield		FA Cup		AFC Cup		Total	
Club	Season	No.	Apps	Goals	Apps	Goals	Apps	Goals	Apps	Goals	Apps	Goals	Apps	Goals
Xiangxue Pharm.	2004–05	?	?	?	—	—	—	—	?	?	—	—		
Xiangxue Pharm.	Total													
Hong Kong 08	2005–06	15	?	0	?	0	1	0	1	1	—	—	?	1
Hong Kong 08	2006–07	17	?	2	4	0	1	0	—	—	—	—	?	2
Hong Kong 08	Total													
Career Total														

=== International ===
==== Hong Kong ====
As of 19 November 2013

#	Date	Venue	Opponent	Result	Scored	Competition
1	9 October 2010	Kaohsiung National Stadium, Kaohsiung	Philippines	4–2	1	2010 Long Teng Cup
2	10 October 2010	Kaohsiung National Stadium, Kaohsiung	Macau	4–0	0	2010 Long Teng Cup
3	12 October 2010	Kaohsiung National Stadium, Kaohsiung	Chinese Taipei	1–1	0	2010 Long Teng Cup
4	29 February 2012	Mong Kok Stadium, Hong Kong	Chinese Taipei	5–1	1	Friendly
5	1 June 2012	Hong Kong Stadium, Hong Kong	Singapore	1–0	0	Friendly
6	14 November 2012	Shah Alam Stadium, Shah Alam, Malaysia	Malaysia	1–1	0	Friendly
7	3 December 2012	Mong Kok Stadium, Mong Kok, Hong Kong	Australia	0–1	0	2013 EAFF East Asian Cup Preliminary Competition Round 2
8	22 March 2013	Mong Kok Stadium, Mong Kok, Hong Kong	Vietnam	1–0	0	2015 AFC Asian Cup qualification
9	4 June 2013	Mong Kok Stadium, Mong Kok, Hong Kong	Philippines	0–1	0	Friendly
10	19 November 2013	Hong Kong Stadium, So Kon Po, Hong Kong	Uzbekistan	0–2	0	2015 AFC Asian Cup qualification

==== Hong Kong U-23 ====
As of 1 February 2011

#	Date	Venue	Opponents	Result	Goals	Competition
1	14 February 2007	Hong Kong Stadium, Hong Kong	Bangladesh	0–1	0	2008 Summer Olympics qualification
2	28 February 2007	Olympic Stadium, Tokyo, Japan	Japan	0–3	0	2008 Summer Olympics qualification
3	14 March 2007	Hong Kong Stadium, Hong Kong	Syria	0–2	0	2008 Summer Olympics qualification
4	28 March 2007	Mong Kok Stadium, Hong Kong	Malaysia	0–1	0	2008 Summer Olympics qualification
5	20 June 2009	Mong Kok Stadium, Hong Kong	Macau	5–1	0	Hong Kong-Macau Interport
6	20 June 2010	Estádio Campo Desportivo, Macau	Macau	5–1	0	Hong Kong-Macau Interport
-	2 November 2010	Siu Sai Wan Sports Ground, Hong Kong	South China	0–4	0	Friendly
7	7 November 2010	Huadu Stadium, Guangzhou, China	United Arab Emirates	1–1	1	2010 Asian Games
8	11 November 2010	Huadu Stadium, Guangzhou, China	Bangladesh	4–1	1	2010 Asian Games
9	15 November 2010	Huangpu Sports Center, Guangzhou, China	Oman	0–3	0	2010 Asian Games
