= 2010 Long Teng Cup =

2010 Dragon Cup

Tournament details
- Host country: Taiwan
- Dates: 8 October – 12 October
- Teams: 4 (from 4 confederations)
- Venue(s): 1 (in 1 host city)

Final positions
- Champions: Hong Kong (1st title)
- Runners-up: Chinese Taipei
- Third place: Philippines
- Fourth place: Macau

Tournament statistics
- Matches played: 6
- Goals scored: 27 (4.5 per match)
- Attendance: 7,440 (1,240 per match)
- Top scorer(s): (Philippines) Ian Araneta (4 goals)

The 2010 Long Teng Cup (Chinese: 龍騰盃國際足球賽) was an international football competition held in Kaohsiung, Taiwan from 8 October 2010 to 12 October 2010.

The edition featured three senior national teams and Hong Kong national under-23 football team which was preparing for the 2010 Asian Games.

== Participating nations ==
- Chinese Taipei (Hosts)
- Hong Kong U-23
- Philippines
- Macau

== Matches ==
=== Round robin tournament ===
- All times are National Standard Time – UTC+8

Team	Pld	W	D	L	GF	GA	GD	Pts
Hong Kong	3	2	1	0	9	3	+6	7
Chinese Taipei	3	1	2	0	9	3	+6	5
Philippines	3	1	1	1	8	5	+3	4
Macau	3	0	0	3	1	16	−15	0

9 October 2010
17:00

Hong Kong	4–2	Philippines
Chan Man Fai 5'; Xu Deshuai 31'; Lo Kwan Yee 84'; Ju Yingzhi 90+1'	Report (Chi)	P. Younghusband 58' (pen.), 69'

Kaohsiung National Stadium, Kaohsiung
Attendance: 650
Referee: Kao Jung-fang (Chinese Taipei)

9 October 2010
19:30

Chinese Taipei	7–1	Macau
Lin Cheng-yi 16'; Lo Chih-en 43'; Lo Chih-an 45'; Chen Po-hao 46', 77'; Chang Han 55'; Chen Po-liang 67'	Report (Chi)	Leong Ka Hang 82'

Kaohsiung National Stadium, Kaohsiung
Attendance: 1,000
Referee: 粘三華 (Chinese Taipei)

10 October 2010
17:00

Macau	0–4	Hong Kong
	Report (Chi)	Tam Lok Hin 38'; Xu Deshuai 52'; Lam Hok Hei 72', 74'

Kaohsiung National Stadium, Kaohsiung
Attendance: 1,200
Referee: Yu Ming-hsun (Chinese Taipei)

10 October 2010
19:30

Chinese Taipei	1–1	Philippines
Lo Chih-an 48'	Report (Chi)	Araneta 90+3'

Kaohsiung National Stadium, Kaohsiung
Attendance: 890
Referee: Kao Tsai-hu (Chinese Taipei)

12 October 2010
17:00

Philippines	5–0	Macau
Caligdong 6'; Araneta 13', 54', 90'; J. Younghusband 48'	Report (Chi)

Kaohsiung National Stadium, Kaohsiung
Attendance: 700
Referee: Yu Ming-hsun (Chinese Taipei)

12 October 2010
19:30

Chinese Taipei	1–1	Hong Kong
Lo Chih-an 40'	Report (Chi)	Lo Kwan Yee 75' (pen.)

Kaohsiung National Stadium, Kaohsiung
Attendance: 3,000
Referee: Kao Tsai-hu (Chinese Taipei)

== Winner ==
2010 Long Teng Cup champion

Hong Kong

== Goal scorers ==
4 goals

- (Philippines) Ian Araneta

3 goals

- (Chinese Taipei) Lo Chih-an

2 goals

- (Hong Kong) Lam Hok Hei
- (Hong Kong) Lo Kwan Yee
- (Hong Kong) Xu Deshuai
- (Philippines) Phil Younghusband
- (Chinese Taipei) Chen Po-hao

1 goal

- (Hong Kong) Chan Man Fai
- (Hong Kong) Ju Yingzhi
- (Hong Kong) Tam Lok Hin
- (Macau) Leong Ka Hang
- (Philippines) Emelio Caligdong
- (Philippines) James Younghusband
- (Chinese Taipei) Chang Han
- (Chinese Taipei) Chen Po-liang
- (Chinese Taipei) Lin Cheng-yi
- (Chinese Taipei) Lo Chih-en

== See also ==
- List of sporting events in Taiwan
