= Rugby sevens at the 2009 World Games =

- Host nation: (Taiwan) Kaohsiung

Men
- Date: 24–25 July 2009
- Champion: Fiji
- Runner-up: Portugal
- Third: South Africa

Tournament details
- Matches played: 24

Rugby union, specifically in the sevens format, was introduced as a World Games sport for men at the 2001 World Games in Akita. Fiji entered the 2009 games as the two time defending gold medalists. Held on July 24 and 25 of 2009 in Taiwan, Fiji clinched gold for the 3rd time in front of a crowd of 39,000. The Fijian win preserves Fiji as the only nation to ever capture gold at the games. Represented were South Africa (the reigning IRB Sevens World Series Champions), Portugal (the reigning European Sevens Champions), Argentina (the reigning USA Sevens Champions), Fiji (the reigning World Games gold medalists), and Chinese Taipei (the host nation). The USA was the biggest disappointment of Day 1 going 0–3 having been expected to compete for a medal. The biggest surprise of the event was Portugal finding their way into the gold-medal match and coming away with the Silver Medal.

== Teams ==
8 Teams took part in this tournament:

- Argentina
- Fiji
- Hong Kong
- Japan
- Portugal
- South Africa
- Chinese Taipei
- United States

== Pools ==
=== Pool A ===
Pos	Team	Pld	W	L	PF	PA	PD	Pts
1	South Africa	3	3	0	0	62	12	50
2	Portugal	3	2	0	1	46	19	27
3	Chinese Taipei	3	1	0	2	27	65	−38
4	United States	3	0	0	3	31	70	−39

24 July

South Africa	29–0	Chinese Taipei

Kaohsiung National Stadium, Kaohsiung

24 July

Portugal	22–7	United States

Kaohsiung National Stadium, Kaohsiung

24 July

South Africa	7–5	Portugal

Kaohsiung National Stadium, Kaohsiung

24 July

Chinese Taipei	22–17	United States

Kaohsiung National Stadium, Kaohsiung

24 July

South Africa	26–7	United States

Kaohsiung National Stadium, Kaohsiung

24 July

Portugal	19–5	Chinese Taipei

Kaohsiung National Stadium, Kaohsiung

=== Pool B ===
Pos	Team	Pld	W	L	PF	PA	PD	Pts
1	Argentina	3	3	0	0	63	12	51
2	Fiji	3	2	0	1	52	37	15
4	Japan	3	1	0	2	35	39	−4
5	Hong Kong	3	0	0	3	15	77	−62

24 July

Fiji	26–10	Hong Kong

Kaohsiung National Stadium, Kaohsiung

24 July

Argentina	15–5	Japan

Kaohsiung National Stadium, Kaohsiung

24 July

Fiji	19–10	Japan

Kaohsiung National Stadium, Kaohsiung

24 July

Argentina	31–0	Hong Kong

Kaohsiung National Stadium, Kaohsiung

24 July

Argentina	17–7	Fiji

Kaohsiung National Stadium, Kaohsiung

24 July

Japan	20–5	Hong Kong

Kaohsiung National Stadium, Kaohsiung

=== 5th to 8th playoffs ===
5th place semifinals
25 July – Kaohsiung National Stadium
United States	29
Japan	24
25 July – Kaohsiung National Stadium
Chinese Taipei	17
Hong Kong	12

5th place final
25 July – Kaohsiung National Stadium
United States	21
Chinese Taipei	19
7th place final
25 July – Kaohsiung National Stadium
Japan	20
Hong Kong	5

=== Medal ===
Quarterfinals
25 July – Kaohsiung National Stadium
Argentina	19
United States	12
25 July – Kaohsiung National Stadium
Portugal	17
Japan	0
25 July – Kaohsiung National Stadium
Fiji	28
Chinese Taipei	0
25 July– Kaohsiung National Stadium
South Africa	39
Hong Kong	0

Semifinals
25 July – Kaohsiung National Stadium
Argentina	12
Portugal	19
25 July – Kaohsiung National Stadium
Fiji	21
South Africa	7

Final
25 July – Kaohsiung National Stadium
Portugal	10
Fiji	43
Bronze final
25 July – Kaohsiung National Stadium
Argentina	0
South Africa	17
