= Tam Lok Hin =

Hong Kong footballer (born 1991)

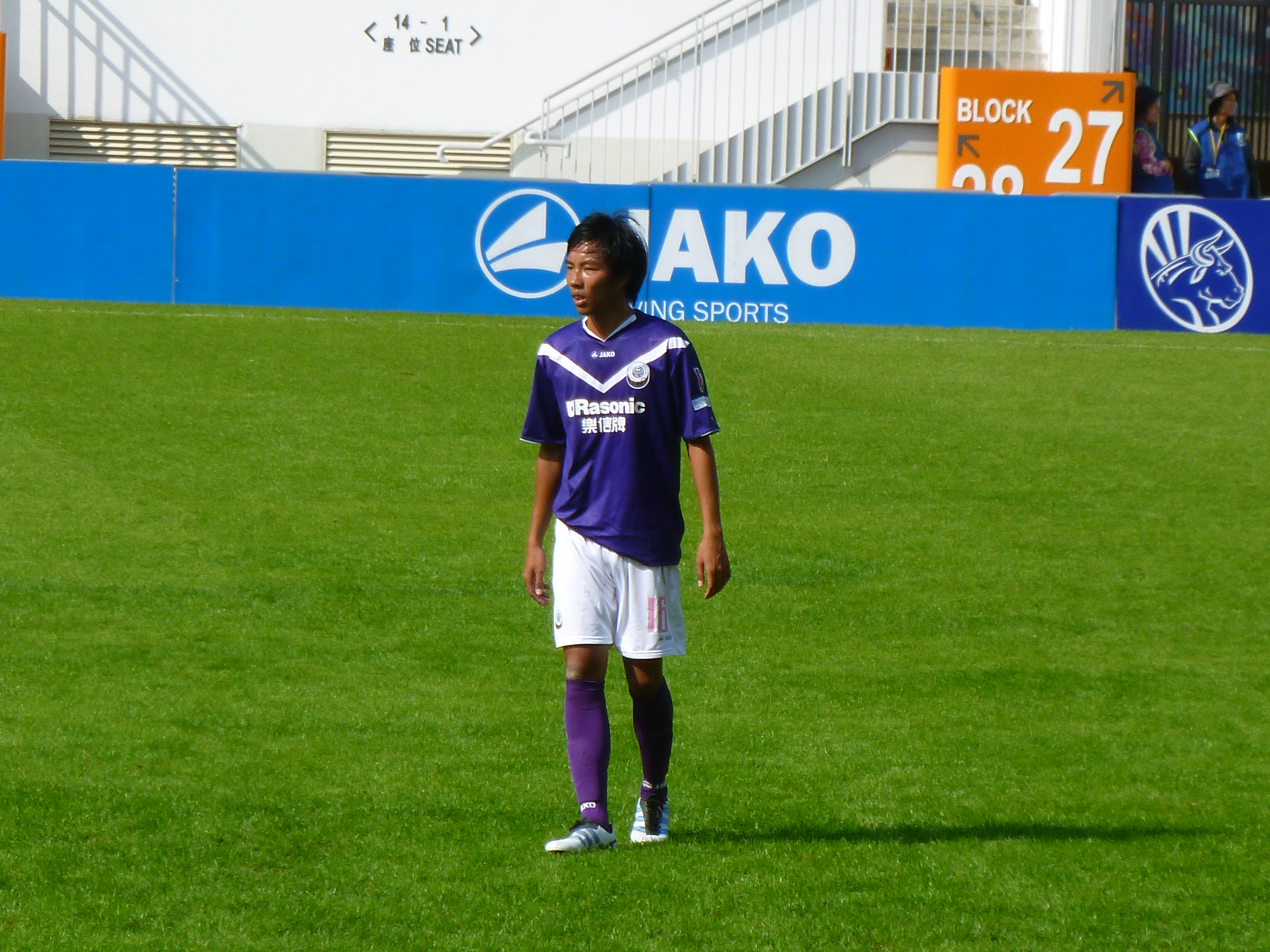

Personal information
- Full name: Tam Lok Hin
- Date of birth: 19 January 1991 (age 35)
- Place of birth: Hong Kong
- Height: 1.75 m (5 ft 9 in)
- Position: Midfielder

Youth career
- 2006–2007: Hong Kong 09

Senior career*
Years	Team	Apps	(Gls)
2007–2008	Workable	1	(0)
2008–2009	Eastern	15	(3)
2009–2014	Citizen	70	(4)
2014–2015	YFCMD	10	(0)
2015–2018	Yuen Long	42	(1)
2018–2021	Lee Man	23	(0)
2021–2022	Citizen	11	(1)
2022–2024	Kowloon City	47	(10)
2024–	Resources Capital	45	(2)

International career
2009	Hong Kong U-19	4	(4)
2010–2012	Hong Kong U-23	12	(2)
2010	Hong Kong	3	(1)

Managerial career
- 2022–2023: Tai Po (assistant coach)
- * Club domestic league appearances and goals as of 17 May 2026

Tam Lok Hin (Chinese: 談樂軒, born 19 January 1991) is a Hong Kong former professional footballer who played as a midfielder.

== Club career ==
=== Workable ===
Tam Lok Hin made his Hong Kong First Division debut on 12 January 2008, in a match against Sun Hei, being substituted in the 70th minutes. However, this was his only league appearance in the season.

=== Eastern ===
After Workable was relegated at the end of the 2007–08 season, Tam followed former Workable coach Lee Kin Wo and manager Chan Hiu Ming to Eastern.

He got more chances to break into the Eastern first team during the 2008–09 season. He had made 13 league appearances and scored 3 three league goals. His first league goal was scored on 24 October 2008, helping his team to win 5–0 over Tuen Mun Progoal. He then scored 2 goals in a match for the first team on 15 November 2008, helping his team to win 5–0 over Mutual. However, the club did not achieve good results and decided to return to the Hong Kong Third Division at the end of the season.

=== Citizen ===
Tam Lok Hin signed for Citizen in 2009.

He was used as a substitute in the 2010–11 Hong Kong Senior Shield final and scored with a header to make it 3–3 between Citizen and South China. Citizen went on to win the game on penalty shootout.

=== Lee Man ===
On 21 May 2018, Lee Man announced that they had signed Tam.

On 2 June 2020, Tam was named on a list of departures from the club. However, on 3 September 2020, Tam was brought back by the club on a short-term deal until the end of the 2019–20 season. His contract was further expanded for the 2020–21 season.

== International career ==
Tam Lok Hin was a member of the Hong Kong U-19. He scored 2 goals in AFC U-19 Championship qualifying match against Singapore on 9 November 2009.

3 January 2016, Tam scored a goal for Hong Kong in 38th Guangdong–Hong Kong Cup.

== Honours ==
Citizen

- Hong Kong Senior Shield: 2010–11

Yuen Long

- Hong Kong Senior Shield: 2017–18

Lee Man

- Hong Kong Sapling Cup: 2018–19

== Career statistics ==
=== Club ===
As of 11 June 2012

Club	Season	League		Senior Shield		FA Cup		League Cup		Asia		Total	
Club	Season	Apps	Goals	Apps	Goals	Apps	Goals	Apps	Goals	Apps	Goals	Apps	Goals
Workable	2007–08	1	0	0	0	0	0	1	0	0	0	2	0
Workable Total		1	0	0	0	0	0	1	0	0	0	2	0
Eastern	2008–09	13	3	1	0	0	0	0	0	5	0	19	3
Eastern Total		13	3	1	0	0	0	0	0	5	0	19	3
Citizen	2009–10	10	0	0	0	1	0	–	–	–	–	11	0
Citizen	2010–11	15	0	3	1	1	0	1	0	–	–	20	1
Citizen	2011–12	11	3	0	0	1	0	2	0	6	1	20	4
Citizen Total		36	3	3	1	3	0	3	0	6	1	51	5
Career Total		50	6	4	1	3	0	4	0	11	1	72	8

=== International ===
==== Hong Kong U-21 ====
As of 1 February 2011

#	Date	Venue	Opponent	Result	Scored	Competition
1	7 November 2009	Si Jalak Harupat Stadium, Bandung	Australia	1–3	0	2010 AFC U-19 Championship qualification
2	9 November 2009	Si Jalak Harupat Stadium, Bandung	Singapore	2–2	2	2010 AFC U-19 Championship qualification
3	12 November 2009	Si Jalak Harupat Stadium, Bandung	Japan	0–3	0	2010 AFC U-19 Championship qualification
4	14 November 2009	Si Jalak Harupat Stadium, Bandung	Chinese Taipei	3–2	2	2010 AFC U-19 Championship qualification

==== Hong Kong ====
As of 18 November 2010

#	Date	Venue	Opponent	Result	Scored	Competition
1	9 October 2010	Kaohsiung National Stadium, Kaohsiung	Philippines	4–2	0	2010 Long Teng Cup
2	10 October 2010	Kaohsiung National Stadium, Kaohsiung	Macau	4–0	1	2010 Long Teng Cup
3	12 October 2010	Kaohsiung National Stadium, Kaohsiung	Chinese Taipei	1–1	0	2010 Long Teng Cup

==== Hong Kong U-23 ====
As of 3 July 2012

#	Date	Venue	Opponent	Result	Scored	Competition
1	20 June 2010	Estádio Campo Desportivo, Macau	Macau	5–1	0	2010 Hong Kong–Macau Interport
	28 September 2010	Sai Tso Wan Recreation Ground, Hong Kong	Australia	2–2	0	Friendly
2	24 January 2011	So Kon Po Recreation Ground, Hong Kong	Chinese Taipei	4–0	2	Friendly
3	9 February 2011	Po Kong Village Park, Hong Kong	Indonesia	1–4	0	Friendly
4	23 February 2011	Hong Kong Stadium, Hong Kong	Maldives	4–0	0	2012 AFC Men's Pre-Olympic Tournament
5	9 March 2011	Rasmee Dhandu Stadium, Malé, Maldives	Maldives	3–0	0	2012 AFC Men's Pre-Olympic Tournament
6	12 June 2011	Xianghe Sports Center, Beijing	United Arab Emirates	0–2	0	Friendly
7	16 June 2012	Estádio Campo Desportivo, Macau	Macau	3–1	0	2012 Hong Kong–Macau Interport
8	23 June 2012	Chao Anouvong Stadium, Vientiane, Laos	Cambodia	2–3	0	2013 AFC U-22 Championship qualification
9	25 June 2012	Laos National Stadium, Vientiane, Laos	China	1–5	0	2013 AFC U-22 Championship qualification
10	28 June 2012	Chao Anouvong Stadium, Vientiane, Laos	North Korea	0–1	0	2013 AFC U-22 Championship qualification
11	30 June 2012	Laos National Stadium, Vientiane, Laos	Laos	0–2	0	2013 AFC U-22 Championship qualification
12	3 July 2012	Chao Anouvong Stadium, Vientiane, Laos	Thailand	0–4	0	2013 AFC U-22 Championship qualification

Sporting positions
Preceded by Yapp Hung Fai	Hong Kong national under-23 football team captain 2012–	Succeeded by Incumbent
