= Lo Chih-en =

Taiwanese footballer

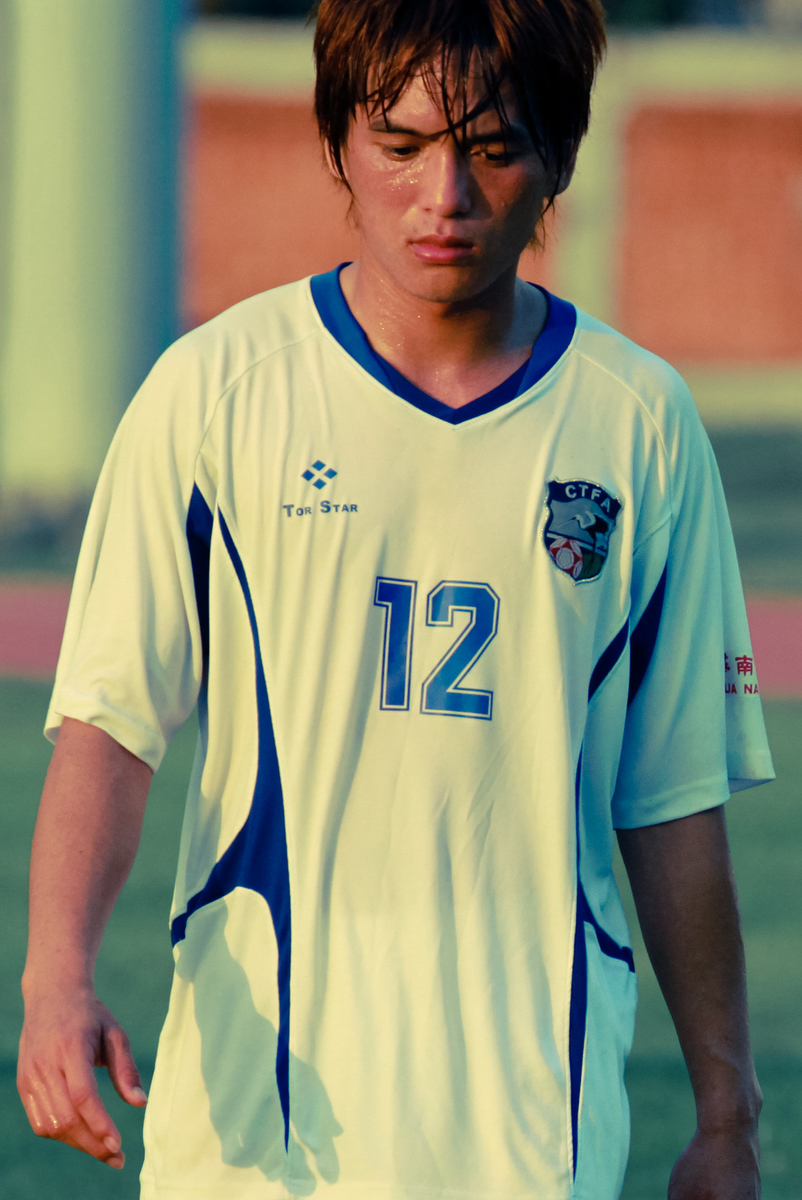

Personal information
- Date of birth: December 28, 1988 (age 37)
- Place of birth: Yilan, Republic of China (Taiwan)
- Position: Striker

Team information
- Current team: Tatung F.C.
- Number: 25

Youth career
- 2003–2006: Yilan

Senior career*
Years	Team	Apps	(Gls)
2008	E-United		
2017–	Tatung F.C.		

International career
2007–present	Chinese Taipei	12	(7)
2009–present	Chinese Taipei futsal		
- * Club domestic league appearances and goals

Lo Chih-en (Chinese: 羅志恩; pinyin: Luó Zhì'ēn; born 28 December 1988) is a Taiwanese football player. He comes from Atayal tribe. On 17 June 2007, Lo made his debut for Chinese Taipei in the game against Guam of East Asian Cup 2008 preliminary competition, in which he scored 4 goals to help Chinese Taipei's 10-0 victory. His twin brother, Lo Chih-an, is also a footballer. Both of them currently study in National Pingtung University of Education.

In 2009, Lo received futsal training and was called up to present Chinese Taipei in the 2010 AFC Futsal Championship.

== International goals ==
No.	Date	Venue	Opponent	Score	Result	Competition
1.	17 June 2007	Estádio Campo Desportivo, Taipa, Macau	Guam	1–0	10–0	2008 East Asian Football Championship
2.	17 June 2007	Estádio Campo Desportivo, Taipa, Macau	Guam	4–0	10–0	2008 East Asian Football Championship
3.	17 June 2007	Estádio Campo Desportivo, Taipa, Macau	Guam	8–0	10–0	2008 East Asian Football Championship
4.	17 June 2007	Estádio Campo Desportivo, Taipa, Macau	Guam	10–0	10–0	2008 East Asian Football Championship
5.	24 June 2007	Estádio Campo Desportivo, Taipa, Macau	Macau	5–1	7–2	2008 East Asian Football Championship
6.	24 June 2007	Estádio Campo Desportivo, Taipa, Macau	Macau	7–2	7–2	2008 East Asian Football Championship
7.	25 August 2009	National Stadium, Kaohsiung, Taiwan	Guam	4–2	4–2	2010 East Asian Football Championship
8.	9 October 2010	National Stadium, Kaohsiung, Taiwan	Macau	2–0	7–1	2010 Long Teng Cup
9.	25 September 2012	Rizal Memorial Stadium, Manila, Philippines	Macau	1–1	2–2	2012 Philippine Peace Cup

== Honours and awards ==
- Intercity Football League Golden Boot (2007)
