= Ian Araneta =

Filipino footballer

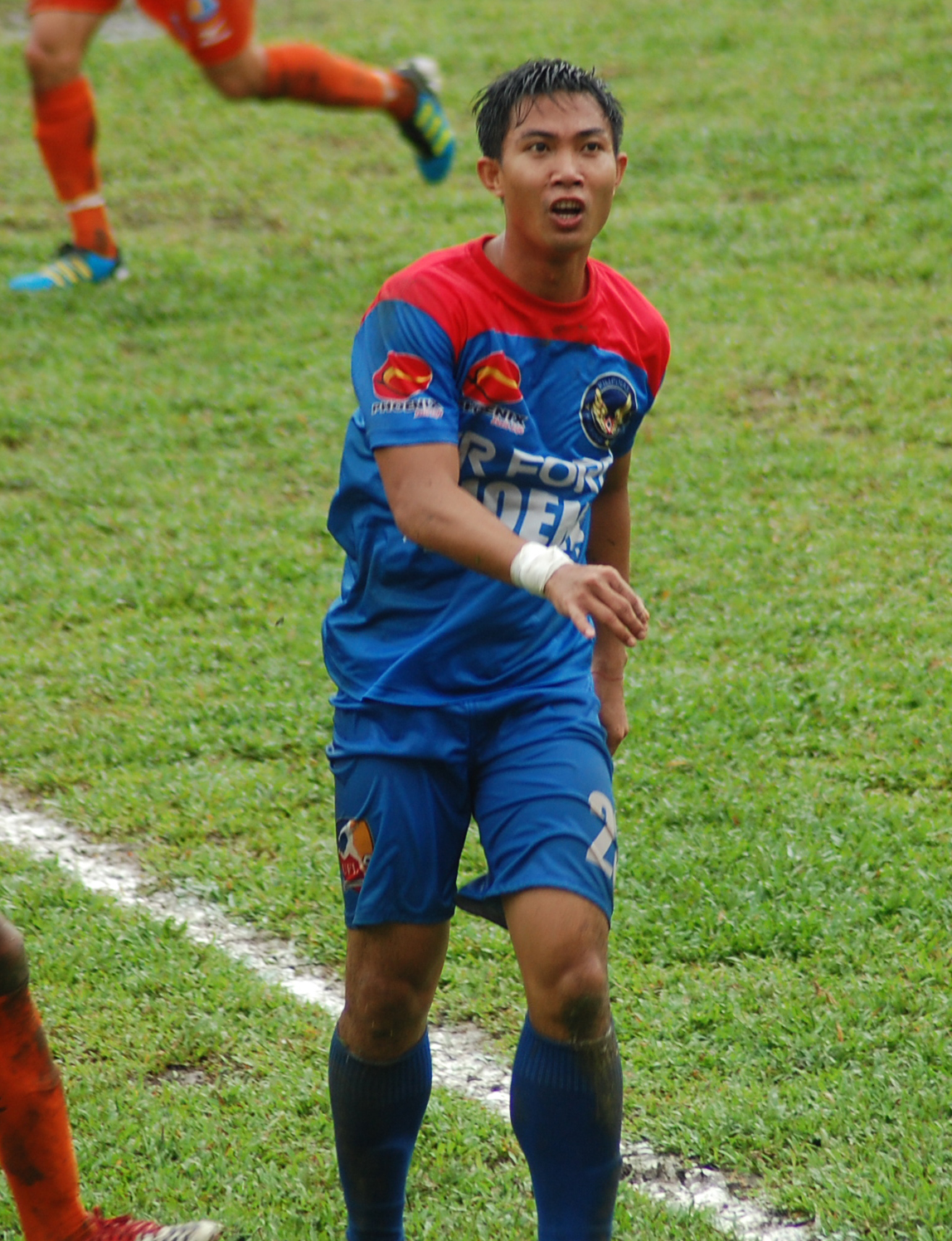
- Araneta playing a match against Loyola Agila FC

Personal information
- Full name: Ian Bayona Araneta
- Date of birth: March 2, 1982 (age 44)
- Place of birth: Barotac Nuevo, Philippines
- Height: 1.77 m (5 ft 10 in)
- Position: Forward

Senior career*
Years	Team	Apps	(Gls)
2003–2014	Philippine Air Force	98	(50)
2015	→Stallion (loan)	0	(0)

International career
2002–2013	Philippines	47	(9)
2005	Philippines U-23		
- * Club domestic league appearances and goals

Ian Bayona Araneta (born March 2, 1982) is a Filipino former professional footballer who played as a forward.

He played for the Philippines national team from 2002 to 2013, scoring nine goals.

== Club career ==
While still in his home town of Barotac Nuevo, Iloilo, he was scouted by both the Army and the Air Force teams but eventually chose the Philippine Air Force where he would train and be on duty while also getting the chance to continue playing football.

As a player of the Air Force football club, he is also enlisted in the Philippine Air Force.

== International career ==
Araneta made his international debut on December 11, 2002, in a friendly match against Singapore prior to the Tiger Cup.

He scored his first international goal six years after making his debut in a 2008 AFF Suzuki Cup qualification match against Laos. He scored the opening goal but the Philippines failed to win, losing 1–2.

On October 12, 2010, Araneta scored his first international hat trick against Macau in the 2010 Long Teng Cup, which the Philippines eventually won 5–0. He ended up as the tournament's top scorer with four goals.

=== International goals ===
Scores and results list the Philippines' goal tally first.

#	Date	Venue	Opponent	Score	Result	Competition
1.	October 21, 2008	Phnom Penh National Olympic Stadium, Cambodia	Laos	1–0	1–2	2008 AFF Suzuki Cup qualifier
2.	October 10, 2010	Kaohsiung National Stadium, Kaohsiung, Taiwan	Chinese Taipei	1–1	1–1	2010 Long Teng Cup
3.	October 12, 2010	Kaohsiung National Stadium, Kaohsiung, Taiwan	Macau	2–0	5–0	2010 Long Teng Cup
4.	October 12, 2010	Kaohsiung National Stadium, Kaohsiung, Taiwan	Macau	4–0	5–0	2010 Long Teng Cup
5.	October 12, 2010	Kaohsiung National Stadium, Kaohsiung, Taiwan	Macau	5–0	5–0	2010 Long Teng Cup
6.	October 22, 2010	New Laos National Stadium, Vientiane, Laos	Timor-Leste	1–0	5–0	2010 AFF Championship qualification
7.	October 22, 2010	New Laos National Stadium, Vientiane, Laos	Timor-Leste	4–0	5–0	2010 AFF Championship qualification
8.	October 22, 2010	New Laos National Stadium, Vientiane, Laos	Timor-Leste	5–0	5–0	2010 AFF Championship qualification
9.	March 25, 2011	Bogyoke Aung San Stadium, Yangon, Myanmar	Bangladesh	1–0	3–0	2012 AFC Challenge Cup qualification

== Honours ==
=== Club ===
Philippine Air Force FC

- UFL Cup: 2009, 2011

=== National team ===
- Philippine Peace Cup: 2012
- AFC Challenge Cup: Third 2012

=== Individual ===
- Long Teng Cup Golden Boot: 1

2010
