= Lin Cheng-yi (footballer) =

Taiwanese footballer (born 1987)

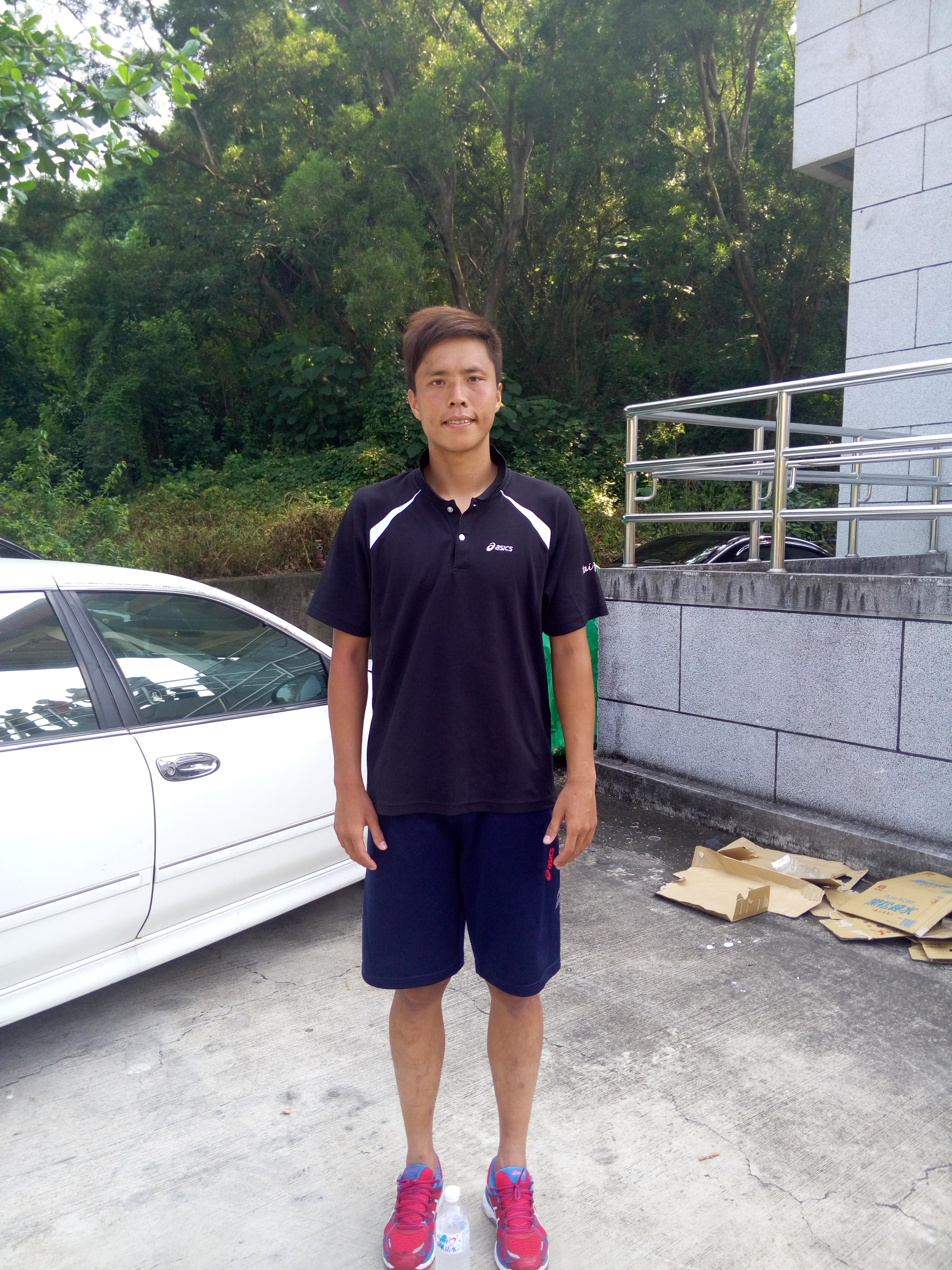

Personal information
- Full name: Lin Cheng-yi
- Date of birth: 30 September 1987 (age 39)
- Place of birth: Hualien, Taiwan
- Height: 1.87 m (6 ft 2 in)
- Position: Defender

Senior career*
Years	Team	Apps	(Gls)
2009	Kaohsiung Yaoti		
2010	Taiwan PE College		
2011	Taipei City Tatung		
2012–	Kaohsiung County Taipower		

International career^{‡}
2009–	Chinese Taipei	18	(2)
- * Club domestic league appearances and goals ‡ National team caps and goals as of 9 January 2013

Lin Cheng-yi (born 30 September 1987) is a Taiwanese international footballer who plays as a defender for Kaohsiung County Taipower and the Taiwan national team.
