= Lam Hok Hei =

Hong Kong footballer (born 1991)

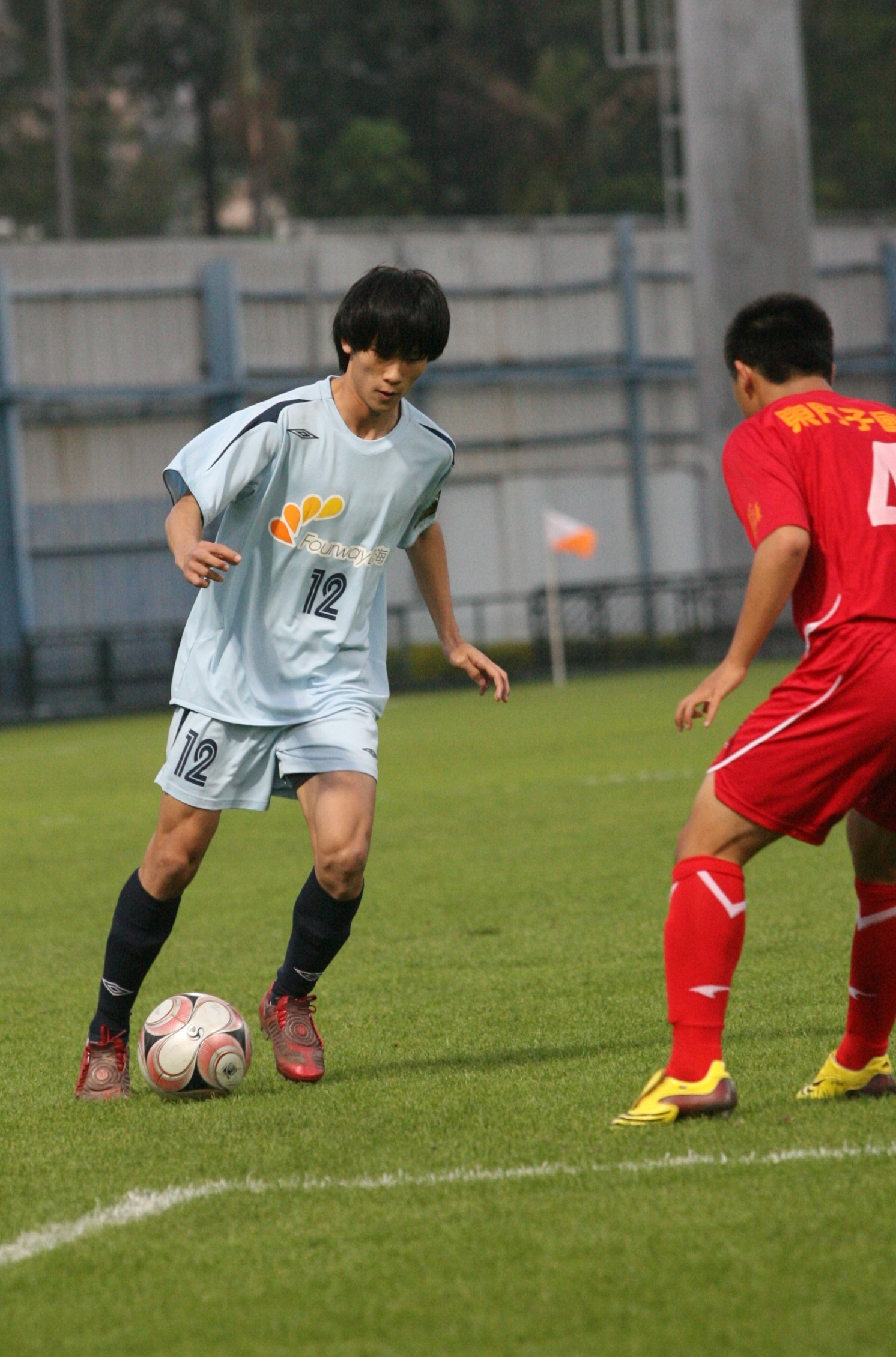

Personal information
- Full name: Lam Hok Hei
- Date of birth: 18 September 1991 (age 35)
- Place of birth: Hong Kong
- Height: 1.81 m (5 ft 11 in)
- Position: Forward

Team information
- Current team: Sha Tin
- Number: 8

Youth career
- 2007–2008: Hong Kong 09

Senior career*
Years	Team	Apps	(Gls)
2008–2015	Rangers (HKG)	108	(20)
2013	→ Persija Jakarta (loan)	5	(0)
2015–2017	South China	28	(1)
2017–2020	Eastern	13	(0)
2019–2020	→ Rangers (HKG) (loan)	7	(0)
2020–2021	Rangers (HKG)	17	(4)
2021–2022	Tsuen Wan	10	(15)
2022–2023	Rangers (HKG)	11	(1)
2023–2024	HK U23	20	(7)
2024–2025	Kowloon City	23	(5)
2025–2026	Supreme	26	(34)
2026–	Sha Tin	7	(1)

International career^{‡}
2008–2009	Hong Kong U-17		
2008–2009	Hong Kong U-20		
2009–2010	Hong Kong U-23	17	(3)
2010–2015	Hong Kong	11	(3)
- * Club domestic league appearances and goals as of 22 November 2026 ‡ National team caps and goals as of 28 May 2017

Lam Hok Hei (Chinese: 林學曦; Jyutping: lam^{4} hok^{6} hei^{1}; born 18 September 1991) is a Hong Kong professional footballer who currently plays as a forward for Hong Kong Premier League club Sha Tin.

== Club career ==
=== Rangers ===
Lam started his professional football career in Hong Kong 09. In 2008, he signed for Rangers. He quickly established himself as a regular first team member. In January 2013, Rangers' manager Philip Lee said that he would let Lam make the decision about his own future.

=== Persija Jakarta ===
On 18 May 2013, Lam announced that he had joined Indonesia Super League club Persija Jakarta for a four-month loan contract.

On 26 May 2013, Lam made his line-up debut for Persija Jakarta against Persidafon Dafonsoro, and he played for about 70 minutes before being injured. Persija Jakarta won, 1–0.

On 1 June 2013, Lam made his second appearance, against Persiwa Wamena; in this match, Lam made his first assist, on a goal by Rachmat Afandi, and Persija Jakarta won, 3–0.

=== South China ===
On 21 January 2015, Lam joined South China.

Lam scored his first goal for South China in the 2015 AFC Cup.

=== Eastern ===
Following Eastern's 2016–17 season playoff win, chairman Peter Leung announced that the club had signed Lam from South China.

=== Rangers ===
On 23 September 2019, Lam was loaned to Rangers for a season. He officially joined the club after the end of the 2019–20 season.

Lam was in good form at the start of the 2020–21 season, scoring 4 goals in 7 appearances, including 1 league goal and 3 cup goals.

On 4 August 2022, Lam returned to Rangers.

=== HK U23 ===
On 5 July 2023, Lam joined HK U23.

=== Kowloon City ===
On 18 July 2024, Lam joined Kowloon City.

=== Sha Tin ===
On 8 August 2026, Lam returned to top-flight and joined Sha Tin.

== International career ==
On 9 October 2010, Lam made his international debut for Hong Kong in a Long Teng Cup match against Philippines.

On 14 November 2012, Lam scored his first international goal for Hong Kong in a friendly match against Malaysia at the Shah Alam Stadium. The game ended 1–1.

== Career statistics ==
=== Club ===
As of 31 May 2014

Club performance			League		Cup		League Cup		Continental		Total	
Season	Club	League	Apps	Goals	Apps	Goals	Apps	Goals	Apps	Goals	Apps	Goals
Hong Kong			League		FA Cup & Shield		League Cup		Asia		Total	
2007–08	Hong Kong 09	Reserves	15	7	-						15	7
2008–09	Fourway	First Division	19	2	6	1	2	1	-		27	4
2009–10	Fourway Rangers	First Division	17	1	3	0	-	-	-		20	1
2010–11	Fourway Rangers	First Division	18	2	3	0	2	0	-		23	2
2011–12	Biu Chun Rangers	First Division	14	5	3	1	0	0	-		17	6
2012–13	Biu Chun Rangers	First Division	17	6	1	0	2	0	-		19	6
2013–14	Biu Chun Rangers	First Division	18	4	2	1	3	0	-		23	5
Total	Hong Kong		118	27	18	3	9	1	-		145	31
2013	Persija Jakarta	Indonesia Super League	5	0	0	0	0	0	-		5	0
Total	Indonesia		5	0	0	0	0	0	-		5	0
Career total			123	27	18	3	9	1	-		150	31

=== International ===
As of 28 March 2015

Hong Kong appearances and goals
#	Date	Venue	Opponent	Result	Scored	Competition
1	9 October 2010	Kaohsiung National Stadium, Kaohsiung	Philippines	4–2	0	2010 Long Teng Cup
2	10 October 2010	Kaohsiung National Stadium, Kaohsiung	Macau	4–0	2	2010 Long Teng Cup
3	12 October 2010	Kaohsiung National Stadium, Kaohsiung	Chinese Taipei	1–1	0	2010 Long Teng Cup
4	15 August 2012	Jurong West Stadium, Singapore	Singapore	0–2	0	Friendly
5	16 October 2012	Mong Kok Stadium, Mong Kok, Kowloon	Malaysia	0–3	0	Friendly
6	14 November 2012	Shah Alam Stadium, Shah Alam, Malaysia	Malaysia	1–1	1	Friendly
7	1 December 2012	Mong Kok Stadium, Mong Kok, Hong Kong	Guam	2–1	0	2013 EAFF East Asian Cup Preliminary Competition Round 2
8	3 December 2012	Mong Kok Stadium, Mong Kok, Hong Kong	Australia	0–1	0	2013 EAFF East Asian Cup Preliminary Competition Round 2
9	6 February 2013	Pakhtakor Stadium, Uzbekistan	Uzbekistan	0–0	0	2015 AFC Asian Cup qualification
10	5 March 2014	Mỹ Đình National Stadium, Hanoi, Vietnam	Vietnam	1–3	0	2015 AFC Asian Cup qualification
11	28 March 2015	Mong Kok Stadium, Mong Kok, Hong Kong	Guam	1–0	0	Friendly

Awards
Preceded by James Ha; To Hon To	Hong Kong Top Footballer Awards Best Youth Player with Lau Cheuk Hin; 2011–12	Succeeded by Yapp Hung Fai; Lam Hok Hei
Preceded by Lau Cheuk Hin; Lam Hok Hei	Hong Kong Top Footballer Awards Best Youth Player; 2012–13 with Yapp Hung Fai	Succeeded by Incumbent
