= Lo Chih-an =

Taiwanese footballer

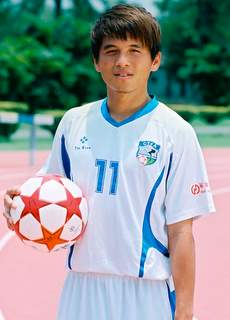

Personal information
- Date of birth: 28 December 1988 (age 37)
- Place of birth: Yilan, Taiwan
- Height: 1.65 m (5 ft 5 in)
- Positions: Midfielder; striker

Team information
- Current team: Tatung F.C.
- Number: 35

Youth career
- 2003–2006: Yilan

Senior career*
Years	Team	Apps	(Gls)
2008	E-United		
2009	Yilan		
2010	NTCPE F.C.		
2011–	Tatung F.C.		

International career^{‡}
2007–	Chinese Taipei	34	(7)
2009–	Chinese Taipei futsal		
- * Club domestic league appearances and goals ‡ National team caps and goals as of 22 June 2013

Lo Chih-an (Chinese: 羅志安; pinyin: Luó Zhì'ān; born 28 December 1988) is a Taiwanese football player who comes from Atayal tribe. Despite still being a high school student, Lo made his debut for Chinese Taipei national football team, together with his brother Lo Chih-en, and assisted the latter's first goal in the game against Guam of East Asian Cup 2008 preliminary competition on 17 June 2007.

In 2009, Lo and his twin brother Lo Chih-en received futsal training and were both called up to present Chinese Taipei in the 2010 AFC Futsal Championship.

== International goals ==
Scores and results list the Chinese Taipei's goal tally first.

#	Date	Venue	Opponent	Score	Result	Competition
1.	10 October 2010	Kaoshiung	Philippines	1–0	1–1	2010 Long Teng Cup
2.	27 September 2012	Manila	Guam	1–0	2–0	2012 Philippine Peace Cup
3.	5 December 2012	Hong Kong Stadium, Hong Kong	Guam	1–1	1–1	2013 EAFF East Asian Cup
