= National Stadium (Kaohsiung) =

Stadium in Zuoying, Kaohsiung, Taiwan

Coordinates: 22°42′10″N 120°17′42″E

National Stadium 國家體育場
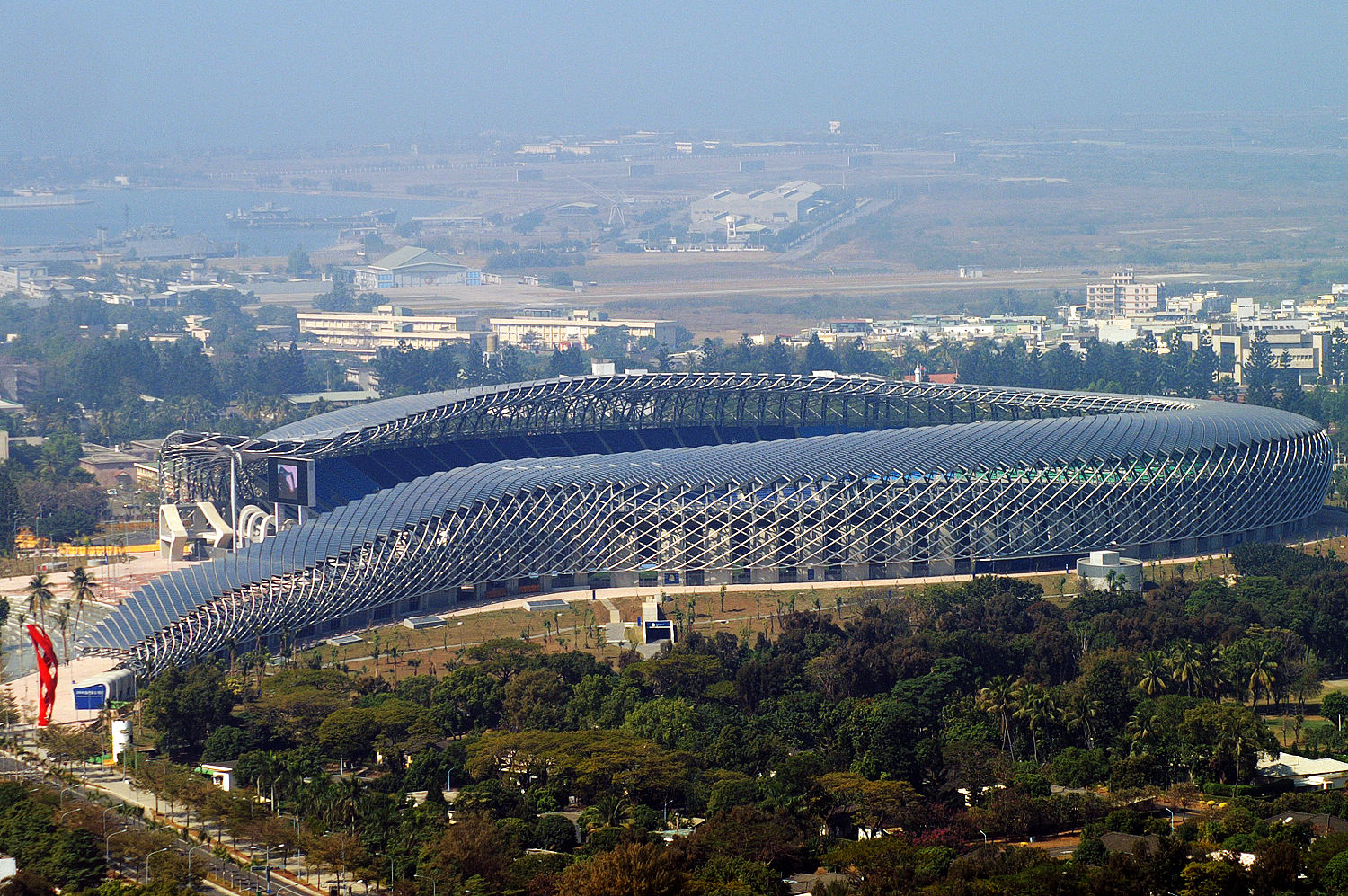
- Interactive map of National Stadium 國家體育場
- Address: 100 Olympics Ave, Zuoying District, Kaohsiung, Taiwan
- Owner: Kaohsiung City Government
- Capacity: 55,000
- Surface: Grass

Construction
- Opened: May 2009
- Architect: Toyo Ito

Tenants
- Taipower; Tatung; Chinese Taipei national football team Chinese Taipei national rugby union team

Website
- www.nssac.gov.tw

National Stadium
- Chinese: 國家體育場
Transcriptions
Standard Mandarin
- Hanyu Pinyin: Guójiā tǐyùchǎng
- Tongyong Pinyin: Guójiā tǐyùhchǎng
- IPA: [kwǒtɕjá tʰìŷʈʂʰàŋ]
Southern Min
- Hokkien POJ: Kok-ka Thé-io̍k-tiûⁿ

Alternative Chinese name
- Chinese: 龍騰體育場
Transcriptions
Standard Mandarin
- Hanyu Pinyin: Lóngténg tǐyùchǎng
- Tongyong Pinyin: Lóngténg tǐyùhchǎng
- IPA: [lʊ̌ŋtʰə̌ŋ tʰìŷʈʂʰàŋ]
Southern Min
- Hokkien POJ: Lêng-thêng Thé-io̍k-tiûⁿ

The National Stadium (Chinese: 國家體育場; pinyin: Guójiā Tǐyùchǎng; also named 龍騰體育場), formerly known as the World Games Stadium, is a multi-purpose stadium in Zuoying District, Kaohsiung, Taiwan. It is currently the largest stadium in Taiwan in terms of capacity.

Completed in 2009, it is used mostly for football matches and it hosted the main events for the 2009 World Games. The stadium has a capacity of 55,000 people. Since the conclusion of the games, the stadium has been used for selected Chinese Taipei national football team matches including FIFA World Cup qualifiers.

The stadium, designed by Japanese architect Toyo Ito, makes use of 1 MW of solar cells to provide most of its power needs. The stadium's semi spiral-shaped, like a dragon, is the first stadium in the world to provide power using solar power technology. The solar panels covering the vast external face of the stadium are able to generate most of the power required for its own operation, as well as additional power that can be sent to the grid.

== Transportation ==
The stadium is accessible within walking distance West from World Games Station of the Kaohsiung MRT.

== Events ==
=== Sports ===
List of sporting events in National Stadium (Kaohsiung)
Date	Tournament	Event	Attendance
16 July 2009	2009 World Games	Opening Ceremony	30,000
19-21 July 2009	2009 World Games	Flying disc	-
24-25 July 2009	2009 World Games	Rugby sevens	-
26 July 2009	2009 World Games	Closing Ceremony	21,000
23-27 August 2009	2010 East Asian Football Championship	Preliminary Round 2 matches	33,100
16 January 2010	Friendlies	Chinese Taipei v.s. Philippines	-
17 January 2010	Friendlies	Taipei PE College (Chinese Taipei) v.s. Philippines	-
8-12 October 2010	2010 Long Teng Cup	All matches	7,440
10 February 2011	2012 AFC Challenge Cup qualification	Play-off round Chinese Taipei v.s. Laos	1,000
18-27 March 2011	Football at the 2012 Summer Olympics – Women's tournament	Women's Asian Qualifiers Group A matches	4,143
19-25 September 2011	2011 AFC President's Cup	Finals	7,758
30 September - 4 October 2011	2011 Long Teng Cup	All matches	-
12 March 2015	2018 FIFA World Cup qualification	AFC first round Chinese Taipei v.s. Brunei	6,273
27-31 March 2015	2016 AFC U-23 Championship qualification	Group F matches	12,285
17 November 2015	2018 FIFA World Cup qualification	AFC second round Group F Chinese Taipei v.s. Iraq	11,960
2 June 2016	2019 AFC Asian Cup qualification	Play-off round Chinese Taipei v.s. Cambodia	3,564
8, 11 October 2016	2019 AFC Asian Cup qualification	Play-off round Chinese Taipei v.s. Timor-Leste	3,849
18 November 2017	2017 Taiwan Football Premier League	Final and 3rd Place Playoff	-
15 October 2019	2022 FIFA World Cup qualification	AFC second round Group B Chinese Taipei v.s. Australia	3,251
2-10 November 2019	2020 AFC U-19 Championship qualification	Group H matches	1,251
8 September 2023	Friendlies	Chinese Taipei v.s. Philippines	-
12, 17 October 2023	2026 FIFA World Cup qualification	AFC first round Chinese Taipei v.s. Timor-Leste	2,639

=== Concerts ===
List of music events in National Stadium (Kaohsiung)
Date	Performer(s)	Tour/Event	Attendance
2009 - 2022
20 May 2009	Pittsburgh Symphony Orchestra, Vienna State Opera Chorus, Taiwan National Choir, NSYSU Music Department Choir, KMU Singers	Main Stadium Inauguration Concert The World Games Concert 2009	-
5 December 2009	Mayday	DNA World Tour	55,555
30 January 2010	Rain	The Legend of Rainism Asia Tour	30,000
12 November 2011	Jody Chiang, Fei Yu-ching, A-Mei, Elva Hsiao, Show Lo, Harlem Yu, Sodagreen	Hear the future • Dream a hundred	-
8, 9 December 2012	A-mei	AmeiZing World Tour Live	100,000
21, 22, 30, 31 December 2012	Mayday	Nowhere World Tour	200,000
31 December 2013 & 1 January 2014	Mayday	Just Rock It World Tour	100,000
31 December 2013 & 2, 3 January 2014	Mayday	Light Up The Hope	150,000
13, 14 August 2016	Mayday	Just Rock It World Tour	110,000
18, 19, 20, 21 March 2017	Mayday	Life Tour	200,000
1 March 2019	Maroon 5	Red Pill Blues Tour	47,669
25, 26, 31 December 2021 & 1 January 2022	Mayday	Fly to 2022	200,000
2023
18, 19 March 2023	Blackpink	Born Pink World Tour	101,096
29, 31 March & 1, 2 April 2023	Mayday	Nowhere World Tour	200,000
11, 12 November 2023	Coldplay	Music of the Spheres World Tour	102,949
2024
3 February 2024	Ed Sheeran	+–=÷× Tour	54,369
23, 24, 29, 30, 31 March 2024	Mayday	#5525 Live Tour	250,000
13 April 2024	(G)I-dle, BSS, NMIXX, ENHYPEN, STAYC, &TEAM, BoyNextDoor, JD1, Zerobaseone, hosted by Choo Young-woo	Golden Wave in Taiwan	57,000
7, 8 September 2024	Bruno Mars	Bruno Mars Live	110,000
21 September 2024	One Ok Rock	Premonition World Tour	50,000
3 November 2024	Stray Kids	Dominate World Tour	40,000
2025
14 February 2025	Maroon 5	Maroon 5 Asia 2025	40,000
12 April 2025	Accusefive	My Magic Tour 2025	50,000
31 May 2025	Monsta X, IVE, Zerobaseone, Izna, KiiiKiii, Mark Tuan, hosted by Ji Chang-wook	All Loud Kt Pop	30,000
18, 19 October 2025	Blackpink	Deadline World Tour	101,096
22, 23 November 2025	TWICE	This Is For World Tour	110,000
6 December 2025	JJ Lin, Yena, Cortis, KickFlip, QWER, Ash Island, Chanmina, Kiss of Life, Nexz, Xikers, AHOF, Meovv, Ateez, Cravity, TWS, Monsta X, AllDay Project, Woodz, KiiiKiii, Riize, Le Sserafim, Stray Kids and Ive	10th Asia Artist Awards	80,000
7 December 2025	Nexz, xikers, Cravity, KiiiKiii, KickFlip, SB19, AHOF, Ash Island, Ateez, Woodz, Yena, Kiss of Life, QWER	ACON 2025	80,000
2026
30 May 2026	G-Dragon、Taeyeon、KiiiKiii、FTIsland、DPR IAN	K-SPARK in Kaohsiung	
19 September 2026	Post Malone	Big Ass Stadium Tour	
31 October 2026	Fujii Kaze	Prema World Tour	
19, 21, 22 November 2026	BTS	Arirang World Tour	
5, 6 December 2026		11th Asia Artist Awards	

== Gallery ==
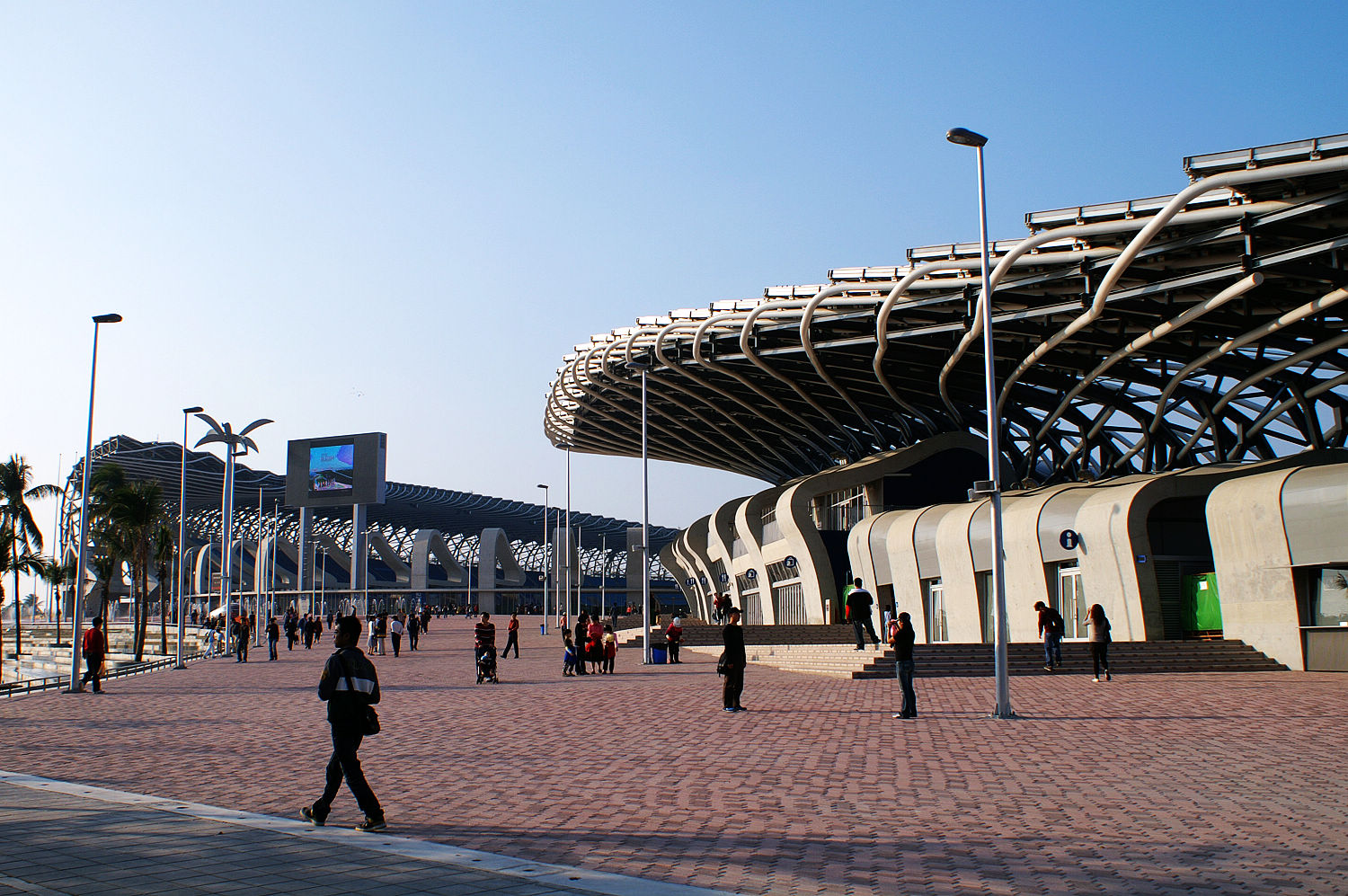
Stadium Plaza

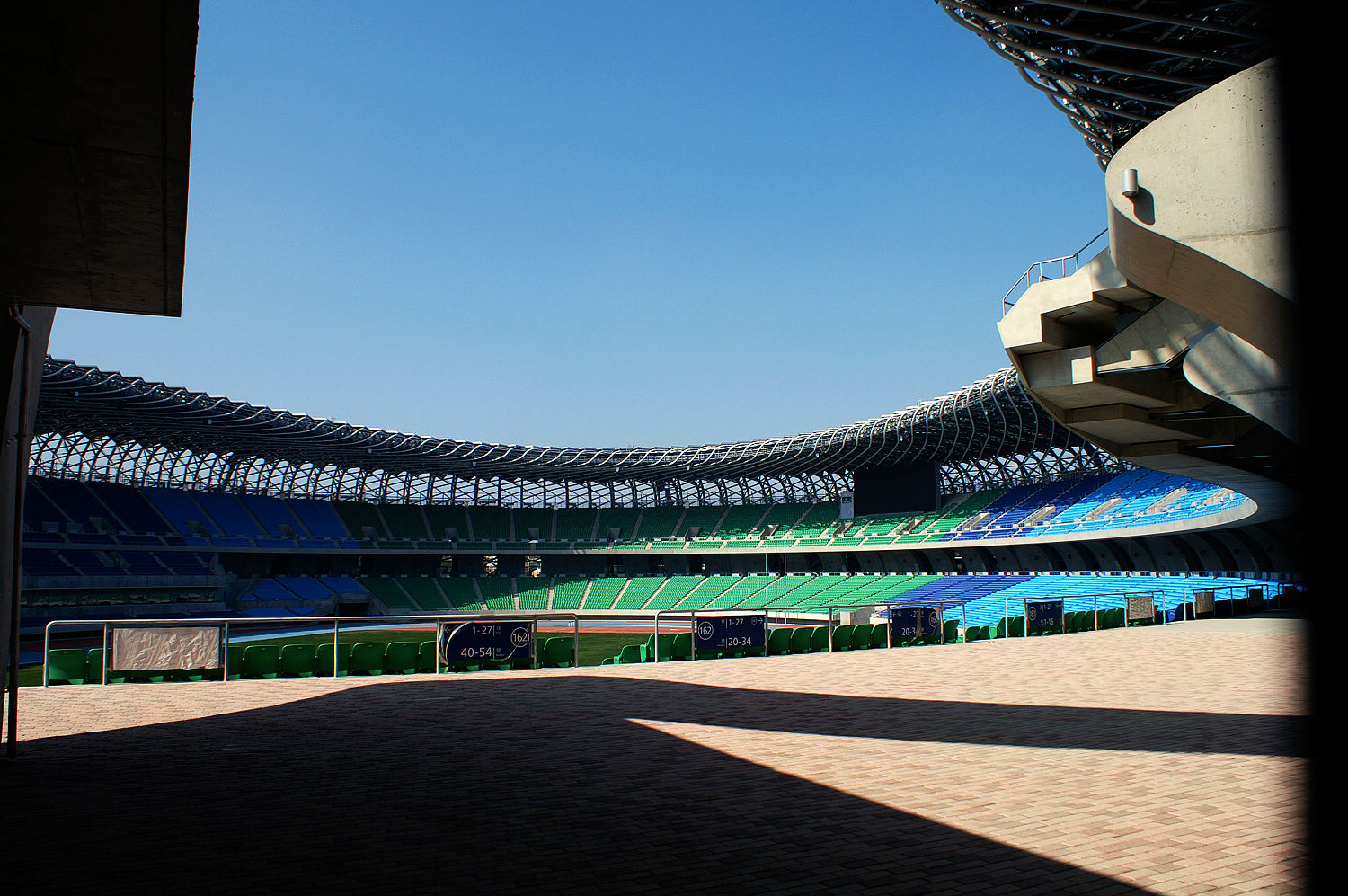
Auditorium

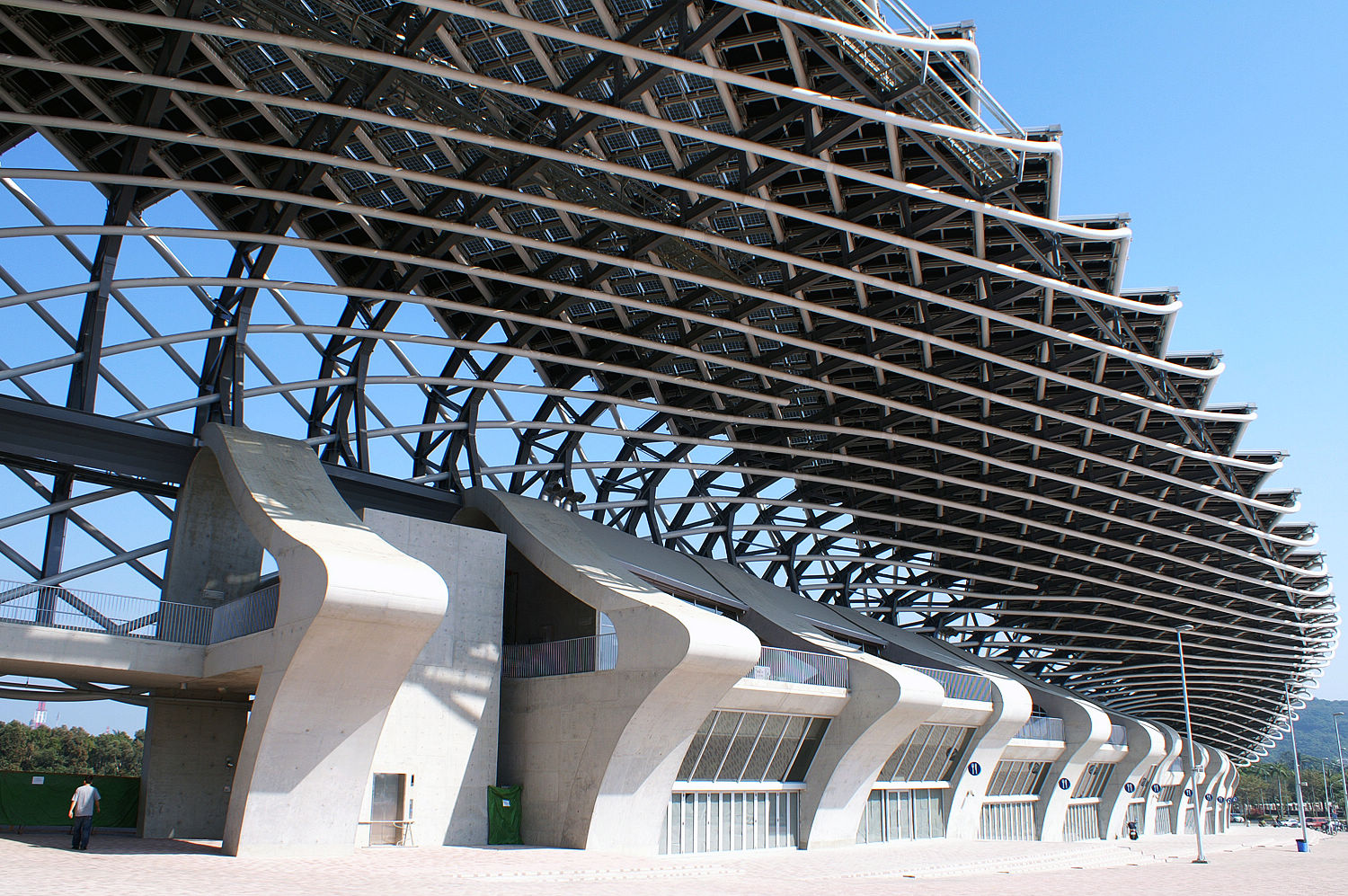
Roof

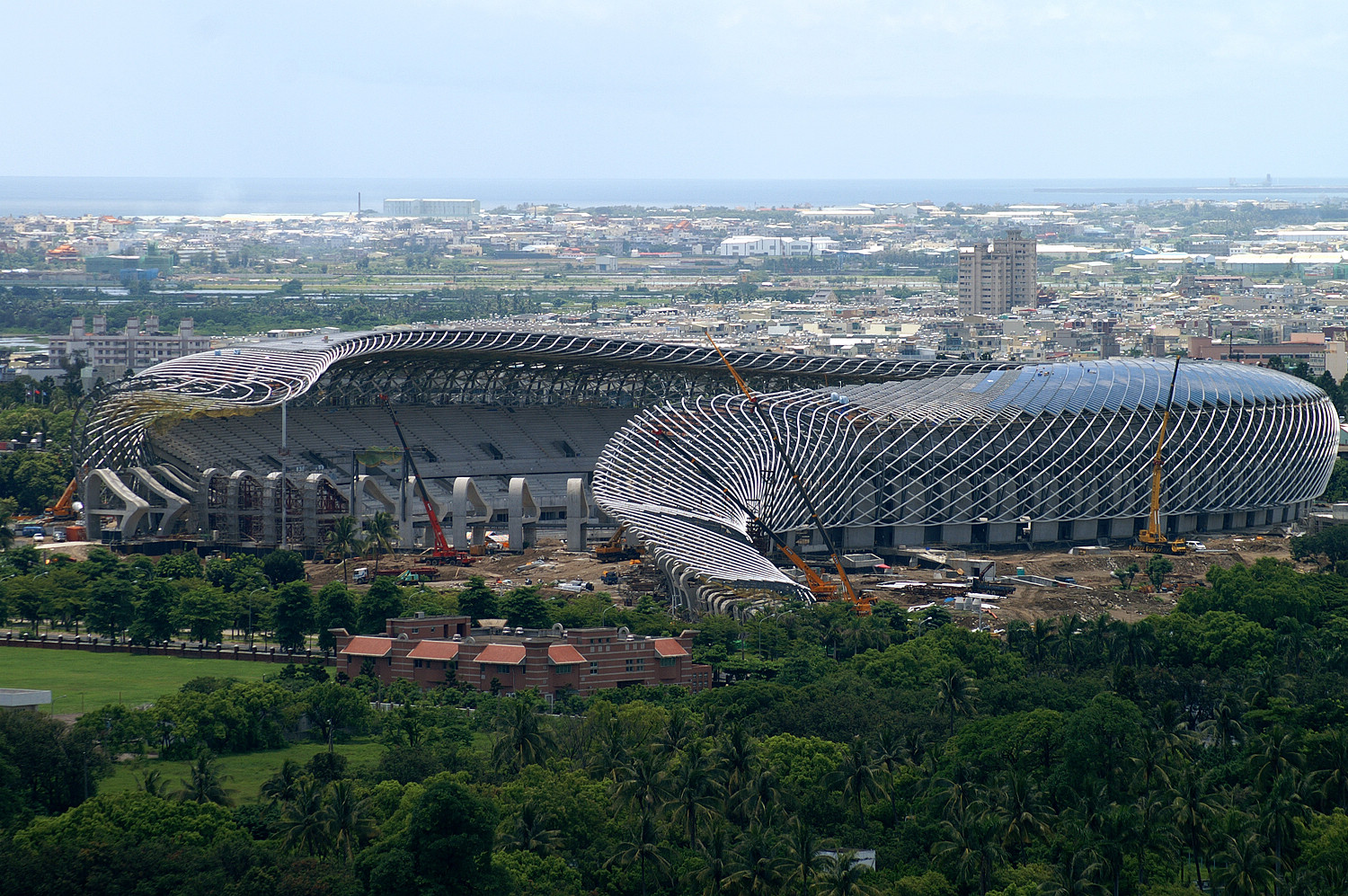
National Stadium under construction

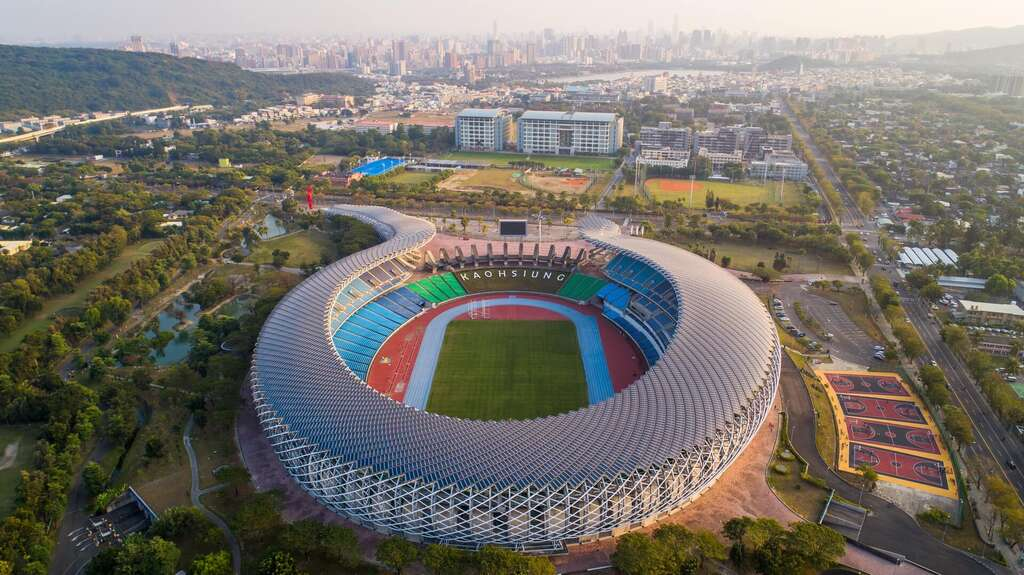
National Stadium and National Sports Training Center

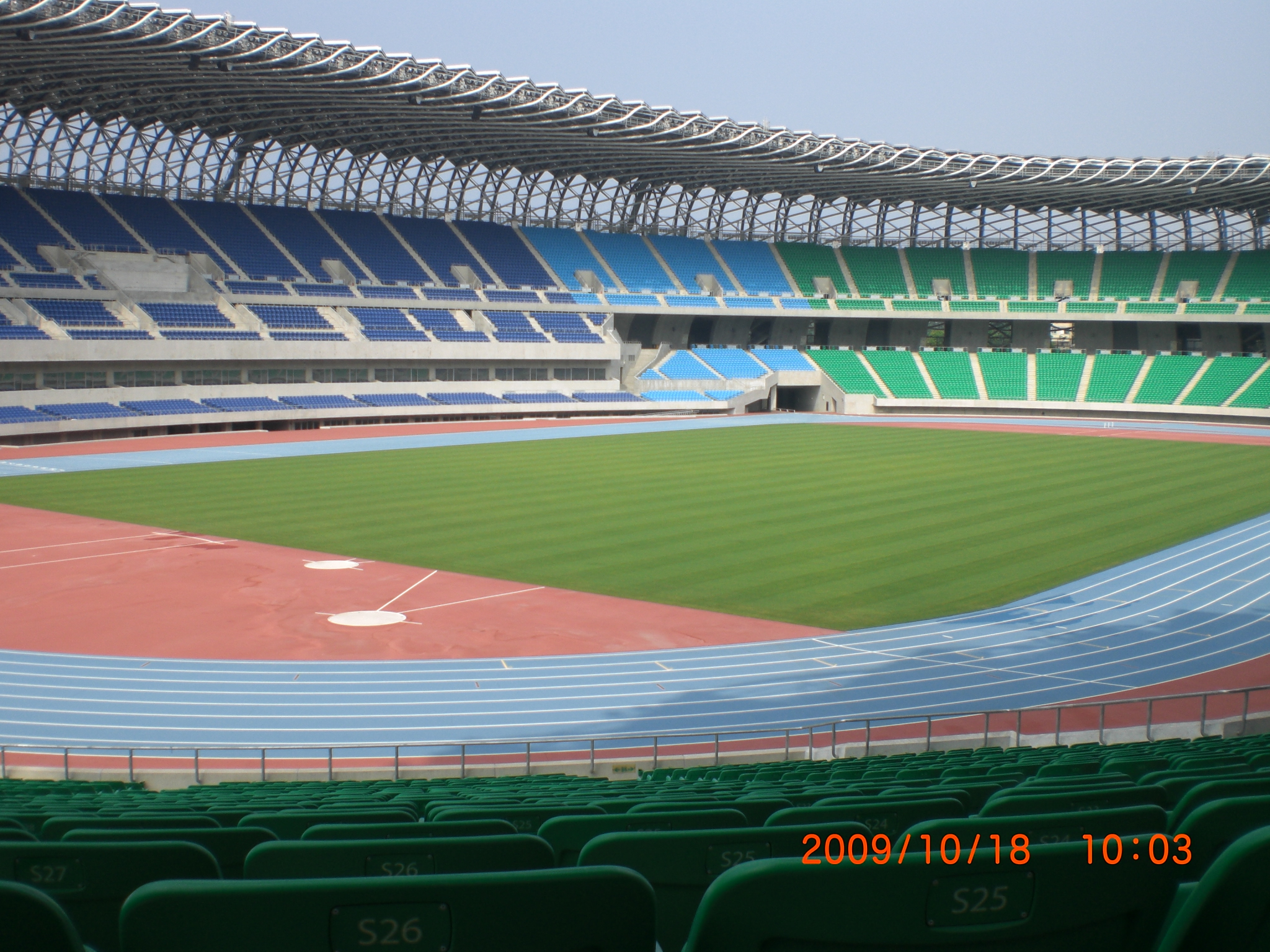
During the 2009 World Games

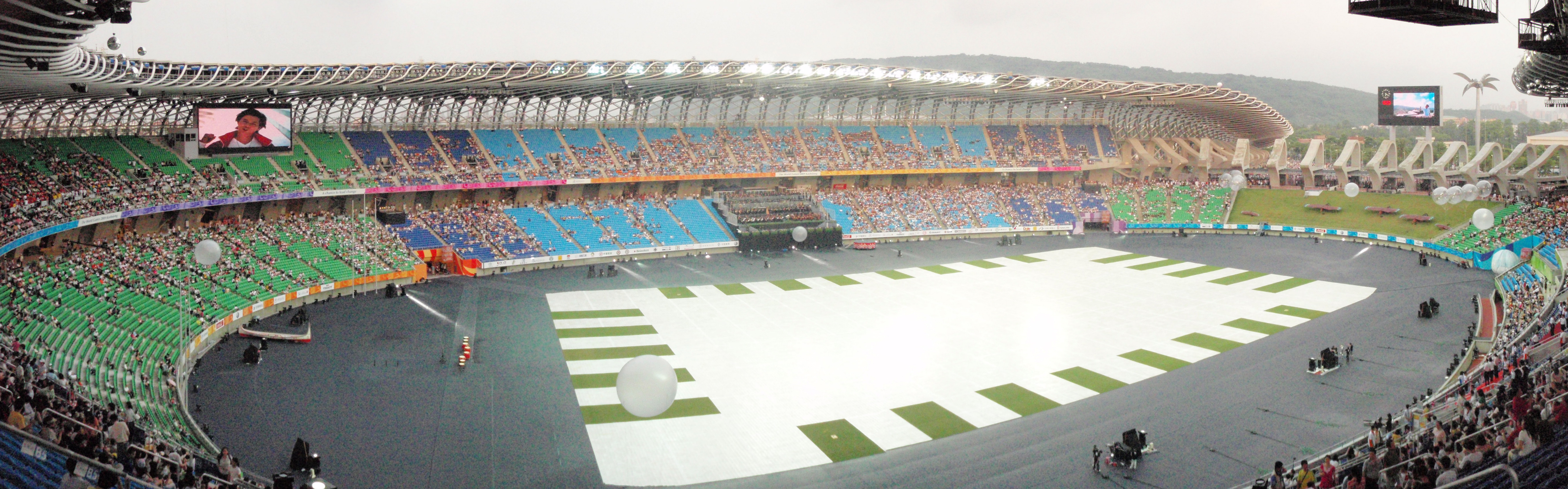
The 2009 World Games closing ceremony

== See also ==
- List of stadiums in Taiwan
