= 2010–11 South China AA season =

Football event

South China AA
2010–11 season
- Chairman: Steven Lo
- Head Coach: Chan Ho Yin (caretaker)
- League: 2nd
- Senior Shield: Runners-up
- FA Cup: Winners
- League Cup: Winners
- 2011 AFC Cup: Group stage
- Top goalscorer: League: Chan Siu Ki (5 goals); All: Cheng Lai Hin (7 goals)
Home colours	Away colours	Third colours

In the 2010–11 season, South China has got 2 champions and 2 runners-up in the league and cups. South China is also one of the participating team for Hong Kong in AFC Cup. The team is coached by Hong Kong coach Chan Ho Yin.

== Squad ==
No.	Nationality	Name	Date of birth	Year of join	Last Club
Goalkeeper
1	(Hong Kong)	Yapp Hung Fai（葉鴻輝）	21 March 1990	2010	(Hong Kong) TSW Pegasus FC
23	(Hong Kong)	Zhang Chunhui（張春暉）	14 March 1983	2006	Hong Kong Rangers FC
32	(Hong Kong)	Fan Chun Yip（范俊業）	1 May 1976	2010	(Hong Kong) Shatin SA
Defender
2	(Hong Kong)	Lee Chi Ho（李志豪）	16 November 1982	2001	(Hong Kong) Yee Hope FC
3	(Hong Kong)	Poon Yiu Cheuk（潘耀焯）	19 September 1977	2008	(Hong Kong) Happy Valley AA
4	(Hong Kong)	Chiu Chun Kit（趙俊傑）	4 October 1983	2010	(Hong Kong) Tai Po FC
6	(Hong Kong)	Wong Chin Hung（黃展鴻）	2 March 1982	2007	Hong Kong Rangers FC
14/30	(Brazil)	Joel Bertoti Padilha（祖爾）	24 July 1980	2010	(China) Guangdong Sunray Cave F.C.
15	(Hong Kong)	Chan Wai Ho（陳偉豪）	24 April 1982	2011	Hong Kong Rangers FC
20	(Hong Kong)	Lau Nim Yat（劉念溢）	4 December 1989	2010	(Hong Kong) TSW Pegasus FC
21	(Hong Kong)	Man Pei Tak（文彼得）	16 February 1982	2006	Hong Kong Rangers FC
33	(Hong Kong)	Ng Wai Chiu（吳偉超）	22 October 1981	2011	(China) Hangzhou Nabel Greentown F.C.
Midfielder
5	(Hong Kong)	Bai He（白鶴）	9 November 1982	2006	(China) Chengdu Wuniu
8	(Hong Kong)	Xu Deshuai（徐德帥）	13 July 1987	2010	(Hong Kong) Citizen AA
9	(Hong Kong)	Lee Wai Lim（李威廉）	5 May 1981	2009	(Hong Kong) Tai Po FC
11	(Hong Kong)	Li Haiqiang（李海强）Captain	3 May 1977	2006	(China) Chengdu Wuniu
12	(England)	Nicky Butt（畢特）	21 January 1975	2010	(England) Newcastle United F.C.
16	(Hong Kong)	Leung Chun Pong（梁振邦）	1 October 1986	2009	(Hong Kong) Happy Valley AA
18	(Hong Kong)	Kwok Kin Pong（郭建邦）	30 March 1987	2003	(Hong Kong) Youth Team
25	(Brazil)	Wellingsson de Souza（蘇沙）	7 September 1989	2010	(Brazil) Brasilis
Forward
7	(Hong Kong)	Chan Siu Ki（陳肇麒）	14 July 1985	2008	(Hong Kong) Kitchee SC
10	(Hong Kong)	Au Yeung Yiu Chung（歐陽耀冲）	11 July 1989	2008	(Hong Kong) Workable FC
17	(Brazil)	Giovane Alves da Silva（基奧雲尼）	25 November 1982	2010	(China) Guangdong Sunray Cave F.C.
28	(Brazil)	Tales Schutz（泰利·史高斯）	22 August 1981	2008	(Portugal) Leixões S.C.
31	(Hong Kong)	Cheng Lai Hin（鄭禮騫）	31 March 1986	2010	(Hong Kong) Kitchee
38	(Serbia)	Mateja Kežman（基士文）	12 April 1979	2011	(France) Paris Saint-Germain F.C.

== Transfers ==
=== IN ===
Date	No.	Nationality	Position	Name	Previous club
Pre-Season
May 2010	1	(Hong Kong)	GK	Yapp Hung Fai（葉鴻輝）	TSW Pegasus FC
May 2010	4	(Hong Kong)	DF	Chiu Chun Kit（趙俊傑）	Tai Po FC
May 2010	20	(Hong Kong)	DF	Lau Nim Yat（劉念溢）	TSW Pegasus FC
May 2010	22	(Brazil)	DF	Willian Augusto Alves Conserva（艾維斯）	Mogi Mirim Esporte Clube
May 2010	26	(Brazil)	FW	Leandro Carrijo Silva（卡里袓）	Bangu Atlético Clube
June 2010	8	(Hong Kong)	MF	Xu Deshuai（徐德帥）	Citizen AA
June 2010	31	(Hong Kong)	FW	Cheng Lai Hin（鄭禮騫）	Kitchee SC
June 2010	32	(Hong Kong)	GK	Fan Chun Yip（范俊業）	Shatin SA
Mid-Season
November 2010	12	(England)	MF	Nicky Butt（畢特）	Comeback
December 2010	14	(Brazil)	DF	Joel（祖爾）	Guangdong Sunray Cave F.C.
December 2010	17	(Brazil)	FW	Giovane（基奧雲尼）	Guangdong Sunray Cave F.C.
January 2011	15	(Hong Kong)	DF	Chan Wai Ho（陳偉豪）	Hong Kong Rangers FC
January 2011	38	(Serbia)	FW	Mateja Kežman（基士文）	Paris Saint-Germain F.C.
January 2011	33	(Hong Kong)	DF	Ng Wai Chiu（吳偉超）	Hangzhou Nabel Greentown F.C.

=== Change in position ===
Date	No.	Nationality	Position	Name	New Position
Pre-Season
May 2010	13	(Hong Kong)	MF	Chan Chi Hong（陳志康）	Retire, Assistant Coach
July 2010	14	(Hong Kong)	GK	Tin Man Ho（田文豪）	Assistant Goalkeeper Trainer

=== OUT ===
Date	No.	Nationality	Position	Name	New Club
Pre-Season
May 2010	4	(Brazil)	DF	Sidraílson da Mata Ribeiro（沙域臣）	Esporte Clube Santo André
May 2010	20	(Hong Kong)	FW	Chao Peng Fei（巢鵬飛）	Sun Hei SC
May 2010	33	(Brazil)	FW	Leonardo Ferreira da Silva（里奧）	Yangon United
July 2010	15	(Hong Kong)	DF	Chan Wai Ho（陳偉豪）	Hong Kong Rangers FC
July 2010	8	(Hong Kong)	DF	Lee Wai Lun（利偉倫）	TSW Pegasus FC
July 2010	17	(Hong Kong)	GK	Ho Kwok Chuen（何國泉）	TSW Pegasus FC
July 2010	22	(Hong Kong)	DF	Gerard Ambassa Guy（卓卓/謝雷）	TSW Pegasus FC
Mid-Season
December 2010	22	(Brazil)	DF	Willian Augusto Alves Conserva（艾維斯）	?
2011/01	26	(Brazil)	FW	Leandro Carrijo Silva（卡里袓）	TSW Pegasus FC （Loan）
February 2011	19	(Hong Kong)	MF	Hinson Leung（梁倬軒）	TSW Pegasus FC （Loan）

== Squad statistics ==
No.	Pos.	Name	League		Senior Shield		League Cup		FA Cup		AFC Cup		Total	
No.	Pos.	Name	Apps	Goals	Apps	Goals	Apps	Goals	Apps	Goals	Apps	Goals	Apps	Goals
1	GK	(Hong Kong) Yapp Hung Fai	10	0	2	0	2	0	1	0	6	0	21	0
2	DF	(Hong Kong) Lee Chi Ho	15	2	3	0	1	0	1	0	5	0	25	2
3	DF	(Hong Kong) Poon Yiu Cheuk	9(1)	0	3	0	1	0	0(1)	0	3	0	18	0
4	DF	(Hong Kong) Chiu Chun Kit	5	0	2(1)	0	2	0	0	0	0	0	10	0
5	MF	(Hong Kong) Bai He	11(2)	1	3	1	1	1	1	0	2(3)	0	23	3
6	DF	(Hong Kong) Wong Chin Hung	9(1)	0	0	0	1(1)	0	2	0	3(2)	0	19	0
7	FW	(Hong Kong) Chan Siu Ki	8(2)	5	2	0	2(1)	0	1	1	5	1	21	7
8	DF	(Hong Kong) Xu Deshuai	10(2)	1	2	0	1(1)	1	0(1)	1	4	1	21	4
9	MF	(Hong Kong) Lee Wai Lim	8(3)	1	2	1	0	0	2	0	1(2)	0	18	2
10	FW	(Hong Kong) Au Yeung Yiu Chung	5(7)	2	1	1	2	0	1(1)	0	3(1)	0	21	3
11	MF	(Hong Kong) Li Haiqiang	8(3)	0	2(1)	1	2	0	1	1	2	0	19	2
12	MF	(England) Nicky Butt	3	1	-		1(1)	1	0	0	5	0	10	2
14/30	MF	(Brazil) Joel	5(1)	0	1	1	1	0	1	0	5	0	14	1
15	MF	(Hong Kong) Chan Wai Ho	4	0	-		-		2	0	4(1)	0	11	0
16	MF	(Hong Kong) Leung Chun Pong	9(4)	2	0	0	2	1	1	0	6	0	22	3
17	FW	(Brazil) Giovane	5(3)	3	1	1	0(1)	1	1(1)	1	-		12	6
18	MF	(Hong Kong) Kwok Kin Pong	9(2)	1	3	0	2(1)	1	1	1	6	0	24	3
19	MF	(Hong Kong) Hinson Leung	0(2)	1	0	0	1	0	-		-		3	1
20	DF	(Hong Kong) Lau Nim Yat	9(1)	2	0(2)	0	2	0	1	0	2	0	17	2
21	DF	(Hong Kong) Man Pei Tak	8(1)	0	2	0	3	0	0(1)	0	3	0	18	0
22	DF	(Brazil) William Alves	8	0	1	1	1	0	-		-		10	1
23	GK	(Hong Kong) Zhang Chunhui	8	0	1	0	1	0	1	0	0	0	11	0
25	MF	(Brazil) Wellingsson de Souza	9(4)	3	0(2)	0	2(1)	1	1	0	-		19	4
26	FW	(Brazil) Leandro Carrijo	4(4)	5	0	0	1	1	-		-		9	6
28	FW	(Brazil) Tales Schutz	8(2)	5	2	1	0	0	0	0	-		12	6
31	FW	(Hong Kong) Cheng Lai Hin	5(6)	3	0(3)	2	1(2)	2	1(1)	0	0(4)	1	23	7
32	GK	(Hong Kong) Fan Chun Yip	0	0	0	0	0	0	0	0	0	0	0	0
33	DF	(Hong Kong) Ng Wai Chiu	1(1)	0	-		-		1	0	0(1)	1	4	1
38	FW	(Serbia) Mateja Kežman	5(1)	2	-		1	2	1	1	4(1)	1	13	6

- Last Update：17 May 2011

== Matches ==
=== Friendly Matches ===
19 August 2010	Shenzhen Ruby (China)	1–1	(Hong Kong) South China	(China) Shenzhen Stadium
16:00			Leandro Carrijo(pen.)	Attendance: 100

=== Training in South Korea ===
2010年 7月27日	Dong-A University (South Korea)	3–2	(Hong Kong) South China	(South Korea) Changwon Football Center
		Report	Lee Wai Lim; William Alves

29 July 2010	University of Ulsan (South Korea)	4–3	(Hong Kong) South China	(South Korea) Changwon Football Center
		Report	William Alves; Leandro Carrijo; Chiu Chun Kit

31 July 2010	Gyeongnam FC (South Korea)	2–2	(Hong Kong) South China	(South Korea) Changwon Football Center
		Report	Li Haiqiang; Leandro Carrijo

3 August 2010	Ulsan Hyundai FC (South Korea)	2–2	(Hong Kong) South China	(South Korea) Changwon Football Center
		Report	Lee Wai Lim; Leandro Carrijo

5 August 2010	Daegu FC (South Korea)	2–3	(Hong Kong) South China	(South Korea) Daegu Stadium
		Report	Leandro Carrijo ? (o.g.)

12 August 2010	Changwon City FC (South Korea)	1–1	(Hong Kong) South China	(South Korea) Changwon Football Center
		Report	Hinson Leung

12 August 2010	Kanoya Taiiku Daigaku (Japan)	1–2	(Hong Kong) South China	(South Korea) Changwon Football Center
		Report	Kwok Kin Pong; Cheng Lai Hin

13 August 2010	Hanyang University (South Korea)	1–2	(Hong Kong) South China	(South Korea) Changwon Football Center
		Report	Kwok Kin Pong; Tales Schutz

=== 2010 Asian Game Friendly ===
2 November 2010	Hong Kong Asian Game U-23 Team	0–4	South China	Siu Sai Wan Sports Ground
20:00		Report	Leandro Carrijo 15', 32', 38'; Cheng Lai Hin 59'

=== Hong Kong First Division League ===
4 September 2010 Week 1	South CHina	2–0	Citizen	Hong Kong Stadium
17:45 GMT+8	Leung Chun Pong 33'; Kwok Kin Pong (yellow card) 77'; Tales Schutz 82'; Lee Chi Ho (yellow card) 90+'	Report		Attendance: 4,332; Referee: Liu Kwok Man

18 September 2010 Week 3	South CHina	2–1	Sun Hei	Hong Kong Stadium
18:00 GMT+8	Chan Siu Ki 23'; Alves (yellow card) 28'; Bai He (yellow card) 35'; Li Haiqiang (yellow card) 53'Poon Yiu Cheuk (yellow card) 75'; Lau Nim Yat 84'	Report	Tse Man Wing (yellow card) 18'; Pak Wing Chak (yellow card) 33'; Adilson Silva (yellow card) 43'; Cristiano Cordeiro (yellow card) 49' (goal) 57'; Lai Ka Fai (yellow card) 49'; Roberto (yellow card) 90+'	Attendance: 2,029; Referee: Pau Sai Yin

24 September 2010 Week 4	Tai Chung	1–6	South China	Kowloon Bay Sports Ground
20:00 GMT+8	Cheng King Ho 2'; Yan Minghao (yellow card) 14'; Lo Chun Kit (yellow card) 34'; Ng Yat Hoi (yellow card) 45+'; Zhang Shuoke (yellow card) 88'	Report	Chiu Chun Kit (yellow card) 31'; Xu Deshuai (yellow card) 34'; Lee Chi Ho (yellow card) 50'; Carrijo 60', 63', 66' (pen.); Souza 69'; Hinson Leung 79'; Au Yeung Yiu Chung 90+'	Attendance: 960; Referee: Tong Kui Sum

30 September 2010 Week 2	South China	2–1	Fourway Rangers	Tseung Kwan O Sports Ground
20:00 GMT+8	Carrijo 53'; Tales Schutz 61'; Xu Deshuai (yellow card) 90+'	Report		Attendance: 608; Referee: Ng Kai Lam
