= Football at the 2009 East Asian Games – Men's team squads =

This article is team squads of Football at the 2009 East Asian Games.

== China ==
Head coach: Liu Chunming

No.	Pos.	Player	Date of birth (age)	Caps	Club
1	GK	Gu Chao	20 August 1989 (aged 20)		(China) Shanghai East Asia F.C.
2	DF	Ren Hang	23 February 1989 (aged 20)		(China) Changsha Ginde
3	DF	Jin Pengxiang	25 January 1990 (aged 19)		(China) Hangzhou Greentown
4	DF	Zheng Zheng	11 July 1989 (aged 20)		(China) Shandong Luneng
5	DF	Yang Boyu	24 June 1989 (aged 20)		(China) Dalian Shide
6	MF	Wu Xi	19 February 1989 (aged 20)		(China) Hebei
7	DF	Zhang Linpeng (c)	9 May 1989 (aged 20)		(China) Shanghai East Asia F.C.
8	MF	Cao Yunding	22 November 1989 (aged 20)		(China) Shanghai East Asia F.C.
9	FW	Zhou Liao	14 January 1989 (aged 20)		(China) Hubei Greenery
10	MF	Piao Cheng	21 August 1989 (aged 20)		(China) Yanbian FC
11	MF	Yin Hongbo	30 October 1989 (aged 20)		(China) Guangdong Sunray Cave
12	MF	Wang Hao	18 February 1989 (aged 20)		(China) Beijing Guoan
14	MF	Jiang Zhe	26 February 1989 (aged 20)		(China) Dalian Yiteng
15	DF	Yu Yang	6 August 1989 (aged 20)		(China) Beijing Guoan
16	DF	Guo Zichao	25 January 1989 (aged 20)		(China) Guangdong Sunray Cave
17	MF	Wang Liang	23 July 1989 (aged 20)		(China) Dalian Shide
18	MF	Wang Yunlong	22 February 1990 (aged 19)		(China) Shanghai East Asia F.C.
19	FW	Gao Di	6 January 1990 (aged 19)		(China) Shandong Luneng
20	MF	Lü Peng	28 October 1989 (aged 20)		(China) Dalian Shide
21	FW	Zhang Jian	28 February 1989 (aged 20)		(China) Chongqing Lifan
22	FW	Zhang Shichang	7 October 1989 (aged 20)		(China) Henan Construction
23	FW	Wu Yan	7 January 1989 (aged 20)		(China) Hubei Greenery

== Hong Kong ==
Head coach: (South Korea) Kim Pan-gon

No.	Pos.	Player	Date of birth (age)	Caps	Goals	Club
1	GK	Li Hon Ho	14 July 1986 (aged 23)			(Football Association of Hong Kong, China) Tai Po
2	DF	Lee Chi Ho	16 November 1982 (aged 27)			(Football Association of Hong Kong, China) South China
3	DF	Fung Kai Hong	25 January 1986 (aged 23)			(Football Association of Hong Kong, China) Citizen
4	MF	Yuen Kin Man	19 January 1989 (aged 20)			(Football Association of Hong Kong, China) TSW Pegasus
5	DF	Lai Man Fei	10 December 1988 (aged 20)			(Football Association of Hong Kong, China) TSW Pegasus
6	DF	Wong Chin Hung	2 March 1982 (aged 27)			(Football Association of Hong Kong, China) South China
7	FW	Chan Siu Ki	14 July 1985 (aged 24)			(Football Association of Hong Kong, China) South China
8	FW	Xu Deshuai	13 July 1987 (aged 22)			(Football Association of Hong Kong, China) Citizen
9	FW	Cheng Lai Hin	31 March 1986 (aged 23)			(Football Association of Hong Kong, China) Kitchee
10	MF	Au Yeung Yiu Chung (c)	11 July 1989 (aged 20)			(Football Association of Hong Kong, China) South China
11	MF	Lai Yiu Cheong	25 September 1988 (aged 21)			(Football Association of Hong Kong, China) TSW Pegasus
12	DF	Lau Nim Yat	11 July 1989 (aged 20)			(Football Association of Hong Kong, China) TSW Pegasus
14	DF	Chan Siu Yuen	2 November 1987 (aged 22)			(Football Association of Hong Kong, China) Fourway Rangers
15	DF	Chan Wai Ho	24 April 1982 (aged 27)			(Football Association of Hong Kong, China) South China
16	MF	Leung Chun Pong	1 October 1986 (aged 23)			(Football Association of Hong Kong, China) South China
17	GK	Yapp Hung Fai	21 March 1990 (aged 19)			(Football Association of Hong Kong, China) TSW Pegasus
18	FW	Kwok Kin Pong	30 March 1987 (aged 22)			(Football Association of Hong Kong, China) South China
19	MF	Hinson Leung	25 November 1987 (aged 22)			(Football Association of Hong Kong, China) South China
20	FW	Chao Pengfei	11 July 1987 (aged 22)			(Football Association of Hong Kong, China) South China
21	DF	Tsang Kam To	21 June 1989 (aged 20)			(Football Association of Hong Kong, China) Kitchee
22	GK	Ng Yat Hoi	6 November 1986 (aged 23)			(Football Association of Hong Kong, China) Shatin
25	DF	So Wai Chuen	26 March 1988 (aged 21)			(Football Association of Hong Kong, China) Sun Hei
28	MF	Ip Chung Long	6 November 1989 (aged 20)			(Football Association of Hong Kong, China) Kitchee

== Japan ==
Head coach: Akihiro Nishimura

No.	Pos.	Player	Date of birth (age)	Caps	Club
1	GK	Koki Otani	8 April 1989 (aged 20)		(Japan) Urawa Red Diamonds
2	DF	Takefumi Toma	21 March 1989 (aged 20)		(Japan) Kashima Antlers
3	DF	Shoma Kamata	15 June 1989 (aged 20)		(Japan) Shonan Bellmare
4	DF	Daisuke Suzuki (c)	June 27, 1989 (age 37)		(Japan) Albirex Niigata
5	DF	Kazuya Yamamura	2 December 1989 (aged 19)		(Japan) Ryutsu Keizai University
6	DF	Shunya Suganuma	29 January 1990 (aged 19)		(Japan) Gamba Osaka
7	DF	Taisuke Muramatsu	16 December 1989 (aged 19)		(Japan) Shonan Bellmare
8	DF	Yusuke Higa	15 May 1989 (aged 20)		(Japan) Ryutsu Keizai University
9	MF	Yosuke Kawai	4 August 1989 (aged 20)		(Japan) Keio University
10	MF	Kosuke Yamamoto	29 October 1989 (aged 20)		(Japan) Jubilo Iwata
11	MF	Takuya Aoki	16 September 1989 (aged 20)		(Japan) Omiya Ardija
12	DF	Taisuke Nakamura	19 July 1989 (aged 20)		(Japan) Kyoto Sanga
13	DF	Kenta Uchida	2 October 1989 (aged 20)		(Japan) Ehime
14	FW	Keisuke Endo	20 March 1989 (aged 20)		(Japan) Mito HollyHock
15	FW	Yuki Oshitani	23 September 1989 (aged 20)		(Japan) F.C. Gifu
16	MF	Hiroki Kawano	29 October 1989 (aged 20)		(Japan) Tokyo Verdy
17	FW	Yoichiro Kakitani	3 January 1990 (aged 19)		(Japan) Tokushima Vortis
18	GK	Takuya Masuda	29 June 1989 (aged 20)		(Japan) Ryutsu Keizai University
19	DF	Kyohei Noborizato	13 November 1990 (aged 19)		(Japan) Kawasaki Frontale
20	FW	Kensuke Nagai	5 March 1989 (aged 20)		(Japan) Fukuoka University
21	FW	Yuya Osako	18 May 1990 (aged 19)		(Japan) Kashima Antlers
22	FW	Shohei Otsuka	11 April 1990 (aged 19)		(Japan) Gamba Osaka
23	GK	Takuya Matsumoto	6 February 1989 (aged 20)		(Japan) Juntendo University

== North Korea ==
Head coach: Jo Tong-sop

No.	Pos.	Player	Date of birth (age)	Caps	Club
1	GK	Ri Kang			
2	DF	Ryang Myong-il			
3	DF	Kim Myong-gyu	16 October 1984 (25)		
9	MF	Pak Song-chol	24 September 1987 (22)		
10	FW	Choe Chol-man	22 September 1985 (24)		
11	FW	Pak Chol-min	10 December 1988		
12	MF	Sin Yong-nam (c)	23 January 1978 (31)		
13	FW	Pak Kwang-ryong	21 September 1992 (17)		
14	DF	Pak Yong-jin			
15	FW	Kim Kwang-hyok	27 August 1985 (24)		
16	DF	Jon Kwang-ik	5 April 1988 (21)		
17	DF	Yun Yong-il	31 July 1988 (21)		
20	GK	Ju Kwang-min	20 May 1990 (19)		
21	FW	Kim Kuk-jin	5 January 1989 (20)		
22	FW	Kim Won-sik	5 November 1991 (18)		
23	MF	Pak Nam-chol	2 July 1985 (24)		
25	MF	Choe Myong-ho	3 July 1988 (21)		
28	DF	Ri Kwang-hyok	17 April 1987 (22)		

== South Korea ==
Head coach: Park Sang-in

No.	Pos.	Player	Date of birth (age)	Caps	Club
1	GK	Kim Min-kyu	December 24, 1982 (aged 26)		(South Korea) Busan Transportation Corporation
2	MF	Kim Ho-you	February 19, 1981 (aged 28)		(South Korea) Ulsan Hyundai Mipo Dolphin
3	MF	Kim Jung-kyum	August 10, 1981 (aged 28)		(South Korea) Daejeon KHNP
4	DF	Kim Hyo-jun (c)	October 13, 1978 (aged 31)		(South Korea) Gimhae City
5	DF	Don Ji-deok	April 28, 1980 (aged 29)		(South Korea) Goyang KB Kookmin Bank
6	MF	Choi Myung-sung	January 4, 1982 (aged 27)		(South Korea) Changwon City
7	MF	Park Hyuk-soon	March 6, 1980 (aged 29)		(South Korea) Busan Transportation Corporation
8	MF	Jung Jae-suk	June 12, 1977 (aged 32)		(South Korea) Ulsan Hyundai Mipo Dolphin
9	FW	Go Min-gi	July 1, 1978 (aged 31)		(South Korea) Gangneung City
10	FW	Kim Han-won	August 6, 1981 (aged 28)		(South Korea) Suwon City
11	FW	Park Jong-chan	October 9, 1981 (aged 28)		(South Korea) Suwon City
12	MF	Lee Seung-hwan	February 16, 1985 (aged 24)		(South Korea) Gimhae City
13	FW	Yoon Won-chul	January 6, 1979 (aged 30)		(South Korea) Cheonan City
14	FW	Lee Yong-seung	September 28, 1984 (aged 25)		(South Korea) Busan Transportation Corporation
15	DF	Lee Jae-young	September 5, 1986 (aged 23)		(South Korea) Nowon Hummel
16	MF	Woo Joo-young	January 18, 1981 (aged 28)		(South Korea) Incheon Korail
17	MF	Jeon Jae-hee	December 3, 1984 (aged 24)		(South Korea) Ansan Hallelujah
18	GK	Kang Sung-il	June 4, 1979 (aged 30)		(South Korea) Daejeon KHNP

== Macau ==
Head coach: (Hong Kong) Leung Sui Wing

No.	Pos.	Player	Date of birth (age)	Caps	Club
1	GK	Leong Chon Kit	6 June 1980 (aged 29)		PSP de Macau
4	MF	Loi Wai Hong	17 January 1992 (aged 17)		(Macau) MFA Development
5	DF	Lam Ka Pou	10 July 1985 (aged 24)		(Macau) GD Lam Pak
6	DF	Geofredo Cheung (c)	18 May 1979 (aged 30)		(Macau) GD Lam Pak
7	MF	Sio Ka Un	16 March 1992 (aged 17)		(Macau) MFA Development
8	MF	Che Chi Man	7 August 1975 (aged 34)		(Macau) GD Lam Pak
9	FW	Chan Kin Seng	19 March 1985 (aged 24)		(Macau) Windsor Arch Ka I
10	MF	Luis Manuel Amorim	25 May 1986 (aged 23)		(Macau) MFA Development
11	DF	Vernon Wong	19 November 1989 (aged 20)		(Macau) MFA Development
13	FW	Lei Fu Weng	23 October 1986 (aged 23)		(Macau) Windsor Arch Ka I
14	FW	Chong Chi Chio	1 January 1986 (aged 23)		(Macau) MFA Development
15	DF	Cheng U Hin	28 July 1990 (aged 19)		(Macau) MFA Development
16	MF	Lei Ka Kei	10 January 1989 (aged 20)		(Macau) MFA Development
17	DF	Mok Tsz Yeung	7 January 1988 (aged 21)		(Macau) MFA Development
18	MF	Chow Wai Ho	1 February 1989 (aged 20)		(Macau) MFA Development
19	DF	Un Tak Wai	15 April 1988 (aged 21)		(Macau) MFA Development
20	FW	Chong In Leong	8 July 1987 (aged 22)		(Macau) MFA Development
22	GK	Chan Ka Kei	10 January 1989 (aged 20)		(Macau) MFA Development
