= Yip Chi Ho =

Hong Kong footballer

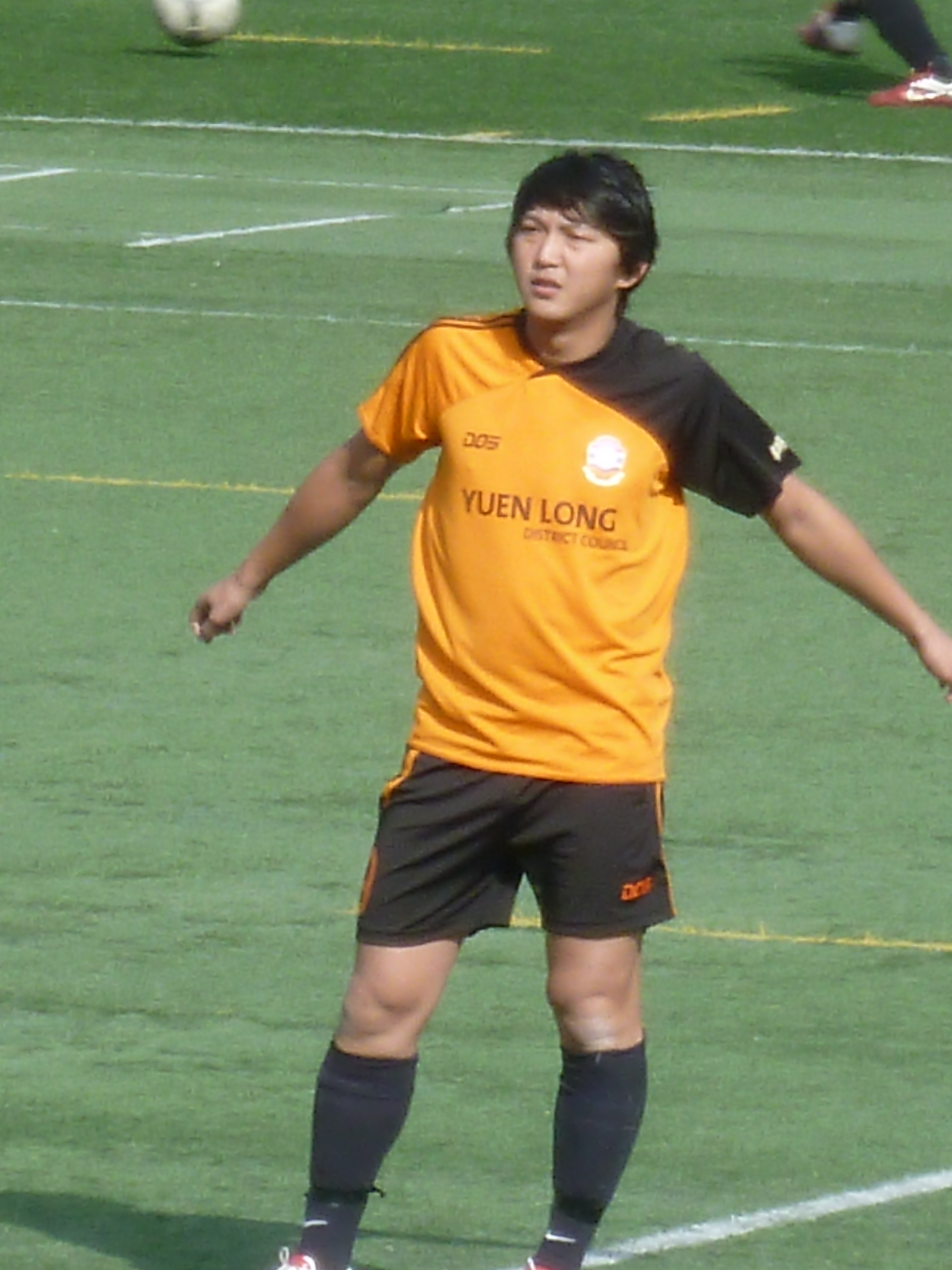

Personal information
- Full name: Yip Chi Ho
- Date of birth: 21 October 1985 (age 41)
- Place of birth: Hong Kong
- Height: 1.75 m (5 ft 9 in)
- Position: Right winger

Senior career*
Years	Team	Apps	(Gls)
2001–2007	Hong Kong Rangers	42	(4)
2002–2003	→ Double Flower (loan)	4	(2)
2003–2004	→ Kitchee (loan)	9	(3)
2007–2010	South China	5	(0)
2008–2010	→ Pegasus (loan)	20	(3)
2010–2011	Fourway	16	(2)
2011–2012	Southern	8	(3)
2012	Hong Kong Rangers	11	(5)
2012–2013	Yuen Long	16	(6)
2013–2014	Tai Po	20	(6)
2014–2015	Double Flower	10	(2)
2015–2019	Hoi King	30	(18)
2019–2020	Wong Tai Sin	9	(2)
2022–	Kwai Tsing	69	(16)

International career
- Hong Kong U-23
- * Club domestic league appearances and goals as of 16 May 2026

Yip Chi Ho (Chinese: 葉志豪; Jyutping: jip^{6} zi^{3} hou^{4}, born 21 October 1985) is a former Hong Kong professional footballer who played as a midfielder.

== Club career ==
Yip moved to South China from Rangers after the end of the 2006–07 season and represented the club in all six 2008 AFC Cup matches in the season. He was released by Pegasus in 2010.

== Career statistics ==
=== Club ===
As of 14 May 2008

Club	Season	League		League Cup		Senior Shield		FA Cup		AFC Cup		Total	
Club	Season	Apps	Goals	Apps	Goals	Apps	Goals	Apps	Goals	Apps	Goals	Apps	Goals
Double Flower	2002-03	?	?	?	?	?	0	?	0	—	—	?	?
Double Flower	Total						0		0	—	—		
Kitchee	2003-04	?	4?	?	1	?	1?	—	—	—	—	?	?
Kitchee	Total				1			—	—	—	—		
Rangers (HKG)	2003-04	?	?	—	—	?	?	1	0	—	—	?	?
Rangers (HKG)	2004-05	?	0	?	0	2	0	1	0	—	—	?	0
Rangers (HKG)	2005-06	13	3	3	0	1	0	1	0	—	—	18	3
Rangers (HKG)	2006-07	6	0	—	—	—	—	—	—	—	—	6	0
Rangers (HKG)	Total		2		2		0	3	0	—	—		
South China	2007-08	5	0	0	0	1	1	0	0	6	0	12	1
South China	Total	5	0	0	0	1	1	0	0	6	0	12	1
TSW Pegasus	2008-09	1 (16)	3	0 (4)	0	0 (2)	0	0 (2)	0	N/A	N/A	1 (24)	3
TSW Pegasus	2009-10	3 (2)	0	0 (0)	0	0 (0)	0	0 (0)	0	N/A	N/A	3 (2)	0
TSW Pegasus	Total	4 (18)	3	0 (4)	0	0 (2)	0	0 (2)	0	N/A	N/A	4 (26)	3
Career Total													
