= 2010–11 Hong Kong League Cup =

Tournament details
- Country: Hong Kong
- Teams: 10

Final positions
- Champions: South China (3rd title)
- Runners-up: TSW Pegasus

Tournament statistics
- Matches played: 9
- Goals scored: 34 (3.78 per match)
- Attendance: 17,305 (1,923 per match)
- Top goal scorer(s): (Hong Kong) Cheng Lai Hin (South China) (Spain) Jordi Tarrés (Kitchee) (Brazil) Itaparica (TSW Pegasus) (Serbia) Mateja Kežman (South China) (2 goals)

The 2010–11 Hong Kong League Cup is the 10th edition of the Hong Kong League Cup. The competition is back after a one-year absence, last played in 2008–09.

Sun Hei known as Convoy Sun Hei back in 2009 were set to defend their championship but went out in the first round.

== Calendar ==
Round	Date	Matches	Clubs
First round	23 November 2010 – 7 December 2010	2	10 → 8
Quarter-finals	8 January 2011 – 9 January 2011	4	8 → 4
Semi-finals	13 February 2011	2	4 → 2
Final	27 March 2011	1	2 → 1

== Bracket ==
Quarter-finals
8 January — Tsing Yi
NT Realty Wofoo Tai Po	1
HKFC	2
9 January — Tsing Yi
TSW Pegasus	3
Fourway Rangers	2
8 January — Tsing Yi
Tai Chung	1
Kitchee	4
9 January — Tsing Yi
Tuen Mun	1
South China	4

Semi-finals
13 February — So Kon Po
HKFC	1
TSW Pegasus (a.e.t.)	2
13 February — So Kon Po
Kitchee	2
South China	4

Final
27 March — Yuen Long
TSW Pegasus	1
South China	2

== First round ==
23 November 2010
20:00

Citizen	0 – 1	Fourway Rangers
	Report	Beto 59'

Siu Sai Wan Sports Ground
Attendance: 161
Referee: Gary Wong Po On

7 December 2010
20:00

South China	2 – 1	Sun Hei
Carrijó 58'; Cheng Lai Hin 72'	Report	Cahê 40'

Siu Sai Wan Sports Ground
Attendance: 443
Referee: Ng Chiu Kok

== Quarter-finals ==
8 January 2011
14:00

NT Realty Wofoo Tai Po	1 – 2	HKFC
To Hon To 26'	Report	McKee 19'; J. Ha 22'

Tsing Yi Sports Ground
Attendance: 534
Referee: Pau Sai Yin

8 January 2011
16:30

Tai Chung	1 – 4	Kitchee
Yan Minghao 20'	Report	Jordi 10', 61'; Chan Man Fai 36'; Lam Ka Wai 43'

Tsing Yi Sports Ground
Attendance: 534
Referee: Ng Kai Lam

9 January 2011
14:00

TSW Pegasus	3 – 2	Fourway Rangers
Itaparica 24', 33'; Godfred 45'	Report	Kilama 48'; Makhosonke 75'

Tsing Yi Sports Ground
Attendance: 1,443
Referee: Ng Chiu Kok

9 January 2011
16:30

Tuen Mun	1 – 4	South China
Chow Cheuk Fung 75'	Report	Xu Deshuai 10'; Cheng Lai Hin 45'; Bai He 63'; Giovane 79'

Tsing Yi Sports Ground
Attendance: 1,443
Referee: Tong Kui Sum

== Semi-finals ==
13 February 2011
14:00

HKFC	1 – 2 (a.e.t.)	TSW Pegasus
Ghéczy 31'	Report	Lee Hong Lim 87'; Gerard 95'

Hong Kong Stadium
Attendance: 4,562
Referee: Tong Kui Sum

13 February 2011
16:30

Kitchee	2 – 4	South China
Roberto 50'; Gao Wen 88'	Report	Kežman 32', 83'; Leung Chun Pong 56'; Kwok Kin Pong 79'

Hong Kong Stadium
Attendance: 4,562
Referee: Liu Kwok Man

== Final ==
27 March 2011
15:00

TSW Pegasus	1 – 2	South China
Chan Ming Kong 78'	Report	Butt 11'; Souza 26'

Yuen Long Stadium
Attendance: 3,623
Referee: Ng Kai Lam

TSW Pegasus	South China

TSW Pegasus:
GK	1	(Hong Kong) Li Hon Ho
RB	6	(Hong Kong) Luk Koon Pong		(substituted off) 80'
CB	5	(Ghana) Wisdom Fofo Agbo (c)
CB	4	(Hong Kong) Deng Jinghuang
LB	13	(Hong Kong) Cheung Kin Fung
DM	10	(Cameroon) Eugene Mbome		(substituted off) 65'
DM	14	(Hong Kong) Chan Ming Kong
RW	26	(Hong Kong) Lai Yiu Cheong		(substituted off) 45+'
AM	11	(Brazil) Itaparica
LW	17	(Hong Kong) Lee Hong Lim	(yellow card) 23'
CF	9	(Hong Kong) Leung Tsz Chun
Substitutes:
GK	33	(Hong Kong) Ho Kwok Chuen
DF	3	(Hong Kong) Gerard Ambassa Guy		(substituted on) 65'
DF	19	(Hong Kong) Yuen Tsun Nam
DF	21	(Hong Kong) Lai Man Fei
DF	25	(Hong Kong) So Wai Chuen		(substituted on) 80'
MF	7	(Taiwan) Chen Po-liang		(substituted on) 45+'
MF	15	(Hong Kong) Yuen Kin Man
Coach：
(Hong Kong) Chan Hiu Ming

South China:
GK	1	(Hong Kong) Yapp Hung Fai
RB	21	(Hong Kong) Man Pei Tak
CB	2	(Hong Kong) Lee Chi Ho
CB	30	(Brazil) Joel	(yellow card) 54'
LB	6	(Hong Kong) Wong Chin Hung
RM	9	(Hong Kong) Lee Wai Lim		(substituted off) 82'
CM	12	(England) Nicky Butt
CM	16	(Hong Kong) Leung Chun Pong
LM	25	(Brazil) Wellingsson de Souza		(substituted off) 70'
RF	7	(Hong Kong) Chan Siu Ki (c)		(substituted off) 38'
LF	17	(Brazil) Giovane
Substitutes:
GK	23	(Hong Kong) Zhang Chunhui
DF	4	(Hong Kong) Chiu Chun Kit
DF	20	(Hong Kong) Lau Nim Yat
MF	5	(Hong Kong) Bai He		(substituted on) 82'
MF	18	(Hong Kong) Kwok Kin Pong		(substituted on) 70'
FW	10	(Hong Kong) Au Yeung Yiu Chung
FW	31	(Hong Kong) Cheng Lai Hin		(substituted on) 38'
Coach:
(Hong Kong) Chan Ho Yin

MATCH OFFICIALS

- Assistant referees:
  - Ng Chiu Kok
  - Lam Chi Ho
- Fourth official: Lam Nai Kei

MATCH RULES

- 90 minutes.
- 30 minutes of extra-time if necessary.
- Penalty shoot-out if scores still level.
- Seven named substitutes
- Maximum of 3 substitutions.

== Scorers ==
The scorers in the 2010–11 Hong Kong League Cup are as follows:

2 goals

- (Hong Kong) Cheng Lai Hin (South China)
- (Spain) Jordi Tarrés (Kitchee)
- (Brazil) Itaparica (TSW Pegasus)
- (Serbia) Mateja Kežman (South China)

1 goal

- (Hong Kong) Bai He (South China)
- (Hong Kong) Xu Deshuai (South China)
- (Hong Kong) Leung Chun Pong (South China)
- (Hong Kong) Kwok Kin Pong (South China)
- (Brazil) Wellingsson de Souza (South China)
- (Brazil) Leandro Carrijo (South China)
- (Brazil) Giovane (South China)
- (England) Nicky Butt (South China)
- (Hong Kong) Gao Wen (Kitchee)
- (Hong Kong) Lam Ka Wai (Kitchee)
- (Hong Kong) Chan Man Fai (Kitchee)
- (Spain) Roberto Losada (Kitchee)
- James Ha (Hong Kong FC)
- (England) Jaimes Mckee (Hong Kong FC)
- (Hungary) Gergely Ghéczy (Hong Kong FC)
- (Hong Kong) Chow Cheuk Fung (Tuen Mun)
- (Hong Kong) To Hon To (NT Realty Wofoo Tai Po)
- (Hong Kong) Gerard Ambassa Guy (TSW Pegasus)
- (Hong Kong) Chan Ming Kong (TSW Pegasus)
- (Ghana) Godfred Karikari (TSW Pegasus)
- (Hong Kong) Lee Hong Lim (TSW Pegasus)
- (Brazil) Cahe (Sun Hei)
- (Cameroon) Jean-Jacques Kilama (Fourway Rangers)
- (Brazil) Roberto Fronza (Fourway Rangers)
- (South Africa) Makhosonke Bhengu (Fourway Rangers)
- (China) Yan Minghao (Tai Chung)
