= 2005 Hong Kong–Macau Interport =

The 61st Hong Kong–Macau Interport was a football match held in Hong Kong on 29 May 2005. Hong Kong won 8-1.

== Squads ==
=== Hong Kong ===
- Directors: Lawrence Yu Kam-kee, Pui Kwan Kay
- Coaches: Lai Sun Cheung, Chu Kwok Kuen

No.	Pos.	Player	Date of birth (age)	Caps	Club
1	GK	Tse Tak Him	10 February 1985 (age 20)		(Hong Kong) Citizen
2	DF	Lee Chi Ho	16 November 1982 (age 22)		(Hong Kong) South China
3	DF	Man Pei Tak	16 February 1982 (age 23)		(Hong Kong) Buler Rangers
5	DF	Kwok Wing Lok	15 January 1986 (age 19)		(Hong Kong) Xiangxue Pharmaceutical
6	MF	Lam Ka Wai	5 June 1985 (age 19)		(Hong Kong) Buler Rangers
7	MF	Chan Yiu Lun	20 July 1982 (age 22)		(Hong Kong) Kitchee
8	MF	Leung Chun Pong	1 October 1986 (age 18)		(Hong Kong) Citizen
9	FW	Cheng Lai Hin	31 March 1986 (age 19)		(Hong Kong) Xiangxue Pharmaceutical
10	MF	So Cheuk Man			(Hong Kong) Xiangxue Pharmaceutical
12	MF	Sham Kwok Keung	10 September 1985 (age 19)		(Hong Kong) Happy Valley
13	FW	Kwok Kin Pong	30 March 1987 (age 18)		(Hong Kong) Xiangxue Pharmaceutical
14	FW	Leung Tsz Chun	19 May 1985 (age 20)		(Hong Kong) South China
15	DF	Chan Wai Ho	24 April 1982 (age 23)		(Hong Kong) Buler Rangers
16	DF	Leung Kam Fai	17 July 1986 (age 18)		(Hong Kong) Xiangxue Pharmaceutical
18	FW	Chan Siu Ki	14 July 1985 (age 19)		(Hong Kong) Kitchee
19	GK	Eugene Kan	5 June 1984 (age 20)		(Hong Kong) Xiangxue Pharmaceutical

=== Macau ===
No.	Pos.	Player	Date of birth (age)	Caps	Club
1	GK	Chu Hon Ming William			
3	DF	Yap Keng Pak			
5	DF	Lam Ka Koi			
6	DF	Ho Kin Tong			
7	MF	Chong Kun Kan			
8	MF	Che Chi Man			
9	MF	Ian Chi Pang			
10	DF	Geofredo Cheung	18 May 1979 (age 26)		
11	FW	Lei Fu Weng			
12	MF	Un Ka Hei			
13	MF	Paulo Cheang	18 August 1984 (age 20)		
14	MF	Rineo Sousa			
17	FW	Iek Kim Pang			
18	MF	羅俊			
19	DF	Lam Ka Pou			
20	MF	劉柏堅			
	GK	Tam Heng Wa			
	DF	Emmanuel Libano Norvega			

== Results ==
29 May 2005
16:00 UTC+8

Hong Kong	8 - 1	Macau
Chan Siu Ki 33', 48', 71'; Chan Yiu Lun 41'; Lam Ka Wai 46'; Lee Chi Ho 87'; Leung Tsz Chun 90'	Report	Chong Kun Kan 86'

Mong Kok Stadium, Hong Kong
