= 2009 Hong Kong Community Shield =

South China	Kitchee
0	2
- Date: 17 August 2009
- Venue: Hong Kong Stadium, Hong Kong
- Attendance: 4,694
- Weather: Clear night

2009 Hong Kong Community Shield was the first edition of the Hong Kong Community Shield. The game was a football match between the winners and the runners-up of the previous season's Hong Kong First Division League.

The match was played in Hong Kong Stadium, on 17 August 2009. The two opposing teams were 2008–09 Hong Kong First Division League winners South China and runners-up Kitchee.

Because of Typhoon Morakot, which was currently affecting Taiwan, a part of the ticket revenue was donated to two charities, the Hong Kong Red Cross and United Christian Hospital.

The game was won by Kitchee with a 2–0 victory over South China. The game's two goals were made by Spanish player Albert Virgili and Equatoguinean player Baruc Nsue.

== Match details ==
17 August 2009
20:00 GMT+8

South China	0 – 2	Kitchee
	Report	Virgili 9'; Baruc Nsue 16'

Hong Kong Stadium, Hong Kong
Attendance: 4,694

South China	Kitchee

SOUTH CHINA:
GK	23	(Hong Kong) Zhang Chunhui		(substituted off) 46'
RB	8	(Hong Kong) Lee Wai Lun
CB	33	(Brazil) Luiz Carlos	(yellow card) 8'	(substituted off) 85'
CB	22	(Hong Kong) Gerard Ambassa Guy		(substituted off) 46'
LB	3	(Hong Kong) Poon Yiu Cheuk		(substituted off) 46'
DM	21	(Hong Kong) Man Pei Tak
RM	9	(Hong Kong) Lee Wai Lim		(substituted off) 67'
CM	30	(Brazil) Ramón	(yellow card) 69'
CM	11	(Hong Kong) Li Haiqiang (c)		(substituted off) 73'
LM	18	(Hong Kong) Kwok Kin Pong		(substituted off) 46'
FW	7	(Hong Kong) Chan Siu Ki		(substituted off) 46'
Substitutes:
GK	17	(Hong Kong) Ho Kwok Chuen		(substituted on) 46'
DF	2	(Hong Kong) Lee Chi Ho		(substituted on) 46'
DF	6	(Hong Kong) Wong Chin Hung		(substituted on) 46'
DF	15	(Hong Kong) Chan Wai Ho		(substituted on) 85'
MF	5	(China) Bai He
MF	13	(Hong Kong) Chan Chi Hong
MF	16	(Hong Kong) Leung Chun Pong		(substituted on) 67'
MF	19	(Hong Kong) Hinson Leung
FW	20	(Hong Kong) Chao Pengfei		(substituted on) 73'
FW	27	(Bolivia) José Castillo		(substituted on) 46'
FW	28	(Brazil) Tales Schutz	(yellow card) 61'	(substituted on) 46'
Coach:
(South Korea) Kim Pan-Gon

KITCHEE:
GK	16	(Spain) Sergio Aure
RB	21	(Hong Kong) Tsang Kam To	(substituted off) 64'
CB	5	(Spain) Ubay Luzardo
CB	4	(Spain) Xavi Pérez
LB	20	(Hong Kong) Li Hang Wui
DM	6	(Hong Kong) Gao Wen
CM	18	(Equatorial Guinea) Baruc Nsue
CM	10	(Hong Kong) Lam Ka Wai	(substituted off) 66'
RF	12	(Hong Kong) Lo Kwan Yee (c)	(substituted off) 75'
CF	8	(Spain) Albert Virgili	(substituted off) 80'
LF	13	(Hong Kong) Chan Man Fai	(substituted off) 46'
Substitutes:
GK	1	(China) Wang Zhenpeng
DF	22	(Hong Kong) Leung Chi Wing	(substituted on) 75'
MF	9	(Spain) Raul Torres	(substituted on) 80'
MF	29	(Hong Kong) Ip Chung Long	(substituted on) 64'
FW	14	(Hong Kong) Cheng Siu Wai	(substituted on) 46'
FW	19	(Hong Kong) Cheng Lai Hin	(substituted on) 66'
Coach:
(Spain) Josep Gombau

MATCH RULES

- 90 minutes.
- Penalty shoot-out if necessary..
- Twelve named substitutes.
- No maximum number of substitutions.

== See also ==
- 2008–09 Hong Kong First Division League
