= Chan Siu Ki =

Hong Kong footballer (born 1985)

Chan Siu Ki 陳肇麒
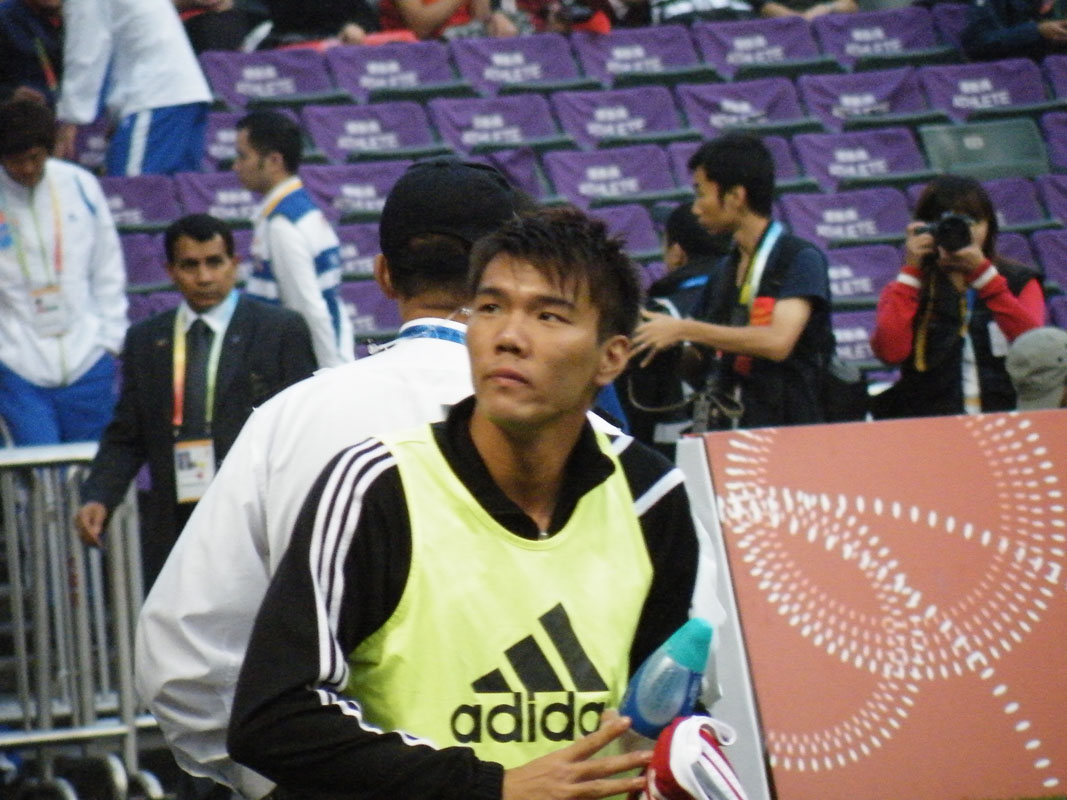
- Chan with Hong Kong at the 2009 East Asian Games

Personal information
- Date of birth: 14 July 1985 (age 41)
- Place of birth: Fanling, British Hong Kong
- Height: 1.88 m (6 ft 2 in)
- Position: Forward

Youth career
- 2002: Tai Po

Senior career*
Years	Team	Apps	(Gls)
2002–2003	Tai Po	14	(12)
2003–2004	Rangers (HKG)	0	(0)
2003–2004	→ Kitchee (loan)	14	(6)
2004–2008	Kitchee	53	(20)
2008–2012	South China	54	(31)
2012–2013	Guangdong Sunray Cave	41	(10)
2014–2017	South China	43	(7)
2017–2020	Pegasus	49	(6)
2020–2024	Eastern District	32	(5)
2024–	Kui Tan	20	(1)

International career
2005–2009	Hong Kong U-23	15	(9)
2004–2017	Hong Kong	70	(40)
Medal record
Representing HKG
East Asian Games
Gold medal – first place	Hong Kong 2009	Team
- * Club domestic league appearances and goals

Chan Siu Ki (Chinese: 陳肇麒; Cantonese Yale: Chàn Siuhkèi; born 14 July 1985) is a Hong Kong former professional footballer who played as a forward. He is the all-time top scorer for the Hong Kong national team with 40 goals.

== Club career ==
=== Early career ===
Chan was spotted by the management of Tai Po when he was playing amateur football. At that time, he was working in a store operated by his family. He was responsible for stock delivery and eventually developed a strong physique. He played for Tai Po in the Hong Kong Third Division. He was spotted by Rangers and joined them. However, he was almost immediately loaned and then sold to Kitchee and thus never played for Rangers.

At Kitchee, Chan developed into a strong and fast striker as the club was using a 4–3–3 formation. As he continued to impress, he was called up to the Hong Kong team in 2005. However, he was later involved in several disciplinary incidents at Kitchee and was suspended from playing duties by the club management. At the end of the 2007–08 season, he joined arch-rivals South China for HKD$800,000, breaking the former transfer fee record of $500,000 in Hong Kong, paid by South China for Chan Wai Ho.

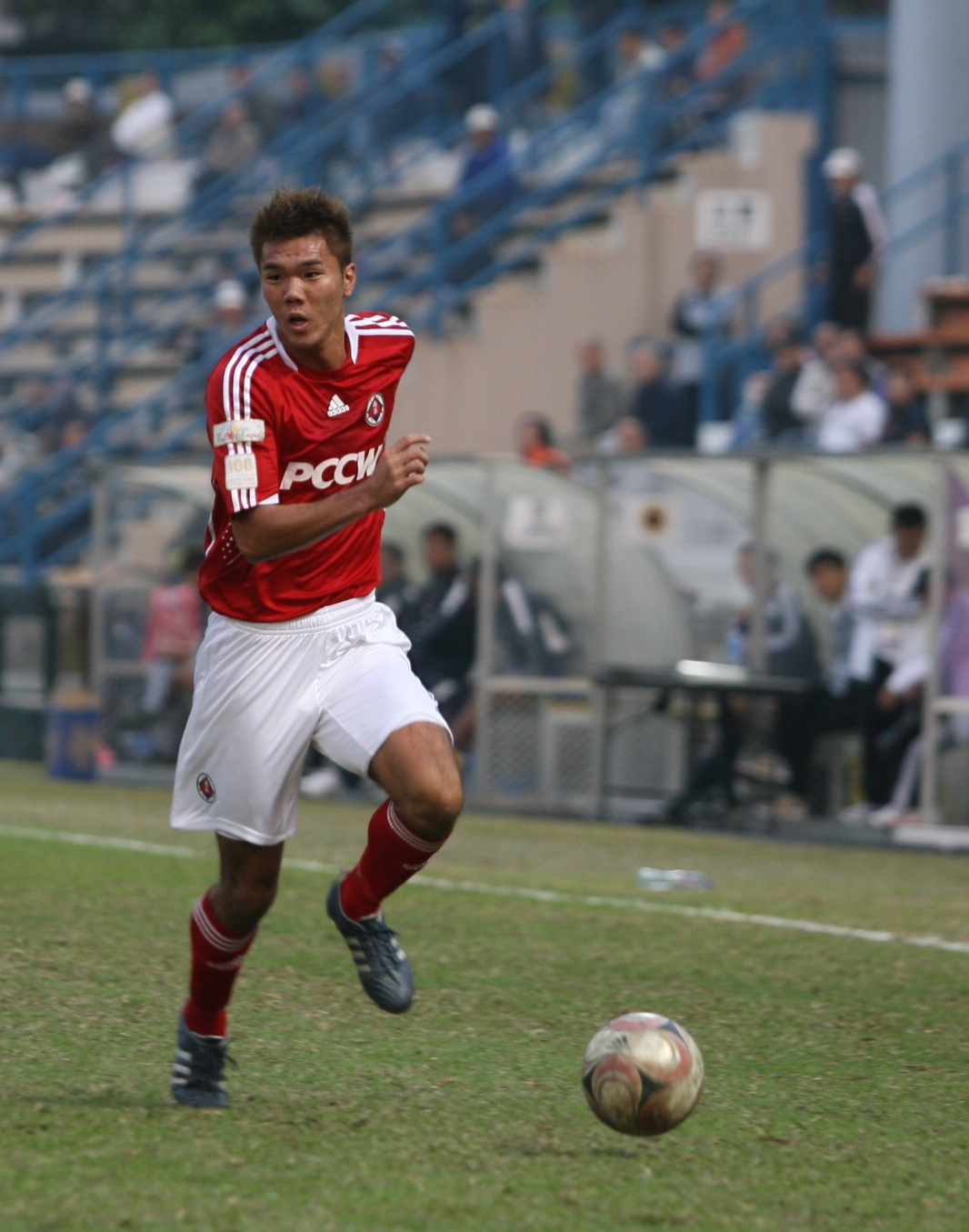
Chan playing for South China in 2008.

=== South China ===
In South China, Chan inherited the no. 7 shirt vacated by Au Wai Lun. In the 2008–09 season, he primarily played on the right wing because the centre forward position was often occupied by Detinho or Cacá. In the 2009–10 season, with the signing of right winger Lee Wai Lim, Chan competed with new signing Leandro Carrijó for his preferred centre forward position after Cacá's return to Brazil. On 1 August 2009, at the Panasonic Invitation Cup, Chan scored the first goal in South China's 2–0 victory over Tottenham Hotspur with a dipping half-volley from 30 yards. Subsequently, after the two clubs forged a partnership, he joined the Spurs for a ten-day trial at some point during December 2009 where he most notably played together with Luka Modrić.

His trial was terminated prematurely as he was recalled by the Hong Kong U-23s progressed into the final of the 2009 East Asian Games. He was ranked 63rd in IFFHS World's Top Goal Scorer of the Year by International Federation of Football History & Statistics alongside Eduardo, Mario Gómez and Fernando Torres.

In the 2009 AFC Cup, Chan was red-carded at the end of the quarter-final first leg against Neftchi Farg'ona and was suspended for two games. He returned in the semi-final second leg to a full Hong Kong Stadium, but was unable to help South China overturn a 1–2 deficit to Kuwait SC. The club eventually lost 1–3 and went out of the tournament.

On 15 December 2009, Chan scored a hat-trick for South China against Shatin. On 24 January 2010, Chan scored 4 goals against Happy Valley as South China won 6–2. This was the first time he had scored 4 goals in a local league match. On 30 January, Chan scored a goal to help South China overturn a 0–2 deficit to win the 2009–10 Hong Kong Senior Challenge Shield, 4–2. Chan was the tournament's top scorer with 4 goals and he was also named the Best Player. On 5 May, he was diagnosed with an osteophyte. But he still played in the second half of the game against Al Riffa in the 2010 AFC Cup. South China in the end lost the game 1–3.

In the 2010–11 season, Chan scored against Sun Hei but was then involved with a collision with teammate Kwok Kin Pong, which resulted in a left knee ligament injury that sidelined him for a month. He returned from injuries in November to score two goals for South China against Kitchee, but could not prevent Kitchee from winning 4–3. On 2 February 2011, he scored two goals against Sun Hei SC to help South China win 3–2 and move back to the top of the league table.

In the 2011 AFC Cup, Chan scored the equalising goal from a Mateja Kezman cross for South China at home against Persipura Jayapura. In the away game to East Bengal, he was sent off after two bookable offences. In May, after teammate Kwok Kin Pong scored with a diving header in a Hong Kong FA Cup match between South China and Sun Hei SC, Chan rushed in to celebrate with Kwok, but his slide did not stop in time and caught Kwok in the face. The video was posted on the internet and picked up by Yahoo!'s Dirty Tackle.

On 20 November 2011, Chan was involved in a scuffle in a match away to Pegasus. In the confusion, he was seen on television slapping Karl Dodd. Dodd retaliated and punched Chan in the face, resulting in him rolling on the ground. Dodd was sent off but Chan only received a yellow card. Chan has since apologised on his Facebook account. Chan only received a warning letter and escaped punishment from HKFA's disciplinary committee for his altercation with Dodd, and Chan was himself surprised by the verdict. He scored his first goal of the season for South China on 24 November when he headed in a cross from Kwok Kin Pong to help South China progress to the semi-final of the 2011–12 Hong Kong Senior Challenge Shield by beating Sham Shui Po by 2–1 (aggregate 3–2). Amidst his second smoking scandal in 4 months, South China's chairman Steven Lo announced on his official blog on 23 May 2012 that Chan's contract had been terminated by the club.

=== Guangdong Sunray Cave ===
On 10 July 2012, Chan announced that he had joined China League One club Guangdong Sunray Cave for a 12-month contract. On 11 August 2012, he scored his first goal in China League One in the match between Guangdong Sunray Cave and Chengdu Blades, where Guangdong Sunray Cave lost to Chengdu Blades 1–2.

=== Return to South China ===
On 31 December 2013, South China's boss Steven Lo announced that Chan would rejoin South China and be given the number 7 shirt. With Chan in the lineup, South China won their first silverware in three years, capturing the 2013–14 Hong Kong Senior Challenge Shield.

At the first annual Hong Kong Community Cup in 2014, Chan scored a goal and assisted on another as South China triumphed, 2–0.

On 26 November 2014, Chan scored the deciding goal in the club's 2–1 victory over Eastern. Chairman Wallace Cheung determined that night to award Chan with a "brave gold shield" and award all future players with one if they followed Chan's work ethic and dedication.

On 18 March 2015, Chan scored a goal against Pahang en route to helping South China top their 2015 AFC Cup group and ensuring qualification into the Round of 16. Later in the month, he was named the HKPL March Player of the Month. At the end of the season, Chan was rewarded with a new contract.

For 2015–16, Chan was switched to central midfield and asked to take more free kicks, corners and throw-ins. On 23 October 2015, South China defeated Metro Gallery, 3–1, in their League Cup group stage encounter thanks to Chan's first goal of the domestic season. On 27 December 2015, Chan missed a penalty in a Senior Shield semi-final shootout against Eastern, allowing the latter team to advance to the Final.

On 24 October 2016, South China was upset by Rangers, 4–2, leading Chan to vent "General loans out troops, soldiers fight their own! Ridiculous! Ridiculous!" on his Facebook page. This was reflecting that Lai Yiu Cheong, who had been loaned to Rangers by Rambo, scored two goals in the match against South China. The criticism was met by action on the part of the board the following day as manager Ricardo Rambo was demoted. On 2 November 2016, Chan scored his first goal under new manager Dejan Antonic in a 2–0 victory over R&F.

=== Pegasus ===
Frustrated by a lack of playing time under Antonic, Chan handed in a transfer request in early January 2017. His request was granted and on 27 January, Chan was sold for $200,000 HK to Pegasus with the player signing a two-and-a-half-year contract with the club.

On 8 April 2018, Chan scored a crucial goal off a free kick to lead Pegasus to a 2–1 win over Eastern in the quarterfinals of the 2017–18 Hong Kong FA Cup.

On 6 June 2020, Chan announced he would retire from professional football and transition to a career in managing karaoke bars.

Chan contributed 4 goals in 17 matches in his last season as a professional, including 3 goals in the Sapling Cup and 1 goal in the HKPL.

== International career ==
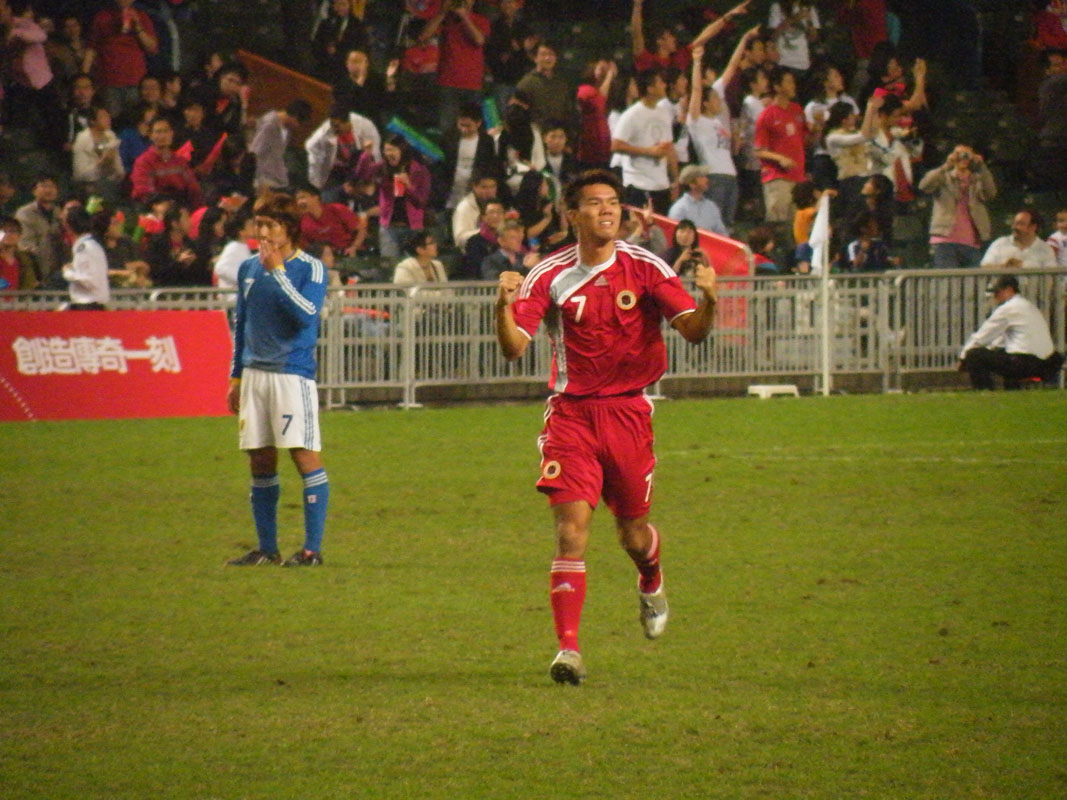
Chan in the final of the 2009 East Asian Games

Chan has represented Hong Kong at both senior and under-23 international levels. He scored 9 goals in 15 games for the U-23 side and 40 goals in 70 games for the senior side.

Chan was urgently recalled by the Hong Kong U-23 team from Tottenham Hotspur for the final of 2009 East Asian Games on 12 December 2009. He arrived just before the match and was called into play at half-time. Two minutes after half-time, he equalised for Hong Kong. He also scored a penalty in the penalty shootout a.e.t, helping Hong Kong to their first international football tournament title. On winning the gold medal, he exclaimed to the assembled media: "We are gold medalists too!" (我哋都係金牌運動員) The line has since been associated with him. Due to a ligament injury to his left knee, Chan was replaced by Kitchee captain Lo Kwan Yee for the 2010 Asian Games.

In the second round of the preliminary competition of the 2010 East Asian Football Championship held in Kaohsiung in August 2009, he missed a penalty against North Korea but scored 4 goals against Guam. In a 2010 FIFA World Cup qualifying match, he scored a hat trick in a game against Timor-Leste, which Hong Kong went on to win 8–1. On 3 June 2011, Chan scored a goal against Malaysia in a friendly, adding his goal tally to 27 and helping him surpass Au Wai Lun to become Hong Kong's all-time top scorer. On 4 October, he scored the first goal in Hong Kong's 6–0 win over Chinese Taipei in the 2011 Long Teng Cup. Hong Kong thus successfully defended the trophy. He also won the Most Valuable Player award. On 29 February 2012, in Hong Kong's first match under new coach Ernie Merrick, Chan scored a hat-trick against Chinese Taipei as Hong Kong won the match 5–1.

Having 70 international caps and 40 international goals in total, Chan is one of the most capped players and also the all-time top scorer in the Hong Kong national football team.

== Personal life ==
In 2009, soon after his move to South China and subsequent success at the East Asian Games, Chan became a celebrity in Hong Kong, leading to his private life becoming a matter of interest to the local paparazzi. He was suspected to have committed adultery after pictures of him and TVB actress Helen Lee had been leaked. Later on, he denied the accusations, claimed to have broken up with Lee in August and reunited with his usual partner, known only as Natalie, in October.

== Political views ==
He appeared in the government's television advertisement for the 2012 Legislative Council electoral reforms, in which he urged people to take their opportunity if they want to score a goal. The advertisement attracted a barrage of criticism against him on South China's official blog. Chan explained through his management company that he has no political views and he would not persuade people to support or oppose the LegCo reforms. He only accepted the invitation to appear in the advert due to the government's sincerity and he received no payment.

== Endorsements ==
Chan is a spokesman for Jockey International along with teammate Man Pei Tak. Both claimed to be embarrassed at the photo shoot but were happy with the wage.

== Career statistics ==
=== Club ===
As of 23 August 2011

Appearances and goals by club, season and competition
Club	Season	League			Senior Shield		League cup (Note: Includes Hong Kong League Cup.)		National cup (Note: Includes Hong Kong FA Cup.)		AFC Cup		Total	
Club	Season	Division	Apps	Goals	Apps	Goals	Apps	Goals	Apps	Goals	Apps	Goals	Apps	Goals
Tai Po	2002–03	Hong Kong Third District Division League					–		–		–			
Rangers (HKG)	2003–04	Hong Kong First Division League	–		–		–		–		–		0	0
Kitchee (loan)	2003–04	Hong Kong First Division League		7		0		0		0	–			7
Kitchee	2004–05	Hong Kong First Division League		4		0		2	2	1	–			7
Kitchee	2005–06	Hong Kong First Division League	11	3	1	0	5	1	1	0	–		20	4
Kitchee	2006–07	Hong Kong First Division League	16	8	2	0	4	0	2	1	–		24	9
Kitchee	2007–08	Hong Kong First Division League	14	6	3	1	6	2	0	0	4	0	27	9
Kitchee	Total			21		1		5		2	4 (0)	0		29
South China	2008–09	Hong Kong First Division League	22	12	2	1	0	0	3	6	6	2	33	21
South China	2009–10	Hong Kong First Division League	12	11	3	4	–		1	0	5	0	21	15
South China	2010–11	Hong Kong First Division League	10	5	2	0	4	0	2	1	5	1	23	7
South China	2011–12	Hong Kong First Division League	0	0	0	0	0	0	0	0	0	0	0	0
South China	Total		44	28	7	5	4	0	6	7	16	3	77	43
Sunray Cave	2012	China League One	15	4	–		0	0	0	0	0	0	15	4
Sunray Cave	2013	China League One	4	2	–		–		0	0	0	0	4	2
Sunray Cave	Total		19	6	0	0	0	0	0	0	0	0	19	6
Career total														

=== International ===
Appearances and goals by national team and year
National team	Year	Apps	Goals
Hong Kong	2004	2	0
Hong Kong	2005	6	10
Hong Kong	2006	9	1
Hong Kong	2007	9	9
Hong Kong	2008	1	4
Hong Kong	2009	8	5
Hong Kong	2010	–	
Hong Kong	2011	6	3
Hong Kong	2012	6	5
Hong Kong	2013	7	0
Hong Kong	2014	3	0
Hong Kong	2015	8	2
Hong Kong	2016	3	0
Hong Kong	2017	2	1
Total		70	40

Scores and results list Hong Kong's goal tally first, score column indicates score after each Chan goal.

List of international goals scored by Chan Siu Ki
No.	Date	Venue	Opponent	Score	Result	Competition
1	7 March 2005	Chungshan Soccer Stadium, Taipei, Taiwan	Guam	2–0	15–0	2005 East Asian Football Championship qualification
2	7 March 2005	Chungshan Soccer Stadium, Taipei, Taiwan	Guam	4–0	15–0	2005 East Asian Football Championship qualification
3	7 March 2005	Chungshan Soccer Stadium, Taipei, Taiwan	Guam	6–0	15–0	2005 East Asian Football Championship qualification
4	7 March 2005	Chungshan Soccer Stadium, Taipei, Taiwan	Guam	7–0	15–0	2005 East Asian Football Championship qualification
5	7 March 2005	Chungshan Soccer Stadium, Taipei, Taiwan	Guam	9–0	15–0	2005 East Asian Football Championship qualification
6	7 March 2005	Chungshan Soccer Stadium, Taipei, Taiwan	Guam	10–0	15–0	2005 East Asian Football Championship qualification
7	7 March 2005	Chungshan Soccer Stadium, Taipei, Taiwan	Guam	14–0	15–0	2005 East Asian Football Championship qualification
8	29 May 2005	Mong Kok Stadium, Mong Kok, Hong Kong	Macau	1–0	8–1	2005 Hong Kong–Macau Interport
9	29 May 2005	Mong Kok Stadium, Mong Kok, Hong Kong	Macau	4–0	8–1	2005 Hong Kong–Macau Interport
10	29 May 2005	Mong Kok Stadium, Mong Kok, Hong Kong	Macau	5–0	8–1	2005 Hong Kong–Macau Interport
11	1 March 2006	Bangabandhu National Stadium, Dhaka, Bangladesh	Bangladesh	1–0	1–0	2007 AFC Asian Cup qualification
12	10 June 2007	Hong Kong Stadium, Causeway Bay, Hong Kong	Macau	2–1	2–1	2007 Hong Kong–Macau Interport
13	21 June 2007	Estádio Campo Desportivo, Taipa, Macau	Guam	1–0	15–1	2008 East Asian Football Championship qualification
14	21 June 2007	Estádio Campo Desportivo, Taipa, Macau	Guam	3–0	15–1	2008 East Asian Football Championship qualification
15	21 June 2007	Estádio Campo Desportivo, Taipa, Macau	Guam	6–1	15–1	2008 East Asian Football Championship qualification
16	21 June 2007	Estádio Campo Desportivo, Taipa, Macau	Guam	9–1	15–1	2008 East Asian Football Championship qualification
17	21 June 2007	Estádio Campo Desportivo, Taipa, Macau	Guam	10–1	15–1	2008 East Asian Football Championship qualification
18	28 October 2007	Hong Kong Stadium, Causeway Bay, Hong Kong	Timor-Leste	2–0	8–1	2010 FIFA World Cup qualification
19	28 October 2007	Hong Kong Stadium, Causeway Bay, Hong Kong	Timor-Leste	6–1	8–1	2010 FIFA World Cup qualification
20	28 October 2007	Hong Kong Stadium, Causeway Bay, Hong Kong	Timor-Leste	8–1	8–1	2010 FIFA World Cup qualification
21	19 November 2008	Macau University of Science and Technology Sports Field, Taipa, Macau	Macau	3–0	9–1	Friendly
22	19 November 2008	Macau University of Science and Technology Sports Field, Taipa, Macau	Macau	5–0	9–1	Friendly
23	19 November 2008	Macau University of Science and Technology Sports Field, Taipa, Macau	Macau	6–0	9–1	Friendly
24	19 November 2008	Macau University of Science and Technology Sports Field, Taipa, Macau	Macau	7–0	9–1	Friendly
25	23 August 2009	Kaohsiung National Stadium, Kaohsiung, Taiwan	Chinese Taipei	3–0	4–0	2010 East Asian Football Championship qualification
26	27 August 2009	Kaohsiung National Stadium, Kaohsiung, Taiwan	Guam	3–0	12–0	2010 East Asian Football Championship qualification
27	27 August 2009	Kaohsiung National Stadium, Kaohsiung, Taiwan	Guam	4–0	12–0	2010 East Asian Football Championship qualification
28	27 August 2009	Kaohsiung National Stadium, Kaohsiung, Taiwan	Guam	8–0	12–0	2010 East Asian Football Championship qualification
29	27 August 2009	Kaohsiung National Stadium, Kaohsiung, Taiwan	Guam	9–0	12–0	2010 East Asian Football Championship qualification
30	3 June 2011	Siu Sai Wan Sports Ground, Hong Kong	Malaysia	1–0	1–1	Friendly
31	2 October 2011	Kaohsiung National Stadium, Kaohsiung, Taiwan	Macau	2–1	5–1	2011 Long Teng Cup
32	4 October 2011	Kaohsiung National Stadium, Kaohsiung, Taiwan	Chinese Taipei	1–0	6–0	2011 Long Teng Cup
33	29 February 2012	Mong Kok Stadium, Mong Kok, Hong Kong	Chinese Taipei	1–0	5–1	Friendly
34	29 February 2012	Mong Kok Stadium, Mong Kok, Hong Kong	Chinese Taipei	2–0	5–1	Friendly
35	29 February 2012	Mong Kok Stadium, Mong Kok, Hong Kong	Chinese Taipei	5–1	5–1	Friendly
36	1 December 2012	Mong Kok Stadium, Mong Kok, Hong Kong	Guam	1–0	2–1	2013 EAFF East Asian Cup qualification
37	1 December 2012	Mong Kok Stadium, Mong Kok, Hong Kong	Guam	2–0	2–1	2013 EAFF East Asian Cup qualification
38	13 October 2015	Changlimithang Stadium, Thimphu, Bhutan	Bhutan	1–0	1–0	2018 FIFA World Cup qualification
39	7 November 2015	Mong Kok Stadium, Mong Kok, Hong Kong	Myanmar	2–0	5–0	Friendly
40	31 August 2017	Jalan Besar Stadium, Kallang, Singapore	Singapore	1–0	1–1	Friendly

== Honours ==
Kitchee

- Hong Kong League Cup: 2005–06, 2006–07
- Hong Kong Senior Shield: 2005–06

South China

- Hong Kong First Division: 2008–09, 2009–10
- Hong Kong Senior Shield: 2009–10
- Hong Kong FA Cup: 2010–11
- Hong Kong League Cup: 2010–11

Hong Kong

- 2009 East Asian Games football event: Gold

Individual

- Hong Kong First Division League Best Young Player: 2003–04, 2004–05, 2006–07
- Hong Kong First Division League Best Eleven Squad: 2008–09
- East Asian Football Championship preliminary competition top scorer: 2009
- Hong Kong FA Cup top scorer: 2008–09
- Hong Kong Senior Challenge Shield Player of the Tournament: 2009–10
- Hong Kong Senior Challenge Shield top scorer: 2009–10
- MVP of the Long Teng Cup: 2011
- Hong Kong Footballer of the Year: 2011

Sporting positions
Preceded by Tam Siu Wai	Kitchee SC captain September 2007 – December 2007	Succeeded by Ivan Jević
Awards
Preceded by Goldbert Chi Chiu	Hong Kong First Division League Best Youth Player Award; 2003–2004 with Sham Kwok Keung	Succeeded by Chan Siu Ki; Tse Tak Him
Preceded by Chan Siu Ki; Sham Kwok Keung	Hong Kong First Division League Best Youth Player Award; 2004–2005 with Tse Tak Him	Succeeded by Cheung Kin Fung; Tse Tak Him
Preceded by Cheung Kin Fung; Tse Tak Him	Hong Kong First Division League Best Youth Player Award; 2006–2007 with Leung Chun Pong	Succeeded by Lo Chun Kit; Kwok Kin Pong
Preceded by Chen Zhizhao; Giovane	Hong Kong FA Cup; Top Scorer; 2008–09	Succeeded by Itaparica; Paulinho
Preceded by Guy Junior Ondoua	Hong Kong Senior Shield; Top Scorer; 2009–10	Succeeded by Paulinho
Preceded by Itaparica	Hong Kong Senior Shield; Player of the Tournament; 2009–10	Succeeded by Festus Baise
