= Lau Nim Yat =

Hong Kong footballer (born 1989)

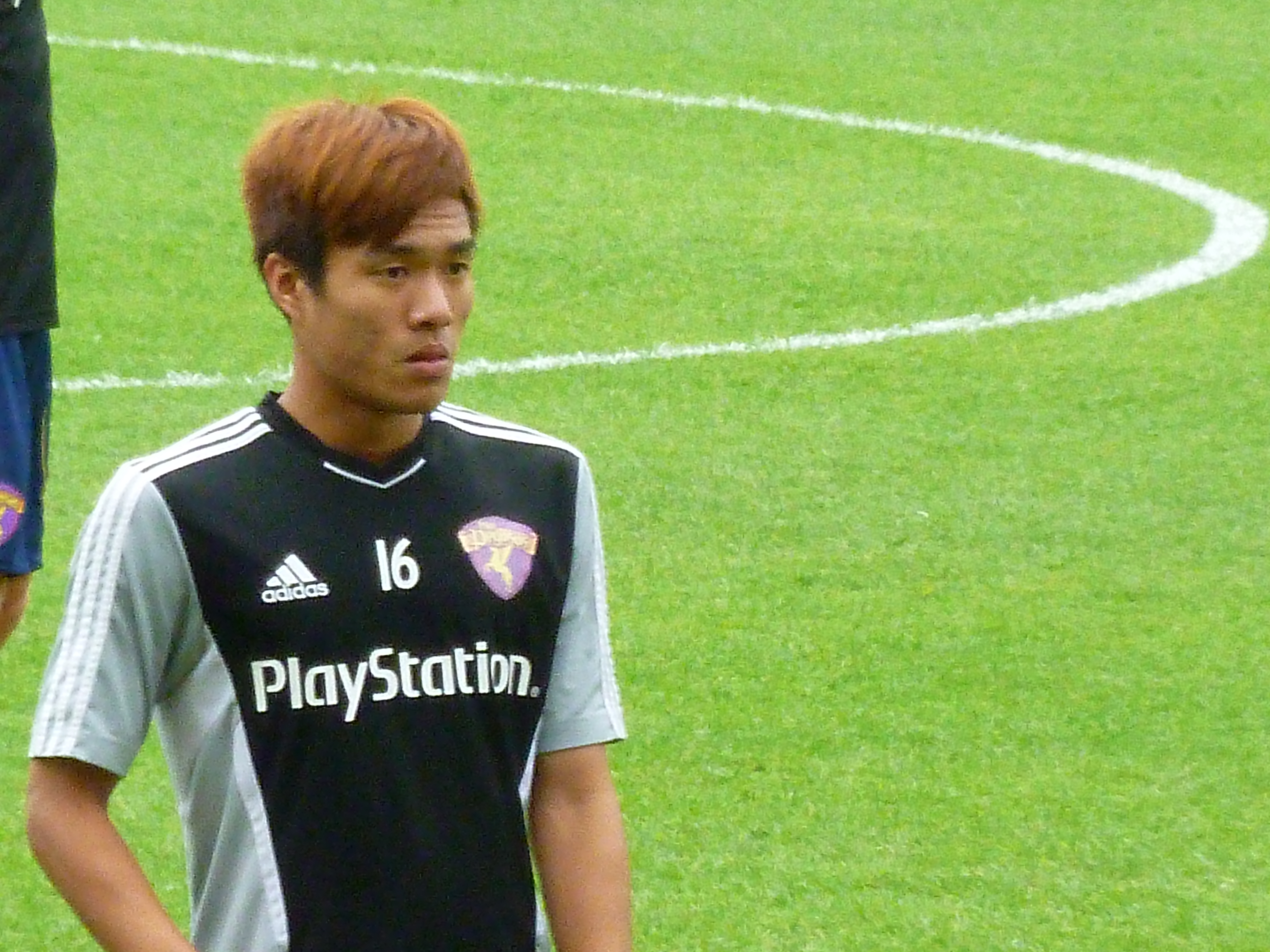

Personal information
- Full name: Lau Nim Yat
- Date of birth: 4 December 1989 (age 36)
- Place of birth: British Hong Kong
- Height: 1.70 m (5 ft 7 in)
- Position: Full-back

Youth career
- 2004–2005: Hong Kong Rangers
- 2005–2006: Hong Kong 09

Senior career*
Years	Team	Apps	(Gls)
2006–2007	Hong Kong 08	17	(1)
2007–2008	Workable	22	(0)
2008–2009	Eastern	19	(0)
2009–2010	Pegasus	13	(0)
2010–2012	South China	10	(2)
2011–2012	→ Pegasus (loan)	17	(0)
2012–2013	Hong Kong Rangers	15	(0)
2013–2014	Eastern	10	(0)
2014–2015	Hong Kong Rangers	6	(0)
2022–2023	Tsuen Wan		

International career
2009–2011	Hong Kong U-23	9	(0)
2010–2012	Hong Kong	4	(0)
Medal record
Representing Hong Kong
East Asian Games
Gold medal – first place	Hong Kong 2009	Team
- * Club domestic league appearances and goals

Lau Nim Yat (Chinese: 劉念溢; Jyutping: lau^{4} nim^{6} jat^{6}, born 4 December 1989) is a Hong Kong former professional footballer who played as a full back.

== Honours ==
Hong Kong

- 2009 East Asian Games: Gold medal

== Career statistics ==
=== Club ===
As of 11 September 2009

Club	Season	League		Senior Shield		League Cup		FA Cup		AFC Cup		Total	
Club	Season	Apps	Goals	Apps	Goals	Apps	Goals	Apps	Goals	Apps	Goals	Apps	Goals
TSW Pegasus	2009–10	15	1	5	0	0	0	0 (0)	0	N/A	N/A	20	1
TSW Pegasus	All	15	1	5	0	0	0	0 (0)	0	N/A	N/A	20	1

=== International ===
==== Hong Kong U-23 ====
As of 19 June 2011

#	Date	Venue	Opponent	Result	Scored	Competition
1	4 December 2009	Siu Sai Wan Sports Ground, Hong Kong	South Korea	4–1	0	2009 East Asian Games
2	8 December 2009	Siu Sai Wan Sports Ground, Hong Kong	China	0–1	0	2009 East Asian Games
3	10 December 2009	Hong Kong Stadium, Hong Kong	North Korea	1–1 (4–2 PSO)	0	2009 East Asian Games
4	26 January 2011	Sai Tso Wan Recreation Ground, Hong Kong	Chinese Taipei	1–0	0	Friendly
5	9 February 2011	Po Kong Village Park, Hong Kong	Indonesia	1–4	0	Friendly
6	23 February 2011	Hong Kong Stadium, Hong Kong	Maldives	4–0	0	2012 AFC Men's Pre-Olympic Tournament
7	9 March 2011	Rasmee Dhandu Stadium, Malé, Maldives	Maldives	3–0	0	2012 AFC Men's Pre-Olympic Tournament
	6 June 2010	Xianghe Sports Center, Beijing	Beijing Baxy	0–1	0	Friendly
8	12 June 2010	Xianghe Sports Center, Beijing	United Arab Emirates	0–2	0	Friendly
9	19 June 2011	JAR Stadium, Tashkent, Uzbekistan	Uzbekistan	0–1	0	2012 AFC Men's Pre-Olympic Tournament

==== Hong Kong ====
As of 16 October 2012

#	Date	Venue	Opponent	Result	Scored	Competition
1	3 March 2010	Hong Kong Stadium, Hong Kong	Yemen	0–0	0	2011 AFC Asian Cup qualification
2	29 February 2012	Mong Kok Stadium, Hong Kong	Chinese Taipei	5–1	0	Friendly
3	10 June 2012	Mong Kok Stadium, Hong Kong	Vietnam	1–2	0	Friendly
4	16 October 2012	Mong Kok Stadium, Mong Kok, Kowloon	Malaysia	0–3	0	Friendly
