= 2009–10 in Hong Kong football =

The 2009-10 season in Hong Kong football, starting July 2009 and ending June 2010:

== Representative team ==
=== Hong Kong Team ===
==== Asian Cup qualifiers ====
Hong Kong played in their Asian Cup 2011 qualifying campaign.

8 October 2009
19:20 UTC+9

Japan	6 – 0	Hong Kong
Okazaki 17', 74', 76'; Nagatomo 28'; Nakazawa 50'; Túlio 67'	Report

Outsourcing Stadium, Shizuoka
Attendance: 16,028
Referee: Mohsen Torky (Iran)

18 November 2009
18:30 UTC+8

Hong Kong	0 – 4	Japan
	Report	Hasebe 32'; Satō 74'; S. Nakamura 84'; Okazaki 90+1' (pen.)

Hong Kong Stadium, Hong Kong
Attendance: 13,254
Referee: Peter Green (Australia)

6 January 2010
18:00 UTC+3

Bahrain	4 – 0	Hong Kong
Abdullatif 35', 40', 44'; Adnan 79'	Report

National Stadium, Madinat 'Isa
Attendance: 1,550
Referee: Abdullah Balideh (Qatar)

3 March 2010
19:30 UTC+8

Hong Kong	0 – 0	Yemen
	Report

Hong Kong Stadium, Hong Kong
Attendance: 1,212
Referee: Minh Tri Vo (Vietnam)

==== East Asian Football Championship semi-final ====
23 August 2009
19:00 UTC+8

Chinese Taipei	0 – 4	Hong Kong
	Report	Lee Wai Lim 38'; Chan Wai Ho 45+1'; Gerard 60'; Chan Siu Ki 63'

World Games Stadium, Kaohsiung
Attendance: 12,000
Referee: Minoru Tojo (Japan)

25 August 2009
16:30 UTC+8

Hong Kong	0 – 0	North Korea
	Report

World Games Stadium, Kaohsiung
Attendance: 100
Referee: Kim Jong Hyeok (South Korea)

27 August 2009
16:30 UTC+8

Hong Kong	12 – 0	Guam
Man Pei Tak 5'; Wong Chin Hung 15'; Chan Siu Ki 18', 35', 75', 77'; Chao Pengfei 37', 71', 90+2'; Leung Chun Pong 41'; Poon Yiu Cheuk 89'; Chan Wai Ho 90'	Report

World Games Stadium, Kaohsiung
Attendance: 1,500
Referee: Minoru Tojo (Japan)

==== Guangdong-Hong Kong Cup ====
Hong Kong's 2–1 win to Guangdong in first leg, Julius Akosah scored two goals in his first game for Hong Kong. However, Guangdong scored two goals by Li Jian in second leg. Guangdong win the Guangdong-Hong Kong Cup. Hong Kong has been stopped to be crown-of-four.

29 Decbember 2009
19:30 HKT

Hong Kong	2 – 1	(China) Guangdong
Akosah 28', 91'	Report	Win Haogbo 55'

Siu Sai Wan Sports Ground, Hong Kong
Attendance: 1,603
Referee: Wong Chi Tang (Hong Kong)

2 January 2010
15:00 CST

Guangdong (China)	2 – 0	Hong Kong
Li Jian 14', 64'	Report

Zhaoqing Sports Center, Zhaoqing
Attendance: 2,000
Referee: He Zhibiao (China)

==== East Asian Football Championship final competition ====
7 February 2010
19:15 UTC+9

South Korea	5 – 0	Hong Kong
Kim Jung-Woo 10'; Gu Ja-Cheol 24'; Lee Dong-Gook 32'; Lee Seung-Ryul 37'; No Byung-Jun 90+3'	Report

Olympic Stadium, Tokyo
Attendance: 2,728
Referee: Ryuji Sato (Japan)

11 February 2010
19:15 UTC+9

Japan	3 – 0	Hong Kong
Tamada 41', 82'; Tulio 65'	Report

Olympic Stadium, Tokyo
Attendance: 16,368
Referee: Zhao Liang (China)

14 February 2010
16:30 UTC+9

Hong Kong	0 – 2	China
	Report	Qu Bo 44', 74' (pen.)

Olympic Stadium, Tokyo
Attendance: 16,439
Referee: Kim Jong-Hyeok (Korea Republic)

=== Hong Kong U-23 ===
==== East Asian Games ====
2009 East Asian Games was held in Hong Kong from 2 December 2009 to 13 December 2009. The tournament was won by Hong Kong, who claimed their first international football tournament title. They defeated Japan 4–2 in a penalty shootout in the final, after extra time had finished in a 1–1 draw.

3 Decbember 2009
UTC+8 18:00

Hong Kong	4 – 1	South Korea
Chan Wai Ho 21'; Wong Chin Hung 30'; Xu Deshuai 65'; Chan Siu Ki 81'	Report by EAG; Report by HKFA	Go Min-Gi 45'

Siu Sai Wan Sports Ground, Hong Kong
Attendance: 5,000
Referee: Phung Dinh Dung (Vietnam)

8 Decbember 2009
UTC+8 18:00

China	1 – 0	Hong Kong
Gao Di 24'	Report by EAG; Report by HKFA

Siu Sai Wan Sports Ground, Hong Kong
Attendance: 6,000
Referee: Phung Dinh Dung (Vietnam)

10 Decbember 2009
UTC+8 20:00

Hong Kong	1 – 1 (a.e.t.)	North Korea
Chan Wai Ho 44'	Report by EAG; Report by HKFA	Pak Kwang-Ryong 85'
Penalties
Au Yeung Yiu Chung (penalty scored); Chan Wai Ho (penalty scored); Lee Chi Ho (penalty scored); Yuen Kin Man (penalty scored)	4 – 2	(penalty scored) Pak Song-Chol; (penalty missed) Ri Kwang-Hyok; (penalty scored) Jon Kwang-Ik; (penalty missed) Kim Kwang-Hyok

Hong Kong Stadium, Hong Kong
Attendance: 9,482
Referee: Sgt Win Cho (Myanmar)

12 Decbember 2009
UTC+8 16:00

Japan	1 – 1 (a.e.t.)	Hong Kong
Muramatsu 22'	Report by EAG; Report by HKFA	Chan Siu Ki 47'
Penalties
Nagai (penalty scored); Otsuka (penalty missed); Suzuki (penalty missed); Aoki (penalty scored)	2 – 4	(penalty missed) Au Yeung Yiu Chung; (penalty scored) Chan Siu Ki; (penalty scored) Chan Wai Ho; (penalty scored) Lee Chi Ho; (penalty scored) Wong Chin Hung

Hong Kong Stadium, Hong Kong
Attendance: 31,884
Referee: Phung Dinh Dung (Vietnam)

==== Hong Kong-Macau Interport ====
20 June 2010
16:00 UTC+8

Macau	1 – 5	Hong Kong
Cheung Chit Un 28'	Report by HKFA; Report by MFA	Cheng Lai Hin 14', 42', 45'; Lo Kwan Yee 72'; Chan Ka Chun 90+'

Estádio Campo Desportivo, Macau
Attendance: 200
Referee: Wong Kuan Lon (Macau)

Match Detail
Macau	Hong Kong

Macau:
GK	22	Chan Ka Kei		(substituted off) 79'
RB	6	Cheung Chit Un (c)	(yellow card) 90+' (yellow-red card) 90+'
CB	4	Lam Ka Pou
CB	8	Cheng Ieong Paulo Cheang
LB	13	Tang Ho Fai		(substituted off) 46'
CM	26	David Caroso
CM	27	Leung Chon In		(substituted off) 57'
RW	10	Lui Wai Hung		(substituted off) 22'
AM	5	Vervon Wong		(substituted off) 84'
LW	9	Chan Kin Seng
CF	29	Leung Ka Hang		(substituted off) 46'
Substitutions:
GK	1	Liu Kin Cho		(substituted on) 79'
DF	2	Choi Chun Yan		(substituted on) 46'
DF	17	Sio Ka Un		(substituted on) 22'
MF	11	Chow Wai Ho		(substituted on) 57'
MF	12	Leung Han Lim
MF	21	Lee Kam Ho	(yellow card) 66'	(substituted on) 46'
FW	7	Tse Fu Wing		(substituted on) 84'
Manager:
Leung Sui Wing

Hong Kong:
GK	1	Li Hon Ho		(substituted off) 82'
RB	5	Chak Ting Fung	(yellow card) 54'	(substituted off) 84'
CB	4	Pak Wing Chak
CB	25	So Wai Chuen		(substituted off) 79'
LB	11	Lai Yiu Cheong
DM	14	Chan Siu Yuen
CM	24	Yeung Chi Lun		(substituted off) 55'
RW	12	Lo Kwan Yee (c)
LW	13	Chan Man Fai
SS	9	Lam Hok Hei		(substituted off) 75'
CF	23	Cheng Lai Hin		(substituted off) 63'
Substitutions:
GK	17	Leung Hing Kit		(substituted on) 82'
GK	22	Liu Fu Yuen
DF	20	Tsang Chi Hau
DF	21	Lai Mai Fei		(substituted on) 79'
MF	3	Cheng King Ho		(substituted on) 75'
MF	7	Ip Chung Long	(yellow card) 66'	(substituted on) 63'
MF	15	Yuen Kin Man	(yellow card) 67'	(substituted on) 55'
MF	16	Chan Ka Chun		(substituted on) 84'
FW	18	Tam Lok Hin
Manager:
Tsang Wai Chung

Assistant referees:
Ng Yik Kwun (Macau)
Tang Yiu Fai (Macau)
Fourth official:
Wong Bing Kwun (Macau)

=== Hong Kong U-19 ===
==== AFC U-19 Championship qualifications ====
7 November 2009
21:00 UTC+7

Australia	3 – 1	Hong Kong
Bulut 31', 35'; Taseski 81'	Report	Wong Wai 56' (pen.)

Si Jalak Harupat Stadium, Bandung
Attendance: 100
Referee: Lee Min Hu (South Korea)

9 November 2009
18:00 UTC+7

Singapore	1 – 2	Hong Kong
Luo Zhenlun Eeugene 63'	Report	Tam Lok Hin 18', 68'

Si Jalak Harupat Stadium, Bandung
Attendance: 300
Referee: Seydov Kakabay (Turkmenistan)

12 November 2009
21:00 UTC+7

Hong Kong	0 – 3	Japan
	Report	Ryo 25'; Gotoku 44', 47'

Si Jalak Harupat Stadium, Bandung
Attendance: 200
Referee: Lee Min Hu (South Korea)

14 November 2009
18:00 UTC+7

Hong Kong	3 – 2	Chinese Taipei
Wong Wai 11'; Chan Siu Kwan Philip 85', 89'	Report	Weng Wei-Pin 69'; Tseng Chin-Wei 81'

Si Jalak Harupat Stadium, Bandung
Attendance: 500
Referee: Seydov Kakabay (Turkmenistan)

17 November 2009
18:00 UTC+7

Hong Kong	1 – 4	Indonesia
Lau Cheuk Hin 8'	Report	Alam 1', 37'; Lestaluhu 54', 89'

Si Jalak Harupat Stadium, Bandung
Attendance: 1,000
Referee: Fan Qi (China PR)

=== Hong Kong U-16 ===
==== AFC U-16 Championship qualifications ====
21 September 2009
13:00 UTC+8

Guam	2 – 3	Hong Kong
Cruz 33'; Damian 35'	Report	Tsui Hoi Kin 23', 86'; Fernandes 85'

Xianghe NTFC Stadium, Hebei
Attendance: 0
Referee: Hettikankanamge Pereira (Sri Lanka)

23 September 2009
13:00 UTC+8

Hong Kong	0 – 3	Timor-Leste
	Report	Batista 40'; Almeida 57', 86'

Xianghe NTFC Stadium, Hebei
Attendance: 0
Referee: Akbar Bakhshizadeh (Iran)

26 September 2009
15:30 UTC+8

China	6 – 0	Hong Kong
Chen Han 15', 32'; Hu Weiwei 27', 45+1'; Qiu Daming 31'; Zheng Dalun 71'	Report

Xianghe NTFC Stadium, Hebei
Attendance: 0
Referee: Phung Dinh Dung (Vietnam)

28 September 2009
13:00 UTC+8

Hong Kong	1 – 1	Singapore
Lau Tak Yan 74'	Report	Nur Ridho 67'

Xianghe NTFC Stadium, Hebei
Attendance: 0
Referee: Dmitry Mashentsev (Kyrgyzstan)

1 October 2009
13:00 UTC+8

Macau	1 – 12	Hong Kong
Vilas 40'	Report	Fernandes 8'; Tsui Hoi Kin 10', 42', 45+2', 90+1'; Hui Ka Lok 30'; Chuck Yiu Kwok 35', 45+1'; Wong Chun Hin 54'; Luk Tsz Ho 61'; Tsang Tsz Hin 75', 90+3'

Xianghe NTFC Stadium, Hebei
Attendance: 0
Referee: Saleem Ali (Maldives)

== Honours ==
Competition	Winner	Details	Match Report
First Division	South China	First Division 2009–10	
Senior Shield	South China	Senior Shield 2009–10	
FA Cup	TSW Pegasus	FA Cup 2009–10	
Community Shield	Kitchee	Community Shield 2009	Report
Second Division	HKFC		
Third Division	Sham Shui Po		
Third Division "A"	Eastern		
Third Division "District"	Sham Shui Po		

== Asian clubs competitions ==
=== AFC Cup 2009 ===
==== Eastern ====
Eastern have no game in 2009–10 season since eliminated in group stage.

==== South China ====
South China played AFC Cup 2009 from round of 16. The team eliminated in semi-final.

2009-06-23
20:00 UTC+8

South China (Hong Kong)	4 – 0	(Singapore) Home United
Kwok Kin Pong 19'; Li Haiqiang 21', 64' (pen.); Cacá 51'	Report

Hong Kong Stadium, Hong Kong
Attendance: 8,972
Referee: Abdullah Balideh (Qatar)

2009-09-15
18:00 UTC+5

Neftchi Farg'ona (Uzbekistan)	5 – 4	(Hong Kong) South China
Saidov 5'; Berdiyev 34', 44', 79', 90+4'	Report	Gerard 34'; Ramón 35'; Kwok Kin Pong 41'; Carrijo 84'

Neftchi Stadium, Fergana
Attendance: 13,800
Referee: Mohamed Masoud (Oman)
2009-09-30
20:00 UTC+8

South China (Hong Kong)	1 – 0	(Uzbekistan) Neftchi Farg'ona
Carrijo 2'	Report

Hong Kong Stadium, Hong Kong
Attendance: 20,112
Referee: Tojo Minoru (Japan)

5–5 on aggregate. South China won on away goals.

2009-10-15
19:30 UTC+3

Al-Kuwait	2 – 1	(Hong Kong) South China
Al Marzooqi 48'; Sulaiman 79'	Report	Gerard 90+2'

Al Kuwait Kaifan Stadium, Kuwait City
Attendance: 2,000
Referee: Abdulrahman Hussain (Qatar)
2009-10-21
20:00 UTC+8

South China (Hong Kong)	0 – 1	Al-Kuwait
	Report	Sulaiman 82'

Hong Kong Stadium, Hong Kong
Attendance: 37,459
Referee: Mohammad Al Saeedi (UAE)

Al-Kuwait won 3–1 on aggregate.

=== AFC Cup 2010 ===
==== NT Realty Wofoo Tai Po ====
NT Realty Wofoo Tai Po eliminated in group stage.

24 February 2010
19:30 UTC+8

Geylang United (Singapore)	1 – 1	(Hong Kong) NT Realty Wofoo Tai Po
Belicak 75'	Report	Annan 70'

Jalan Besar Stadium, Singapore
Attendance: 1,061
Referee: Yu Ming-hsun (Chinese Taipei)

17 March 2010
20:00 UTC+8

NT Realty Wofoo Tai Po (Hong Kong)	0 – 1	(Thailand) Thai Port
	Report	Pitipong 48'

Tseung Kwan O Sports Ground, Hong Kong
Attendance: 1,606
Referee: Sgt Win Cho (Myanmar)

24 March 2010
16:00 UTC+7

SHB Đà Nẵng (Vietnam)	3 – 0	(Hong Kong) NT Realty Wofoo Tai Po
Huynh Quoc Anh 11', 36'; Rogerio 90+2'	Report

Chi Lăng Stadium, Da Nang
Attendance: 15,000
Referee: Kenji Ogiya (Japan)

6 April 2010
20:00 UTC+8

NT Realty Wofoo Tai Po (Hong Kong)	1 – 2	(Vietnam) SHB Đà Nẵng
Chen Liming 90+1'	Report	Huynh Quoc Anh 55'; Hernández 88'

Tseung Kwan O Sports Ground, Hong Kong
Attendance: 952
Referee: Mohd Nafeez Abdul Wahab (Malaysia)

20 April 2010
20:00 UTC+8

NT Realty Wofoo Tai Po (Hong Kong)	1 – 1	(Singapore) Geylang United
Chen Liming 55'	Report	Rahim 14'

Tseung Kwan O Sports Ground, Hong Kong
Attendance: 474
Referee: Dmitry Mashensev (Kyrgyzstan)

27 April 2010
18:30 UTC+7

Thai Port (Thailand)	2 – 0	(Hong Kong) NT Realty Wofoo Tai Po
Issarapong 66'; Nirut 72'	Report

Surakul Stadium, Phuket
Attendance: 600
Referee: Saleem Ali (Maldives)

==== South China ====
South China eliminated in round of 16.

24 February 2010
20:00 UTC+8

South China (Hong Kong)	0 – 0	(Thailand) Muangthong United
	Report

Hong Kong Stadium, Hong Kong
Attendance: 5,725
Referee: Lee Min-hu (South Korea)

17 March 2010
16:00 UTC+5

VB Sports Club (Maldives)	1 – 0	(Hong Kong) South China
Ashfaq 26'	Report

National Stadium, Male
Attendance: 2,500
Referee: Dmitry Mashentsev (Kyrgyzstan)

23 March 2010
20:00 UTC+8

South China (Hong Kong)	6 – 3	(Indonesia) Persiwa Wamena
Schutz 8', 21'; Leo 32', 46'; Kwok Kin Pong 34'; Lee Wai Lim 90+2'	Report	Pieter 6'; Albertho 54'; Weeks 75' (pen.)

Siu Sai Wan Sports Ground, Hong Kong
Attendance: 2,392
Referee: Naser Al-Ghafary (Jordan)

7 April 2010
15:30 UTC+7

Persiwa Wamena (Indonesia)	0 – 2	(Hong Kong) South China
	Report	Chan Wai Ho 39'; Leo 45+2'

Gajayana Stadium, Malang
Attendance: 1,000
Referee: Kenji Ogiya (Japan)

20 April 2010
18:30 UTC+7

Muangthong United (Thailand)	0 – 1	(Hong Kong) South China
	Report	Wong Chin Hung 89'

Surakul Stadium, Phuket
Attendance: 6.000
Referee: Yu Ming-hsun (Chinese Taipei)

27 April 2010
20:00 UTC+8

South China (Hong Kong)	3 – 1	(Maldives) VB Sports Club
Leo 45', 83'; Leung Chun Pong 57'	Report	Ashfaq 1'

Hong Kong Stadium, Hong Kong
Attendance: 9,693
Referee: Tseytlin Vladislav (Uzbeksitan)

11 May 2010
20:00 UTC+8

South China (Hong Kong)	1 – 3	(Bahrain) Al-Riffa
Lee 28'	Report	Mubarak 15'; Makki 18'; Latifa 82'

Hong Kong Stadium, Hong Kong
Attendance: 22,126
Referee: Hiroyoshi Takayama (Japan)

== Exhibition matches ==
=== Friendly ===
7 July 2009
18:30 UTC+8

Hong Kong FC	0 – 5	(Australia) Gold Coast United
		Milson 30', 31'; Mabrahtu 49'; Barisic 54', 81'

Hong Kong Football Club Stadium
Attendance: 400

=== Panasonic Cup ===
==== TSW Pegasus Anniversary Cup ====
2 August 2009
15:00 UTC+8

TSW Pegasus (Hong Kong)	0 – 2	(Thailand) BEC Tero Sasana
	Report	Wuttichai 49'; Anon 52'

Hong Kong Stadium
Attendance: 23,025

==== South China 100th Anniversary Invitation Cup ====
2 August 2009
17:30 UTC+8

South China (Hong Kong)	2 – 0	(England) Tottenham Hotspur
Chan Siu Ki 52'; Li Haiqiang 69' (pen.)	Report

Hong Kong Stadium
Attendance: 23,025
