= Geofredo Cheung =

Macanese footballer

Personal information
- Full name: Geofredo de Sousa Cheung
- Date of birth: 18 May 1979 (age 47)
- Place of birth: Macau
- Height: 1.75 m (5 ft 9 in)
- Position: Left-back

Youth career
- 1999–2002: C.D. Monte Carlo

Senior career*
Years	Team	Apps	(Gls)
2002–2008	C.D. Monte Carlo		
2008–2010	G.D. Lam Pak		
2010–2019	C.D. Monte Carlo	101	(8)
2019–2021	Suncity		

International career^{‡}
2003–2011	Macau	27	(3)
- * Club domestic league appearances and goals as of 15 June 2023 ‡ National team caps and goals as of 1 July 2018

Geofredo de Sousa Cheung (Chinese: 張哲源; born 18 May 1979), also known in Chinese as Cheung Chit Un, is a former Macanese footballer.
