= 2003–04 in Hong Kong football =

The 2003–04 season in Hong Kong football, starting July 2003 and ending June 2004.

== Overview ==
- In August 2003, Real Madrid C.F. played an exhibition match in Hong Kong.

== Representative team ==
=== Hong Kong Team ===
==== Friendly ====
2003-08-04

Singapore	4 – 1	Hong Kong
		Au Wai Lun

Jalan Besar Stadium, Singapore

== Exhibition matches in Hong Kong ==
=== Invest Hong Kong Football Challenge 2003 ===
2003-07-27
15:00 UTC+8

Hong Kong	0 – 6	(England) Liverpool
	Report (Chinese)	Šmicer 15'; Heskey 58', 90+'; Le Tallec 75'; Baroš 77', 90'

Hong Kong Stadium
Attendance: 40,000

=== Real Madrid Asia Tour 2003 ===
Although the team of Hong Kong is officially named Hong Kong, it loaned 6 players from Dalian Shide, including Zhang Enhua, Hao Haidong, Li Ming, Wang Pang, An Qi and Li Yao.

2003-08-08
20:00 UTC+8

Hong Kong	2 – 4	(Spain) Real Madrid
Wang Pang 25'; Li Yao 45+'	Report (Chinese)	Figo 4' (pen.); Ronaldo 13', 33'; Raúl 34'

Hong Kong Stadium
Attendance: 39,000
Referee: Fong Yau Fat (Hong Kong)
