= Lee Chi Ho =

Hong Kong footballer (born 1982)

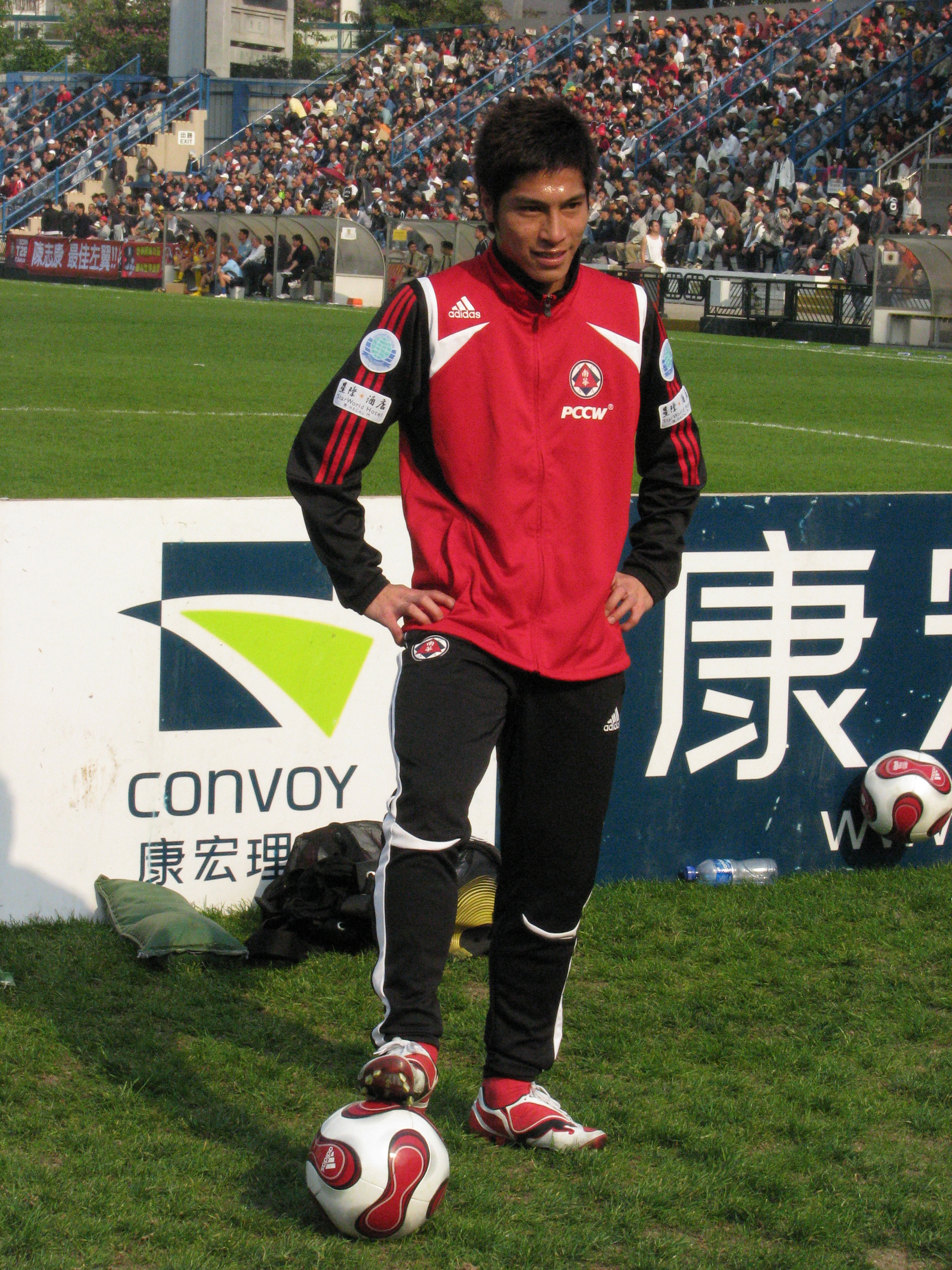

Personal information
- Date of birth: 16 November 1982 (age 43)
- Place of birth: Hong Kong
- Height: 1.76 m (5 ft 9 in)
- Positions: Right-back; centre-back

Senior career*
Years	Team	Apps	(Gls)
1998–2000	Yee Hope	22	(3)
2000–2013	South China	166	(8)
2013–2014	Beijing Guoan	0	(0)
2013–2014	→ South China (loan)	16	(2)
2014–2015	Eastern	15	(0)
2015	Rangers (HKG)	6	(0)
2016–2017	Meizhou Hakka	34	(0)
2017–2018	Eastern	9	(1)
2018–2019	Happy Valley	21	(5)
2019–2020	King Fung	12	(0)
2020–2021	Wong Tai Sin	0	(0)

International career
2009–2010	Hong Kong U23		
2000–2017	Hong Kong	70	(0)
Medal record
Representing Hong Kong
East Asian Games
Gold medal – first place	2009 Hong Kong	Football
- * Club domestic league appearances and goals

Lee Chi Ho (Chinese: 李志豪; Jyutping: lei^{5} zi^{3} hou^{4}; born 16 November 1982) is a Hong Kong former professional footballer. His usual position was right-back while occasionally playing as a centre-back as well.

== Club career ==
=== South China ===
Lee was awarded South China's Most Improved Player of the Season in the 2006–07 season.

=== Beijing Guoan ===
On 31 May 2013, Lee hinted that he would sign for Chinese Super League side Beijing Guoan in June. On 13 June 2013, he travelled to Beijing to sign an 18-month contract with Beijing Guoan.

=== South China ===
Without making an appearance for Beijing Guoan in official matches after joining the club for nearly four months, Lee returned to his former club South China on a three-month loan.

On 4 January 2014, it was announced that Lee was loaned to South China again until the end of the 2013–14 season.

=== Meizhou Hakka ===
Lee joined China League One club Meizhou Hakka in 2015 after the second round of 2018 FIFA World Cup qualification. He had his contract terminated by mutual consent in May 2017 due to the pregnancy of his wife.

=== Eastern ===
In July 2017, Lee re-joined Eastern.

=== Happy Valley ===
On 15 August 2018, Hong Kong First Division club Happy Valley confirmed Lee as one of their signings for the upcoming season.

== International career ==
On 8 October 2000, Lee made his international debut for the Hong Kong national team when Hong Kong beat Singapore by 1–0 in a friendly match.

On 25 September 2012, Lee announced his retirement from international football. However, soon after the announcement the departure of head coach Ernie Merrick, Lee has returned to international football with his fellows in South China.

Having 70 international caps in total, Lee is one of the most capped players in the Hong Kong national team.

== Career statistics ==
=== Club ===
As of 14 June 2013

Club performance			League		Cup		League Cup		Continental		Total	
Season	Club	League	Apps	Goals	Apps	Goals	Apps	Goals	Apps	Goals	Apps	Goals
Hong Kong			League		FA Cup & Shield		League Cup		Asia		Total	
1998–99	Yee Hope	First Division							-			
1999–2000	Yee Hope	First Division							-			
2000–01	Yee Hope	First Division							-			
2001–02	South China	First Division	12	0	0	0	1	0	-		13	0
2002–03	South China	First Division	11	1	1	1	2	0	-		14	2
2003–04	South China	First Division	14	1	2	0	2	0	-		18	1
2004–05	South China	First Division	13	2	1	1	1	0	-		17	1
2005–06	South China	First Division	13	0	3	0	3	0	-		19	0
2006–07	South China	First Division	16	0	8	0	5	0	-		29	0
2007–08	South China	First Division	15	1	4	0	6	0	4	0	29	1
2008–09	South China	First Division	18	0	2	0	2	0	6	0	28	0
2009–10	South China	First Division	10	0	2	0	-		9	1	21	1
2010–11	South China	First Division	15	2	5	0	2	0	5	0	27	2
2011–12	South China	First Division	11	0	6	0	1	0	-		18	0
2012–13	South China	First Division	18	2	9	0	-		-		27	2
China			League		FA Cup		League Cup		Asia		Total	
2013–14	Beijing Guoan	Super League	0	0	0	0	0	0	-		0	0
Total	Yee Hope		22	3					0	0		
Total	South China		166	9	43	2	25	0	24	1	260	10
Total	Beijing Guoan		1	0	0	0	0	0	0	0	1	0
Career Total			189	12					24	1		

=== International ===
As of 13 June 2017

National team	Year	Apps	Goals
Hong Kong	2000	2	0
Hong Kong	2001	4	0
Hong Kong	2002	0	0
Hong Kong	2003	0	0
Hong Kong	2004	0	0
Hong Kong	2005	0	0
Hong Kong	2006	3	0
Hong Kong	2007	4	0
Hong Kong	2008	1	0
Hong Kong	2009	7	0
Hong Kong	2010	9	0
Hong Kong	2011	5	0
Hong Kong	2012	9	0
Hong Kong	2013	7	0
Hong Kong	2014	6	0
Hong Kong	2015	8	0
Hong Kong	2016	1	0
Hong Kong	2017	4	0
Total		70	0

== Honours ==
Happy Valley

- Hong Kong First Division: 2018–19

Hong Kong

- East Asian Games: 2009

Awards and achievements
Preceded by Cristiano Cordeiro	Hong Kong First Division League Most Popular Player; 2007–08	Succeeded by Last Winner
