= Kwok Kin Pong =

Hong Kong footballer (born 1987)

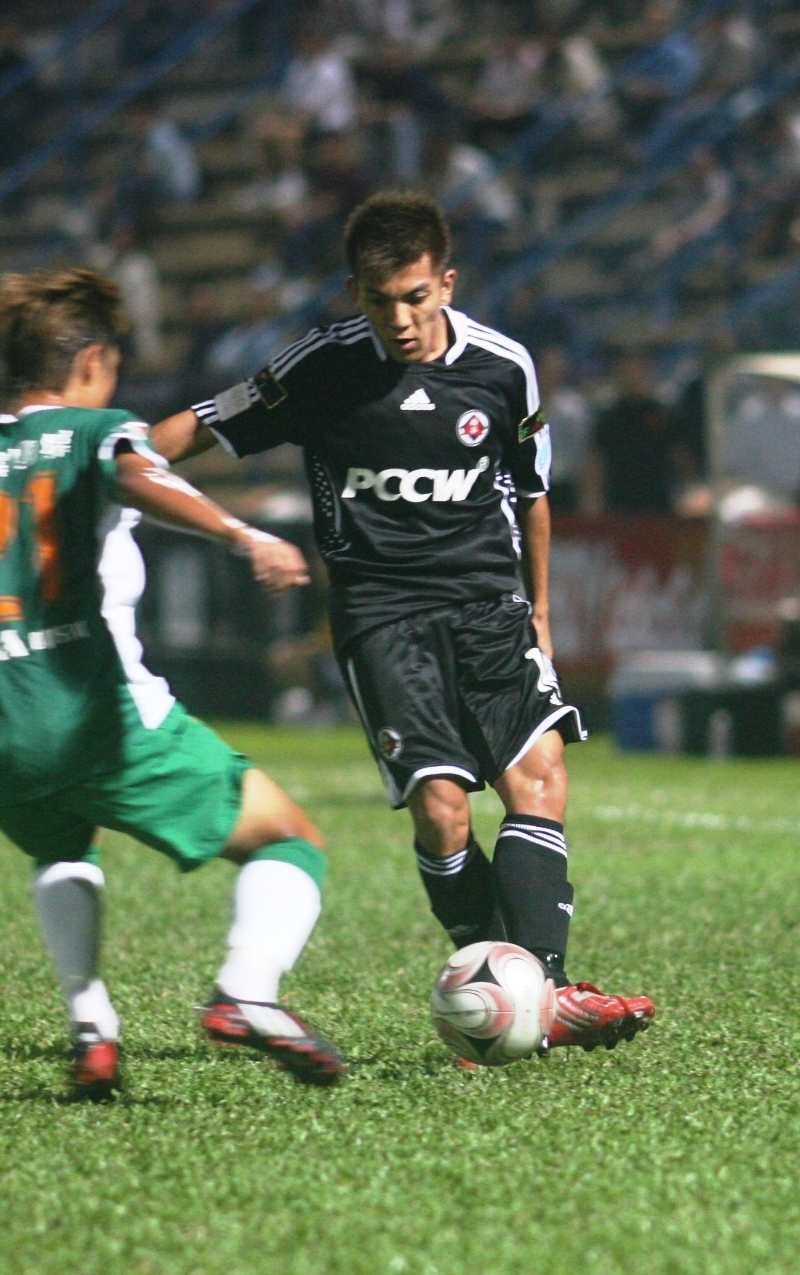

Personal information
- Full name: Kwok Kin Pong
- Date of birth: 30 March 1987 (age 39)
- Place of birth: Hong Kong
- Height: 1.63 m (5 ft 4 in)
- Positions: Left winger; attacking midfielder; full back

Youth career
- –2003: South China

Senior career*
Years	Team	Apps	(Gls)
2003–2015	South China	166	(21)
2004–2005	→ Xiangxue Phar (loan)	10	(0)
2015	→ Eastern (loan)	5	(0)
2015–2016	Pegasus	13	(1)
2019	King Fung	2	(1)
2019–2024	King Mountain	22	(11)
2024	Kui Tan		
2024–2025	3 Sing	19	(3)
2025–	Ravia		

International career
2006–2010	Hong Kong U-23	17	(0)
2009–2016	Hong Kong	37	(1)
Medal record
Representing Hong Kong
East Asian Games
Gold medal – first place	2009 Hong Kong	Football
- * Club domestic league appearances and goals as of 16 May 2026

Kwok Kin Pong (Chinese: 郭建邦; Cantonese Yale: Gwok Ginbōng, born 30 March 1987) is a former Hong Kong professional footballer who played as a defender or a midfielder. As he resembles Hong Kong artist and singer Edison Chen, he was given the nickname 'Edison'.

Kwok was charged by the ICAC on match fixing charges in 2017 but was subsequently cleared.

== Club career ==
=== Youth career ===
He was promoted from the youth team of South China.

=== South China ===
==== 2004–05 season ====
He made his debut for the club in the 2003–04 season when he was 15 years old. The opponent of the First Division match was Fire Services.

==== 2008–09 season ====
In the 2009 AFC Cup, he scored the opening goal with a header against Home United FC in the second round match, paving the way for South China's 4:0 victory. His performance in the match was described by coach Kim Pan-gon as beyond imaginations, as he has been frozen out for much of the season due to poor form and the abundance of attacking talent in the South China squad.

==== 2009–10 season ====
Kwok started 2009–10 season strongly, scoring two goals against Tai Chung FC.

Kwok scored the third goal for South China in the away game to FK Neftchi Farg'ona in the 4:5 defeat.

Kwok was chosen, along with teammate Au Yeung Yiu Chung, to train with Tottenham Hotspur's first team in October 2010 for a week, as part of their development. The visit represents part of Spurs' commitment to supporting the development of the club's partners and support for football development in Hong Kong and China. Upon his return, he promptly scores a goal against Tai Po FC at the 38-minute to help South China to an eventual 2:1 victory.

In the 2010 AFC Cup, Kwok scored against Persiwa Wamena in South China's 6:3 home win.

==== 2010–11 season ====
In the 2011 AFC Cup, Kwok scored the equalising goal for South China in the away game to East Bengal FC, but in the end the match ended 3:3.

=== Eastern ===
In January 2015, Kwok was loaned to Eastern.

=== Pegasus ===
Kwok transferred to Pegasus in 2015 and soon became the captain. He, along with three teammates, were arrested by the ICAC on 7 October 2016 on charges of match fixing. Pegasus suspended all players whom were charged, including Kwok, until their respective investigations were completed.

On 19 April 2018, Kwok was found not guilty of conspiracy to defraud after the judge ruled that he could not convict him beyond a reasonable doubt.

== International career ==
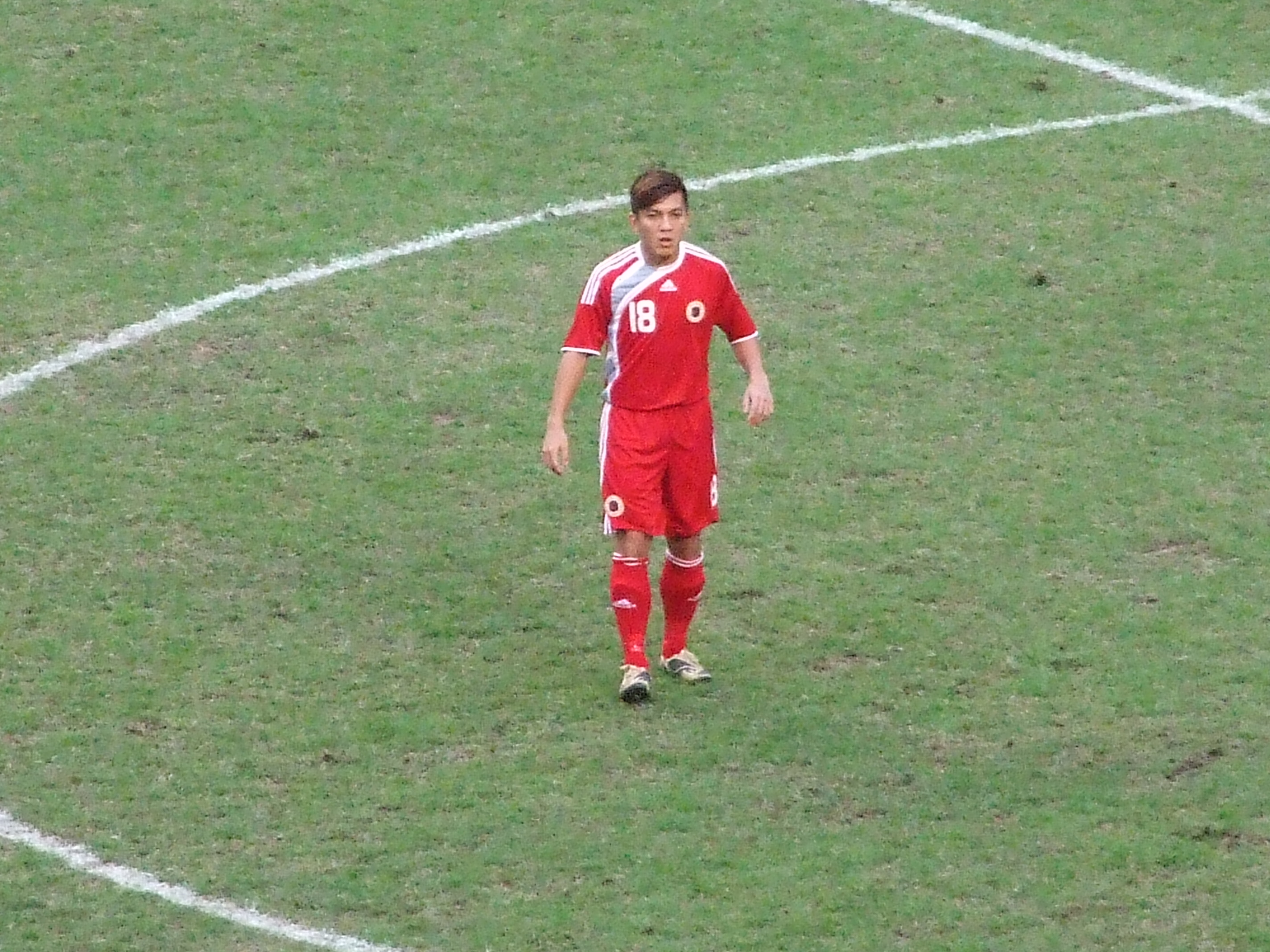
Kwok Kin Pong in Hong Kong colours.

=== Hong Kong U23 ===
Kwok Kin Pong was a member of the Hong Kong national under-23 football team that won the 2009 East Asian Games gold medal.

Despite missing the Long Teng Cup in Taiwan due to his training opportunity at Tottenham Hotspur, Kwok Kin Pong was named in the squad for the 2010 Asian Games. In the tournament, he helped Hong Kong progress to the second round for the first time in 52 years.

== Honours ==
=== International ===
Hong Kong U23

- 2009 East Asian Games Football Event: Gold

== Career statistics ==
=== Club ===
As of 23 August 2011

Club	Season	League		Senior Shield		League Cup		FA Cup		AFC Cup		Total	
Club	Season	Apps	Goals	Apps	Goals	Apps	Goals	Apps	Goals	Apps	Goals	Apps	Goals
South China	2005–06	9	0	0	0	0	0	1	0	-	-	10	0
South China	2006–07	13	4	4	0	4	0	2	0	-	-	22	4
South China	2007–08	10	3	2	1	3	0	2	0	5	0	22	4
South China	2008–09	8	1	2	0	0	0	2	2	3	1	15	4
South China	2009–10	15	5	3	0	-	-	1	0	10	2	29	7
South China	2010–11	10	1	3	0	4	1	2	1	6	1	25	4
South China	2011–12	0	0	0	0	0	0	0	0	-	-	0	0
South China	All	?	?	?	?	?	?	?	?	24	4	?	?

=== International ===
==== Hong Kong U-23 ====
As of 11 November 2010

#	Date	Venue	Opponent	Result	Scored	Competition
1	29 May 2005	Mong Kok Stadium, Hong Kong	Macau	8–1	0	2005 Hong Kong–Macau Interport
2	3 June 2006	Macau UST Stadium, Macau	Macau	0–0	0	2006 Hong Kong–Macau Interport
3	3 December 2006	Jassim Bin Hamad Stadium, Doha, Qatar	Iran	1–2	0	2006 Asian Games
4	6 December 2006	Al-Gharrafa Stadium, Doha, Qatar	Maldives	1–0	0	2006 Asian Games
5	7 February 2007	National Stadium, Dhaka, Bangladesh	Bangladesh	3–0	0	2008 Summer Olympics qualification
6	14 February 2007	Hong Kong Stadium, Hong Kong	Bangladesh	0–1	0	2008 Summer Olympics qualification
7	28 February 2007	Olympic Stadium, Tokyo, Japan	Japan	0–3	0	2008 Summer Olympics qualification
8	14 March 2007	Hong Kong Stadium, Hong Kong	Syria	0–2	0	2008 Summer Olympics qualification
9	28 March 2007	Mong Kok Stadium, Hong Kong	Malaysia	0–1	0	2008 Summer Olympics qualification
10	15 June 2008	Estádio Campo Desportivo, Macau	Macau	1–0	0	2008 Hong Kong–Macau Interport
11	4 December 2009	Siu Sai Wan Sports Ground, Hong Kong	South Korea	4–1	0	2009 East Asian Games
12	8 December 2009	Siu Sai Wan Sports Ground, Hong Kong	China	0–1	0	2009 East Asian Games
13	10 December 2009	Hong Kong Stadium, Hong Kong	North Korea	1–1 (4–2 PSO)	0	2009 East Asian Games
14	12 December 2009	Hong Kong Stadium, Hong Kong	Japan	1–1 (4–2 PSO)	0	2009 East Asian Games
15	7 November 2010	Huadu Stadium, Guangzhou, China	United Arab Emirates	1–1	0	2010 Asian Games
16	9 November 2010	Huadu Stadium, Guangzhou, China	Uzbekistan	1–0	0	2010 Asian Games
17	11 November 2010	Huadu Stadium, Guangzhou, China	Bangladesh	4–1	0	2010 Asian Games

==== Hong Kong ====
As of 5 March 2014

#	Date	Venue	Opponent	Result	Scored	Competition
1	23 August 2009	World Games Stadium, Kaohsiung, Taiwan	Chinese Taipei	4–0	0	2010 East Asian Football Championship Semi-final
2	25 August 2009	World Games Stadium, Kaohsiung, Taiwan	North Korea	0–0	0	2010 East Asian Football Championship Semi-final
3	27 August 2009	World Games Stadium, Kaohsiung, Taiwan	Guam	12–0	0	2010 East Asian Football Championship Semi-final
4	18 November 2009	Hong Kong Stadium, Hong Kong	Japan	0–4	0	2011 AFC Asian Cup qualification
5	7 February 2010	Olympic Stadium, Tokyo, Japan	South Korea	0–5	0	2010 East Asian Football Championship
6	11 February 2010	Olympic Stadium, Tokyo, Japan	Japan	0–3	0	2010 East Asian Football Championship
7	14 February 2010	Olympic Stadium, Tokyo, Japan	China	0–2	0	2010 East Asian Football Championship
8	3 March 2010	Hong Kong Stadium, Hong Kong	Yemen	0–0	0	2011 AFC Asian Cup qualification
9	17 November 2010	Hong Kong Stadium, Hong Kong	Paraguay	0–7	0	Friendly
10	3 June 2011	Siu Sai Wan Sports Ground, Hong Kong	Malaysia	1–1	0	Friendly
11	23 July 2011	Prince Mohamed bin Fahd Stadium, Dammam	Saudi Arabia	0–3	0	2014 FIFA World Cup qualification
12	28 July 2011	Siu Sai Wan Sports Ground, Hong Kong	Saudi Arabia	0–5	0	2014 FIFA World Cup qualification
13	30 September 2011	Kaohsiung National Stadium, Kaohsiung, Taiwan	Philippines	3–3	0	2011 Long Teng Cup
14	2 October 2011	Kaohsiung National Stadium, Kaohsiung, Taiwan	Macau	5–1	0	2011 Long Teng Cup
15	4 October 2011	Kaohsiung National Stadium, Kaohsiung, Taiwan	Chinese Taipei	6–0	1	2011 Long Teng Cup
16	14 November 2012	Shah Alam Stadium, Shah Alam, Malaysia	Malaysia	1–1	0	Friendly
17	3 December 2012	Mong Kok Stadium, Mong Kok, Hong Kong	Australia	0–1	0	2013 EAFF East Asian Cup Preliminary Competition Round 2
18	7 December 2012	Hong Kong Stadium, So Kon Po, Hong Kong	Chinese Taipei	2–0	0	2013 EAFF East Asian Cup Preliminary Competition Round 2
19	9 December 2012	Hong Kong Stadium, So Kon Po, Hong Kong	North Korea	0–4	0	2013 EAFF East Asian Cup Preliminary Competition Round 2
20	22 March 2013	Mong Kok Stadium, Mong Kok, Hong Kong	Vietnam	1–0	0	2015 AFC Asian Cup qualification
21	4 June 2013	Mong Kok Stadium, Mong Kok, Hong Kong	Philippines	0–1	0	Friendly
	6 September 2013	Thuwunna Stadium, Yangon, Myanmar	Myanmar	0–0	0	Friendly
22	10 September 2013	Mong Kok Stadium, Mong Kok, Hong Kong	Singapore	1–0	0	Friendly
23	15 October 2013	Hong Kong Stadium, So Kon Po, Hong Kong	United Arab Emirates	0–4	0	2015 AFC Asian Cup qualification
24	15 November 2013	Mohammed Bin Zayed Stadium, Abu Dhabi, United Arab Emirates	United Arab Emirates	0–4	0	2015 AFC Asian Cup qualification
25	19 November 2013	Hong Kong Stadium, So Kon Po, Hong Kong	Uzbekistan	0–2	0	2015 AFC Asian Cup qualification
26	5 March 2014	Mỹ Đình National Stadium, Hanoi, Vietnam	Vietnam	1–3	0	2015 AFC Asian Cup qualification

Sporting positions
Preceded by Tong Kin Man	Pegasus captain September 2015 –	Succeeded by Incumbent
Awards
Preceded by Chan Siu Ki; Leung Chun Pong	Hong Kong First Division League Best Youth Player Award; 2007–08 with Lo Chun Kit	Succeeded by Au Yeung Yiu Chung; Li Hon Ho
Preceded by Au Yeung Yiu Chung; Li Hon Ho	Hong Kong Top Footballer Awards Best Youth Player; 2009–10 with Yapp Hung Fai	Succeeded by James Ha; To Hon To
