= Hong Kong League Cup =

HKFA League Cup
- Founded: 2000
- Region: Hong Kong
- Teams: 10
- Current champions: Lee Man (1st title)
- Most championships: Kitchee (5 times)
- 2026–27 Hong Kong League Cup

Hong Kong Football Association League Cup (Chinese: 香港足球總會聯賽盃) is an annual football competition contested by clubs in the top-tier Hong Kong domestic football league. The cup had been abolished several times before being relaunched in a new format for the 2025–26 season.

The winners of the competition receive HK$80,000 in prize money, while the runners-up receive HK$40,000.

== Format ==
=== Past Format ===
- All teams in the Hong Kong First Division League (until 2013–14 season) or Hong Kong Premier League (until 2015–16 season) are divided into 2 groups (Group A & B) in the first stage. Each team plays against all other teams in the group once. The top two teams in each group qualify for the semi-finals.
- In the semi-finals, the first team in Group A plays against the second team in Group B while the first team in Group B plays against the second team in Group A.
- The winners of the semi-finals enter the final, which is usually held in Hong Kong Stadium or Mong Kok Stadium.

=== Current Format ===
- All teams in the Hong Kong Premier League enter the competition, with no limitation on foreign players.
- Except final applies single knockout, other rounds apply double elimination, meaning teams will get a redemption opportunity after one defeat and will be eliminated after two defeats.
- Except in the Final where a draw after normal time will lead to 30-minute extra time and a draw after extra time will lead to penalty shootout, for all other Matches a penalty shootout will follow right after a draw in normal time.

== Finals ==
=== Key ===
*	Match went to extra time
^	Match went to extra time with golden goal
†	Match decided by a penalty shootout after extra time

=== Results ===
Edition	Season	Winner	Score	Runners-up	Venue	Attendance
1	2000–01	Happy Valley	2–1 ^	Sun Hei	Mong Kok Stadium	3,078
2	2001–02	South China	3–0	Rangers	Hong Kong Stadium	3,282
3	2002–03	Sun Hei	2–2 †	Happy Valley	Hong Kong Stadium	1,093
4	2003–04	Sun Hei	4–2	Happy Valley	Hong Kong Stadium	3,284
5	2004–05	Sun Hei	1–0	Happy Valley	Hong Kong Stadium	2,468
6	2005–06	Kitchee	4–3	Happy Valley	Mong Kok Stadium	1,680
7	2006–07	Kitchee	2–1	Happy Valley	Mong Kok Stadium	1,355
8	2007–08	South China	4–2	Kitchee	Mong Kok Stadium	4,630
9	2008–09	Sun Hei	2–2 †	Pegasus	Mong Kok Stadium	2,684
10	2010–11	South China	2–1	Pegasus	Yuen Long Stadium	3,623
11	2011–12	Kitchee	2–1	Pegasus	Mong Kok Stadium	3,957
12	2014–15	Kitchee	4–0	South China	Mong Kok Stadium	5,082
13	2015–16	Kitchee	3–0	South China	Mong Kok Stadium	4,616
14	2025–26	Lee Man	2–1	Kitchee	Mong Kok Stadium	3,770
15	2026–27					

== Results by team ==
Team	Winners	Runners-up	Seasons won	Seasons runner-up
Kitchee	5	2	2005–06, 2006–07, 2011–12, 2014–15, 2015–16	2007–08, 2025–26
Sun Hei	4	1	2002–03, 2003–04, 2004–05, 2008–09	2000–01
South China	3	2	2000–01, 2007–08, 2010–11	2014–15, 2015–16
Happy Valley	1	5	2000–01	2002–03, 2003–04, 2004–05, 2005–06, 2006–07
Lee Man	1	—	2025–26	—
Pegasus	—	3	—	2008–09, 2010–11, 2011–12
Rangers	—	1	—	2001–02

== See also ==
- The Hong Kong Football Association
- Hong Kong First Division League
- Hong Kong Premier League
