= 2007–08 Hong Kong League Cup =

The Hong Kong League Cup 2007–08 is the 8th staging of the Hong Kong League Cup.

The competition started on 19 January 2008 with 10 Hong Kong First Division clubs and concluded on 22 March 2008 with South China beat Kitchee by 4-2 in the final. South China won their second League Cup title.

== Teams ==
- Rangers
- Citizen
- Convoy Sun Hei
- Eastern
- Happy Valley
- Kitchee
- Lanwa Redbull
- South China
- Wofoo Tai Po
- Workable

== Details ==
- The 10 teams in Hong Kong First Division League is divided into groups A and B. Each team plays one match with other teams in the group once. The top 2 teams of the groups qualify for semi-finals.
- The teams are allocated in the groups according to their league positions after half season. Group A consists of South China (1st), Wofoo Tai Po (4th), Kitchee (5th), Happy Valley (8th) and Workable (10th). Group B consists of Citizen (2nd), Lanwa Redbull (3rd), Convoy Sun Hei (6th), Eastern (7th) and Bulova Rangers (9th).

== Group stage ==
=== Group A ===
Team	Pts	Pld	W	D	L	GF	GA	GD
South China	9	4	3	0	1	9	5	+4
Kitchee	7	4	2	1	1	9	5	+4
Workable	5	4	1	2	1	2	2	0
Happy Valley	5	4	1	2	1	6	7	-1
Wofoo Tai Po	1	4	0	1	3	2	9	-7

19 January 2008
14:00

Wofoo Tai Po	0 - 1	Happy Valley
	(in chinese)	Law Chun Bong 35'

Mong Kok Stadium
Attendance: 1,867
Referee: Ng Kai Lam

19 January 2008
16:00

South China	0 - 1	Workable
	(in chinese)	Wong Chun Yue 82'

Mong Kok Stadium
Attendance: 1,867
Referee: Fung Ka Yu

26 January 2008
14:00

Workable	1 - 1	Wofoo Tai Po
Roberto Fronza 81' (PEN.)	(in chinese)	Ye Jia 14'

Mong Kok Stadium
Attendance: 923
Referee: Chan Siu Hung

26 January 2008
16:00

Happy Valley	3 - 3	Kitchee
Poon Yiu Cheuk 25' (PEN.) 38' (PEN.); Sham Kwok Keung 39'	(in chinese)	Chan Siu Ki 46' (PEN.); Lo Kwan Yee 53'; Ewane Ngassa 64'

Mong Kok Stadium
Attendance: 923
Referee: Ng Kai Lam

29 January 2008
18:00

Kitchee	1 - 0	Workable
Goran Stankovski 80'	(in chinese)

Mong Kok Stadium
Attendance: 926
Referee: Liu Kwok Man

29 January 2008
20:00

Wofoo Tai Po	1 - 3	South China
Rafael 31'	(in chinese)	Maxwell 1'; Tales Schutz 46' 90'

Mong Kok Stadium
Attendance: 926
Referee: Wong Chi Tang

3 February 2008
14:00

Workable	0 - 0	Happy Valley
	(in chinese)

Siu Sai Wan Sports Ground
Attendance: 1,538
Referee: Cheung Yim Yau

3 February 2008
16:00

South China	2 - 1	Kitchee
Fan Weijun 39'; Maxwell 65'	(in chinese)	Ivan Jevic 74'

Siu Sai Wan Sports Ground
Attendance: 1,538
Referee: Ching Oi Jo

17 February 2008
14:00

Kitchee	4 - 0	Wofoo Tai Po
Wilfed Bamnjo 2'; Chan Siu Ki 28'; Julius Akosah 51'; Hugues Nanmi 88'	(in chinese)

Mong Kok Stadium
Attendance: 2,360
Referee: Ng Chiu Kok

17 February 2008
16:00

Happy Valley	2 - 4	South China
Denisson 11'; Godfred Karikari 22'	(in chinese)	Itaparica 33'; Tales Schutz 45'; Maxwell 49' 81'

Mong Kok Stadium
Attendance: 2,360
Referee: Ching Oi Jo

=== Group B ===
Team	Pts	Pld	W	D	L	GF	GA	GD
Convoy Sun Hei	8	4	2	2	0	7	2	+5
Eastern	6	4	1	3	0	4	3	+1
Bulova Rangers	5	4	1	2	1	6	4	+2
Citizen	3	4	0	3	1	2	4	-2
Lanwa Redbull	2	4	0	2	2	2	8	-6

20 January 2008
14:00

Citizen	1 - 1	Bulova Rangers
Wang Xuanhong 90'	(in chinese)	Liang Zicheng 17'

Mong Kok Stadium
Attendance: 751
Referee: Wong Chi Tang

20 January 2007
16:00

Lanwa Redbull	1 - 1	Eastern
Aldo Villalba 45'	(in chinese)	Rodrigo 54'

Mong Kok Stadium
Attendance: 751
Referee: Ching Oi Jo

27 January 2008
14:00

Bulova Rangers	3 - 0	Lanwa Redbull
Chan Ho Man 9' 89'; Caleb Ekwenugo 72'	(in chinese)

Mong Kok Stadium
Attendance: 631
Referee: Cheung Yim Yau

27 January 2008
16:00

Eastern	1 - 1	Convoy Sun Hei
Wong Yiu Fu 35'	(in chinese)	Batoum Roger 54'

Mong Kok Stadium
Attendance: 631
Referee: Ng Chiu Kok

31 January 2008
18:00

Convoy Sun Hei	1 - 1	Bulova Rangers
Chan Yiu Lun 84'	(in chinese)	Edson Minga 3'

Mong Kok Stadium
Attendance: 199
Referee: Wong Po On

31 January 2008
20:00

Lanwa Redbull	1 - 1	Citizen
David Godwin 14'	(in chinese)	Wang Xuanhong 65'

Mong Kok Stadium
Attendance: 199
Referee: Ng Chiu Kok

16 February 2008
14:00

Bulova Rangers	1 - 2	Eastern
Caleb Ekwenugo 51'	(in chinese)	Rodrigo 46' 76'

Mong Kok Stadium
Attendance: 969
Referee: Ng Kai Lam

16 February 2008
16:00

Citizen	0 - 2	Convoy Sun Hei
	(in chinese)	Giovane 11' 78'

Mong Kok Stadium
Attendance: 969
Referee: Fung Ka Yu

19 February 2008
18:00

Convoy Sun Hei	3 - 0	Lanwa Redbull
Giovane 31' 43' 75'	(in chinese)

Mong Kok Stadium
Attendance: 371
Referee: Liu Kwok Man

19 February 2008
20:00

Eastern	0 - 0	Citizen
	(in chinese)

Mong Kok Stadium
Attendance: 371
Referee: Wong Po On

== Knockout stage ==
All times are Hong Kong Time (UTC+8).

=== Bracket ===
Semifinals
A1	South China	1
B2	Eastern	0
A2	Kitchee	2
B1	Convoy Sun Hei	0

Finals
South China	4
Kitchee	2

=== Semi-finals ===
2 March 2008
14:00

Kitchee	2 - 0	Convoy Sun Hei
Goran Stankovski 55'; Cheung Kin Fung 67'	(in chinese)

Mong Kok Stadium
Attendance: 4,403
Referee: Ching Oi Jo

2 March 2008
16:00

South China	1 - 0	Eastern
Detinho 88'	(in chinese)

Mong Kok Stadium
Attendance: 4,403
Referee: Cheung Yim Yau

=== Final ===
24 March 2008
15:00

South China	4 - 2	Kitchee
Li Haiqiang 50'; Detinho 59' 64' 87' (PEN.)	(in chinese)	Liu Quankun 17'; Wilfed Bamnjo 84'

Mong Kok Stadium
Attendance: 4,630
Referee: Ng Chiu Kok

== Scorers ==
5 goals

- (Brazil) Giovane (Convoy Sun Hei)

4 goals

- (Brazil) Detinho (South China)
- (Brazil) Maxwell (South China)

3 goals

- (Brazil) Rodrigo (Eastern)
- (Brazil) Tales Schutz (South China)

2 goals

- (Nigeria) Caleb Ekwenugo (Bulova Rangers)
- (Hong Kong) Chan Ho Man (Bulova Rangers)
- (China) Wang Xuanhong (Citizen)
- (Hong Kong) Poon Yiu Cheuk (Happy Valley)
- (Hong Kong) Chan Siu Ki (Kitchee)
- (North Macedonia) Goran Stankovski (Kitchee)
- (Cameroon) Wilfed Bamnjo (Kitchee)

1 goal

- (Brazil) Edson Minga (Bulova Rangers)
- (China) Liang Zicheng (Bulova Rangers)
- (Cameroon) Batoum Roger (Convoy Sun Hei)
- (Hong Kong) Chan Yiu Lun (Convoy Sun Hei)
- (Hong Kong) Wong Yiu Fu (Eastern)
- (Brazil) Denisson (Happy Valley)
- (Ghana) Godfred Karikari (Happy Valley)
- (Hong Kong) Law Chun Bong (Happy Valley)
- (Hong Kong) Sham Kwok Keung (Happy Valley)
- (Hong Kong) Cheung Kin Fung (Kitchee)
- (Cameroon) Ewane Ngassa (Kitchee)
- (Cameroon) Hugues Nanmi (Kitchee)
- (Serbia) Ivan Jević (Kitchee)
- (Cameroon) Julius Akosah (Kitchee)
- (Hong Kong) Liu Quankun (Kitchee)
- (Hong Kong) Lo Kwan Yee (Kitchee)
- (Paraguay) Aldo Villalba (Lanwa Redbull)
- David Godwin (Lanwa Redbull)
- Fan Weijun (South China)
- (Brazil) Itaparica (South China)
- Li Haiqiang (South China)
- (Brazil) Rafael (Wofoo Tai Po)
- (China) Ye Jia (Wofoo Tai Po)
- (Hong Kong) Wong Chun Yue (Workable)
- (Brazil) Roberto Fronza (Workable)

== Individual prizes ==
- Top Scorer Award: (Brazil) Giovane (Convoy Sun Hei)
- Best Player Award: (Brazil) Rodrigo (Eastern)

== See also ==
- Hong Kong League Cup
- The Hong Kong Football Association
- Hong Kong FA Cup 2007-08
- Hong Kong First Division League 2007-08
- Hong Kong Senior Shield 2007-08
