= 2007–08 Hong Kong Senior Shield =

Tournament details
- Country: Hong Kong
- Teams: 10

Final positions
- Champions: Eastern AA (8th title)
- Runners-up: Kitchee

Tournament statistics
- Matches played: 9
- Goals scored: 29 (3.22 per match)
- Attendance: 21,997 (2,444 per match)
- Top goal scorer: (Brazil) Rodrigo (Eastern AA) (6 goals)

The Hong Kong Senior Shield 2007–08, also known as the 2007–08 HKFA Choi Fung Hong Senior Shield, was the 106th staging of the Hong Kong's oldest football knockout competition.

The competition started on 22 November 2007 with 10 Hong Kong First Division clubs and concluded on 23 December 2007 with the final.

Eastern captured their 7th title of the competition after beating Kitchee by 3-1 in the final. They qualified for the 2009 AFC Cup.

== Teams ==
- Bulova Rangers
- Citizen
- Convoy Sun Hei
- Eastern
- Happy Valley
- Kitchee
- Lanwa Redbull
- South China
- Wofoo Tai Po
- Workable

== Fixtures and results ==
All times are Hong Kong Time (UTC+8).

=== Bracket ===
First round
Bulova Rangers	2
Workable	0
Happy Valley	2
Wofoo Tai Po	1

Quarter-finals
South China	4
Bulova Rangers	0
Kitchee	5
Lanwa Redbull	0
Citizen	1
Eastern	3
Happy Valley	3
Convoy Sun Hei	0

Semi-finals
South China	1
Kitchee	2
Eastern (a.e.t.)	0 (1)
Happy Valley	0 (0)

Final
Kitchee	1
Eastern	3

=== First round ===
22 November 2007
18:00

Bulova Rangers	2–0	Workable
Siumar 26' (PEN.); Godfred 90'	(in chinese)

Mong Kok Stadium
Attendance: 600
Referee: Fung Ka Yu

22 November 2007
20:00

Happy Valley	2–1	Wofoo Tai Po
Denisson 34'; Tomy 41'	(in chinese)	Lee Wai Lim 84'

Mong Kok Stadium
Attendance: 600
Referee: Liu Kwok Man

=== Quarter-finals ===
24 November 2007
14:00

Kitchee	5–0	Lanwa Redbull
Wilfed Bamnjo 22'; Julius Akosah 31'; Goran Stankovski 58'; Chan Siu Ki 68'; Li Yao 90' (PEN.)	(in chinese)

Mong Kok Stadium
Attendance: 1,297
Referee: Ng Kai Lam

24 November 2007
16:00

Citizen	1–3	Eastern
Chen Zhizhao 48'	(in chinese)	Rodrigo 27' 78' 90'

Mong Kok Stadium
Attendance: 1,297
Referee: Wong Po On

25 November 2007
14:00

Convoy Sun Hei	0–3	Happy Valley
	(in chinese)	Sham Kwok Keung 34' 85'; Fagner Gomes Dos Santos 57'

Mong Kok Stadium
Attendance: 2,597
Referee: Fung Ka Yu

25 November 2007
16:00

South China	4–0	Bulova Rangers
Kwok Kin Pong 5'; Detinho 60' (PEN.) 84'; Yip Chi Ho 86'	(in chinese)

Mong Kok Stadium
Attendance: 2,597
Referee: Ng Chiu Kok

=== Semi-finals ===
8 December 2007
14:00

Eastern	1–0 (AET)	Happy Valley
Rodrigo 119'	(in chinese)

Mong Kok Stadium
Attendance: 5,258
Referee: Ng Kai Lam

8 December 2007
16:00

Kitchee	2–1	South China
Lo Kwan Yee 23'; Goran Stankovski 46'	(in chinese)	Detinho 49'

Mong Kok Stadium
Attendance: 5,258
Referee: Ng Chiu Kok

=== Final ===
23 December 2007
15:00

Eastern	3–1	Kitchee
Fabio 13'; Rodrigo 72' 90'	(in chinese)	Lo Kwan Yee 26'

Hong Kong Stadium
Attendance: 2,493
Referee: Wong Po On

== Scorers ==
6 goals

- (Brazil) Rodrigo (Eastern)

3 goals

- (Brazil) Detinho (South China)

2 goals

- (Hong Kong) Sham Kwok Keung (Happy Valley)
- (North Macedonia) Goran Stankovski (Kitchee)
- (Hong Kong) Lo Kwan Yee (Kitchee)

1 goal

- (Ghana) Godfred Karikari (Bulova Rangers)
- (Brazil) Siumar (Bulova Rangers)
- (China) Chen Zhizhao (Citizen)
- (Brazil) Fabio (Eastern)
- (Brazil) Denisson (Happy Valley)
- (Brazil) Fagner (Happy Valley)
- (Brazil) Tomy (Happy Valley)
- (Hong Kong) Chan Siu Ki (Kitchee)
- (Cameroon) Julius Akosah (Kitchee)
- (China) Li Yao (Kitchee)
- (Cameroon) Wilfed Bamnjo (Kitchee)
- (Hong Kong) Kwok Kin Pong (South China)
- (Hong Kong) Yip Chi Ho (South China)
- (Hong Kong) Lee Wai Lim (Wofoo Tai Po)

== Prizes ==
=== Teamwise ===
- Champion (HKD$80,000): Eastern
- 1st-Runner-up (HKD$20,000): Kitchee
- Knock-out in the Semi-Finals (HKD$10,000 each): Happy Valley, South China
- Knock-out in the Preliminary (HKD$5,000 each): Bulova Rangers, Citizen, Convoy Sun Hei, Lanwa Redbull, Wofoo Tai Po, Workable

=== Individual ===
- Top Scorer Award (HKD$5,000): Rodrigo Andreis Galvao (Eastern)
- Best Defender Award (HKD$5,000): Luciano (Eastern)

== Trivia ==
- Eastern head coach Casemiro Mior captured the Hong Kong Senior Shield for the 5th time. For the last four times, he led another First Division League team South China, including for the last season in 2006-07.
- Originally, Eastern should have regulated to the Third 'A' Division League for the 2007-08 season, and therefore unqualified for competing in Senior Shield. However, the team was invited to enter the First Division and was able to compete in Senior Shield. This was similar to the case happened in the previous season for the champion team South China, as South China should have regulated to the Second Division League and unqualified for Senior Shield.

== See also ==
- Hong Kong Senior Shield
- The Hong Kong Football Association
- Hong Kong FA Cup 2007-08
- Hong Kong First Division League 2007-08
- Hong Kong League Cup 2007-08
