= 2007–08 in Hong Kong football =

National football season in Hong Kong

The 2007–08 season in Hong Kong football, starting July 2007 and ending June 2008:

== Overview ==
- Hong Kong 08 was dissolved as Hong Kong was knocked out from the 2008 Summer Olympics qualification.
- Tung Po, the 2006-07 Second Division champion refused to promote while the runner-up Shek Kip Mei promoted and renamed to Workable.
- Eastern was to be relegated from Second Division to Third 'A' Division by rule but was subsequently invited to promote to First Division after obtaining sufficient sponsorship

== Representative team ==
=== Hong Kong team ===
Hong Kong have gone through their 2010 FIFA World Cup qualifying campaign, where they were knocked out in the Second Round.

Date	Venue	Opponents	Score^{1}	Comp	Hong Kong scorers	Match Report(s)
21 October 2007	Gianyar Stadium, Bali (A)	Timor-Leste	3–2	WCQ	Cheng Siu Wai (2)	FIFA
28 October 2007	Hong Kong Stadium (H)	Timor-Leste	8–1	WCQ	Lo Kwan Yee; Chan Siu Ki (2); Cheung Sai Ho; Cheng Siu Wai (2); Lam Ka Wai	FIFA
10 November 2007	Hong Kong Stadium (H)	Turkmenistan	0–0	WCQ		FIFA
18 November 2007	Olympic Stadium (Ashkhabad) (A)	Turkmenistan	0–3	WCQ		FIFA

=== Hong Kong national under-23 football team ===
Hong Kong national under-23 football team this season is preparing for the 2009 East Asian Games to be hosted in Hong Kong.

Date	Venue	Opponents	Score^{1}	Comp	Hong Kong scorers	Match Report(s)
29 May 2008	Stadion Radnika, Velika Gorica (A)	(Croatia) NK Radnik	1–4	F	Kwok Kin Pong	HKFA (in Chinese)
2 June 2008	Zagreb (A)	(Croatia) NK Zagreb	2–4	F	Yu Ho Pong; Kwok Kin Pong	HKFA (in Chinese)
4 June 2008	Stadion Varteks, Varaždin (A)	(Croatia) NK Varteks	1–3	F	Lau Ka Shing	HKFA (in Chinese)
10 June 2008	Zagreb (A)	(Croatia) NK Zagreb	0–4	F	–	HKFA (in Chinese)
11 June 2008	?	(Croatia) NK Mladost Buzin	5–2	F	Lau Ka Shing (2); Lam Wan Kit; Yeung Chi Lun (2)	HKFA (in Chinese)
15 June 2008	Macau (A)	Macau	1–0	HK-Macau	So Wai Chuen	HKFA (in Chinese)
22 June 2008	Hangzhou (N)	(South Korea) Jeollanam-do	3–0	F	Lau Ka Shing; Yu Ho Pong; Chan Ka Chun	HKFA (in Chinese)
24 June 2008	Hangzhou (N)	(China) Hangzhou Sanchao	0–5	F		HKFA (in Chinese)

^{1} Hong Kong's score comes first.

== Honours ==
Competition	Winner	Details	Match Report
First Division	South China	First Division 2007–08	
Senior Shield	Eastern	Senior Shield 2007–08	
FA Cup	Citizen	FA Cup 2007–08	
League Cup	South China	League Cup 2007–08	
Second Division	Mutual	Second Division 2007–08	
Third 'A' Division	Wing Yee		
Third 'District' Division	Shatin		

== Asian clubs competitions ==
=== AFC Cup 2007 ===
- Happy Valley - group stage
- Xiangxue Sun Hei / Convoy Sun Hei - quarter-final

=== AFC Cup 2008 ===
- Kitchee - group stage
- South China - group stage

== Hong Kong Top Footballer Awards ==
=== Hong Kong Top Footballer ===
- Li Haiqiang (South China)

=== Fans' Player of the Year ===
- (Hong Kong) Lee Chi Ho (South China)

=== Hong Kong Footballer Awards (Best XI) ===
Position	Nationality	Name	Club
GK	(Brazil)	Luciano	Eastern
DF	(Hong Kong)	Cristiano Cordeiro	Convoy Sun Hei
DF	(Nigeria)	Festus Baise	Citizen
DF	(Hong Kong)	Lee Chi Ho	South China
MF	(Brazil)	Edgar Aldrighi Júnior	Wofoo Tai Po
MF	(North Macedonia)	Goran Stankovski	Kitchee
MF	(China)	Li Haiqiang	South China
FW	(Brazil)	Detinho	South China
FW	(Brazil)	Giovane	Convoy Sun Hei
FW	(Brazil)	Rodrigo	Eastern
FW	(China)	Wang Xuanhong	Citizen

=== Best Youth Player ===
- (Hong Kong) Kwok Kin Pong (South China)
- (Hong Kong) Lo Chun Kit (Eastern)

=== Coach of the Year ===
- (Hong Kong) Liu Chun Fai (Citizen)

== Exhibition Matches ==
=== Mission Hills Cup ===
11 August 2007
14:30

Mission Hills Invitation XI (Happy Valley–Kitchee Union)	0–4	FC Barcelona
	(in Chinese)	Xavi 22'; Eto'o 28'; Henry 36'; Giovani 83'

Hong Kong Stadium, Hong Kong
Attendance: 23,792

=== The Citizen Athletic Association 60th Anniversary Invitation Football Match ===
Citizen organized an exhibition competition on 22 August 2007 for celebrating the 60th Anniversary of the club. It featured two matches including the host Citizen against Guangdong, and another Hong Kong team South China versus J. League team Vissel Kobe.

- Citizen vs Guangdong
22 August 2007
18:15

Citizen	0-1	Guangdong
		Li Jiagi 62'

Hong Kong Stadium, Hong Kong
Attendance: 4,413

- South China vs Vissel Kobe
22 August 2007
20:30

South China	2-0	Vissel Kobe
Yip Chi Ho 27'; Li Haiqiang 74'

Hong Kong Stadium, Hong Kong
Attendance: 4,413

=== LA Galaxy HK Invitation Football Match ===
9 March 2008
15:00

SCAA Invitation Team (Hong Kong Union)	2 – 2	Los Angeles Galaxy
Detinho 45'; Li 90' (pen.)	Report (HKFA); Report (LA Galaxy)	Gordon 61'; Beckham 90' (pen.)
Penalties
Giovane (penalty scored); Yeung (penalty scored); Baise (penalty scored); Maxwell (penalty scored); Li (penalty scored)	5–4	(penalty scored) Beckham; (penalty missed) Vanney; (penalty scored) Vagenas; (penalty scored) Xavier; (penalty scored) Gordon

Hong Kong Stadium, Hong Kong
Attendance: 14,060
Referee: Cheung Yim Yau

=== CASH 10th Anniversary Soccer Day ===
- Pok Oi Hospital Charity Cup
22 May 2008
18:00

South China Invitation Team	3 - 1	Manchester City
Giovane 27'; Baise 48'; Liang 71'	(HKFA Report) (MCFC Report)	Hamann 15'

Hong Kong Stadium, Hong Kong
Attendance: 17,516
Referee: Ng Kai Lam

- CASH 10th Anniversary Cup
22 May 2008
20:30

South China	2 - 1	Juventus
Itaparica 23'; Detinho 45'	(HKFA Report) (Juventus.com)	Zebina 88'

Hong Kong Stadium, Hong Kong
Attendance: 17,516
Referee: Ng Chiu Kok
