= 2007–08 Hong Kong First Division League =

Hong Kong First Division
- Season: 2007–08
- Champions: South China; 38th Hong Kong title
- Relegated: Bulova Rangers
- AFC Cup: South China (group stage); Eastern (group stage)
- Matches played: 90
- Goals scored: 282 (3.13 per match)
- Top goalscorer: Detinho (South China) (19)
- Biggest home win: South China 6 – 1 Workable (26 September 2007); South China 6 – 1 Wofoo Tai Po (13 November 2007)
- Biggest away win: Bulova Rangers 1–9 South China (2 November 2007)
- Highest scoring: Bulova Rangers 1–9 South China (2 November 2007)
- Longest winning run: South China (7 games)
- Longest unbeaten run: South China (12 games)
- Longest losing run: Bulova Rangers, Workable, Lanwa Redbull (3 games)
- Highest attendance: Workable 1 – 3 Kitchee; Eastern 0 – 2 South China (4397) (22 September 2007)
- Lowest attendance: Happy Valley 0 – 0 Lanwa Redbull (117) (18 April 2008)
- Average attendance: 1305(except home matches of Lanwa Redbull)

The 2007–08 Hong Kong First Division League season was the 96th since its establishment. The first match was played on 2 September 2007 with South China lost to Kitchee 1–2.

In this season, the First Division League was composed of 10 teams. Workable were promoted from the Second Division while Eastern, originally demoted to Third Division League by rule, was invited by HKFA to play in the First Division League after securing sufficient sponsorship.

== League table ==
=== Full table ===
Pos	Team	Pld	W	D	L	GF	GA	GD	Pts	Qualification or relegation
1	South China (C)	18	11	3	4	51	17	+34	36	2009 AFC Cup Group stage
2	Citizen	18	10	4	4	31	22	+9	34	
3	Wofoo Tai Po	18	7	6	5	36	37	−1	27	
4	Happy Valley	18	5	9	4	25	22	+3	24	
5	Convoy Sun Hei	18	5	8	5	26	23	+3	23	
6	Kitchee	18	5	7	6	30	33	−3	22	
7	Eastern	18	4	8	6	25	28	−3	20	2009 AFC Cup Group stage (Note: via 2007–08 Hong Kong Senior Shield)
8	Lanwa Redbull	18	4	8	6	25	31	−6	20	
9	Workable	18	3	6	9	14	34	−20	15	
10	Bulova Rangers (R)	18	2	9	7	19	35	−16	15	Relegation to Second Division

Source: HKFA.com
Rules for classification: 1) points; 2) goal difference; 3) number of goals scored.
(C) Champions; (R) Relegated
Notes:

First Division League 2007–08 winners
South China
38th title

=== Home matches only ===
Pos	Team	Pld	W	D	L	GF	GA	GD	Pts
1	Citizen	9	5	2	2	15	12	+3	17
2	Wofoo Tai Po	9	6	1	2	24	18	+6	17
3	South China	9	5	2	2	23	8	+15	17
4	Bulova Rangers	9	2	5	2	9	18	−9	11
5	Eastern	9	2	3	4	12	15	−3	9
6	Kitchee	9	2	3	4	13	18	−5	9
7	Lanwa Redbull	9	1	5	3	12	17	−5	8
8	Convoy Sun Hei	9	1	4	4	9	12	−3	7
9	Happy Valley	9	0	7	2	8	11	−3	7
10	Workable	9	2	1	6	9	22	−13	7

Note: Here is the home stadium list of the teams:

- Dongguan Stadium – Lanwa Redbull
- Hong Kong Stadium & Mong Kok Stadium – Rest of the teams

=== Away matches only ===
Pos	Team	Pld	W	D	L	GF	GA	GD	Pts
1	South China	9	6	1	2	28	9	+19	19
2	Happy Valley	9	5	1	3	17	11	+6	17
3	Citizen	9	5	2	2	16	10	+6	17
4	Convoy Sun Hei	9	4	4	1	17	11	+6	16
5	Kitchee	9	3	4	2	17	15	+2	13
6	Lanwa Redbull	9	3	3	3	13	14	−1	12
7	Eastern	9	2	5	2	13	13	0	11
8	Wofoo Tai Po	9	2	4	3	14	19	−5	10
9	Workable	9	1	5	3	5	13	−8	8
10	Bulova Rangers	9	0	4	5	10	17	−7	4

== Teams ==
The following 10 clubs are competing in the Hong Kong First Division League during the 2007–08 season.

Club	Position in 2006–07	First season in top division	Last title
Bulova Rangers	4th	1965–66	1970–71
Citizen	8th	2004–05	n/a
Convoy Sun Hei	3rd	1994–95	2004–05
Eastern	10th, Second Division	1936–37	1994–95
Happy Valley	6th	1959–60	2005–06
Kitchee	2nd	1947–48	1963–64
Lanwa Redbull	5th	2005–06	n/a
South China	1st	1918–19	2006–07
Wofoo Tai Po	7th	2006–07	n/a
Workable	2nd, Second Division	2007–08	n/a

== Kits ==
Team	Kit maker	Sponsor
Bulova Rangers	Umbro	Bulova
Citizen	Jako	BMA Entertainment
Convoy Sun Hei	Kappa	Aviva
Eastern	Adidas	Panasonic
Happy Valley	Puma	Alliance Engineering
Kitchee	Mizuno	Canon
Lanwa Redbull	Umbro	Huangshan Wenquan
South China	Adidas	PCCW
Wofoo Tai Po	Akita	Yashica
Workable	Adidas	Crocodile Garments

== Fixtures and results ==
- All times are Hong Kong Time (UTC+8).

=== Round 1 ===
2 September 2007
15:15

South China	1–2	Kitchee
Li Haiqiang 58'	(Report)	Chan Siu Ki 79' (pen.); Anderson 82'

Hong Kong Stadium
Attendance: 3,141
Referee: Fung Ka Yu
8 September 2007
14:00

Workable	2–2	Wofoo Tai Po
Beto 75' 90' (pen.)	(Report)	Chan Sze Wing 33'; Annan 58'

Mong Kok Stadium
Attendance: 2,453
Referee: Cheng Oi Cho
8 September 2007
16:00

Eastern	0–2	Convoy Sun Hei
	(Report)	Giovane 48' (pen.) 53'

Mong Kok Stadium
Attendance: 2,453
Referee: Liu Kwok Man
9 September 2007
14:00

Citizen	0–0	Lanwa Redbull
	(Report)

Mong Kok Stadium
Attendance: 1,191
Referee: Ng Chiu Kok
9 September 2007
16:00

Happy Valley	1–1	Bulova Rangers
Chao Pengfei 55'	(Report)	Godfred 62'

Mong Kok Stadium
Attendance: 1,191
Referee: Wong Po On

=== Round 2 ===
14 September 2007
20:00

Convoy Sun Hei	0–0	Workable
	(Report)

Mong Kok Stadium
Attendance: 511
Referee: Ng Kai Lam
15 September 2007
14:00

Lanwa Redbull	1–3	South China
Lin Zhong 90'	(Report)	Detinho 10' 24'; Maxwell 36'

Dongguan Stadium
Referee: Wong Chi Tang
15 September 2007
16:00

Wofoo Tai Po	4–3	Happy Valley
Leung Kam Fai 21'; Junior 39' (pen.) 68'; Annan 58'	(Report)	Tomy 45' 62'; Law Chun Bong 82'

Mong Kok Stadium
Attendance: 588
Referee: Fung Ka Yu
16 September 2007
14:00

Bulova Rangers	0–4	Citizen
	(Report)	Wang Xuanhong 17' 68' 73' 81'

Mong Kok Stadium
Attendance: 1,638
Referee: Pau Sai Yin
16 September 2007
16:00

Kitchee	2–2	Eastern
Cheung Kin Fung 27'; Anderson 40'	(Report)	Paulo 6' (pen.); Rodrigo 15'

Mong Kok Stadium
Attendance: 1,638
Referee: Liu Kwok Man

=== Round 3 ===
21 September 2007
20:00

Happy Valley	2–3	Convoy Sun Hei
Diego 16'; Poon Man Tik 27'	(Report)	Fabio Herbert 18'; João Miguel 25'; Giovane 64'

Mong Kok Stadium
Attendance: 560
Referee: Wong Chi Tang
22 September 2007
14:00

Workable	1–3	Kitchee
Au Yeung Yiu Chung 12'	(Report)	Goran 6' 50'; Chan Siu Ki 85'

Mong Kok Stadium
Attendance: 4,397
Referee: Wong Po On
22 September 2007
16:00

Eastern	0–2	South China
	(Report)	Maxwell 74'; Cheng Siu Wai 79'

Mong Kok Stadium
Attendance: 4,397
Referee: Chan Shui Hung
23 September 2007
14:00

Citizen	2–1	Wofoo Tai Po
Sham Kwok Fai 52'; Wang Xuanhong 75'	(Report)	Joel 71'

Mong Kok Stadium
Attendance: 554
Referee: Pau Sai Yin
23 September 2007
16:00

Bulova Rangers	3–2	Lanwa Redbull
Liang Zicheng 3'; Yaw 37'; Godfred 69'	(Report)	Willian 14'; Lin Zhong 74'

Mong Kok Stadium
Attendance: 554
Referee: Cheng Oi Cho

=== Round 4 ===
26 September 2007
15:00

South China	6–1	Workable
Maxwell 10'; Itaparica 32'; Detinho 62' 89' (pen.) 90'; Cris 85'	(Report)	Au Yeung Yiu Chung 58'

Hong Kong Stadium
Attendance: 1,892
Referee: Ng Chiu Kok
29 September 2007
15:00

Lanwa Redbull	0–2	Eastern
	(Report)	Ferreira 67'; Paulo 70' (pen.)

Dongguan Stadium
Referee: Cheng Oi Cho
29 September 2007
15:00

Wofoo Tai Po	2–0	Bulova Rangers
Annan 25'; Rafael 46'	(Report)

Mong Kok Stadium
Attendance: 473
Referee: Chan Shui Hung
30 September 2007
14:00

Convoy Sun Hei	3–2	Citizen
Lau Chi Keung 24'; Giovane 44' 51'	(Report)	Leko 14'; Sham Kwok Fai 29'

Mong Kok Stadium
Attendance: 2,218
Referee: Wong Chi Tang
30 September 2007
16:00

Kitchee	3–3	Happy Valley
Chan Siu Ki 11'; Cheng Lai Hin 72'; Zizic 90'	(Report)	Tomy 18'; Diego 43'; Monteiro 85'

Mong Kok Stadium
Attendance: 2,218
Referee: Ng Chiu Kok

=== Round 5 ===
5 October 2007
20:00

Happy Valley	1–1	South China
Tomy 39'	(Report)	Detinho 66'

Mong Kok Stadium
Attendance: 2,489
Referee: Wong Chi Tang
6 October 2007
14:00

Wofoo Tai Po	2–4	Lanwa Redbull
Zhang Yu 58' (o.g.); Joel 83'	(Report)	Wang Gang 10'; Lin Zhong 43'; Yang Baoming 45'; Zhang Yu 86'

Mong Kok Stadium
Attendance: 853
Referee: Ng Chiu Kok
6 October 2007
16:00

Bulova Rangers	0–0	Convoy Sun Hei
	(Report)

Mong Kok Stadium
Attendance: 853
Referee: Ng Kai Lam
7 October 2007
14:00

Citizen	2–1	Kitchee
Leko 3'; Márcio Bambu 75'	(Report)	Goran 53'

Mong Kok Stadium
Attendance: 1,155
Referee: Wong Po On
7 October 2007
16:00

Workable	0–2	Eastern
	(Report)	Rodrigo 74'; Jeferson 90'

Mong Kok Stadium
Attendance: 1,155
Referee: Liu Kwok Man

=== Round 6 ===
13 October 2007
14:00

Eastern	1–2	Happy Valley
Rodrigo 81'	(Report)	Poon Yiu Cheuk 37' (pen.) 56' (pen.)

Mong Kok Stadium
Attendance: 3,609
Referee: Fung Ka Yu
13 October 2007
15:00

Lanwa Redbull	1–1	Workable
Villalba 61'	(Report)	Chan Man Fai 82'

Dongguan Stadium
Referee: Ng Kai Lam
13 October 2007
16:00

South China	0–0	Citizen
	(Report)

Mong Kok Stadium
Attendance: 3,609
Referee: Liu Kwok Man
14 October 2007
14:00

Convoy Sun Hei	1–2	Wofoo Tai Po
Giovane 85' (pen.)	(Report)	Annan 67'; Joel 82'

Mong Kok Stadium
Attendance: 1,132
Referee: Pau Sai Yin
14 October 2007
16:00

Kitchee	3–1	Bulova Rangers
Chan Siu Ki 29'; Akosah 45'; McKee 81'	(Report)	Liang Zicheng 10'

Mong Kok Stadium
Attendance: 1,132
Referee: Wong Po On

=== Round 7 ===
17 October 2007
18:00

Happy Valley	0–0	Workable
	(Report)

Mong Kok Stadium
Attendance: 540
Referee: Wong Po On
17 October 2007
20:00

Convoy Sun Hei	0–1	Lanwa Redbull
	(Report)	Ye Nan 33'

Mong Kok Stadium
Attendance: 540
Referee: Fung Ka Yu
1 November 2007
18:00

Wofoo Tai Po	3–3	Kitchee
Junior 21' (pen.) 41' (pen.); Joel 61'	(Report)	Liu Quankun 9'; Lo Kwan Yee 62'; Anderson 66'

Mong Kok Stadium
Attendance: 677
Referee: Liu Kwok Man
1 November 2007
20:00

Citizen	2–2	Eastern
Wang Xuanhong 52' 90'	(Report)	Machado 1'; Jeferson 4'

Mong Kok Stadium
Attendance: 677
Referee: Cheng Oi Cho
2 November 2007
20:00

Bulova Rangers	1–9	South China
Godfred 41'	(Report)	Detinho 4' 23' 60'; Kwok Kin Pong 25' 67'; Maxwell 28' 86'; Li Haiqiang 30' 70'

Mong Kok Stadium
Attendance: 1,196
Referee: Ng Kai Lam

=== Round 8 ===
3 November 2007
15:00

Lanwa Redbull	3–2	Happy Valley
Anibal 50'; Willian 61'; Zhang Yu 76'	(Report)	Tomy 32'; Diego 45'

Dongguan Stadium
Referee: Wong Chi Tang
5 November 2007
20:00

Kitchee	1–1	Convoy Sun Hei
Chan Siu Ki 7' (pen.)	(Report)	Giovane 88'

Mong Kok Stadium
Attendance: 581
Referee: Ng Chiu Kok
11 November 2007
14:00

Workable	0–1	Citizen
	(Report)	Ju Yingzhi 57'

Mong Kok Stadium
Attendance: 883
Referee: Wong Po On
11 November 2007
16:00

Eastern	4–3	Bulova Rangers
Rodrigo 17'; Paulo 36' (pen.) 48' (pen.) 72' (pen.)	(Report)	Liang Zicheng 56'; Marcio 76' (o.g.); Fofo 90'

Mong Kok Stadium
Attendance: 883
Referee: Ng Chiu Kok
13 November 2007
20:00

South China	6–1	Wofoo Tai Po
Kwok Kin Pong 4'; Detinho 14' 31' (pen.); Maxwell 56' 80' 84'	(Report)	Lee Wai Lim 42'

Hong Kong Stadium
Attendance: 1,558
Referee: Pau Sai Yin

=== Round 9 ===
29 November 2007
20:00

Convoy Sun Hei	1–2	South China
Chan Ho Man 90'	(Report)	Detinho 59'; Maxwell 86'

Mong Kok Stadium
Attendance: 1,531
Referee: Liu Kwok Man
30 November 2007
18:00

Bulova Rangers	0–0	Workable
	(Report)

Mong Kok Stadium
Attendance: 376
Referee: Lam Sing Yan
30 November 2007
20:00

Kitchee	2–3	Lanwa Redbull
Chan Siu Ki 54'; Goran 90'	(Report)	Villalba 45' 46'; Li Hang Wui 90' (o.g.)

Mong Kok Stadium
Attendance: 376
Referee: Wong Po On
2 December 2007
14:00

Citizen	0–3	Happy Valley
	(Report)	Tomy 13'; Sham Kwok Keung 22'; Poon Yiu Cheuk 79'

Mong Kok Stadium
Attendance: 1,466
Referee: Chan Shui Hung
2 December 2007
16:00

Wofoo Tai Po	0–1	Eastern
	(The result was declared null)	Picoli 51'

Mong Kok Stadium
Attendance: 1,466
Referee: Pau Sai Yin
8 January 2008
20:00

Wofoo Tai Po	3–1	Eastern
Rafael 19'; Junior 45'; Annan 76'	(Re-match) (Report)	Lee Sze Ming 4'

Mong Kok Stadium
Attendance: 461
Referee: Ng Chiu Kok

=== Round 10 ===
14 December 2007
20:00

Kitchee	0–5	South China
	(Report)	Itaparica 29'; Detinho 30' 39' 46' 79'

Mong Kok Stadium
Attendance: 2,082
Referee: Cheng Oi Cho
15 December 2007
14:00

Wofoo Tai Po	2–1	Workable
Rafael 24' 66'	(Report)	Wong Chun Yue 1'

Mong Kok Stadium
Attendance: 898
Referee: Chan Shui Hung
15 December 2007
15:00

Lanwa Redbull	1–1	Citizen
Anibal 53' (pen.)	(Report)	Wang Xuanhong 45'

Dongguan Stadium
Referee: Wong Po On
15 December 2007
16:00

Convoy Sun Hei	1–1	Eastern
Miguel 50'	(Report)	Fabio 76'

Mong Kok Stadium
Attendance: 898
Referee: Liu Kwok Man
16 December 2007
15:00

Bulova Rangers	0–0	Happy Valley
	(Report)

Mong Kok Stadium
Attendance: 433
Referee: Fung Ka Yu

=== Round 11 ===
11 January 2008
20:00

South China	4–1	Lanwa Redbull
Cheng Siu Wai 32'; Cris 76'; Chan Wai Ho 85'; Itaparica 90'	(Report)	Geng Xin 4'

Mong Kok Stadium
Attendance: 976
Referee: Cheng Oi Cho
12 January 2008
14:00

Eastern	1–1	Kitchee
Fabio 42'	(Report)	Goran 14'

Mong Kok Stadium
Attendance: 992
Referee: Ng Kai Lam
12 January 2008
16:00

Workable	1–6	Convoy Sun Hei
Beto 32' (pen.)	(Report)	Roger 8'; Pizzi 10'; Giovane 18' 20' 36'; Chan Yiu Lun 75'

Mong Kok Stadium
Attendance: 992
Referee: Liu Kwok Man
13 January 2008
14:00

Happy Valley	1–1	Wofoo Tai Po
Sham Kwok Keung 45'	(Report)	Annan 58'

Mong Kok Stadium
Attendance: 1,089
Referee: Wong Po On
13 January 2008
16:00

Citizen	3–2	Bulova Rangers
Wang Xuanhong 14' 60'; Leko 53'	(Report)	Siumar 21' (pen.); Donatus 70'

Mong Kok Stadium
Attendance: 1,089
Referee: Fung Ka Yu

=== Round 12 ===
22 February 2008
20:00

Wofoo Tai Po	2–3	Citizen
Junior 25' (pen.); Rafael 90'	(Report)	Chiu Chun Kit 4' (o.g.); Leko 5' 16'

Mong Kok Stadium
Attendance: 185
Referee: Lui Siu Chuen
23 February 2008
14:00

Kitchee	0–1	Workable
	(Report)	Chan Man Fai 58'

Mong Kok Stadium
Attendance: 750
Referee: Ng Kai Lam
23 February 2008
16:00

Convoy Sun Hei	0–1	Happy Valley
	(Report)	Chao Pengfei 22'

Mong Kok Stadium
Attendance: 750
Referee: Wong Chi Tang
24 February 2008
15:00

South China	2–0	Eastern
Schutz 13' 15'	(Report)

Mong Kok Stadium
Attendance: 1,097
Referee: Wong Po On
24 February 2008
15:00

Lanwa Redbull	2–2	Bulova Rangers
Villalba 31'; Lin Zhong 69'	(Report)	Liang Zicheng 6'; Caleb 62'

Dongguan Stadium
Referee: Cheung Yim Yau

=== Round 13 ===
7 March 2008
20:00

Happy Valley	0–0	Kitchee
	(Report)

Mong Kok Stadium
Attendance: 251
Referee: Wong Chi Tang
8 March 2008
14:00

Eastern	0–0	Lanwa Redbull
	(Report)

Mong Kok Stadium
Attendance: 650
Referee: Liu Kwok Man
8 March 2008
16:00

Bulova Rangers	2–2	Wofoo Tai Po
Lam Ka Wai 81' 86'	(Report)	Junior 26' (pen.); Annan 79'

Mong Kok Stadium
Attendance: 650
Referee: Ng Kai Lam
25 March 2008
18:00

Citizen	0–1	Convoy Sun Hei
	(Report)	Chan Yiu Lun 66'

Mong Kok Stadium
Attendance: 183
Referee: Cheung Yim Yau
9 April 2008
20:00

Workable	1–4	South China
Au Yeung Yiu Chung 53'	(Report)	Wong Chin Hung 26'; Detinho 63'; Maxwell 77' 87'

Mong Kok Stadium
Attendance: 1,000
Referee: Hung Cheung Chi

=== Round 14 ===
15 March 2008
14:00

Eastern	0–0	Workable
	(Report)

Mong Kok Stadium
Attendance: 838
Referee: Ng Chiu Kok
15 March 2008
15:00

Lanwa Redbull	1–1	Wofoo Tai Po
Villalba 5'	(Report)	Lee Hong Lim 90'

Dongguan Stadium
Referee: Cheng Oi Cho
15 March 2008
16:00

Convoy Sun Hei	1–1	Bulova Rangers
Roger 59'	(Report)	Siumar 85' (pen.)

Mong Kok Stadium
Attendance: 838
Referee: Fung Ka Yu
29 March 2008
14:00

Kitchee	0–1	Citizen
	(Report)	Ronan 17'

Mong Kok Stadium
Attendance: 2,092
Referee: Lui Siu Chuen
29 March 2008
16:00

South China	0–2	Happy Valley
	(Report)	Chao Pengfei 25' 36'

Mong Kok Stadium
Attendance: 2,092
Referee: Ng Chiu Kok

=== Round 15 ===
4 April 2008
14:00

Workable	3–2	Lanwa Redbull
Au Yeung Yiu Chung 33'; Yang Xu 35'; Balbinot 62'	(Report)	Anibal 70' (pen.); Min Jin 74'

Mong Kok Stadium
Attendance: 671
Referee: Ng Kai Lam
4 April 2008
16:00

Wofoo Tai Po	2–2	Convoy Sun Hei
Joel 48'; Lee Wai Lim 72'	(Report)	Chan Yiu Lun 45'; Roger 82'

Mong Kok Stadium
Attendance: 671
Referee: Liu Kwok Man
5 April 2008
15:00

Citizen	2–1	South China
Ronan 65' (pen.); Márcio 78'	(Report)	Detinho 37' (pen.)

Mong Kok Stadium
Attendance: 2,184
Referee: Wong Chi Tang
6 April 2008
14:00

Bulova Rangers	3–1	Kitchee
Lam Ka Wai 29'; Nanmi 45' (o.g.); Minga 60'	(Report)	Cheng Lai Hin 22'

Mong Kok Stadium
Attendance: 894
Referee: Cheng Oi Cho
6 April 2008
16:00

Happy Valley	3–3	Eastern
Tomy 17'; Chao Pengfei 36'; Godfred 42'	(Report)	Fábio 22' 86'; Paulo 82'

Mong Kok Stadium
Attendance: 894
Referee: Fung Ka Yu

=== Round 16 ===
12 April 2008
14:00

Kitchee	2–1	Wofoo Tai Po
McKee 77' 90'	(Report)	Sze Kin Wai 84'

Mong Kok Stadium
Attendance: 1,607
Referee: Liu Kwok Man
12 April 2008
15:00

Lanwa Redbull	1–1	Convoy Sun Hei
Ge Shengxiang 16'	(Report)	Giovane 28'

Dongguan Stadium
Referee: Ng Kai Lam
12 April 2008
16:00

South China	0–0	Bulova Rangers
	(Report)

Mong Kok Stadium
Attendance: 1,607
Referee: Ng Chiu Kok
13 April 2008
14:00

Workable	0–1	Happy Valley
	(Report)	Denisson 3'

Mong Kok Stadium
Attendance: 999
Referee: Chan Shui Hung
13 April 2008
16:00

Eastern	4–2	Citizen
Rodrigo 4' 33' 75'; So Yiu Man 17'	(Report)	Paulinho 72'; Ronan 90' (pen.)

Mong Kok Stadium
Attendance: 999
Referee: Cheung Yim Yau

=== Round 17 ===
18 April 2008
20:00

Happy Valley	0–0	Lanwa Redbull
	(Report)

Mong Kok Stadium
Attendance: 117
Referee: Cheng Oi Cho
19 April 2008
14:00

Citizen	4–1	Workable
Baise 34'; Paulinho 40'; Ju Yingzhi 61'; Leko 78'	(Report)	Beto 62' (pen.)

Mong Kok Stadium
Attendance: 460
Referee: Pau Sai Yin
20 April 2008
14:00

Bulova Rangers	0–0	Eastern
	(Report)

Mong Kok Stadium
Attendance: 904
Referee: Liu Kwok Man
20 April 2008
16:00

Convoy Sun Hei	2–2	Kitchee
Giovane 23'; Cordeiro 38'	(Report)	Goran 35' (pen.); Nanmi 72'

Mong Kok Stadium
Attendance: 904
Referee: Wong Po On
22 April 2008
20:00

Wofoo Tai Po	2–1	South China
Chiu Chun Kit 6'; Joel 76'	(Report)	Lee Chi Ho 8'

Mong Kok Stadium
Attendance: 1,590
Referee: Wong Chi Tang

=== Round 18 ===
26 April 2008
14:00

Workable	1–0	Bulova Rangers
Beto 24'	(Report)

Mong Kok Stadium
Attendance: 1,093
Referee: Cheng Oi Cho
26 April 2008
15:00

Lanwa Redbull	2–4	Kitchee
Hao Shuang 24'; Anibal 77'	(Report)	Akosah 6' 47' 52'; Gao Wen 66'

Dongguan Stadium
Referee: Cheung Yim Yau
26 April 2008
16:00

Happy Valley	0–2	Citizen
	(Report)	Marcio 21'; Anthony 75'

Mong Kok Stadium
Attendance: 1,093
Referee: Pau Sai Yin
27 April 2008
14:00

Eastern	2–3	Wofoo Tai Po
Rodrigo 5'; Yu Ho Pong 51'	(Report)	Rafael 12' 35'; Junior 59'

Mong Kok Stadium
Attendance: 4,199
Referee: Ng Chiu Kok
27 April 2008
16:00

South China	4–1	Convoy Sun Hei
Chan Chi Hong 24'; Schutz 61' 66'; Detinho 86' (pen.)	(Report)	Chan Yiu Lun 46'

Mong Kok Stadium
Attendance: 4,199
Referee: Liu Kwok Man

== Scorers ==
19 goals

- Detinho (South China)

12 goals

- Giovane (Convoy Sun Hei)

11 goals

- Maxwell (South China)

10 goals

- Wang Xuanhong (Citizen)

8 goals

- Rodrigo (Eastern)
- Junior (Wofoo Tai Po)

7 goals

- Tomy (Happy Valley)
- Annan (Wofoo Tai Po)
- Rafeal (Wofoo Tai Po)

6 goals

- Leko (Citizen)
- Paulo (Eastern)
- Chan Siu Ki (Kitchee)
- Goran Stankovski (Kitchee)
- Joel (Wofoo Tai Po)

5 goals

- Aldo Villalba (Lanwa Redbull)
- Chao Pengfei (Happy Valley)
- Julius Akosah (Kitchee)
- Roberto Fronza (Workable)

4 goals

- Liang Zicheng (Bulova Rangers)
- Chan Yiu Lun (Convoy Sun Hei)
- Fábio (Eastern)
- Godfred (Bulova Rangers/Happy Valley)
- Anibal Pacheco Orzuza (Lanwa Redbull)
- Lin Zhong (Lanwa Redbull)
- Schutz (South China)
- Au Yeung Yiu Chung (Workable)

3 goals

- Lam Ka Wai (Bulova Rangers)
- Marcio (Citizen)
- Ronan (Citizen)
- Batoum Roger (Convoy Sun Hei)
- Diego (Happy Valley)
- Poon Yiu Cheuk (Happy Valley)
- Anderson da Silva (Kitchee)
- Jaimes McKee (Kitchee)
- Itaparica (South China)
- Kwok Kin Pong (South China)
- Li Haiqiang (South China)

Only scorers with 3 goals or above are listed here.
