= List of Hong Kong football transfers summer 2008 =

This is a list of Hong Kong football transfers for the 2008 summer transfer window. Only transfers involving First Division clubs in the 2008–09 season are listed.

== Transfers ==
=== Citizen ===
In: Note: Flags indicate national team as defined under FIFA eligibility rules; some limited exceptions apply. Players may hold more than one non-FIFA nationality.

No.	Pos.	Nation	Player
1	GK	JPN	Hisanori Takada (free agent)
6	MF	HKG	Yeung Chi Lun (from Hong Kong C)
9	FW	BRA	Sandro (free agent)
10	FW	BRA	Marlon (free agent)
11	FW	HKG	Yuan Yang (free agent)

Out: Note: Flags indicate national team as defined under FIFA eligibility rules; some limited exceptions apply. Players may hold more than one non-FIFA nationality.

No.	Pos.	Nation	Player
2	DF	EQG	Ronan (released)
6	MF	HKG	Chen Zhizhao (released)
9	FW	HKG	Guo Feng (loan return to Dalian Haichang)
10	FW	BRA	Leko (released)
17	GK	HKG	Ho Kwok Chuen (to TSW Pegasus)
18	MF	GHA	Anthony Nyatepe (to Mutual)
21	DF	HKG	Ho Ka Kin (to Yau Tsim Mong FT)

=== Convoy Sun Hei ===
In: Note: Flags indicate national team as defined under FIFA eligibility rules; some limited exceptions apply. Players may hold more than one non-FIFA nationality.

No.	Pos.	Nation	Player
6	FW	BRA	Anderson
20	MF	HKG	Kwok Yue Hung (from Shatin)
23	DF	HKG	Lai Ka Fai (from Bulova Rangers)
27	MF	CMR	Wilfred Bamnjo (from Kitchee)

Out: Note: Flags indicate national team as defined under FIFA eligibility rules; some limited exceptions apply. Players may hold more than one non-FIFA nationality.

No.	Pos.	Nation	Player
8	MF	BRA	Mauricio Pizzi
9	FW	CMR	Roger Batoum
23	DF	BRA	João Miguel
25	MF	HKG	Lam Wan Kit (to Kwai Tsing)
27	DF	IND	Manprit Singh (to Hong Kong Rangers FC)

=== Eastern ===
In: Note: Flags indicate national team as defined under FIFA eligibility rules; some limited exceptions apply. Players may hold more than one non-FIFA nationality.

No.	Pos.	Nation	Player
1	GK	HKG	Chung Ho Yin (from South China)
5	DF	HKG	Ngai Pok Keung (from Workable)
6	MF	HKG	Tam Lok Hin (from Workable)
7	MF	HKG	Wong Chun Yue (from Workable)
9	FW	CMR	Julius Akosah (from Kitchee)
10	MF	BRA	Siumar (from Bulova Rangers)
11	MF	HKG	Lee Kin Wo (from Workable)
12	MF	HKG	Pak Wing Chak (from Workable)
13	MF	HKG	Tsang Chi Hau (from Workable)
14	DF	HKG	So Wai Chuen (from Workable)
15	MF	HKG	Yan Chi Kan (from Hong Kong C)
16	DF	HKG	Chan Ka Lok (from Hong Kong C)
17	DF	HKG	Yapp Hung Fai (from Workable)
20	MF	HKG	Szeto Man Chun (from Kitchee)
22	MF	HKG	Lau Nim Yat (from Workable)
23	MF	HKG	Yang Xu (from Workable)
24	GK	HKG	Tung Ho Yin (from Workable)

Out: Note: Flags indicate national team as defined under FIFA eligibility rules; some limited exceptions apply. Players may hold more than one non-FIFA nationality.

No.	Pos.	Nation	Player

=== Fourway ===
In: Note: Flags indicate national team as defined under FIFA eligibility rules; some limited exceptions apply. Players may hold more than one non-FIFA nationality.

No.	Pos.	Nation	Player
1	GK	BRA	Luciano (free agent)
2	DF	HKG	Ma Siu Kwan (from Hong Kong C)
3	DF	CHN	Yu Yang (from Bulova Rangers)
4	DF	HKG	Yau Kam Leung (from Shatin)
5	DF	CGO	Michel De Buisson (free agent)
6	FW	HKG	Lau Ka Shing (from Bulova Rangers)
7	FW	HKG	Iu Wai (from Bulova Rangers)
8	MF	HKG	Tam Siu Wai (from Kitchee)
9	FW	BRA	Edson Bugrão (free agent)
10	FW	CGO	Edson Minga (from Bulova Rangers)
11	FW	NGA	Caleb Ekwenugo (from Bulova Rangers)
12	FW	HKG	Lam Hok Hei (from Hong Kong C)
13	MF	HKG	Tse Tin Yau (from Bulova Rangers)
14	MF	HKG	Chan Siu Yuen (from Bulova Rangers)
16	MF	HKG	Chak Ting Fung (from Bulova Rangers)
17	GK	CHN	Sui Weijie (from Bulova Rangers)
18	DF	HKG	Chan Cham Hei (from Hong Kong C)
19	GK	HKG	Leung Hing Kit (from Bulova Rangers)
20	FW	HKG	To Hon To (from Bulova Rangers)
21	DF	HKG	Yuen Tsun Tung (free agent)
22	MF	HKG	Lai Yiu Cheong (from Bulova Rangers)
23	MF	BRA	Paulo (from Eastern)
26	DF	HKG	Yuen Tsun Nam (from Bulova Rangers)
28	DF	CMR	Jean-Jacques Kilama (from Bulova Rangers)
30	DF	COD	Muana Lukalu (from Bulova Rangers)
—	DF	HKG	Fung Ka Ki (from Bulova Rangers)

Out: Note: Flags indicate national team as defined under FIFA eligibility rules; some limited exceptions apply. Players may hold more than one non-FIFA nationality.

No.	Pos.	Nation	Player
—	DF	HKG	Fung Ka Ki (loan to Mutual)

=== Happy Valley ===
In: Note: Flags indicate national team as defined under FIFA eligibility rules; some limited exceptions apply. Players may hold more than one non-FIFA nationality.

No.	Pos.	Nation	Player

Out: Note: Flags indicate national team as defined under FIFA eligibility rules; some limited exceptions apply. Players may hold more than one non-FIFA nationality.

No.	Pos.	Nation	Player

=== Kitchee ===
In: Note: Flags indicate national team as defined under FIFA eligibility rules; some limited exceptions apply. Players may hold more than one non-FIFA nationality.

No.	Pos.	Nation	Player

Out: Note: Flags indicate national team as defined under FIFA eligibility rules; some limited exceptions apply. Players may hold more than one non-FIFA nationality.

No.	Pos.	Nation	Player

=== Mutual ===
In: Note: Flags indicate national team as defined under FIFA eligibility rules; some limited exceptions apply. Players may hold more than one non-FIFA nationality.

No.	Pos.	Nation	Player

Out: Note: Flags indicate national team as defined under FIFA eligibility rules; some limited exceptions apply. Players may hold more than one non-FIFA nationality.

No.	Pos.	Nation	Player

=== NT Realty Wofoo Tai Po (Wofoo Tai Po) ===
In: Note: Flags indicate national team as defined under FIFA eligibility rules; some limited exceptions apply. Players may hold more than one non-FIFA nationality.

No.	Pos.	Nation	Player
18	MF	HKG	Fung Chung Ting

Out: Note: Flags indicate national team as defined under FIFA eligibility rules; some limited exceptions apply. Players may hold more than one non-FIFA nationality.

No.	Pos.	Nation	Player
2	DF	HKG	Fong Ching Hei
4	MF	HKG	Li Wing Kin
5	DF	HKG	Leung Kam Fai (to Shatin)
18	DF	HKG	So Hoi Ming

=== South China ===
In: Note: Flags indicate national team as defined under FIFA eligibility rules; some limited exceptions apply. Players may hold more than one non-FIFA nationality.

No.	Pos.	Nation	Player
1	GK	CHN	Li Weijun
3	DF	HKG	Poon Yiu Cheuk (from Happy Valley)
7	FW	HKG	Chan Siu Ki (from Kitchee)
9	FW	CHN	Liang Zicheng (loan return from Bulova Rangers)
10	MF	HKG	Au Yeung Yiu Chung (from Workable)
17	MF	HKG	Au Yeung Yiu Chung (loan from TSW Pegasus)
19	MF	BRA	Monteiro (from Happy Valley)
20	DF	HKG	Lo Chun Kit (from Eastern)
—	DF	HKG	Lin Junsheng (from Kitchee)

Out: Note: Flags indicate national team as defined under FIFA eligibility rules; some limited exceptions apply. Players may hold more than one non-FIFA nationality.

No.	Pos.	Nation	Player
1	GK	HKG	Chung Ho Yin (to Eastern)
—	DF	HKG	Chan Ka Chun (loan to TSW Pegasus)
—	DF	HKG	Deng Jinghuang (loan to TSW Pegasus)
—	DF	HKG	Lai Man Fei (loan to TSW Pegasus)
—	DF	HKG	Lin Junsheng (loan to TSW Pegasus)
—	MF	HKG	Cheng King Ho (loan to TSW Pegasus)
—	MF	BRA	Itaparica (loan to TSW Pegasus)
—	MF	HKG	Yeung Ching Kwong (loan to TSW Pegasus)
—	MF	HKG	Yip Chi Ho (loan to TSW Pegasus)
—	FW	HKG	Cheng Siu Wai (loan to TSW Pegasus)

=== TSW Pegasus ===
In: Note: Flags indicate national team as defined under FIFA eligibility rules; some limited exceptions apply. Players may hold more than one non-FIFA nationality.

No.	Pos.	Nation	Player

Out: Note: Flags indicate national team as defined under FIFA eligibility rules; some limited exceptions apply. Players may hold more than one non-FIFA nationality.

No.	Pos.	Nation	Player

=== Tuen Mun Progoal (Workable) ===
In: Note: Flags indicate national team as defined under FIFA eligibility rules; some limited exceptions apply. Players may hold more than one non-FIFA nationality.

No.	Pos.	Nation	Player

Out: Note: Flags indicate national team as defined under FIFA eligibility rules; some limited exceptions apply. Players may hold more than one non-FIFA nationality.

No.	Pos.	Nation	Player
