= 2007–08 Hong Kong FA Cup =

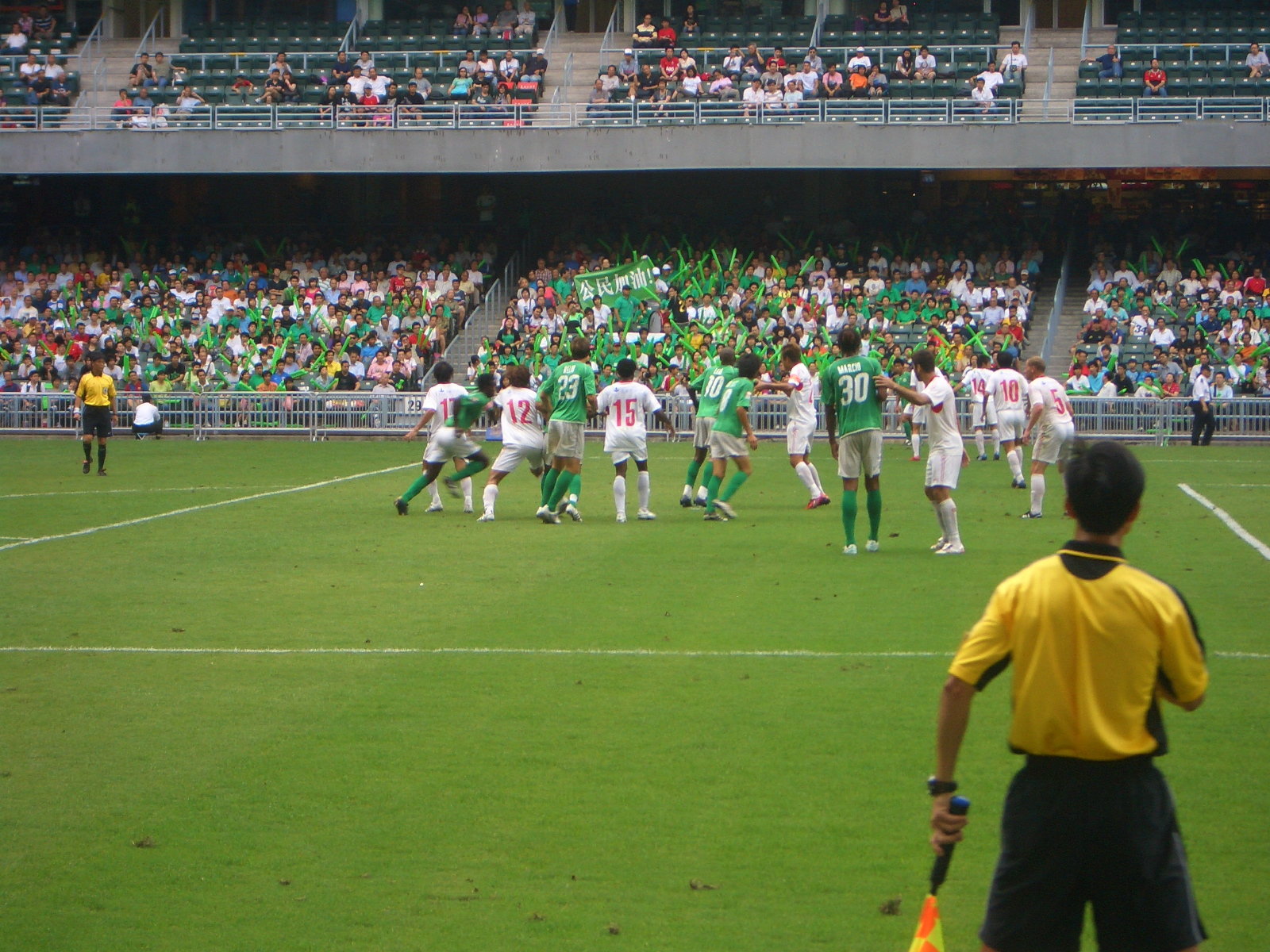

Tournament details
- Country: Hong Kong

Final positions
- Champions: Citizen (1st title)
- Runners-up: Wofoo Tai Po

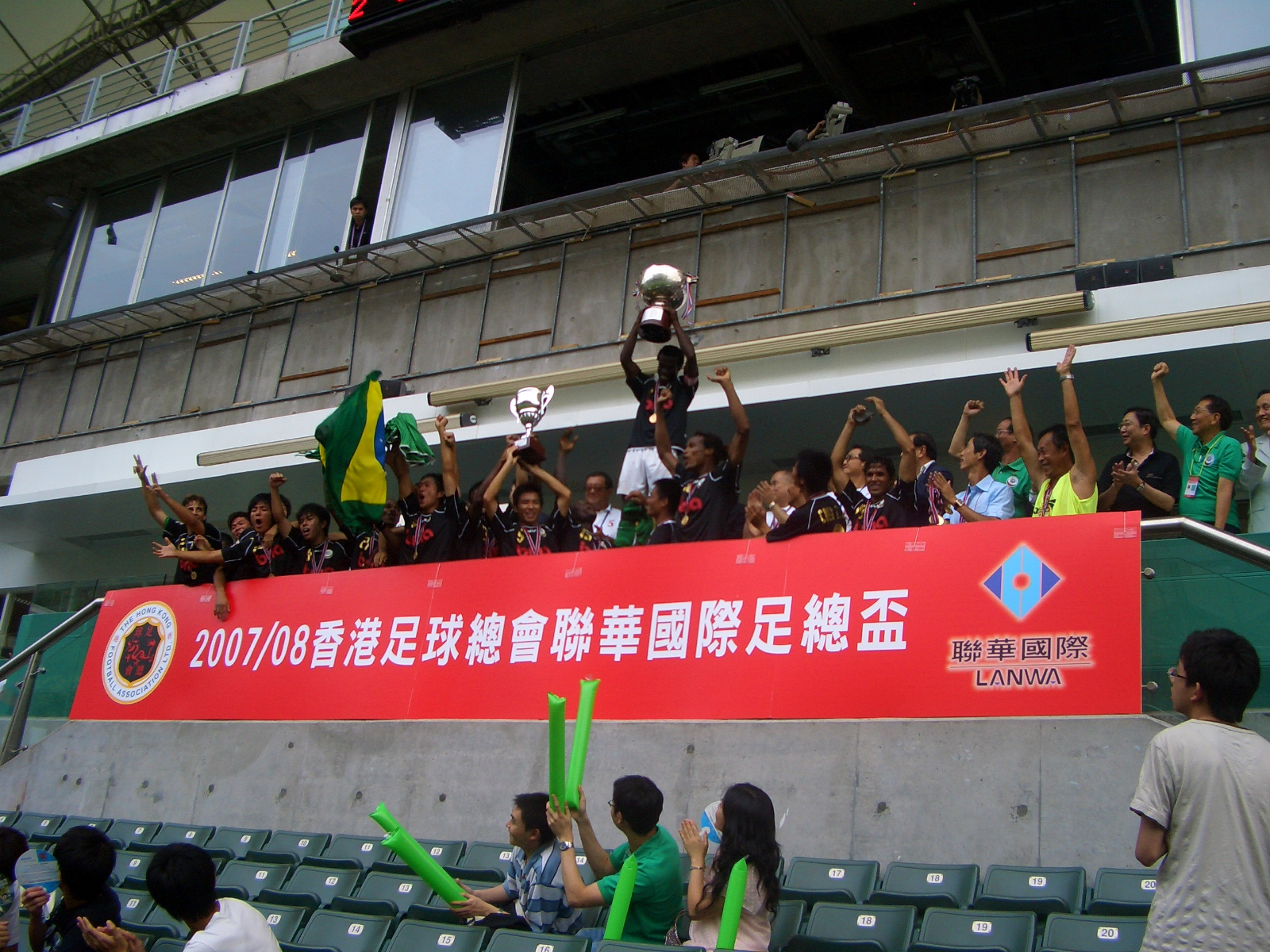
2007-08 Hong Kong FA Cup Win

The 2007–08 Hong Kong FA Cup was the 34th staging of the Hong Kong FA Cup. Citizen beat Wofoo Tai Po by 2–0 in the final and captured the FA Cup for the first time.

The competition started on 23 April 2008 with 10 Hong Kong First Division clubs. Four of them took part in the first round to determine which team advanced to the quarter-finals. From quarter finals onward, the cup competition was a single-elimination tournament.

The competition was officially known as 2007/2008 HKFA Lanwa International FA Cup due to sponsorship from LANWA Group Company Limited

Although all the matches before the final was held at the Mongkok Stadium, the final was staged at the Hong Kong Stadium on 18 May 2008. The final match was part of the fund raising charity activities for the 2008 Sichuan earthquake. All profits of the game was donated for the rescue and rebuild of Sichuan after the basic costs are deducted. Four matches was played in total, including three friendly matches and the FA Cup final. The friendly matches include 1) SCAA Veteran vs Happy Valley Veteran, 2) HKFA Invitation Team vs All Star Sport Association and 3) TVB Artist vs Ladies Star Team.

== Teams ==
- Bulova Rangers
- Citizen
- Convoy Sun Hei
- Eastern
- Happy Valley
- Kitchee
- Lanwa Redbull
- South China
- Wofoo Tai Po
- Workable

== Fixtures and results ==
All times are Hong Kong Time (UTC+8).

=== Bracket ===
First round
Convoy Sun Hei	2
Lanwa Redbull	0
Eastern	1
Workable	0

Quarter-finals
South China	1
Convoy Sun Hei	0
Bulova Rangers	0
Wofoo Tai Po	2
Citizen (pen.)	1 (7)
Kitchee	1 (6)
Happy Valley	1
Eastern (a.e.t.)	2

Semi-finals
South China	1
Wofoo Tai Po	2
Citizen	1
Eastern	0

Final
Wofoo Tai Po	0
Citizen	2

=== First round ===
2008-05-01
14:00

Eastern	1 – 0	Workable
Jeferson 56'	(Report)

Mong Kok Stadium
Attendance: 657
Referee: Wong Chi Tang

2008-05-01
16:00

Convoy Sun Hei	2 – 0	Lanwa Redbull
Giovane 1' 81'	(Report)

Mong Kok Stadium
Attendance: 657
Referee: Cheung Yim Yau

=== Quarter-finals ===
2008-05-03
14:00

Bulova Rangers	0 – 2	Wofoo Tai Po
	(Report)	Joel 54'; Lee Wai Lim 57'

Mong Kok Stadium
Attendance: 901
Referee: Fung Ka Yu

2008-05-03
16:00

Citizen	1 – 1 (a.e.t.)	Kitchee
Márcio 52'	(Report)	Akosah 33'
Penalties
Ronan (penalty scored); Ju Yingzhi (penalty scored); Chen Zhizhao (penalty scored); Sham Kwok Fai (penalty scored); Festus (penalty scored); Moses (penalty scored); Ho Kwok Chuen (penalty scored)	7 – 6	(penalty scored) Goran; (penalty scored) Cheung Kin Fung; (penalty scored) Gao Wen; (penalty scored) Jević; (penalty scored) Bamnjo; (penalty scored) Cheng Lai Hin; (penalty missed) Li Hang Wui

Mong Kok Stadium
Attendance: 901
Referee: Cheng Oi Cho

2008-05-04
14:00

Happy Valley	1 – 2 (a.e.t.)	Eastern
Tomy 45' (pen.)	(Report)	Paulo 34'; Rodrigo 114'

Mong Kok Stadium
Attendance: 2,734
Referee: Pau Sai Yin

2008-05-04
16:00

South China	1 – 0	Convoy Sun Hei
Itaparica 41'	(Report)

Mong Kok Stadium
Attendance: 2,734
Referee: Ng Chiu Kok

=== Semi-finals ===
2008-05-10
14:00

Eastern	0 – 1	Citizen
	(Report)	Chen Zhizhao 49'

Mong Kok Stadium
Attendance: 2,682
Referee: Liu Kwok Man

2008-05-10
16:00

South China	1 – 2	Wofoo Tai Po
Chan Wai Ho 32'	(Report)	Ye Jia 47'; Rafael 85'

Mong Kok Stadium
Attendance: 2,682
Referee: Cheung Yim Yau

=== Final ===
2008-05-18
15:00

Citizen	2 – 0	Wofoo Tai Po
Chen Zhizhao 14'; Joel 84' (o.g.)	(Report)

Hong Kong Stadium
Attendance: 5,925
Referee: Wong Po On

== Top goalscorers ==
2 goals

- (Brazil) Giovane (Convoy Sun Hei)
- (China) Chen Zhizhao (Citizen)

1 goal

- (Cameroon) Akosah (Kitchee)
- (Brazil) Rodrigo (Eastern)
- (Hong Kong) Chan Wai Ho (South China)
- (Brazil) Rafael (Wofoo Tai Po)
- (Brazil) Itaparica (South China)
- (Brazil) Márcio (Citizen)
- (Brazil) Tomy (Happy Valley)
- (Hong Kong) Lee Wai Lim (Wofoo Tai Po)
- (Brazil) Jeferson (Eastern)
- (Brazil) Paulo (Eastern)
- (Brazil) Joel (Wofoo Tai Po)
- (China) Ye Jia (Wofoo Tai Po)

== Prizes ==
=== Team awards ===
- Champion (HK$80,000): Citizen
- 1st Runners-up (HK$20,000): Wofoo Tai Po
- Knock-out in the semi-finals (2 teams) (HK$10,000 each): Eastern, South China
- Knock-out in the Preliminary (6 teams) (HK$5,000 each): Bulova Rangers, Convoy Sun Hei, Happy Valley, Kitchee, Lanwa Redbull, Workable

=== Individual awards ===
- Top Scorer Award (HK$5,000 shared): (Brazil) Giovane (Convoy Sun Hei), (China) Chen Zhizhao (Citizen)
- Best Defender Award (HK$5,000): (Nigeria) Festus Baise (Citizen)

== Trivia ==
- It was the first time since 1991–92 season that the FA Cup final was competed by two teams which had never reached this cup final before.
- Both Citizen and Wofoo Tai Po had never captured any senior trophies in their club histories.

== See also ==
- The Hong Kong Football Association
