= Chen Zhizhao =

Chinese footballer (born 1988)

Chen Zhizhao 陈志钊
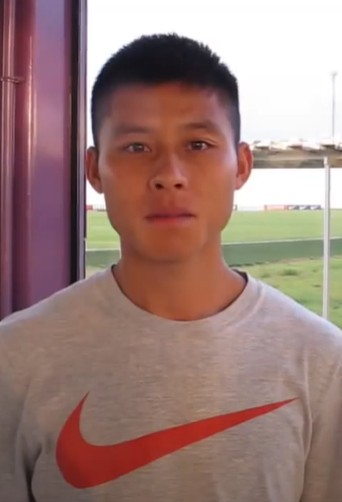
- Zhizhao in 2013

Personal information
- Full name: Chen Zhizhao
- Date of birth: 14 March 1988 (age 38)
- Place of birth: Panyu, Guangdong, China
- Height: 1.70 m (5 ft 7 in)
- Position: Attacking midfielder

Youth career
- 2000–2003: Guangzhou Yida Football School
- 2003–2006: Shanghai Shenhua

Senior career*
Years	Team	Apps	(Gls)
2007–2009	Citizen	23	(2)
2009–2013	Shanghai Shenxin	48	(13)
2012–2013	→ Corinthians (loan)	2	(0)
2014–2015	Beijing Guoan	35	(5)
2016–2022	Guangzhou R&F	123	(9)
- * Club domestic league appearances and goals as of 20 June 2023

Chen Zhizhao
- Traditional Chinese: 陳志釗
- Simplified Chinese: 陈志钊
Transcriptions
Standard Mandarin
- Hanyu Pinyin: Chén Zhìzhāo
- IPA: [ʈʂʰə̌n ʈʂɻ̩̂ ʈʂáʊ]
Yue: Cantonese
- Jyutping: Can4 Zi3-ciu1
- IPA: [tsʰɐn˩ tsi˧ tsʰiw˥]

Chen Zhizhao Chinese: 陈志钊; pinyin: Chén Zhìzhāo; born 14 March 1988), known as Zizao in Brazil, is a Chinese former professional footballer who played as an attacking midfielder.

In his career he represented Citizen before joining second tier club Nanchang Hengyuan where he gained promotion with them and then became the team's top goalscorer in the following season as he helped them remain within the top tier. He would go on to have a brief spell with Brazilian team Corinthians before returning to China with Beijing Guoan. He would spend seven seasons at Guangzhou R&F in the Chinese Super League before ending his career.

== Club career ==
Chen Zhizhao started his football career playing for Shanghai Shenhua's youth academy; however, he was unable to break into their first team. He then transferred to Hong Kong First Division League side Citizen AA at the beginning of the 2007-08 league season where he would make his debut for the club against Lanwa Redbull in the first game of the season in a 0-0 draw. He quickly established himself within the team and would play in 13 league games and see Citizen come second within the league. Throughout the season he would also play in all of Citizen's cup games and would score his first goal against Eastern AA on 24 November 2007 in a Hong Kong Senior Shield game that Citizen lose 3-1. His following goals would come in the Hong Kong FA Cup where he scored against Eastern AA on 10 May 2008 in a semifinal game that saw them win 1-0. This was then followed by a goal in the final of the FA Cup win against Wofoo Tai Po on 18 May 2008 that saw Citizen win 2-0.

Chen moved back to mainland China and signed a five-year contract with Nanchang Hengyuan (now known as Shanghai Shenxin) on 26 February 2009. He scored three goals as Nanchang finished second in the China League One and won promotion to the Chinese Super League for the first time. He scored ten goals and assisted eight times in thirty appearances which secured Nanchang's stay in the top flight for the next season.

Chen was linked with Liga de Honra side C.D. Trofense in January 2011. Trofense was interested with Chen, but Nanchang blocked this transfer. According to Chen's contract with the club on 26 February 2009, if a non-Chinese football club provided a bid of around €200,000 for him before 26 February 2011, then Nanchang would accept the transfer without any condition. However, Nanchang insisted that €200,000 was provided by Chen's agency instead of the Portuguese club; besides, in the new contract which signed in early 2010, there were no related contract terms, so they had enough reasons to block this transfer. Chen refused to return to the club after this incident. He didn't make any appearances for the club in the 2011 season and instead played for Panyu Pearl, a futsal team in his hometown.

In February 2012, Chen was loaned to Campeonato Brasileiro Série A side Corinthians until 31 December 2013. He made his debut for Corinthians in a 2–0 defeat against Cruzeiro on 17 October 2012, coming on for Welder at the 80th minute. Chen made his first start for the club on 20 January 2013, assisting the first goal in a 1-1 draw against Paulista. On 11 March 2013, Chen was called up to the Chinese national team by then manager José Antonio Camacho to be a part of the squad that would face Iraq during 2015 AFC Asian Cup qualification. He returned to his parent club Shanghai Shenxin after the 2013 season.

On 28 February 2014, Chen transferred to fellow Chinese Super League side Beijing Guoan. He received a ban of four matches at the beginning of 2014 season by Chinese Football Association for age falsification which he changed his age from 14 March 1988 to 14 March 1989. He made his debut for the club on 24 March 2014 in a 2–0 win against Shanghai Greenland. He scored his first goal for the club on 27 April 2014 in a 1–0 win against Harbin Yiteng.

On 22 December 2015, Chen transferred to his hometown club Guangzhou R&F in the Chinese Super League. On 4 March 2016, he made his debut in a 2–1 home defeat against Hebei China Fortune. He scored his first goal for the club on 21 August 2016 by shooting the winner in the 87th minute against Chongqing Lifan, which gave Guangzhou R&F a 5–4 away win. On 18 June 2017, Chen was involved in a collision during a league match with Shanghai SIPG. Although just being cautioned, he received a ban of 7 matches by the Chinese Football Association. In September 2020 Chen made his 100th appearance for Guangzhou R&F. On 2 February 2023 he would retire from professional football.

== Career statistics ==
As of 31 December 2022.

Appearances and goals by club, season and competition
Club	Season	League			National Cup		League Cup		Continental		Other		Total	
Club	Season	Division	Apps	Goals	Apps	Goals	Apps	Goals	Apps	Goals	Apps	Goals	Apps	Goals
Citizen AA	2007-08	HK First Division League	13	0	3	2	1	0	-		1 (Note: Appearances in Hong Kong Senior Challenge Shield)	1	18	3
Citizen AA	2008-09	HK First Division League	10	2	0	0	0	0	-		2	0	12	2
Citizen AA	Total		23	2	3	2	1	0	0	0	3	1	30	5
Shanghai Shenxin	2009	China League One	18	3	-		-		-		-		18	3
Shanghai Shenxin	2010	Chinese Super League	30	10	-		-		-		-		30	10
Shanghai Shenxin	2011	Chinese Super League	0	0	0	0	-		-		-		0	0
Shanghai Shenxin	Total		48	13	0	0	0	0	0	0	0	0	48	13
Corinthians	2012	Série A	1	0	0	0	-		0	0	0 (Note: Appearances in Campeonato Paulista)	0	1	0
Corinthians	2013	Série A	1	0	0	0	-		0	0	3	0	4	0
Corinthians	Total		2	0	0	0	0	0	0	0	3	0	5	0
Beijing Guoan	2014	Chinese Super League	21	4	3	0	-		0	0	-		24	4
Beijing Guoan	2015	Chinese Super League	14	1	2	0	-		4	0	-		20	1
Beijing Guoan	Total		35	5	5	0	0	0	4	0	0	0	44	5
Guangzhou R&F	2016	Chinese Super League	17	1	4	0	-		-		-		21	1
Guangzhou R&F	2017	Chinese Super League	22	1	3	0	-		-		-		25	1
Guangzhou R&F	2018	Chinese Super League	25	3	6	0	-		-		-		31	3
Guangzhou R&F	2019	Chinese Super League	14	0	1	0	-		-		-		15	0
Guangzhou R&F	2020	Chinese Super League	14	2	2	0	-		-		-		16	2
Guangzhou R&F	2021	Chinese Super League	16	1	1	0	-		-		-		17	1
Guangzhou R&F	2022	Chinese Super League	15	1	2	0	-		-		-		17	1
Guangzhou R&F	Total		123	9	19	0	0	0	0	0	0	0	142	9
Career total			231	29	27	2	1	0	4	0	6	1	269	32

== Honours ==
Citizen AA

- Hong Kong FA Cup: 2007–08

Corinthians

- Campeonato Paulista: 2013

Individual

- Hong Kong FA Cup Top goalscorer: 2007–08

Awards
Preceded by Tales Schütz	Hong Kong FA Cup; Top Scorer (with Giovane); 2007–08	Succeeded by Chan Siu Ki
