= Sumaré Atlético Clube =

Sumaré
- Full name: Sumaré Atlético Clube
- Nickname(s): SAC; Aluzão
- Founded: December 9, 2005
- Ground: Estádio Municipal Municipal José Pereira, Sumaré, São Paulo state, Brazil
- Capacity: 5,000
Home colours	Away colours

Sumaré Atlético Clube, commonly known as Sumaré, is a Brazilian football club based in Sumaré, São Paulo state.

== History ==
The club was founded on December 9, 2005, by the businessman Gilberto Pitareli, adopting similar colors and kits as Colombia's national team, and professionalized its football department in 2006, competing for the first time in a professional competition in the 2006 Campeonato Paulista Segunda Divisão.

== Stadium ==
Sumaré Atlético Clube play their home games at Estádio Municipal José Pereira. The stadium has a maximum capacity of 5,000 people.

== See also ==
- Ponte Preta Sumaré Futebol Clube
