= Ponte Preta Sumaré Futebol Clube =

Ponte Preta Sumaré
- Full name: Ponte Preta Sumaré Futebol Clube
- Nickname(s): Macaquinha
- Founded: April 19, 2001; 23 years ago
- Dissolved: 2002
- Ground: Estádio Municipal Municipal José Pereira, Sumaré, São Paulo state, Brazil
- Capacity: 6,000
Home colors	Away colors

Ponte Preta Sumaré Futebol Clube, commonly known as Ponte Preta Sumaré, was a Brazilian football club based in Sumaré, São Paulo state.

== History ==
The club was founded on April 19, 2001, as Associação Atlética Ponte Preta reserve team, after a partnership between the club and Sumaré City Hall. They finished in the second position in the 2001 Campeonato Paulista Série B3, when they lost the competition to Corinthians B. The club folded in 2002, after the partnership with Associação Atlética Ponte Preta ended.

== Stadium ==
Ponte Preta Sumaré Futebol Clube played their home games at Estádio Municipal José Pereira. The stadium has a maximum capacity of 5,000 people.

== See also ==
- Associação Atlética Ponte Preta
- Sumaré Atlético Clube
