= Detinho =

Brazilian-born Hong Kong footballer (born 1973)

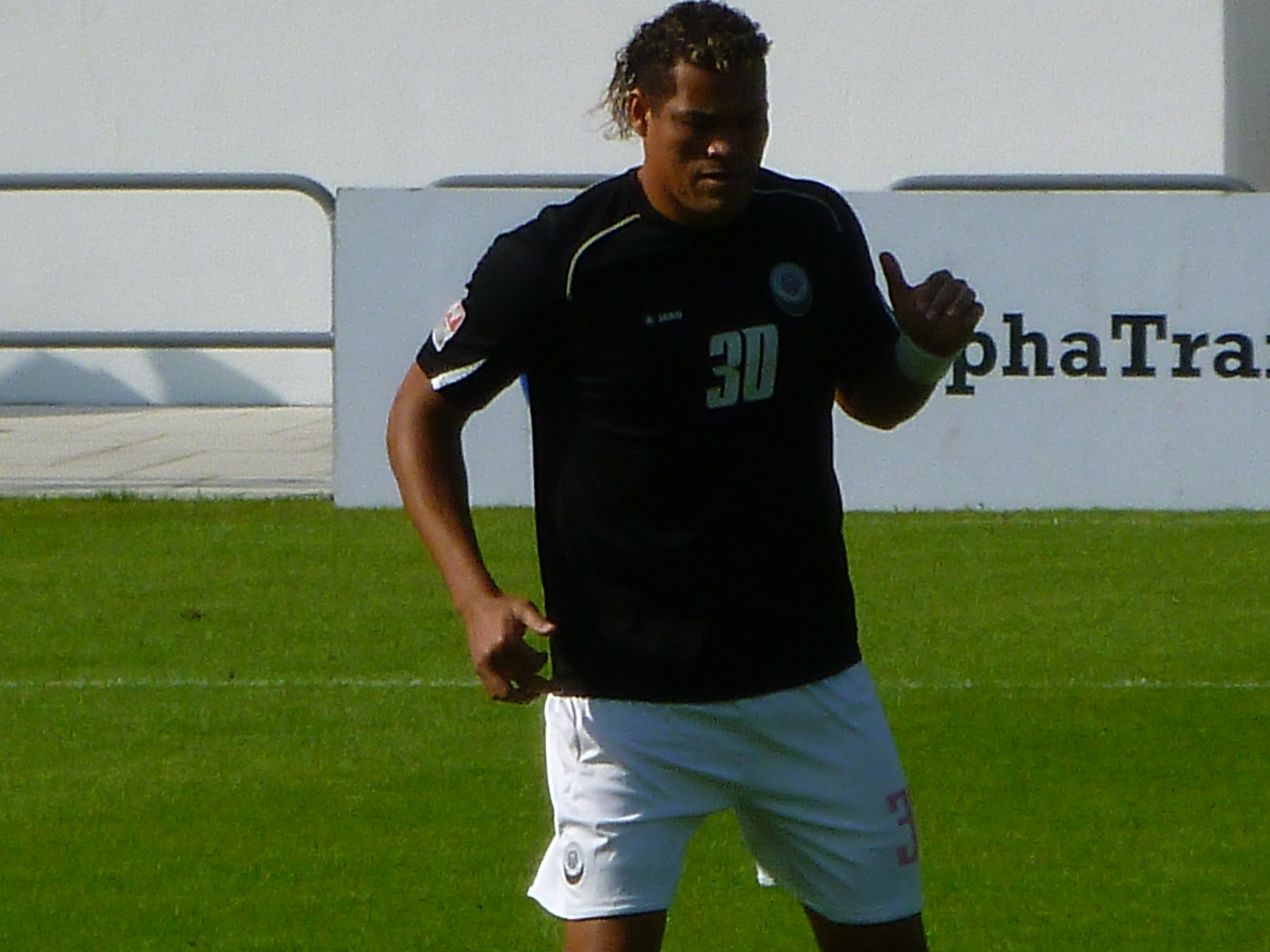
- Detinho before a game with Citizen in 2012

Personal information
- Full name: José Wellington Bento dos Santos
- Date of birth: 11 September 1973 (age 53)
- Place of birth: Sergipe, Brazil
- Height: 1.88 m (6 ft 2 in)
- Position: Striker

Senior career*
Years	Team	Apps	(Gls)
1997	Vasco–SE		
1997	Vasco Gama		
1997–1998	Paços Ferreira	10	(2)
1998	Vianense	15	(10)
1998–1999	Oliveirense	31	(12)
1999–2000	Marco	26	(19)
2000–2001	Campomaiorense	30	(8)
2001–2005	Leixões	105	(27)
2005–2006	Imortal	29	(12)
2006–2009	South China	56	(52)
2009–2014	Citizen	82	(25)
2014–2015	South China	8	(1)
2015–2020	Wing Yee	93	(82)
- * Club domestic league appearances and goals as of 24 October 2019

José Wellington Bento dos Santos (Chinese: 迪天奴; born 11 September 1973), known as Detinho, is a Brazilian former professional footballer who played as a striker.

He spent his entire professional career in Portugal and Hong Kong, retiring in his 40s.

== Club career ==
=== Portugal ===
Born in Sergipe, Detinho only started playing organised football well in his 20s. In 1997, he moved to Portugal where he remained the following nine years, starting with F.C. Paços de Ferreira in the second division and moving to SC Vianense of the third level after a few months.

Subsequently, Detinho represented U.D. Oliveirense and F.C. Marco in division three, his performances with the latter attracting the attention of Primeira Liga club S.C. Campomaiorense who purchased him for the 2000–01 season, and he responded by scoring eight goals in 29 games to finish team top-scorer, even though it was not good enough to prevent relegation.

Detinho signed with third-tier Leixões S.C. in late September 2001. He netted ten times in the league his first year, adding three in the club's historic run in the Taça de Portugal which ended in the 1–0 final loss against Sporting CP where he played the full 90 minutes. He repeated individual numbers the following campaign, helping to achieve promotion.

After the previous domestic cup exploits, Detinho appeared with the Matosinhos side in the 2002–03 UEFA Cup, scoring in a 2–1 home win over PAOK FC in the first round (3–5 aggregate loss).

=== South China ===
Detinho joined South China AA in 2006 from Imortal DC, after the team gave up its "all-Chinese" policy. He had a very successful first season in the Hong Kong First Division League, being chosen South China Star of the Month three times (September, April and May), finishing second in the top scorers table and being selected in the Hong Kong Top Footballer Best XI; additionally, he was also voted his team's best player.

== Career statistics ==
=== Club (Hong Kong only) ===
As of 24 October 2019

Club	Season	League		Senior Shield		League Cup		FA Cup		AFC Cup		Total	
Club	Season	Apps	Goals	Apps	Goals	Apps	Goals	Apps	Goals	Apps	Goals	Apps	Goals
South China	2006–07	18	15	3	1	4	2	4	3	N/A	N/A	29	21
South China	2007–08	16	19	2	3	4	4	2	0	5	0	29	26
South China	2008–09	22	18	2	0	1	0	3	3	N/A	N/A	28	21
All		56	52	7	4	9	6	9	6	5	0	86	68
Citizen	2009–10	16	6	2	1	N/A	N/A	4	2	N/A	N/A	22	9
Citizen	2010–11	15	5	3	0	1	0	1	0	N/A	N/A	20	5
Citizen	2011–12	16	2	2	1	2	0	1	0	N/A	N/A	21	3
Citizen	2012–13	16	6	6	2	N/A	N/A	0	0	N/A	N/A	22	8
Citizen	2013–14	15	4	1	0	N/A	N/A	2	2	N/A	N/A	18	6
Citizen	2014–15	4	2	N/A	N/A	0	0	0	0	N/A	N/A	4	2
All		82	25	14	4	3	0	8	4	0	0	107	33
South China	2014–15	8	1	1	0	3	0	1	0	0	0	13	1
All		8	1	1	0	3	0	1	0	0	0	13	1
Wing Yee	2015–16	24	28	N/A	N/A	N/A	N/A	4	1	N/A	N/A	28	29
Wing Yee	2016–17	21	22	N/A	N/A	N/A	N/A	3	0	N/A	N/A	24	22
Wing Yee	2017–18	25	21	N/A	N/A	N/A	N/A	3	2	N/A	N/A	28	23
Wing Yee	2018–19	19	11	N/A	N/A	N/A	N/A	4	5	N/A	N/A	23	16
Wing Yee	2019–20	4	0	N/A	N/A	N/A	N/A	N/A	N/A	N/A	N/A	4	0
All		93	82	0	0	0	0	14	8	0	0	103	90
Total		239	160	22	8	15	6	32	18	5	0	313	192

== Honours ==
Marco

- Portuguese Second Division: 1999–2000

Leixões

- Portuguese Second Division: 2002–03
- Taça de Portugal runner-up: 2001–02

South China

- Hong Kong First Division League: 2006–07, 2007–08, 2008–09
- Hong Kong Senior Challenge Shield: 2006–07
- Hong Kong FA Cup: 2006–07
- Hong Kong League Cup: 2007–08

Citizen

- Hong Kong Senior Challenge Shield: 2010–11

Awards and achievements
Preceded by Tales Schutz	Hong Kong First Division League top scorer 2007–08; 2008–09 (with Giovane)	Succeeded by Cahê
