= Ronan Falcão =

Brazilian footballer (born 1985)

Personal information
- Full name: Ronan Carolino Falcão
- Date of birth: 7 May 1985 (age 41)
- Place of birth: Magé, Rio de Janeiro, Brazil
- Height: 1.91 m (6 ft 3 in)
- Positions: Centre-back; left-back

Youth career
- São Cristóvão
- Olaria
- 2002–2003: São José-RJ

Senior career*
Years	Team	Apps	(Gls)
2004	São José-RJ		
2004–2005	Cruzeiro		
2006–2008	Friburguense		
2007–2008	→ Citizen (loan)		
2008–2009	CFZ do Rio		
2008	→ Atlético Tubarão (loan)		
2009	Lok Stendal		
2009	Citizen		
2010–2011	América-RJ		
2011	Mes Rafsanjan		
2012	Americano		
2012	Botafogo-DF		
2013	Céres		
2013–2014	Serrano-BA		

International career^{‡}
2006–2012	Equatorial Guinea	16	(1)
- * Club domestic league appearances and goals as of 6 June 2008 ‡ National team caps and goals as of 16 June 2008

Ronan Carolino Falcão (born 7 May 1985), sometimes known mononymously as Ronan, is a former footballer who played as a centre-back or left-back. Born in Brazil, he played for the Equatorial Guinea national team.

== Club career ==
=== Early career ===
Ronan was born in Magé (Brazilian state of Rio de Janeiro) and began his career in Cruzeiro. When he was 19 years, he made a decision that everyone found very strange - to retire, he explained that he got tired of being separated from his family for a long time. After a year, he came back to play for Friburguense Atlético Clube.

=== Citizen AA (2007–2008) ===
In August 2007, Hong Kong club Citizen AA signed Ronan on loan from Friburguense until the end of the season. He was given the number 2 shirt and became the first Equatoguinean player to play in Hong Kong First Division League. On 16 September 2007, Ronan made his official debut for Citizen in a 4–0 win over Rangers in a First Division match at Mong Kok Stadium.

While Ronan play as a left back for his national team, he has been mainly used as a centre back at Citizen. He has also played in the left midfield position due to injuries in his team's attacking line. On 29 March 2008, Ronan scored his first goal for Citizen with a header, helping the team to a 1–0 victory over Kitchee SC in the First Division. He subsequently scored another goal from a penalty kick on 5 April 2008 to help Citizen to come back to win 2–1 against South China AA. He then scored from another penalty kick in a 2–4 defeat to Eastern AA on 13 April 2008, taking his tally for the season to 3.

Ronan missed the FA Cup 2007–08 final after being sent off in the semi-final against Eastern AA on 5 May 2008 for receiving two yellow cards. In the final, Citizen went on to win the cup with a 2–0 win over Wofoo Tai Po.

=== Germany ===
On 1 July 2009, Ronan signed with German Verbandsliga Sachsen-Anhalt club Lok Stendal.

== International career ==
Ronan made his Equatorial Guinea national team debut on 26 February 2006 in a friendly match against Benin in Cotonou. That day the National Nzalang (the nickname of Equatorial Guinea national football team) won by 1–0. On 1 June 2008, he scored the first goal in a 2–0 victory over Sierra Leone.

Ronan also played some friendly matches of category B between 2005 (vs. the team of Pará de Minas) and 2007 (vs. the Region of Murcia and Extremadura) and two in 2011 (vs. the French sides RSC Monteuil and FC Issy-les-Moulineaux).

=== International goals ===
#	Date	Venue	Opponent	Score	Result	Competition
1	1 June 2008	Estadio de Malabo, Malabo, Equatorial Guinea	Sierra Leone	1 – 0	2 - 0	World Cup 2010 Qualifying

== Honours ==
=== Club ===
Citizen AA

- Hong Kong FA Cup: 2007–08

=== International ===
Equatorial Guinea

- CEMAC Cup: 2006

== Career statistics ==
=== Club career ===
As of 6 June 2008

Club	Season	No.	League		Senior Shield		League Cup		FA Cup		AFC Cup		Total	
Club	Season	No.	Apps	Goals	Apps	Goals	Apps	Goals	Apps	Goals	Apps	Goals	Apps	Goals
Citizen AA (loan)	2007–08	2	10	3	1	0	2	0	2	0	—	—	15	3
Citizen AA (loan)	Total		10	3	1	0	2	0	2	0	—	—	15	3
Citizen AA	2009–10	4	7	0	2	0	0	0	0	0	—	—	9	0
Citizen AA	Total		7	0	2	0	0	0	0	0	—	—	9	0
Career Total														

== Current contract ==
- 28 March 2012 to 28 June 2012
