= Anderson da Silva (footballer, born 1980) =

Brazilian footballer

Personal information
- Full name: Anderson da Silva
- Date of birth: February 2, 1980 (age 46)
- Place of birth: Brazil
- Height: 1.85 m (6 ft 1 in)
- Position: Midfielder

Senior career*
Years	Team	Apps	(Gls)
2007–2008	Kitchee	18	(7)
2008–2009	Club Almagro	5	(1)
2009–2010	Atlante	13	(1)
2011–2012	Persiram Raja Ampat	13	(3)
2014–2015	Nacional Potosí	35	(10)
- * Club domestic league appearances and goals as of 11:40, 18 May 2015 (UTC)

Anderson da Silva (born on February 2, 1980) is a Brazilian former footballer who plays as a midfielder.
