= Joel (footballer, born 1980) =

Brazilian footballer

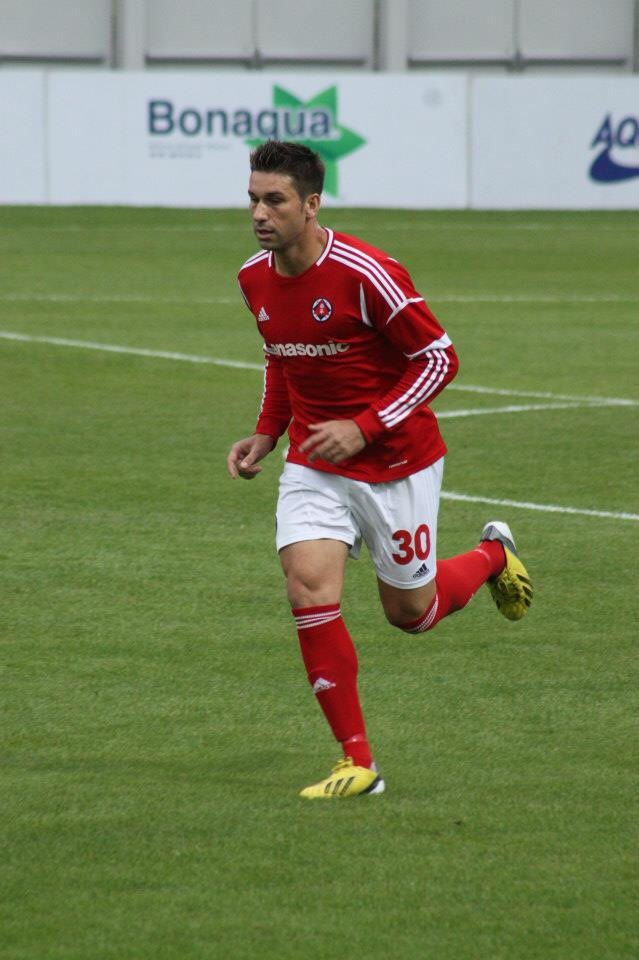
- Joel with South China in 2014

Personal information
- Full name: Joel Bertoti Padilha
- Date of birth: 24 July 1980 (age 46)
- Place of birth: Torres, Rio Grande do Sul, Brazil
- Height: 1.86 m (6 ft 1 in)
- Position: Centre-back

Senior career*
Years	Team	Apps	(Gls)
1995-2000	Caxias	16	(4)
2000-2003	São José-RS	48	(6)
2003-2005	Brasil de Pelotas	54	(8)
2005–2006	Esportivo	16	(1)
2006–2006	Caxias	10	(1)
2006–2009	Tai Po	45	(17)
2009–2010	Guangdong Sunray Cave	46	(2)
2011–2013	South China	30	(9)
2014	Hong Kong Rangers	6	(0)
- * Club domestic league appearances and goals

Joel Bertoti Padilha (Chinese: 祖爾 Joel; born 24 July 1980), commonly known as Joel, is a Brazilian former professional footballer who played as a centre-back.

== Career ==
=== Tai Po ===
Joel joined Tai Po in September 2006. He established himself as an important first team player immediately and scored a debut goal in Tai Po's first home game, against South China. He became an immediate solution of the team's weakness in defending header and also added a lot of quality in attacking. Besides his passing and run from deep position ability, Joel's attacking header and free kick skills made him the top scorer of the team with six goals in 2006–07, along with striker Christian Annan.

Joel changed his jersey number from 28 to 6 in season 2007–08, which he scored seven times and became the third top scorer in the team, and the top scoring defender among the Hong Kong First Division League.

=== South China ===
Joel joined South China at the beginning of the 2010 season. On 18 December 2011, he scored two goals, one with a header and the other with a penalty kick, to inflict the first defeat of Kitchee's league season. In January 2012, he was named the Most Valuable Player in the 2011-12 Hong Kong First Division League for December 2011 by the Hong Kong Sports Press Association.
