= Wang Xuanhong =

Chinese footballer

Wang Xuanhong 王选宏
Personal information
- Full name: Wang Xuanhong
- Date of birth: July 24, 1989 (age 37)
- Place of birth: Dalian, Liaoning, China
- Height: 1.83 m (6 ft 0 in)
- Position: Attacking midfielder

Team information
- Current team: Dalian Kewei (assistant coach)

Youth career
- Liaoning FC

Senior career*
| Years | Team | Apps | (Gls) |
| 2007–2011 | Dalian Shide | 77 | (8) |
| 2007–2008 | → Citizen (loan) | 8 | (10) |
| 2012 | Chongqing Lifan | 9 | (0) |
| 2013 | Dalian Aerbin | 0 | (0) |
| 2013 | → Qingdao Hainiu (loan) | 10 | (7) |
| 2014–2016 | Qingdao Huanghai | 71 | (11) |
| 2017–2019 | Beijing Renhe | 23 | (0) |
| 2020–2021 | Guizhou Hengfeng | 42 | (3) |
| 2022–2024 | Dalian Yingbo | 17 | (3) |
| 2025 | Dalian Kewei | | |

International career^{‡}
| 2004–2005 | China U-17 | | |

Managerial career
- 2025–: Dalian Kewei (assistant coach)
Medal record
Representing China
Men's football
AFC U-17 Championship
| Gold medal – first place | 2004 Japan | Team |
- * Club domestic league appearances and goals as of 29 April 2022 ‡ National team caps and goals as of 1 Jan 2012

Wang Xuanhong (simplified Chinese: 王选宏; traditional Chinese: 王選宏; pinyin: Wáng Xuǎnhóng; born July 24, 1989, in Dalian) is a Chinese former footballer, as a left-footed midfielder.

== Club career ==
Wang Xuanhong was loaned out to Citizen along with Yan Shipeng at the beginning of the 2007/08 Hong Kong First Division League season. His loan period at Citizen was to prove extremely productive when he scored ten league goals for them before he returned to Dalian Shide. His personal highlight came when he scored four goals against Hong Kong Rangers FC on the 16th of September 2007 in only his second competitive game for Citizen. After his personally successful loan at Citizen he would immediately return to China to begin his career with Dalian when he made his debut against Chengdu Blades on April 12, 2008, in a 2–1 defeat. Often coming on a substitute throughout much of his Dalian career it wasn't until the 2009 Chinese Super League season when Wang started to become regular within the team when he would score his first goal for the club on September 12, 2009, against Changsha Ginde in a 1–1 draw.

In January 2017, Wang transferred to China League One side Beijing Renhe.

On 20 February 2026, Wang joined Chinese Champions League club Dalian Kewei as player-coach.

== Career statistics ==
Statistics accurate as of match played 31 December 2020.

Appearances and goals by club, season and competition
| Club | Season | League | | | National Cup | | League Cup | | Continental | | Total | |
| Club | Season | Division | Apps | Goals | Apps | Goals | Apps | Goals | Apps | Goals | Apps | Goals |
|---|---|---|---|---|---|---|---|---|---|---|---|---|
| Dalian Shide | 2007 | Chinese Super League | 0 | 0 | - | | - | | - | | 0 | 0 |
| Dalian Shide | 2008 | Chinese Super League | 21 | 0 | - | | - | | - | | 21 | 0 |
| Dalian Shide | 2009 | Chinese Super League | 22 | 2 | - | | - | | - | | 22 | 2 |
| Dalian Shide | 2010 | Chinese Super League | 26 | 5 | - | | - | | - | | 26 | 5 |
| Dalian Shide | 2011 | Chinese Super League | 8 | 1 | 1 | 0 | - | | - | | 9 | 1 |
| Dalian Shide | Total | | 77 | 8 | 1 | 0 | 0 | 0 | 0 | 0 | 78 | 8 |
| Citizen AA (loan) | 2007–08 | Hong Kong First Division League | 8 | 10 | 0 | 0 | 0 | 0 | - | | 8 | 10 |
| Chongqing Lifan | 2012 | China League One | 9 | 0 | 0 | 0 | - | | - | | 9 | 0 |
| Dalian Aerbin | 2013 | Chinese Super League | 0 | 0 | 0 | 0 | - | | - | | 0 | 0 |
| Qingdao Hainiu (loan) | 2013 | China League Two | 10 | 7 | - | | - | | - | | 10 | 7 |
| Qingdao Huanghai | 2014 | China League One | 28 | 5 | 6 | 2 | - | | - | | 34 | 7 |
| Qingdao Huanghai | 2015 | China League One | 15 | 3 | 0 | 0 | - | | - | | 15 | 3 |
| Qingdao Huanghai | 2016 | China League One | 28 | 3 | 1 | 1 | - | | - | | 29 | 4 |
| Qingdao Huanghai | Total | | 71 | 11 | 7 | 3 | 0 | 0 | 0 | 0 | 78 | 14 |
| Beijing Renhe | 2017 | China League One | 4 | 0 | 0 | 0 | - | | - | | 4 | 0 |
| Beijing Renhe | 2018 | Chinese Super League | 7 | 0 | 1 | 0 | - | | - | | 8 | 0 |
| Beijing Renhe | 2019 | Chinese Super League | 13 | 0 | 1 | 0 | - | | - | | 14 | 0 |
| Beijing Renhe | Total | | 24 | 0 | 2 | 0 | 0 | 0 | 0 | 0 | 26 | 0 |
| Guizhou Hengfeng | 2020 | China League One | 12 | 0 | 1 | 0 | - | | - | | 13 | 0 |
| Career total | | | 203 | 36 | 11 | 3 | 0 | 0 | 0 | 0 | 214 | 39 |

== Honours ==
=== Club ===
Qingdao Hainiu

- China League Two: 2013

=== International ===
China U-17 national team

- AFC U-17 Championship: 2004
