= Poon Yiu Cheuk =

Hong Kong footballer and coach (born 1977)

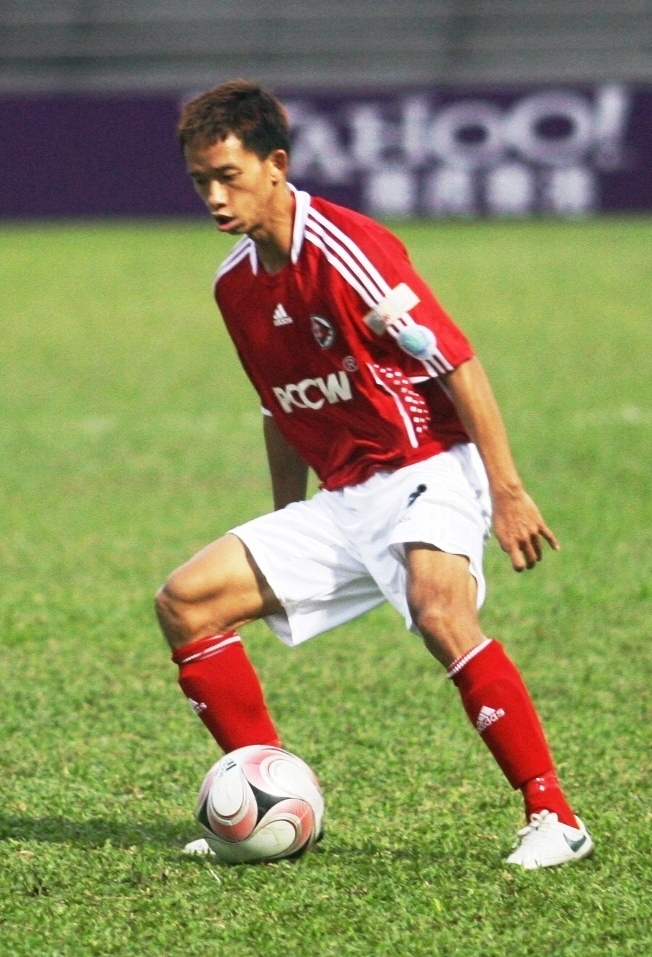

Personal information
- Date of birth: 19 September 1977 (age 49)
- Place of birth: Hong Kong
- Height: 1.73 m (5 ft 8 in)
- Position: Left-back

Youth career
- Eastern
- Hong Kong Rangers

Senior career*
Years	Team	Apps	(Gls)
1995–1997	Hong Kong Rangers	0	(0)
1997–2008	Happy Valley	206	(17)
2008–2011	South China	39	(0)
2011	Sham Shui Po	9	(0)
2012	Pegasus	4	(0)
2015	Tung Sing		
2017–2018	South China	21	(2)

International career
1998–2010	Hong Kong	62	(4)

Managerial career
- 2012: Pegasus (assistant coach)
- Shatin
- Tung Sing
- 2017–2021: South China
- * Club domestic league appearances and goals

Poon Yiu Cheuk (Chinese: 潘耀焯; Jyutping: pun^{1} jiu^{6} coek^{3}; born 19 September 1977) is a Hong Kong football manager and former professional footballer who played as a left-back.

== Club career ==
=== Sham Shui Po ===
Poon left South China to join Sham Shui Po during the summer of 2011. He was the most experienced local player at the club and was appointed as the club captain. Besides, he also coached Sham Shui Po U-19 when he joined the club.

=== Pegasus ===
Poon joined Pegasus during the winter transfer window. He also became the assistant coach at the club.

Poon retired from professional football after the end of the 2011–12 season.

== International career ==
On 19 November 1998, Poon made his international debut for the Hong Kong national team in a friendly match against Vietnam.

Having 62 international caps in total, Poon is one of the most capped players in the Hong Kong national team.

== Career statistics ==
=== Club ===
As of 31 August 2012

Club performance			League		Cup		League Cup		Continental		Total	
Season	Club	League	Apps	Goals	Apps	Goals	Apps	Goals	Apps	Goals	Apps	Goals
Hong Kong			League		FA Cup & Shield		League Cup		Asia		Total	
1995–96	Rangers	First Division	0	0	?	?	-		-		?	?
1996–97	Rangers	First Division	0	0	?	?	-		-		?	?
1997–98	Happy Valley	First Division	18	0	?	?	-		-		?	?
1998–99	Happy Valley	First Division	0	0	?	?	-		?	?	?	?
1999–00	Happy Valley	First Division	20	0	?	?	-		-		?	?
2000–01	Happy Valley	First Division	30	0	?	?	?	?	?	?	?	?
2001–02	Happy Valley	First Division	0	0	?	?	?	?	?	?	?	?
2002–03	Happy Valley	First Division	22	1	?	?	?	?	-		?	?
2003–04	Happy Valley	First Division	23	1	?	?	?	?	?	?	?	?
2004–05	Happy Valley	First Division	25	2	?	?	?	?	?	?	?	?
2005–06	Happy Valley	First Division	20	3	?	?	?	?	6	0	?	?
2006–07	Happy Valley	First Division	23	5	?	?	?	?	6	1	?	?
2007–08	Happy Valley	First Division	25	5	?	?	?	?	-		?	?
2008–09	South China	First Division	19	0	4	0	0	0	6	0	29	0
2009–10	South China	First Division	10	0	2	0	-		7	0	19	0
2010–11	South China	First Division	10	0	4	0	1	0	3	0	18	0
2011–12	Sham Shui Po	First Division	9	0	0	0	0	0	-		9	0
2011–12	Pegasus	First Division	4	0	0	0	0	0	-		4	0
Total	Hong Kong		258	17	?	?	?	?	?	?	?	?

=== International ===
As of 17 November 2010

National team	Year	Apps	Goals
Hong Kong	1998	3	0
Hong Kong	1999	3	0
Hong Kong	2000	3	0
Hong Kong	2001	6	0
Hong Kong	2002	0	0
Hong Kong	2003	13	1
Hong Kong	2004	6	0
Hong Kong	2005	3	1
Hong Kong	2006	9	0
Hong Kong	2007	7	1
Hong Kong	2008	1	0
Hong Kong	2009	4	1
Hong Kong	2010	4	0
Total		62	4

== Honours ==
Happy Valley

- Hong Kong First Division: 1998–99, 2000–01, 2002–03, 2005–06
- Hong Kong Senior Shield: 1997–98, 2003–04
- Hong Kong FA Cup: 1999–00, 2003–04

South China

- Hong Kong First Division: 2007–08, 2008–09, 2009–10
- Hong Kong Senior Shield: 2009–10
- Hong Kong FA Cup: 2010–11
