= Leko (footballer) =

Brazilian footballer

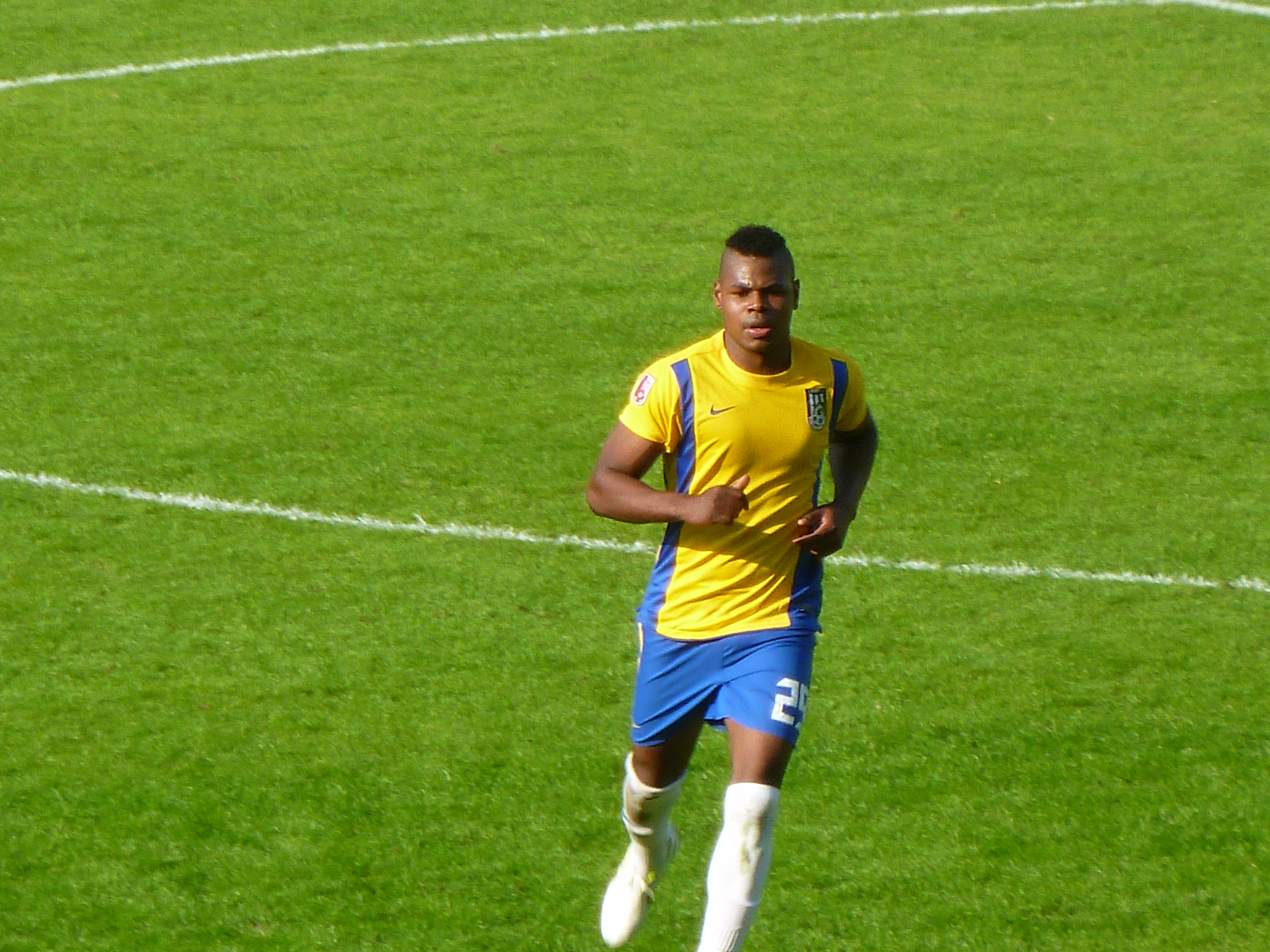

Personal information
- Full name: Alexandro da Silva Santos
- Date of birth: March 23, 1985 (age 41)
- Place of birth: Paraíba do Sul, Rio de Janeiro, Brazil
- Height: 1.80 m (5 ft 11 in)
- Position: Striker

Team information
- Current team: Citizen

Senior career*
Years	Team	Apps	(Gls)
2007–2011	Citizen	10	(5)
2011	East Bengal	1	(0)
2011–2012	Sham Shui Po	6	(0)
2020–2022	Citizen	0	(0)
- * Club domestic league appearances and goals

Alexandro da Silva Santos (Chinese: 尼高 Leko; born March 23, 1985), better known as Leko, is a retired Brazilian striker who concluded his football career with the Hong Kong First Division club Citizen on August 1, 2022.

== Club career ==
=== East Bengal ===
In February Santos signed for Indian I-League club East Bengal and played his first game on March 6, 2011, in a 2–1 loss to Mumbai.

=== Sham Shui Po ===
Leko signed with Sham Shui Po on 5 January 2012.
