= Maxwell (footballer, born 1979) =

Brazilian footballer

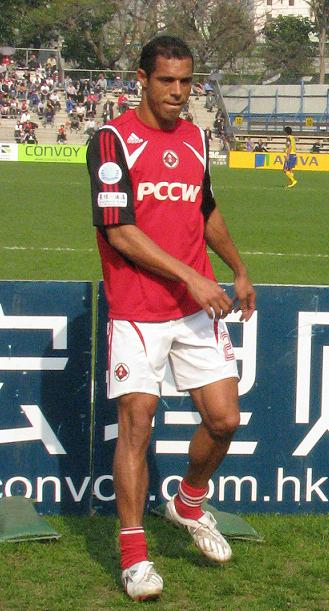

Personal information
- Full name: Maxwell Santos Silva
- Date of birth: April 23, 1979 (age 47)
- Place of birth: Brazil
- Height: 1.81 m (5 ft 11 in)
- Position: Forward

Team information
- Current team: Arabi Club

Senior career*
Years	Team	Apps	(Gls)
1996–1998	Bahia	?	(?)
1998–2000	Serrano	?	(?)
2000–2004	América	?	(?)
2004	Caxias	?	(?)
2004–2005	Esteghlal Tehran	?	(?)
2005–2006	Matsubara	?	(?)
2006–2007	Arabi Club	?	(?)
2007	Riffa Club	?	(?)
2007–2008	South China	29	(16)
2009	Arabi Club	?	(?)
2010	Al-Shorta		
- * Club domestic league appearances and goals as of 7 January 2009

Maxwell Santos Silva (born 23 April 1979), known as just Maxwell, is a Brazilian former football player, He played as a forward.

He joined South China on 5 September 2007.

On 28 December 2008, SCAA's Steven Lo said on his blog that Maxwell will be leaving SCAA during the January 2009 transfer window for either Australia's A League or Dubai, where he will receive double his current SCAA salary. He finally moved back to his former club Arabi Club in Dubai.

== Career statistics in Hong Kong ==
Club	Season	League		Senior Shield		League Cup		FA Cup		AFC Cup		Total	
Club	Season	Apps	Goals	Apps	Goals	Apps	Goals	Apps	Goals	Apps	Goals	Apps	Goals
South China	2007-08	17 (0)	11	2 (0)	0	6 (0)	4	1 (0)	0	NA	NA	26 (0)	15
South China	2008-09	11 (1)	5	2 (0)	1	0 (0)	0	0 (0)	0	NA	NA	13 (1)	6
South China	All	28 (1)	16	4 (0)	1	6 (0)	4	1 (0)	0	NA	NA	39 (1)	21
