= Dongguan Stadium =

Sports venue in Dongguan, Guangdong, China

Coordinates: 23°01′36″N 113°44′47″E

Dongguan Stadium (Chinese: 东莞体育场) is a multi-purpose stadium in Dongguan, Guangdong, China. It is currently used mostly for football matches. The stadium holds 22,000 people. The stadium was built in 1994. Dongguan United used the venue for home games in 2023.
