= Tommy Giacomelli =

Brazilian footballer (born 1974)

Personal information
- Full name: Tommy Adriano Giacomelli
- Date of birth: 29 April 1974 (age 52)
- Place of birth: Brazil
- Height: 1.87 m (6 ft 2 in)
- Position: Forward

Senior career*
| Years | Team | Apps | (Gls) |
| –1998 | Ponte Preta | | |
| 1998–1999 | Sai Kung Friends | | |
| 1999–2000 | Happy Valley | | |
| 2000–2004 | Sagesse | | (41) |
| 2004–2005 | Apollon Kalamarias | | |
| 2005–2006 | Indipendente | | |
| 2006–2007 | Sagesse | | (14) |
| 2007–2008 | Happy Valley | | (7) |
| 2008–2009 | Nejmeh | | (5) |
- * Club domestic league appearances and goals

Tommy Adriano Giacomelli (born 29 April 1974), sometimes known as just Tommy, is a Brazilian former professional footballer.

Giacomelli played in Brazil for Ponte Preta and Indipendente, in Hong Kong for Sai Kung Friends and Happy Valley, in Lebanon for Sagesse and Nejmeh, and in Greece for Apollon Kalamarias. He won the Hong Kong Footballer of the Year in 2000, being the second foreign player to win the honour after Dimitre Kalkanov, who won the prize in 1998.

== Club career ==
After playing for Ponte Preta in his native country, Giacomelli joined Hong Kong team Sai Kung Friends in 1998. After one season, he joined Happy Valley before moving to Lebanon in 2000, where he signed for Sagesse. At Sagesse, Tommy scored 41 league goals during his four-year stay.

In 2004, Giacomelli moved to Greece where he signed for Apollon Kalamarias before returning to Brazil in 2005 signing for Indipendente. In 2006, Giacomelli returned to Sagesse where he scored 14 goals during the season, before moving once again to Happy Valley in 2007. The following year, Giacomelli returned to Lebanon at Nejmeh where he scored five league goals and ended his career with a total of 60 Lebanese Premier League goals.

== Honours ==
Individual

- Lebanese Premier League Team of the Season: 2000–01
