= Festus Baise =

Hong Kong footballer

Festus Baise 法圖斯
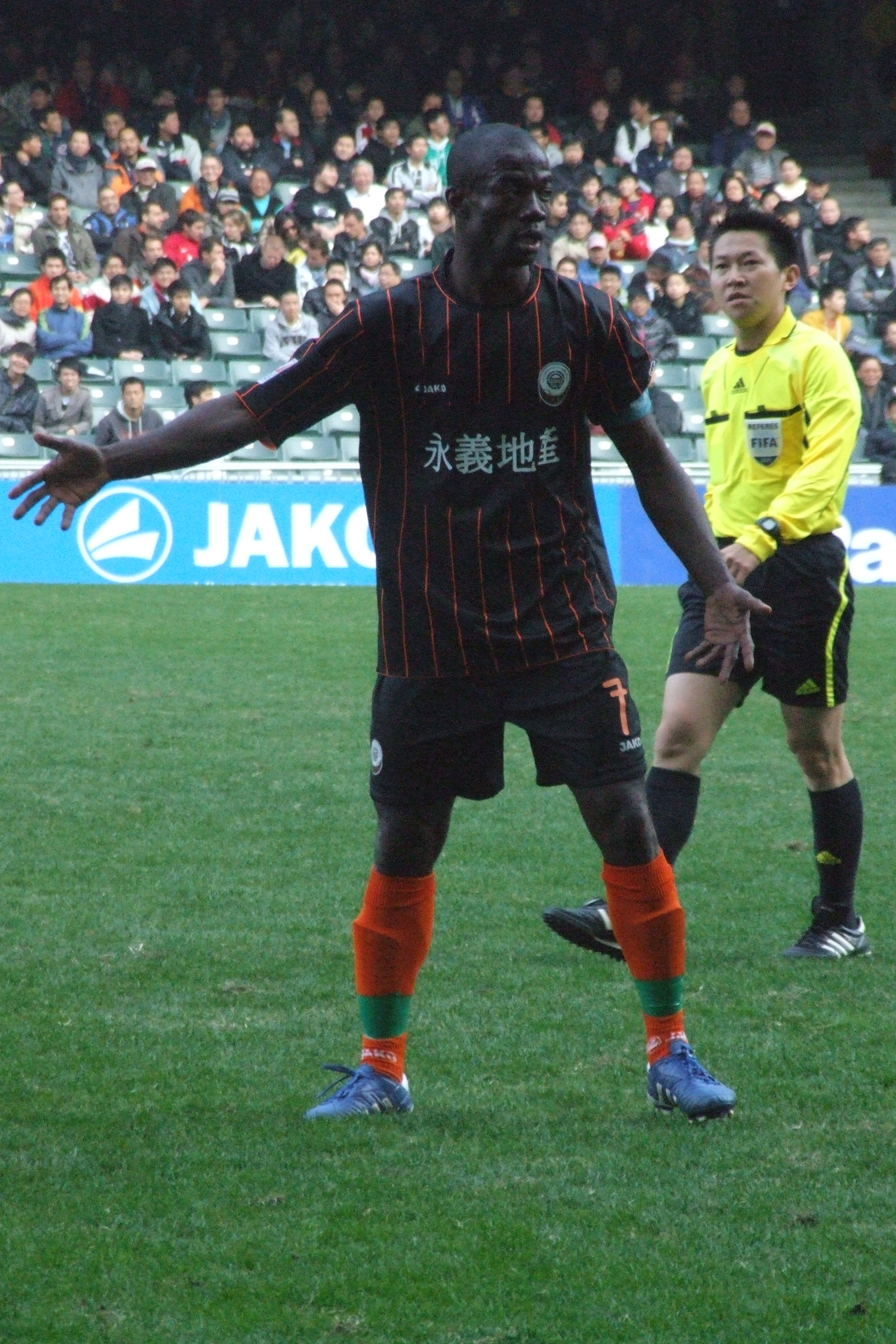
- Festus with Citizen in 2010

Personal information
- Date of birth: 11 April 1980 (age 46)
- Place of birth: Lagos, Nigeria
- Height: 1.80 m (5 ft 11 in)
- Position: Centre back

Senior career*
Years	Team	Apps	(Gls)
2004–2005	Mutual		
2005	South China	6	(1)
2005–2014	Citizen	151	(24)
2014–2015	Pegasus	16	(4)
2015–2016	Eastern	5	(1)
2016–2019	Guizhou Hengfeng	87	(10)
2021–2023	North District	13	(3)

International career
2015–2019	Hong Kong	28	(2)
- * Club domestic league appearances and goals as of 6 June 2021

Festus Baise
- Traditional Chinese: 法圖斯
- Simplified Chinese: 法图斯
Transcriptions
Standard Mandarin
- Hanyu Pinyin: Fǎtúsī
Yue: Cantonese
- Jyutping: Faat3tou4si1
- Hong Kong Romanisation: Fa(h) To Si
- IPA: [fat̚˧ tʰɔw˩ si˥]

Festus Baise (Chinese: 法圖斯; born 11 April 1980) is a former professional footballer who played as a centre back. Born in Nigeria, he represented Hong Kong internationally.

== Club career ==
=== Early career ===
Festus Baise was born in Lagos, Nigeria and was advised to go to Hong Kong and have tryouts with top tier clubs Happy Valley and Sun Hei. He would receive an offer from second tier club Mutual where he started his football career in the 2004–05 league season. Baise would join top tier club South China half way through the season and played in six games, scoring one goal.

=== Citizen ===
On 16 December 2011, Baise scored an own goal, described as a reverse scorpion kick, past his goalkeeper Tse Tak Him in a 3–2 win over Sun Hei in the league match. It was selected as the fifth-best own goal of all time by The Daily Telegraph's Steve Wilson.

On 21 March 2012, Baise struck a last-minute winner as Citizen edged out Myanmar's Yangon United 2–1 at Mongkok Stadium to record a first win of the 2012 AFC Cup campaign in Group G.

=== Guizhou Hengfeng ===
On 13 December 2015, Chinese club Guizhou Hengfeng signed Baise from Eastern, citing his performances against China in two matches during 2018 FIFA World Cup qualification. He arrived at the club on 1 January 2016.

On 1 March 2018, Guizhou announced that Baise had signed a new contract through the end of 2019. He left the club after his contract expired.

== International career ==
Baise was born in Nigeria, and is of Ghanaian descent. In December 2012, Baise confirmed that he had applied to the Hong Kong Immigration Department for naturalisation as a Chinese citizen. He was granted the Hong Kong SAR Passport on 7 March 2015 and Baise made his international debut for Hong Kong against Guam on 28 March 2015.

== Career statistics ==
=== Club ===
As of 31 December 2019.

Appearances and goals by club, season and competition
Club	Season	League			National Cup		League Cup		Continental		Other		Total	
Club	Season	Division	Apps	Goals	Apps	Goals	Apps	Goals	Apps	Goals	Apps	Goals	Apps	Goals
Mutual	2004–05	Hong Kong Second Division League			-		-		-		-			
South China	2004–05	Hong Kong First Division League	6	1	0	0	0	0	-		0 (Note: Appearances in Hong Kong Senior Challenge Shield)	0	6	1
Citizen	2005–06	Hong Kong First Division League	19	4	0	0	0	0	-		0	0	19	4
Citizen	2006–07	Hong Kong First Division League	17	4	0	0	0	0	-		0	0	17	4
Citizen	2007–08	Hong Kong First Division League	24	1	0	0	0	0	-		0	0	24	1
Citizen	2008–09	Hong Kong First Division League	21	2	0	0	0	0	-		0	0	21	2
Citizen	2009–10	Hong Kong First Division League	5	0	0	0	0	0	-		0	0	5	0
Citizen	2010–11	Hong Kong First Division League	15	2	0	0	0	0	-		0	0	15	2
Citizen	2011–12	Hong Kong First Division League	16	4	1	0	2	2	6	1	0	0	25	7
Citizen	2012–13	Hong Kong First Division League	18	5	1	0	0	0	-		7	2	26	7
Citizen	2013–14	Hong Kong First Division League	16	2	2	0	0	0	-		0	0	18	2
Citizen	Total		151	24	4	0	2	2	6	1	7	2	170	29
Pegasus	2014–15	Hong Kong Premier League	16	4	0	0	3	1	-		2 (Note: One appearance in Hong Kong Senior Challenge Shield, One appearance and one goal in AFC Cup Play-off)	1	21	6
Eastern	2015–16	Hong Kong Premier League	5	1	0	0	1	0	-		1	0	7	1
Guizhou Hengfeng	2016	China League One	28	6	0	0	-		-		-		28	6
Guizhou Hengfeng	2017	Chinese Super League	23	3	0	0	-		-		-		23	3
Guizhou Hengfeng	2018	Chinese Super League	14	0	0	0	-		-		-		14	0
Guizhou Hengfeng	2019	China League One	22	1	0	0	-		-		-		22	1
Guizhou Hengfeng	Total		87	10	0	0	0	0	0	0	0	0	87	10
Career total			265	40	4	0	6	3	6	1	10	3	291	47

=== International ===
As of 11 June 2019.

National team	Year	Apps	Goals
Hong Kong	2015	10	0
Hong Kong	2016	6	0
Hong Kong	2017	5	0
Hong Kong	2018	6	2
Hong Kong	2019	1	0
Total		28	2

=== International goals ===
Scores and results list Hong Kong's goal tally first.

No.	Date	Venue	Opponent	Score	Result	Competition
1.	16 October 2018	Wibawa Mukti Stadium, Cikarang, Indonesia	Indonesia	1–1	1–1	Friendly
2.	16 November 2018	Taipei Municipal Stadium, Taipei, Taiwan	Mongolia	4–1	5–1	2019 EAFF E-1 Football Championship qualification

== Personal life ==
Born in Lagos, Nigeria, Baise is of Ghanaian descent. In December 2012, Baise confirmed that he had applied to the Hong Kong Immigration Department for naturalisation as a Chinese citizen. He was granted a Hong Kong SAR passport on 7 March 2015. His brother, Henry Baise Okwara (or 亨利, born 16 Apr 1992), is also a footballer.

== Honours ==
=== Club ===
Citizen

- Hong Kong Senior Shield: 2010–11

Eastern

- Hong Kong Premier League: 2015–16
