= Wilfred Bamnjo =

Cameroonian footballer

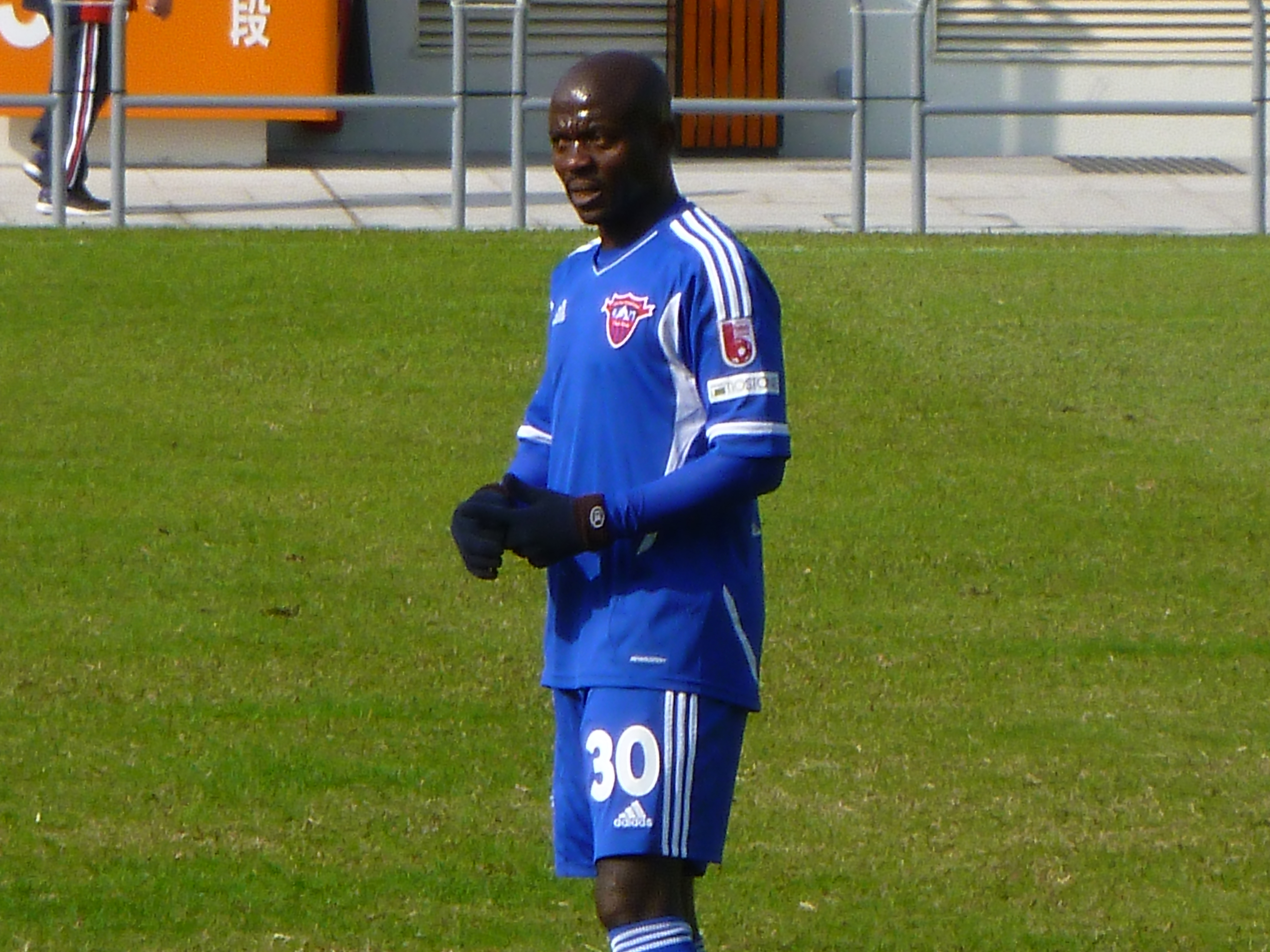

Personal information
- Full name: Wilfred Ndzedzeni Bamnjo
- Date of birth: 27 March 1980 (age 46)
- Place of birth: Yaounde, Cameroon
- Height: 1.77 m (5 ft 10 in)
- Position: Defensive midfielder

Senior career*
Years	Team	Apps	(Gls)
2003–2004	Kitchee	14	(2)
2004–2005	Persijatim	21	(1)
2005–2007	Kitchee	16	(0)
2007–2008	Persikota	23	(3)
2008–2009	Kitchee	27	(4)
2009–2011	Sun Hei	11	(1)
2011–2012	Tuen Mun SA	8	(0)
2012–2013	Hong Kong Rangers	11	(2)
2013–2014	Happy Valley	87	(27)
- * Club domestic league appearances and goals as of 8 June 2013

Wilfred Bamnjo (Chinese: 賓曹, born 27 March 1980 in Cameroon) was a Cameroonian former football player. His position was defensive midfielder.

== Biography ==
=== Kitchee SC ===
Bamnjo played for Kitchee SC, then a newly promoted club in the Hong Kong First Division, during the 2003–04 season. On 16 November 2003, Bamnjo scored his first goal for Kitchee, an equaliser, in a 3–1 win against Fukien Athletic Club.

=== Persijatim ===
Bamnjo joined Indonesian top-flight club Persijatim during the 2004–05 season.

=== Kitchee SC ===
Bamnjo rejoined Kitchee after a season in Indonesia. On 11 December 2005, Bamnjo scored the winner for Kitchee in a 4–3 win against Happy Valley AA in the Hong Kong League Cup Final – Kitchee's first silverware in 41 years. Bamnjo also played in the Hong Kong Senior Challenge Shield Final, in which he scored a disallowed goal in a 3–0 win against Happy Valley AA. This is Kitchee's second trophy in the 2005–06 season.

In the 2006–07 season, Bamnjo scored 4 goals in the Hong Kong First Division and helped Kitchee finish as runner-up in the league. Bamnjo was injured during warm-up in the Hong Kong League Cup Final, that Kitchee beat Happy Valley AA 2–1 to win the trophy two consecutive seasons.

On 21 July 2007, it was reported that Bamnjo tried to engineer a move to Indonesia side Persikota Tangerang without Kitchee's permission and did not return to training after the summer break. Bamnjo eventually returned to Kitchee in October in time for the 2007–08 season. Bamnjo was suspended and did not play in the 1–3 loss against Eastern AA in the Hong Kong Senior Challenge Shield Final. Bamnjo did play in the Hong Kong League Cup Final, in which he scored in a 2–4 loss to South China AA.

=== Sun Hei ===
Bamnjo joined Sun Hei for the 2008–09 season following his release from Kitchee. On 29 November 2008, Bamnjo scored two goals to knock his former club Kitchee out of the Hong Kong Senior Challenge Shield quarter-final with a 3–2 win.

=== Tuen Mun SA ===
Bamnjo played for Tuen Mun SA, a club that was in the Hong Kong First Division, during the 2011–12 season. He was released by Tuen Mun in July 2012.

=== Biu Chun Rangers ===
On 28 September 2012, Bamnjo joined Biu Chun Rangers for free after being released by Tuen Mun.

=== Happy Valley AA ===
In June 2013, Bamnjo joined Happy Valley AA, a club that was newly promoted back to the Hong Kong First Division for the 2013–14 season. On 5 January 2014, Bamnjo was one of the seven players and coaching staff arrested by the Hong Kong Independent Commission Against Corruption (ICAC) for allegations with match-fixing. On 6 January 2014, the homes of Bamnjo and five other Happy Valley players were raided by the ICAC as the officials stepped up their investigation into alleged match-fixing. On 10 January 2014, Bamnjo, who was released on bail, returned to training for the first time since the match-fixing scandal. On 12 February 2014, Bamnjo's season was effectively finished as Happy Valley AA, the club that Bamnjo played for, was suspended by the Hong Kong Football Association from all league and FA Cup fixtures for the rest of the 2013–14 season. On 21 February 2014, it has emerged that contracted Happy Valley players (including Bamnjo) may not get paid from March onward because of Happy Valley's suspension from the League. Despite being contracted with Happy Valley, an official from the HKFA was quoted that Bamnjo is free to seek transfer to clubs overseas. On 26 March 2014, Bamnjo (and other Happy Valley players) went to the Hong Kong Labour Department to make claims against Happy Valley AA for unpaid and outstanding wages worth around 100,000 Hong Kong dollars. On 12 June 2014, Bamnjo won the court case against Happy Valley AA for unpaid wages and was awarded 57,500 Hong Kong dollars in settlement.

=== Fu Moon ===
After a ten year break from football, Bamnjo returned to football for a season signing with Fu Moon.

== Honours ==
Kitchee

- Hong Kong League Cup: 2005–06, 2006–07
- Hong Kong Senior Shield: 2005–06

Sun Hei

- Hong Kong League Cup: 2008–09
