= Siumar =

Brazilian footballer

Personal information
- Full name: Siumar Ferreira Nazaré
- Date of birth: June 7, 1983 (age 43)
- Place of birth: Eunápolis, Bahia, Brazil
- Height: 1.78 m (5 ft 10 in)
- Position: Attacking midfielder

Senior career*
Years	Team	Apps	(Gls)
2002–2004	Padova	9	(0)
2004–2005	Ivrea	19	(1)
2005–2006	Treviso	1	(0)
2006–2007	Eunápolis	?	(?)
2007–2008	Hong Kong Rangers	10	(2)
2008–2009	Eastern	11	(1)
- * Club domestic league appearances and goals as of 21 February 2009

Siumar Ferreira Nazaré (Chinese: 邵馬 Siumar; born June 7, 1983, in Eunápolis, Bahia, Brazil), also known as Mamá in Brazil, is a Brazilian former professional footballer. He played for Italian side Treviso and made one appearance in Serie A, against Udinese in the 2005–06 season.
