= Lanwa F.C. =

Chinese football club

Lanwa FC
- Full name: Dongguan Lanwa Football Club
- Nickname(s): Redbull
- Founded: 2005 as Lanwa
- Dissolved: 2009
- Ground: Dongguan Stadium; Dongguan, Guangdong
- Capacity: 22,000
- Chairman: Chen Weidong
- Head Coach: Piao Junjie
- League: Hong Kong First Division
- 2007–08: First Division, 8th
Home colours	Away colours

Lanwa FC (Chinese: 聯華紅牛), officially Dongguan Lanwa Football Club (simplified Chinese: 联华足球俱乐部; traditional Chinese: 聯華足球俱樂部) was a Chinese professional association football club located in Dongguan, China. The club was founded in 1999 and played in the Chinese and Hong Kong football systems.

== History ==
Lanwa was founded in 1999 as Gansu Tianma (Chinese: 甘肃天马), and originally played in the Chinese football system. Following its relegation from the Yi League (Chinese Third Division), it was bought by Dongguan Dongcheng company who renamed the club and moved the club to the Hong Kong football system pyramid.

=== Name changes ===
- 1999–2001: Gansu Tianma SC (Chinese: 甘肃天马)
- 2001: Lanzhou Huanghe F.C (Chinese: 兰州黄河)
- 2002: Gansu Nongken FC(Chinese: 甘肃农垦)
- 2003: Ningbo Yaoma FC (Chinese: 宁波耀马)
- 2004–2005: Dongguan Dongcheng FC (Chinese: 东莞东城)
- 2005–2009: Lanwa FC (Dongguan Lanwa FC) (Chinese: 东莞联华)

== Recent seasons ==
Season		Pos.	Pl.	W	D	L	GS	GA	P	Senior Shield	League Cup	FA Cup	Asia	Notes
2005–06	1D	5	14	4	5	5	14	20	17	semi-final	group stage	first round		
2006–07	1D	5	18	8	2	8	37	26	26	semi-final	group stage	first round		
2007–08	1D									quarter-final	group stage			

== See also ==
- List of association football clubs playing in the league of another country
- Gansu
