= Rodrigo (footballer, born 1978) =

Brazilian footballer

Personal information
- Full name: Rodrigo Andreis Galvão
- Date of birth: 5 November 1978 (age 47)
- Place of birth: São Leopoldo, Brazil
- Height: 1.80 m (5 ft 11 in)
- Position: Striker

Senior career*
| Years | Team | Apps | (Gls) |
| ? | Cruzeiro | ? | (?) |
| ? | São José | ? | (?) |
| 2022 | F.C. Marco | ? | (?) |
| 2005 | Criciúma | ? | (?) |
| 2006 | Ulbra | ? | (?) |
| 2007 | Guaratinguetá | ? | (?) |
| 2007–2008 | Eastern | 23 | (10) |
| 2011 | Tarxien | 10 | (2) |
| 2013–2014 | Aimoré | | |
- * Club domestic league appearances and goals

Rodrigo Andreis Galvão (Chinese: 洛迪高, born 5 November 1978), also known as Rodrigo, is a former Brazilian professional footballer who played as a striker.

== Club career ==
Rodrigo has a high profile with previous experience in big clubs in Brazil. In the 2007–08 season, Rodrigo was named as the Top Scorer of the Hong Kong First Division League, scoring 18 goals. After that experience, he left for ABC, which is a highly renomated team in Brazil and he also did well there, where he was a first team important player. At the beginning of the 2011–2012 season, Rodrigo flattered interest from Tarxien Rainbows F.C. from the Maltese Premier League and after some discussions, an agreement was reached between both parties to seal a one-year contract with the Rainbows.

== Honours ==
Eastern

- Hong Kong Senior Shield: 2007–08

Awards and achievements
| Preceded by Lico; Jaimes McKee; Tales Schütz; Wong Chun Yue | Hong Kong Senior Shield top scorer 2007–08 | Succeeded by Guy Junior Ondoua |
| Preceded by Inaugural | Hong Kong League Cup Best Player Award; 2007–08 | Succeeded by Incumbent |
