= Workable FC =

Defunct association football club Hong Kong

Workable
- Full name: Workable Football Club
- Founded: 2007
- Dissolved: 2008
- Ground: Mong Kok Stadium; Kowloon, Hong Kong
- Capacity: 8,500
- Chairman: (Hong Kong) Lam Hok Ling
- League: Hong Kong First Division
- 2007–08: First Division, 9th
| Home colours | Away colours |

Workable Football Club (Chinese: 華家堡足球會) was a Hong Kong football club which played in the Hong Kong First Division League in the 2007–08 season. It borrowed the entities of Shek Kip Mei to compete in the league.

== History ==
The team got the 1st runner-up in Hong Kong Third A Division League in 2005–06 season and qualified into Third Division League Final Round to fight for 2 promotion positions among 4 teams. Shek Kip Mei topped the table and was promoted to Second Division.

After the promotion, the team added a few former Hong Kong national football team players to strengthen the team for further promotion to the First Division. The team finished second in the Second Division in the 2006–07 season and has been promoted to the First Division in 2007–08.

After the promotion, the team obtained an HK$4,000,000 naming sponsorship from Workable Corporation and was named as Workable Football Club to compete in First Division League. The team released all the promotion heroes in Shek Kip Mei and obtained a few players from the extinct Hong Kong 08 as the stem of team construction.

They played its debut match in First Division on 8 September 2007, drawing 2–2 with Tai Po in Mong Kok Stadium. The match was also highlighted by that Workable manager Chan Hiu Ming was the head coach of Tai Po in the previous season.

The club dissolved after the end of the 2007–08 season, which they finished 9th out of 10 teams in First Division.

== Sponsors ==
| Kit Manufacturer | Kit Sponsor |
|---|---|
| Adidas | Crocodile Garments |
