= Goran Stankovski =

Macedonian footballer

Personal information
- Date of birth: 20 November 1976 (age 49)
- Place of birth: Skopje, SR Macedonia, SFR Yugoslavia
- Height: 1.72 m (5 ft 8 in)
- Position: Attacking midfielder

Senior career*
| Years | Team | Apps | (Gls) |
| 1997–1998 | Sloga Jugomagnat | 1 | (0) |
| 1998–1999 | TeBe Berlin | 3 | (0) |
| 1999–2000 | TeBe Berlin II | 16 | (4) |
| 2000–2004 | Sloga Jugomagnat | 105 | (30) |
| 2004–2005 | Rabotnichki | 3 | (1) |
| 2005–2006 | Royal Antwerp | 28 | (5) |
| 2006–2007 | Rabotnički | 23 | (13) |
| 2007–2008 | Kitchee | 26 | (10) |
| 2008 | Makedonija | 4 | (1) |
| 2008–2009 | Sibir | 40 | (10) |
| 2009–2010 | Diyarbakırspor | 7 | (0) |
| 2010 | Dacia Chişinău | 8 | (0) |
| 2011–2014 | Drita | | |
| 2014–2015 | Shkupi | | |
| Total | | 272 | (82) |

International career
| 1998–2003 | Macedonia | 3 | (0) |

Managerial career
- 2015–2017: Rabotnički (youth)
- 2017–2018: Rabotnički
- 2018–2019: North Macedonia U19
- 2019–2020: North Macedonia U17
- * Club domestic league appearances and goals

Goran Stankovski (Macedonian: Горан Станковски; born 20 November 1976) is a Macedonian football coach and former player who played as a striker.

== Club career ==
Stankovski had two seasons with German second tier TeBe Berlin at the end of the 1990s. He then spent the 2005/06 season in the Belgian second tier with FC Antwerp.

== International career ==
He made his senior debut for Macedonia in a September 1998 friendly match against Egypt and has earned a total of 3 caps, scoring no goals. His final international was a June 2003 European Championship qualification match away against Turkey.

== Personal life ==
Stankovski's son, Luka, is also a professional footballer.
