= 2008–09 South China AA season =

South China
2008–09 season
- Chairman: Steven Lo (Football Management Committee)
- Head coach: Tsang Wai Chung (1 July-17 September); Liu Chun Fai (Caretaker Coach, 17 September-3 December)
- Hong Kong First Division: 1st
- Senior Shield: Semi-finals
- League Cup: Quarter-finals
- FA Cup: Semi-finals
- AFC Cup 2009: Round of 16 (in progress)
- Top goalscorer: League: Detinho; All: Detinho, Chan Siu Ki
- Highest home attendance: 8,972 (23 June 2009, Home United)
- Lowest home attendance: 987 (3 March 2009, FourWay Athletics)

== Events ==
- On 9 July 2008, South China goalkeeper Zhang Chunhui was sentenced imprisonment for 8 months due to inflicting grievous bodily harm upon another person. He injured a 17-year-old boy in Causeway Bay on 19 December 2008.
- On 14 July 2008, South China started their training for preparing the 2008-09 season.
- On 6 September 2008, South China kicked off the season by drawing 1–1 with Citizen in Hong Kong Stadium.
- On 17 September 2008, head coach Tsang Wai Chung quit the position due to health reason. He subsequently became an advisor for the team. Before this, he only led the team for one competitive match. Assistant coach Liu Chun Fai was appointed to be the caretaker of the team.
- On 20 September 2008, South China beat Tuen Mun Progoal by 9–0, which was the team's first win of the season and is currently the biggest win difference in the current league season.
- On 24 September 2008, Liu Chun Fai was officially appointed to be the head coach of the team.
- On 3 December 2008, Kim Pan-Gon was officially appointed to be the manager of the team.

== Transfers ==
=== In ===
- (China) Liang Zicheng (梁子成) from Rangers (return from loan)
- (Hong Kong) Au Yeung Yiu Chung (歐陽耀沖) from Workable
- (Hong Kong) Lo Chun Kit (盧俊傑) from Eastern
- (Hong Kong) Chan Siu Ki (陳肇麒) from Kitchee
- (Hong Kong) Lin Junsheng (林俊生) from Kitchee
- (Brazil) Vandré Monteiro (蒙迪路) from Happy Valley
- (Hong Kong) Poon Yiu Cheuk (潘耀焯) from Happy Valley
- (China) Li Weijun (李偉軍) from Anhui Jiufang (Chinese Football Association Jia League)
- Dame Dieng (戴恩) from ASC Diaraf (Senegal Premier League)
- (Portugal) Filipe (菲立) from Sporting C. de Pombal (Portuguese Second Division Serie C)
- (Brazil) Maxwell (麥士維) (free transfer)
- (Hong Kong) Ho Kwok Chuen (何國泉) from TSW Pegasus (loan)
- (Brazil) Sidraílson (沙域臣) from Santa Cruz (Brazilian Pernambuco Football Championship Série A1) (loan)
- (South Korea) Kim Yeon-Gun (金永健) from Seongnam Ilhwa Chunma (K-League)
- (Hong Kong) Wong Chin Hung (黃展鴻) from TSW Pegasus (return from loan)
- (Brazil) Cacá (卡卡) from Universidad L.P. (Segunda División B Groups 1-4)
- (Brazil) Fernando (費蘭度) from Independente (Campeonato Paulista de Futebol - Série A3)
- (Hong Kong) Lee Wai Lun (利偉倫) from Convoy Sun Hei
- (China) Liu Songwei (劉松偉) (free transfer)

=== Out ===
- (Brazil) Sidrailson (沙域臣) to Santa Cruz (return from loan)
- (Hong Kong) Chung Ho Yin (鍾皓賢) to Eastern
- (Brazil) Maxwell (麥士維) (contract terminated)
- (Brazil) Itaparica (伊達) to TSW Pegasus (loan)
- (Hong Kong) Yeung Ching Kwong (楊正光) to TSW Pegasus (loan)
- (Hong Kong) Cheng Siu Wai (鄭少偉) to TSW Pegasus (loan)
- (Hong Kong) Yip Chi Ho (葉志豪) to TSW Pegasus (loan)
- (China) Deng Jinghuang (鄧景煌) to TSW Pegasus (loan)
- (Hong Kong) Lin Junsheng (林俊生) to TSW Pegasus (loan)
- (Hong Kong) Lai Man Fei (賴文飛) to TSW Pegasus (loan)
- (Hong Kong) Chan Ka Chun (陳嘉晉) to TSW Pegasus (loan)
- (Hong Kong) Cheng King Ho (鄭璟昊) to TSW Pegasus (loan)
- (Portugal) Filipe (菲立) (unsuccessful trial)
- (Senegal) Dame Dieng (戴恩) (unsuccessful trial)
- (Hong Kong) Wong Chin Hung (黃展鴻) to TSW Pegasus (loan)
- (China) Li Weijun (李偉軍) (released)
- (Brazil) Vandré Monteiro (蒙迪路) (released)
- (Brazil) Maxwell (麥士維) to Al-Ittifaq (Bahraini Premier League)

== Pre-season friendlies & Warm-up Matches ==
Date	Opponents	Result	Scorers	Venue	Attendance	Reports
3 August 2008	TSW Pegasus	1 - 1; 5 - 3 (PSO)	Chan Siu Ki	Tin Shui Wai Sports Ground	1,000	SouthChinaFC.com (in Chinese)
11 August 2008	Guangzhou Pharmaceutical Team II	3 - 1	Tales Schütz, Filipe, Vandré Monteiro			SouthChinaFC.com (in Chinese)
13 August 2008	Guangzhou Pharmaceutical Team I	1 - 3
15 August 2008	TSW Pegasus	0 - 3		Guangdong Olympic Stadium	–	SCAA Official Blog (in Chinese)
25 August 2008	Guangzhou Pharmaceutical	1 - 1	Tales Schütz	Yuexiushan Stadium	1,000
28 August 2008	Happy Valley	2 - 1	Au Yeung Yiu Chung, Tales Schütz	South China Stadium	–	SCAA Official Blog (in Chinese)
12 November 2008	Guangdong Team for All China Games	1 - 1	Maxwell	Guangdong		SCAA Official Blog (in Chinese)
12 June 2009	NT Realty Wofoo Tai Po	4 - 2	Li Haiqiang×2, Kwok Kin Pong, Bai He	Mong Kok Stadium	1,808	SCAA Official Blog (in Chinese)
17 June 2009	Shenzhen Asia Travel	1 - 3	Fan Weijun	Shenzhen		SCAA Official Blog (in Chinese)

== HKFA Fourway Challenge Cup 7-A-Side Competition ==
Date	Round	Opponents	Result	Scorers	Venue	Attendance	Reports
30 August 2008	First Round A	Convoy Sun Hei Team A	1 - 4	Li Ling Fung	Mong Kok Stadium	475	HKFA.com
30 August 2008	First Round B	Fourway Team B	0 - 3		Mong Kok Stadium	475	HKFA.com

== Coolpoint Ventilation First Division League ==
Date	Round	Opponents	Result	Scorers	Venue	Attendance	Position	Reports
6 September 2008	1st	Citizen	1 - 1	Detinho 72'	Hong Kong Stadium	2,523	2nd	HKFA.com
	2nd	No competition						
20 September 2008	3rd	Tuen Mun Progoal	9 - 0	Tales Schütz 31'; Chan Siu Ki 36' (pen.), 48', 70'; Detinho 50', 60', 62', 69'; Vandré Monteiro 76'	Mong Kok Stadium	2,142	4th	HKFA.com
28 September 2008	4th	Sheffield United	2 - 0	Chan Siu Ki 6'; Tales Schütz 25'	Hong Kong Stadium	1,728	4th	HKFA.com
8 October 2008 ^{1}	5th	TSW Pegasus	3 - 0 ^{2}	Tales Schütz 5'; Chan Wai Ho 29'	Yuen Long Stadium	2,537	6th	HKFA.com
12 October 2008	6th	Mutual	4 - 1	Chan Siu Ki 6' (pen.); Au Yeung Yiu Chung 48'; Tales Schütz 59', 90'	Hong Kong Stadium	1,501	4th	HKFA.com
19 October 2008	7th	Eastern	3 - 0	Cris 24'; Li Haiqiang 33'; Xu Yang 53' (o.g.)	Hong Kong Stadium	1,483	3rd	HKFA.com
24 October 2008	8th	Fourway	1 - 1	Detinho 89' (pen.)	Mong Kok Stadium	1,583	4th	HKFA.com
4 November 2008	9th	Happy Valley	2 - 1	Chan Wai Ho 9'; Maxwell 20'	Mong Kok Stadium	1,595	3rd	HKFA.com
9 November 2008	10th	Xiangxue Eisiti	2 - 0	Maxwell 42'; Au Yeung Yiu Chung 47'	Mong Kok Stadium	2,190	1st	HKFA.com
16 November 2008	11th	Kitchee	3 - 1	Man Pei Tak 12', Au Yeung Yiu Chung 57'; Maxwell 90'	Mong Kok Stadium	4,228	1st	HKFA.com
14 December 2008	12th	Convoy Sun Hei	7 - 0	Maxwell 2'; Detinho 4', 12', 61', 73'; Chan Siu Ki 8', 86'	Mong Kok Stadium	1,957	1st	HKFA.com
27 December 2008	13th	NTR WF Tai Po	1 - 0	Maxwell 88'	Tai Po Sports Ground	2,520	1st	HKFA.com
11 January 2009	14th	Citizen	2 - 1	Bai He 25'; Detinho 33' (pen.)	Mong Kok Stadium	3,569	1st	HKFA.com
	15th	No competition						
8 February 2009	16th	Tuen Mun Progoal	8 - 0	Cacá 10', 30', 88'; Kim Yeon-Gun 17'; Chan Siu Ki 50', 69'; Au Yeung Yiu Chung 52', 74'	Mong Kok Stadium	2,006	1st	HKFA.com
15 February 2009	17th	Sheffield United	3 - 1	Cacá 12', 55'; Detinho 54'	Mong Kok Stadium	1,622	1st	HKFA.com
24 February 2009	23rd	Xiangxue Eisiti	7 - 0	Au Yeung Yiu Chung 4', 53'; Cris 18'; Liang Zicheng 20'; Cacá 25'; Detinho 64'; Li Haiqiang 79'	Mong Kok Stadium	1,065	1st	HKFA.com
1 March 2009	19th	Mutual	6 - 0	Detinho 33', 46'; Bai He 63'; Man Pei Tak 67'; Li Haiqiang 73'; Chan Siu Ki 83'	Mong Kok Stadium	1,366	1st	HKFA.com
26 March 2009	18th	TSW Pegasus	0 - 0		Mong Kok Stadium	1,937	1st	HKFA.com
30 March 2009 ^{3}	21st	Fourway Athletics	0 - 0		Mong Kok Stadium	987	1st	HKFA.com
12 April 2009	20th	Eastern	2 - 0	Tales Schütz 6'; Chan Siu Ki 72'	Mong Kok Stadium	2,561	1st	HKFA.com
17 April 2009	22nd	Happy Valley	3 - 2	Chan Siu Ki 46'; Detinho 83', 90' (pen.)	Hong Kong Stadium	1,377	1st	HKFA.com
26 April 2009	24th	Kitchee	0 - 1		Hong Kong Stadium	2,847	1st	HKFA.com
1 May 2009	25th	Convoy Sun Hei	2 - 1	Wong Chin Hung 71'; Detinho 83'	Mong Kok Stadium	3,068	1st	HKFA.com
10 May 2009	26th	NTR Wofoo Tai Po	2 - 0	Kwok Kin Pong 32'; Chan Chi Hong 87'	Mong Kok Stadium	1,812	1st	HKFA.com

Note 1: Due to waterlogged pitch at the stadium, the match was postponed from 5 October to 8 October.
Note 2: Despite TSW Pegasus won by 3–2, the team used more than the allowed maximum of 6 foreign players at a time during the match. As a result, TSW Pegasus was sentenced a 0–3 loss and penalized for HK$10,000.
Note 3: For the consideration of the maintaining the pitch quality, the match was postponed from 29 March to 30 March.

Pos	Team	Pld	W	D	L	GF	GA	GD	Pts	Qualification or relegation
1	South China (C)	24	19	4	1	73	11	+62	61	AFC Cup 2010 Group stage
2	Kitchee	24	17	5	2	56	17	+39	56	
3	Citizen	24	13	8	3	51	23	+28	47	
4	Fourway	24	12	6	6	38	17	+21	42 (Note: FOU 1–0 CSH; CSH 1–0 FOU)	
5	Convoy Sun Hei	24	13	3	8	39	32	+7	42	

Updated to match(es) played on 10 May 2009. Source: The Hong Kong Football Association
Rules for classification: 1) points; 2) head-to-head points; 3) head-to-head goal difference; 4) head-to-head goals scored; 5) goal difference; 6) number of goals scored.
(C) Champions

== HKFA Eisiti Senior Shield ==
Date	Round	Opponents	Result	Scorers	Venue	Attendance	Reports
30 November 2008	Quarter Final	Citizen	3 - 1	Chan Siu Ki 2', Tales Schutz 61', Maxwell 83'	Mong Kok Stadium	2,374	HKFA.com
7 December 2008	Semi Final	TSW Pegasus	0 - 2		Mong Kok Stadium	4,167	HKFA.com

== League Cup ==
Date	Round	Opponents	Result	Scorers	Venue	Attendance	Reports
7 March 2009	Quarter Final	TSW Pegasus	1 - 2	Au Yeung Yiu Chung 19'	Mong Kok Stadium	2,421	HKFA.com

== HKFA Sheffield United FA Cup ==
Date	Round	Opponents	Result	Scorers	Venue	Attendance	Reports
14 May 2009	First Round	Xiangxue Eisiti	7 - 0	Kwok Kin Pong 7', 17'; Chan Siu Ki 20', 49'; Detinho 27', 42', 86'	Mong Kok Stadium	1,143	HKFA.com
26 May 2009 *	Quarter Final	Happy Valley	1 - 1; 3 - 1 (ext)	Au Yeung Yiu Chung 81'; Chan Siu Ki 99', 115'	Mong Kok Stadium	1,304	HKFA.com
30 May 2009	Semi Final	TSW Pegasus	2 - 3	Chan Siu Ki 24', 81' (pen.)	Mong Kok Stadium	2,490	HKFA.com

Note * : The match was postponed from 24 May due to weather condition.

== AFC Cup ==
Date	Round	Opponents	Result	Scorers	Venue	Attendance	Reports
10 March 2009	Group Stage	(Indonesia) PSMS Medan	3 - 0	Li Haiqiang 22'; Chan Siu Ki 45'; Cacá 58'	Mong Kok Stadium	3,207	AFC HKFA
17 March 2009	Group Stage	(Maldives) VB Sports Club	2 - 1	Tales Schütz 49', 90'	National Stadium, Malé	7,000	AFC
7 April 2009	Group Stage	(Malaysia) Johor FC	2 - 0	Man Pei Tak 15'; Cacá 55'	Mong Kok Stadium	3,791	AFC HKFA
21 April 2009	Group Stage	(Malaysia) Johor FC	4 - 1	Cacá 29', 90'; Tales Schütz 47'; Chan Chi Hong 66'	Pasir Gudang Corporation Stadium	500	AFC
5 May 2009	Group Stage	(Indonesia) PSMS Medan	2 - 2	Cacá 48', 71'	Si Jalak Harupat Stadium	300	AFC
19 May 2009	Group Stage	(Maldives) VB Sports Club	2 - 1	Chan Siu Ki 4'; Wong Chin Hung 58'	Mong Kok Stadium	1,071	AFC HKFA
23 June 2009	Round of 16	(Singapore) Home United	4 - 0	Kwok Kin Pong 19'; Li Haiqiang 21', 64' (pen.); Cacá 51'	Hong Kong Stadium	8,972	AFC HKFA

== Squad statistics ==
No.	Pos.	Name	League		Senior Shield		League Cup		FA Cup		AFC Cup		Total		Discipline	
No.	Pos.	Name	Apps	Goals	Apps	Goals	Apps	Goals	Apps	Goals	Apps^{11}	Goals^{11}	Apps	Goals	Yellow card	Red card
1	GK	(China) Li Weijun^{4}	3 (1)	0	0	0	0	0	0	0	NA	NA	3 (1)	0	0	0
2	DF	(Hong Kong) Lee Chi Ho	16 (2)	0	1	0	1	0	2	0	6	0	26 (2)	0	6	2
3	DF	(Hong Kong) Poon Yiu Cheuk	18 (1)	0	2	0	0	0	1 (1)	0	5 (1)	0	26 (3)	0	5	0
4	DF	(Brazil) Sidraílson^{3}	13 (1)	0	2	0	0	0	3	0	6	0	24 (1)	0	7	0
5	MF	(China) Bai He	15 (3)	2	2	0	1	0	2	0	6 (1)	0	26 (4)	2	3	0
6	DF	(Hong Kong) Wong Chin Hung^{1}	7	1	0	0	1	0	2 (1)	0	2 (2)	1	12 (3)	2	1	0
7	FW	(Hong Kong) Chan Siu Ki	17 (5)	12	2	1	0	0	3	6	6	2	28 (5)	21	9	0
8	DF	(Hong Kong) Lee Wai Lun^{8}	7 (1)	0	0	0	0	0	2 (1)	0	6	0	15 (2)	0	4	0
9	FW	(China) Liang Zicheng^{6}	3 (2)	1	0	0	1	0	0	0	1 (1)	0	5 (3)	1	1	0
10	MF	(Hong Kong) Au Yeung Yiu Chung	12 (9)	7	2	0	1	1	3	1	2 (5)	0	20 (14)	9	3	0
11	MF	(Hong Kong) Li Haiqiang	6 (5)	3	0	0	0 (1)	0	3	0	6 (1)	3	15 (7)	6	2	0
13	MF	(Hong Kong) Chan Chi Hong	2 (3)	1	0	0	1	0	0 (1)	0	1 (4)	1	4 (8)	2	0	0
14	DF	(China) Liu Songwei^{9}	0 (1)	0	0	0	0	0	0	0	NA	NA	0 (1)	0	0	0
15	DF	(Hong Kong) Chan Wai Ho	12 (4)	2	0	0	0	0	2	0	2 (1)	0	16 (5)	2	1	0
16	GK	(China) Zhang Jianzhong	1	0	0	0	0	0	0	0	0	0	1	0	0	0
17	GK	(Hong Kong) Ho Kwok Chuen^{2}	8	0	1	0	0	0	0	0	0	0	9	0	0	0
18	MF	(Hong Kong) Kwok Kin Pong	5 (3)	1	0 (2)	0	0	0	1 (1)	2	2 (1)	1	8 (7)	4	1	0
19	MF	(Brazil) Monteiro^{4}	10	1	0	0	0	0	0	0	NA	NA	10	1	1	0
19	MF	(Hong Kong) Leung Hinson^{10}	0	0	0	0	0	0	0	0	0 (1)	0	0 (1)	0	0	0
20	DF	(Hong Kong) Lo Chun Kit	4 (4)	0	1 (1)	0	0	0	0	0	1 (1)	0	6 (6)	0	2	1
21	MF	(Hong Kong) Man Pei Tak	14 (5)	2	2	0	0 (1)	0	0 (2)	0	6	1	22 (8)	3	7	0
22	FW	(South Korea) Kim Yeon-Gun^{5}	6 (2)	1	0	0	1	0	0	0	NA	NA	7 (2)	1	0	0
23	GK	(Hong Kong) Zhang Chunhui	11	0	0	0	1	0	3	0	7	0	22	0	2	0
25	DF	(Togo) Cris	20 (1)	2	2	0	1	0	1	0	NA	NA	24 (1)	2	5	0
26	FW	(Brazil) Cacá^{7}	7 (1)	6	0	0	0 (1)	0	0 (2)	0	6	7	13 (4)	13	6	1
27	FW	(Brazil) Maxwell^{4}	11 (1)	5	2	1	0	0	0	0	NA	NA	13 (1)	6	5	0
27	MF	(Brazil) Fernando^{7}	1	0	0	0	1	0	0	0	NA	NA	2	0	1	0
28	FW	(Brazil) Tales Schütz	16 (4)	6	0 (2)	1	0	0	2	0	6	3	24 (6)	8	13	0
29	MF	(China) Fan Weijun	3 (4)	0	0 (1)	0	0	0	0	0	0 (1)	0	3 (6)	0	0	0
30	FW	(Brazil) Detinho	15 (7)	18	2	0	1	0	3	3	NA	NA	21 (7)	21	5	1

Statistics accurate as of match played on 23 June 2009
1. Wong Chin Hung was on loan at TSW Pegasus from 23 September 2008 to 15 January 2009.
2. Ho Kwok Chuen joined the team on loan from TSW Pegasus since 23 September 2008.
3. Sidraílson rejoined the team in September 2008.
4. Li Weijun, Monteiro and Maxwell left the club in early January 2009.
5. Kim Yeon-Gun joined the team in January 2009.
6. Li Zicheng was not registered for this season until January 2009.
7. Cacá and Fernando joined the club on 23 January 2009.
8. Lee Wai Lun joined the club on 24 January 2009.
9. Liu Songwei joined the club in February 2009.
10. Leung Hinson was promoted from youth team in February 2009.
11. Players not registered in the AFC Cup are indicated by NA.
