= 2009–10 South China AA season =

South China
2009–10 season
- Chairman: Steven Lo (Football Management Committee)
- Manager: Kim Pan-Gon
Home colours	Away colours	Third colours

== Events ==
- On 23 June 2009, South China Brazilian striker Cacá announced the decision of not renew the contract as he needs to return to his pregnant wife in Brazil after winning 4–0 against Singapore team Home United in the Round of 16 at AFC Cup 2009 knockout stage.
- On 29 June 2009, Happy Valley agrees the transfer of Hong Kong national trio Gerard, Leung Chun Pong and Chao Pengfei to South China.
- On 2 July, South China announced Brazilian defender Sidraílson will not renew contract as he got attention from clubs in Middle East.
- On 6 July, South China manager Steven Lo announced on 6 July 2009 that União de Leiria Brazilian defender Luiz Carlos has joined South China AA for the 2009/10 Hong Kong First Division League and AFC Cup 2009 season.
- South China were knocked out in the semifinals of the AFC Cup by eventual champions Kuwait SC.

=== Current squad ===
As of 28 August 2009.

Note: Flags indicate national team as defined under FIFA eligibility rules; some limited exceptions apply. Players may hold more than one non-FIFA nationality.

No.	Pos.	Nation	Player
2	DF	HKG	Lee Chi Ho
3	DF	HKG	Poon Yiu Cheuk
4	DF	BRA	Sidraílson
5	MF	HKG	Bai He
6	DF	HKG	Wong Chin Hung
7	FW	HKG	Chan Siu Ki
8	DF	HKG	Lee Wai Lun
9	FW	HKG	Lee Wai Lim
10	MF	HKG	Au Yeung Yiu Chung
11	MF	HKG	Li Haiqiang (Captain)
13	MF	HKG	Chan Chi Hong

No.	Pos.	Nation	Player
15	DF	HKG	Chan Wai Ho
16	MF	HKG	Leung Chun Pong
17	GK	HKG	Ho Kwok Chuen
18	MF	HKG	Kwok Kin Pong
19	MF	HKG	Hinson Leung
20	FW	HKG	Chao Pengfei
21	DF	HKG	Man Pei Tak
22	DF	HKG	Gerard
23	GK	HKG	Zhang Chunhui
26	FW	BRA	Leandro Carrijo
28	FW	BRA	Tales Schütz

== Transfers ==
=== In ===
Pos.	Name	From	Fee
FW	(Hong Kong) Lee Wai Lim (李威廉)	(Hong Kong) NT Realty Wofoo Tai Po	Undisclosed
DF	(Hong Kong) Gerard (卓卓)	(Hong Kong) Happy Valley	
MF	(Hong Kong) Leung Chun Pong (梁振邦)	(Hong Kong) Happy Valley	
FW	(Hong Kong) Chao Pengfei (巢鵬飛)	(Hong Kong) Happy Valley	
DF	(Brazil) Luiz Carlos (卡路士)	(Portugal) União de Leiria	On Trial
MF	(Brazil) Ramón (雷文)	(Brazil) Coritiba	On Loan
FW	(Bolivia) José Castillo (卡斯迪路)	(Mexico) Tecos	On Trial
FW	(Brazil) Leandro Carrijo (卡里祖)	(Portugal) Vitória Setúbal	
DF	(Brazil) Sidraílson (沙域臣)	(Vietnam) Unknown	Free Transfer
FW	(Brazil) Leo (里奧)	(Austria) SV Grödig	
MF	(Brazil) Wellingsson (威靈臣)	(Brazil) Brasilis	

=== Out ===
Pos.	Name	To	Fee
FW	(South Korea) Kim Yeon-Gun (金永健)	(South Korea) Incheon United	Released
FW	(Brazil) Cacá (卡卡)	(Brazil) Olaria	Released
DF	(Brazil) Sidraílson (沙域臣)	(Vietnam) Unknown	Released
FW	(Brazil) Detinho (迪天奴)	(Hong Kong) Citizen	Released
DF	(Togo) (Brazil) Cris (基斯)	(Brazil) Juventus	Released
FW	(Hong Kong) Li Ling Fung (李靈峰)	(Hong Kong) TSW Pegasus	
DF	(Hong Kong) Lo Chun Kit (盧俊傑)	(Hong Kong) TSW Pegasus	
FW	(China) Liang Zicheng (梁子成)	(Hong Kong) Fourway Rangers	
MF	(China) Fan Weijun (樊偉軍)	(Hong Kong) Fourway Rangers	
DF	(China) Liu Songwei (劉松偉)	(Hong Kong) Fourway Rangers	
GK	(China) Zhang Jianzhong (張健忠)	(Hong Kong) Tuen Mun Progoal	
FW	(Bolivia) José Castillo (卡斯迪路)		Unsuccessful Trial
DF	(Brazil) Luiz Carlos (卡路士)	(Iran) Paykan F.C.	Unsuccessful Trial
MF	(Brazil) Ramón (雷文)	(Brazil) Coritiba	Return From Loan
FW	(Brazil) Leandro Carrijo (卡里祖)		

== Pre-season friendlies & Warm-up Matches ==
Date	Opponents	H / A	Result	Scorers	Attendance	Report	Note
24 July 2009	(Hong Kong) NT Realty Wofoo Tai Po	N	2–0	Luiz Carlos; Chan Wai Ho	N/A	on.cc
2 August 2009	(England) Tottenham Hotspur	H	2–0	Chan Siu Ki 52'; Li Haiqiang 69'	23,025	HKFA
13 August 2009	(Hong Kong) Citizen	N	4–0	Ramón; Chan Chi Hong; Tales Schütz; José Castillo	N/A	takungpao.com

== 2009/10 Hong Kong Community Shield ==
Date	Opponents	H / A	Result	Scorers	Attendance	Report	Note
17 August 2009	(Hong Kong) Kitchee	N	0–2		4,694	HKFA

== 2009/10 HKFA bma First Division League ==
Round	Date	Opponents	H / A	Result	Scorers	Attendance	Report	Note
1	6 September 2009	Tai Chung	H	4–0	Kwok Kin Pong 18', 76'; Leandro Carrijo 43', 73'	2,230	HKFA
2	9 September 2009	Citizen	H	1–0	Tales Schütz 90'	1,636	HKFA
3	23 September 2009	Fourway Rangers	H	1–0	Leandro Carrijo 45'	933	HKFA
4	11 October 2009	TSW Pegasus	A					Postponed
5	18 October 2009	Shatin	H					Postponed
6	31 October 2009	Kitchee	A	1–2	Leandro Carrijo 73' (PEN)	5,442	HKFA
8	22 November 2009	Sun Hei	A	1–3	Chan Siu Ki 50' (PEN)	944	HKFA
7	28 November 2009	Tuen Mun Progoal	A					Cancelled
5	15 December 2009	Shatin	H	6–0	Schutz 6', Chan Siu Ki 43', 57', 86', Kwok Kin Pong 78', 90+1'	524	HKFA	New Schedule
4	3 January 2010	TSW Pegasus	A	2–2	Chan Siu Ki 13', Bai He 22'	3,953	HKFA	New Schedule
9	16 January 2010	NT Realty Wofoo Tai Po	H	1–0	Leo 56'	1,847	HKFA
11	24 January 2010	Happy Valley	A	6–2	Leo 3', Schutz 34', Chan Siu Ki 44', 66', 80', 90+1'	746	HKFA
14	2 February 2010	Sun Hei	H	3–2	Leo 25', Chan Siu Ki 26', 78' (PEN)	1,557	HKFA
12	20 February 2010	Citizen	A
13	13 March 2010	Fourway Rangers	A
18	28 March 2010	TSW Pegasus	H
17	11 April 2010	NT Realty Wofoo Tai Po	A
19	2 May 2010	Shatin	A
20	7 May 2010	Tai Chung	A
15	21 May 2010	Kitchee	H
16	25 May 2010	Happy Valley	H

== 2009/10 HKFA Canbo Senior Shield ==
Round	Date	Opponents	H / A	Result	Scorers	Attendance	Report	Note
Quarter Final	25 December 2009	Tai Chung	N	3–0	Lee Wai Lim 67', Chan Siu Ki 84', 86'	2,537	HKFA
Semi Final	10 January 2010	Sun Hei	N	2–0	Chan Siu Ki 26', Schutz 82'	3,526	HKFA
Final	30 January 2010	Kitchee	N	4–2	Schutz 68', Leo 69', 90+1', Chan Siu Ki 79'	2,760	HKFA

== AFC Cup ==
=== AFC Cup 2009 ===
Round	Date	Opponents	H / A	Result	Scorers	Attendance	Report	Note
Quarter Final Leg 1	15 September 2009	(Uzbekistan) Neftchi Farg'ona	A	4–5	Gerard 33'; Ramón 35'; Kwok Kin Pong 41'; Leandro Carrijo 84' (PEN)	13,800	AFC
Quarter Final Leg 2	30 September 2009	(Uzbekistan) Neftchi Farg'ona	H	1–0	Leandro Carrijo 2'	20,112	AFC
Semi Final Leg 1	15 October 2009	Al-Kuwait	A	1–2	Gerard 90+2'	2,000	AFC
Semi Final Leg 2	21 October 2009	Al-Kuwait	H	0–1		37,459	AFC

== Squad statistics ==
Statistics accurate as of match played on 21 October 2009

No.	Pos.	Name	League		Senior Shield		League Cup		FA Cup		AFC Cup 2009; 2010		Total		Discipline	
No.	Pos.	Name	Apps	Goals	Apps	Goals	Apps	Goals	Apps	Goals	Apps	Goals	Apps	Goals	Yellow card	Red card
2	DF	(Hong Kong) Lee Chi Ho	2 (0)	0	0 (0)	0	0 (0)	0	0 (0)	0	3 (0)	0	5 (0)	0	2	0
3	DF	(Hong Kong) Poon Yiu Cheuk	3 (1)	0	0 (0)	0	0 (0)	0	0 (0)	0	3 (0)	0	6 (1)	0	2	0
4	DF	(Brazil) Sidraílson	0 (0)	0	0 (0)	0	0 (0)	0	0 (0)	0	N/A	N/A	0 (0)	0	0	0
5	MF	(Hong Kong) Bai He	0 (1)	0	0 (0)	0	0 (0)	0	0 (0)	0	1 (1)	0	1 (2)	0	0	0
6	DF	(Hong Kong) Wong Chin Hung	1 (0)	0	0 (0)	0	0 (0)	0	0 (0)	0	1 (0)	0	2 (0)	0	0	0
7	FW	(Hong Kong) Chan Siu Ki	0 (3)	0	0 (0)	0	0 (0)	0	0 (0)	0	1 (1)	0	1 (4)	0	0	1
8	DF	(Hong Kong) Lee Wai Lun	3 (0)	0	0 (0)	0	0 (0)	0	0 (0)	0	2 (2)	0	5 (2)	0	1	0
9	FW	(Hong Kong) Lee Wai Lim	3 (0)	0	0 (0)	0	0 (0)	0	0 (0)	0	0 (3)	0	3 (3)	0	1	0
10	MF	(Hong Kong) Au Yeung Yiu Chung	1 (0)	0	0 (0)	0	0 (0)	0	0 (0)	0	0 (1)	0	1 (1)	0	0	0
11	MF	(Hong Kong) Li Haiqiang	2 (1)	0	0 (0)	0	0 (0)	0	0 (0)	0	3 (0)	0	5 (1)	0	0	0
13	MF	(Hong Kong) Chan Chi Hong	0 (0)	0	0 (0)	0	0 (0)	0	0 (0)	0	0 (0)	0	0 (0)	0	0	0
15	DF	(Hong Kong) Chan Wai Ho	4 (0)	0	0 (0)	0	0 (0)	0	0 (0)	0	4 (0)	0	8 (0)	0	1	0
16	MF	(Hong Kong) Leung Chun Pong	1 (0)	0	0 (0)	0	0 (0)	0	0 (0)	0	1 (1)	0	2 (1)	0	0	0
17	GK	(Hong Kong) Ho Kwok Chuen	2 (0)	0	0 (0)	0	0 (0)	0	0 (0)	0	1 (0)	0	3 (0)	0	0	0
18	MF	(Hong Kong) Kwok Kin Pong	4 (0)	2	0 (0)	0	0 (0)	0	0 (0)	0	4 (0)	1	8 (0)	3	1	0
19	MF	(Hong Kong) Leung Hinson	0 (0)	0	0 (0)	0	0 (0)	0	0 (0)	0	0 (0)	0	0 (0)	0	0	0
20	FW	(Hong Kong) Chao Pengfei	0 (3)	0	0 (0)	0	0 (0)	0	0 (0)	0	0 (2)	0	0 (5)	0	0	0
21	MF	(Hong Kong) Man Pei Tak	3 (1)	0	0 (0)	0	0 (0)	0	0 (0)	0	4 (0)	0	7 (1)	0	5	0
22	DF	(Hong Kong) Gerard	4 (0)	0	0 (0)	0	0 (0)	0	0 (0)	0	4 (0)	2	8 (0)	2	2	0
23	GK	(Hong Kong) Zhang Chunhui	2 (0)	0	0 (0)	0	0 (0)	0	0 (0)	0	3 (0)	0	5 (0)	0	0	0
26	FW	(Brazil) Leandro Carrijo	4 (0)	4	0 (0)	0	0 (0)	0	0 (0)	0	4 (0)	2	8 (0)	6	3	0
28	FW	(Brazil) Tales Schütz	1 (1)	1	0 (0)	0	0 (0)	0	0 (0)	0	1 (0)	0	2 (1)	1	0	0
30	MF	(Brazil) Ramón	4 (0)	0	0 (0)	0	0 (0)	0	0 (0)	0	4 (0)	1	8 (0)	1	1	0
