= 2009 Lunar New Year Cup =

The 2009 Lunar New Year Cup is a football tournament held in Hong Kong on the first and fourth day of the Chinese New Year of the Earth Ox Year (9 February and 12 February 2009).

== Format ==
The two semi-finals for the four participating teams will be held on the first day of the Chinese New Year of Ox (26 January 2009). The winning teams will enter the final and the losing teams play the third-place playoff (Both matches on the fourth day of the Lunar New Year, i.e. 29 January.) Draw in the semi-finals and third-place playoff would be settled by penalty shootout directly, that means no extra time would be played. For the final, a thirty-minute extra time would be played after a draw. A further draw would lead to the penalty shootout.

== Participating teams ==
- Hong Kong League Selection (host)
- (Hong Kong) South China Pegasus Team
- (Czech Republic) Sparta Prague
- (South Korea) Suwon Samsung Bluewings

== Squads ==
=== Hong Kong League Selection ===
- Team Managers: (Hong Kong) Leung Hung Tak, (Hong Kong) Pui Kwan Kay, (Hong Kong) Ken Ng
- Coaches: (Chile) Julio Moreno (Kitchee), (Hong Kong) Chan Ho Yin (NT Realty Wofoo Tai Po)
- Physical coach: (France) Vianney Selin (Kitchee)
- Physio: (Hong Kong) So Chun Lung

No.	Pos.	Player	Date of birth (age)	Caps	Club
1	GK	(China) Wei Zhao	9 August 1983 (aged 25)		(Hong Kong) Convoy Sun Hei
33	GK	(Brazil) Luciano	10 April 1974 (aged 34)		(Hong Kong) Kitchee
2	DF	(Brazil) Machado	24 December 1978 (aged 30)		(Hong Kong) Eastern
3	DF	(Canada) Landon Ling	8 October 1987 (aged 21)		(Hong Kong) Kitchee
6	DF	(Brazil) Joel	24 July 1980 (aged 28)		(Hong Kong) NT Realty Wofoo Tai Po
7	DF	(Nigeria) Festus Baise	11 April 1980 (aged 28)		(Hong Kong) Citizen
16	DF	(Hong Kong) Chak Ting Fung	27 November 1989 (aged 19)		(Hong Kong) Fourway
21	DF	(Uruguay) David Díaz	4 September 1982 (aged 26)		(Hong Kong) Kitchee
23	DF	(Brazil) Hélio	31 January 1986 (aged 22)		(Hong Kong) Citizen
5	MF	(Brazil) Júnior (c)	30 March 1974 (aged 34)		(Hong Kong) NT Realty Wofoo Tai Po
8	MF	(Chile) Gustavo Zamudio	11 April 1985 (aged 21)		(Hong Kong) Kitchee
10	MF	(Republic of the Congo) Edson Minga	31 May 1979 (aged 29)		(Hong Kong) Fourway
13	MF	(Hong Kong) Chan Man Fai	19 June 1988 (aged 20)		(Hong Kong) Kitchee
14	MF	(Uruguay) Luis Cupla			(Hong Kong) Kitchee
19	MF	(Brazil) Paulinho	16 January 1983 (aged 26)		(Hong Kong) Citizen
20	MF	(Hong Kong) Tam Lok Hin	1 December 1991 (aged 17)		(Hong Kong) Eastern
28	MF	(Hong Kong) Ip Chung Long	16 November 1989 (aged 19)		(Hong Kong) Kitchee
32	MF	(China) Chen Zhizhao	14 March 1988 (aged 20)		(Hong Kong) Citizen
9	FW	(Chile) Carlos Cáceres	28 April 1977 (aged 29)		(Hong Kong) Kitchee
11	FW	(Brazil) Sandro	10 March 1987 (aged 21)		(Hong Kong) Citizen
15	FW	(Ghana) Christian Annan	3 May 1978 (aged 30)		(Hong Kong) NT Realty Wofoo Tai Po
22	FW	(Brazil) Giovane	25 November 1982 (aged 26)		(Hong Kong) Convoy Sun Hei

=== South China Pegasus Team ===
- Team Managers: (Hong Kong) Steven Lo, (Hong Kong) Wong Wai Shun
- Head coach: (South Korea) Kim Pan-Gon (South China)
- Coaches: (Hong Kong) Liu Chun Fai, (Brazil) Ricardo
- Assistant coaches: (Hong Kong) Ku Kam Fai, (Hong Kong) Leung Cheuk Cheung
- Management: (Hong Kong) Lam Kai Tai, (Hong Kong) Lo Kwun Ming, (Hong Kong) Lee Yun Wah

No.	Pos.	Player	Date of birth (age)	Caps	Club
1	GK	(Brazil) Oliveira	12 October 1975 (aged 33)		(Hong Kong) TSW Pegasus
23	GK	(Hong Kong) Li Jian	19 September 1985 (aged 23)		(Hong Kong) TSW Pegasus
2	DF	(Brazil) Beto	10 July 1984 (aged 28)		(Hong Kong) TSW Pegasus
3	DF	(Brazil) Sidraílson (c)	26 February 1982 (aged 26)		(Hong Kong) South China
4	DF	(China) Deng Jinghuang	24 January 1985 (aged 24)		(Hong Kong) TSW Pegasus
6	DF	(Hong Kong) Wong Chin Hung	2 March 1982 (aged 26)		(Hong Kong) South China
8	DF	(Ghana) Wisdom Fofo Agbo	25 June 1979 (aged 29)		(Hong Kong) TSW Pegasus
18	DF	(Hong Kong) Luk Koon Pong	1 August 1978 (aged 30)		(Hong Kong) TSW Pegasus
20	DF	(Hong Kong) Lo Chun Kit	13 November 1985 (aged 23)		(Hong Kong) South China
25	DF	(Togo) Cris	9 October 1980 (aged 28)		(Hong Kong) South China
5	MF	(China) Bai He	9 November 1982 (aged 26)		(Hong Kong) South China
9	MF	(China) Liang Zicheng	18 March 1982 (aged 26)		(Hong Kong) South China
11	MF	(Brazil) Itaparica	8 July 1980 (aged 28)		(Hong Kong) TSW Pegasus
15	MF	(Hong Kong) Yuen Kin Man	19 January 1989 (aged 20)		(Hong Kong) TSW Pegasus
16	MF	(Cameroon) Louis Berty	21 October 1981 (aged 27)		(Hong Kong) TSW Pegasus
21	MF	(Hong Kong) Man Pei Tak	16 February 1982 (aged 26)		(Hong Kong) South China
22	MF	(South Korea) Kim Yeon-Gun	12 March 1981 (aged 27)		(Hong Kong) South China
27	MF	(Brazil) Fernando	28 March 1987 (aged 21)		(Hong Kong) South China
28	MF	(Brazil) Tales Schütz	22 August 1981 (aged 27)		(Hong Kong) South China
7	FW	(Japan) Masayuki Okano	25 July 1972 (aged 36)		Unattached
26	FW	(Brazil) Cacá	19 February 1979 (aged 29)		(Hong Kong) South China
30	FW	(Brazil) Detinho	11 September 1973 (aged 35)		(Hong Kong) South China

=== Sparta Prague ===
- Head of Delegation: Jozef Chovanec
- Technical manager: David Simon
- Coaches: Martin Hašek, Jan Kmoch
- Coach Assistant: Jan Stejskal
- Doctor: Jiří Váchal
- Masseurs: Tomáš Stránský, Vít Zelenka
- Kitman: David Matěka
- Marketing Director: Michal Viktorin

No.	Pos.	Player	Date of birth (age)	Caps	Club
24	GK	(Slovakia) Matúš Kozáčik	27 December 1983 (aged 25)		(Czech Republic) Sparta Prague
29	GK	(Czech Republic) Jaromír Blažek	29 December 1972 (aged 36)		(Czech Republic) Sparta Prague
2	DF	(Czech Republic) Tomáš Řepka	2 January 1974 (aged 34)		(Czech Republic) Sparta Prague
3	DF	(Croatia) Manuel Pamić	20 August 1986 (aged 22)		(Czech Republic) Sparta Prague
6	DF	(Czech Republic) Roman Hubník	6 June 1984 (aged 24)		(Czech Republic) Sparta Prague
7	DF	(Germany) Sergio Peter	12 October 1986 (aged 22)		(Czech Republic) Sparta Prague
8	MF	(Czech Republic) Patrik Berger	10 November 1973 (aged 35)		(Czech Republic) Sparta Prague
11	MF	(Slovakia) Igor Žofčák	10 April 1983 (aged 23)		(Czech Republic) Sparta Prague
13	MF	(Czech Republic) Ondřej Kušnír	5 April 1984 (aged 24)		(Czech Republic) Sparta Prague
15	MF	(Czech Republic) Jiří Kladrubský	19 November 1985 (aged 23)		(Czech Republic) Sparta Prague
20	MF	(Slovakia) Juraj Kucka	26 February 1987 (aged 21)		(Czech Republic) Sparta Prague
22	MF	(Czech Republic) Martin Zeman	28 March 1989 (aged 19)		(Czech Republic) Sparta Prague
25	MF	(Czech Republic) Kamil Vacek	18 May 1987 (aged 21)		(Czech Republic) Sparta Prague
27	MF	(Czech Republic) Luboš Hušek	26 January 1984 (aged 25)		(Czech Republic) Sparta Prague
28	MF	(Czech Republic) Miroslav Matušovič	2 November 1980 (aged 28)		(Czech Republic) Sparta Prague
12	FW	(Ivory Coast) Bony Wilfried	10 December 1988 (aged 20)		(Czech Republic) Sparta Prague
14	FW	(Czech Republic) Václav Kadlec	20 May 1992 (aged 16)		(Czech Republic) Sparta Prague
17	FW	(Czech Republic) Jan Holenda	8 December 1985 (aged 23)		(Czech Republic) Sparta Prague
21	FW	(Czech Republic) Jiří Jeslínek	30 September 1987 (aged 21)		(Czech Republic) Sparta Prague
30	FW	(Czech Republic) Marek Kulič	11 October 1975 (aged 33)		(Czech Republic) Sparta Prague

=== Suwon Samsung Bluewings ===
- Head coach: Cha Bum-kun
- Coaches: Lee Lim-saeng, Park Kun-ha
- Goalkeeper coach: Cho Byung-deuk
- Official: Kim Jin-hoon
- Team manager: Yang Dae-hyun
- Therapist: You Hoan-mo
- Video analyst: (China) Jin Qingyi
- Interpreter: Park Sung-jin
- Kit manager: Kim Si-woong

No.	Pos.	Player	Date of birth (age)	Caps	Club
21	GK	(South Korea) Kim Dae-hwan	1 January 1976 (aged 33)		(South Korea) Suwon Bluewings
31	GK	(South Korea) Park Ho-jin	22 October 1976 (aged 32)		(South Korea) Suwon Bluewings
2	DF	(China) Li Weifeng	7 March 1978 (aged 30)		(South Korea) Suwon Bluewings
3	DF	(South Korea) Yang Sang-min	24 February 1984 (aged 24)		(South Korea) Suwon Bluewings
4	DF	(South Korea) Kim Sung-keun	20 June 1977 (aged 31)		(South Korea) Suwon Bluewings
7	DF	(South Korea) Lee Jae-seong	5 July 1988 (aged 20)		(South Korea) Suwon Bluewings
8	DF	(South Korea) Song Chong-gug	20 February 1979 (aged 29)		(South Korea) Suwon Bluewings
25	DF	(South Korea) Choi Sung-hwan	6 October 1981 (aged 27)		(South Korea) Suwon Bluewings
26	DF	(South Korea) Lee Se-in	16 June 1980 (aged 28)		(South Korea) Suwon Bluewings
29	DF	(South Korea) Kwak Hee-ju (c)	5 October 1981 (aged 27)		(South Korea) Suwon Bluewings
33	DF	(South Korea) Park Tae-min	21 January 1986 (aged 23)		(South Korea) Suwon Bluewings
5	MF	(South Korea) Park Hyunbeom	7 May 1987 (aged 21)		(South Korea) Suwon Bluewings
13	MF	(South Korea) Lee Kwan-woo	25 February 1978 (aged 30)		(South Korea) Suwon Bluewings
15	MF	(South Korea) Hong Soon-hak	19 September 1980 (aged 28)		(South Korea) Suwon Bluewings
20	MF	(South Korea) Baek Ji-hoon	28 February 1985 (aged 23)		(South Korea) Suwon Bluewings
22	MF	(South Korea) Lee Kil-hoon	6 March 1983 (aged 25)		(South Korea) Suwon Bluewings
30	MF	(South Korea) Choi Sung-hyun	2 May 1982 (aged 26)		(South Korea) Suwon Bluewings
9	FW	(Brazil) Edu	30 November 1981 (aged 27)		(South Korea) Suwon Bluewings
11	FW	(South Korea) Kim Dae-eui	30 May 1974 (aged 34)		(South Korea) Suwon Bluewings
16	FW	(South Korea) Bae Ki-jong	26 May 1983 (aged 25)		(South Korea) Suwon Bluewings
23	FW	(Brazil) Welton	6 February 1980 (aged 28)		(South Korea) Suwon Bluewings
27	FW	(South Korea) Seo Dong-hyun	5 June 1985 (aged 23)		(South Korea) Suwon Bluewings
35	FW	(South Korea) Cho Yong-tae	31 March 1986 (aged 22)		(South Korea) Suwon Bluewings

== Fixtures ==
All times given in Hong Kong Time (UTC+8).

=== Semi-finals ===
2009-02-09
15:00

Hong Kong League Selection	1–1	(Hong Kong) South China Pegasus Team
Zamudio 20'	(Report)	Cacá 46'
Penalties
Junior (penalty missed); Zamudio (penalty scored); Giovane (penalty scored); Alessandro (penalty scored); Cupla (penalty missed); Joel (penalty scored); Chen Zhizhao (penalty missed)	4–5	(penalty scored) Detinho; (penalty scored) Itaparica; (penalty missed) Schütz; (penalty scored) Cacá; (penalty missed) Beto; (penalty scored) Sidraílson; (penalty scored) Cris

Hong Kong Stadium, Hong Kong
Attendance: 8,963
Referee: Ng Kai Lam (Hong Kong)

2009-02-09
17:15

Sparta Prague (Czech Republic)	0–0	(South Korea) Suwon Bluewings
	(Report)
Penalties
Matušovič (penalty scored); Berger (penalty scored); Žofčák (penalty missed); Kucka (penalty scored); Hušek (penalty scored); Kušnír (penalty scored); Wilfried (penalty scored); Jeslínek (penalty scored); Pamić (penalty scored); Blažek (penalty scored)	9–8	(penalty scored) Edu; (penalty scored) Yang Sang-min; (penalty scored) Lee Kil-hoon; (penalty missed) Song Chong-gug; (penalty scored) Kim Dae-eui; (penalty scored) Choi Sung-hwan; (penalty scored) Baek Ji-hoon; (penalty scored) Kwak Hee-ju; (penalty scored) Seo Dong-hyun; (penalty missed) Kim Dae-hwan

Hong Kong Stadium, Hong Kong
Attendance: 8,963
Referee: Cheng Oi Cho (Hong Kong)

=== Third place match ===
2009-02-12
18:15

Hong Kong League Selection	0–0	(South Korea) Suwon Bluewings
	(Report)
Penalties
Giovane (penalty scored); Enrique Díaz (penalty scored); Cupla (penalty scored); Joel (penalty scored); Junior (penalty missed)	4–5	(penalty scored) Edu; (penalty scored) Yang Sang-min; (penalty scored) Kim Dae-eui; (penalty scored) Lee Kwan-woo; (penalty scored) Kwak Hee-ju

Hong Kong Stadium, Hong Kong
Attendance: 9,428

=== Final ===
2009-02-12
20:30

South China Pegasus Team (Hong Kong)	2–1	(Czech Republic) Sparta Prague
Schütz 33'; Kim Yeon-gun 44'	(Report)	Kušnír 90'

Hong Kong Stadium, Hong Kong
Attendance: 9,428
Referee: Ng Chiu Kok (Hong Kong)

== Bracket ==
Semi-finals
9 February 2009 – Hong Kong
Hong Kong League Selection	1 (4)
(Hong Kong) South China Pegasus Team (pen.)	1 (5)
9 February 2009 – Hong Kong
(Czech Republic) Sparta Prague (pen.)	0 (9)
(South Korea) Suwon Bluewings	0 (8)

Final
12 February 2009 – Hong Kong
(Hong Kong) South China Pegasus Team	2
(Czech Republic) Sparta Prague	1
Third place
12 February 2009 – Hong Kong
Hong Kong League Selection	0 (4)
(South Korea) Suwon Bluewings (pen.)	0 (5)

2009 Carlsberg Cup Champions
South China Pegasus Team
First Title

== Top scorers ==
1 goal

- (Hong Kong) Zamudio
- (Hong Kong) Cacá
- (Hong Kong) Tales Schütz
- (Hong Kong) Kim Yeon-gun
- (Czech Republic) Ondřej Kušnír
