= Hong Kong League XI =

Hong Kong football team

Hong Kong XI
- Association: HKFA
- Confederation: AFC (Asia)
- Home stadium: Hong Kong Stadium
First colours	Second colours

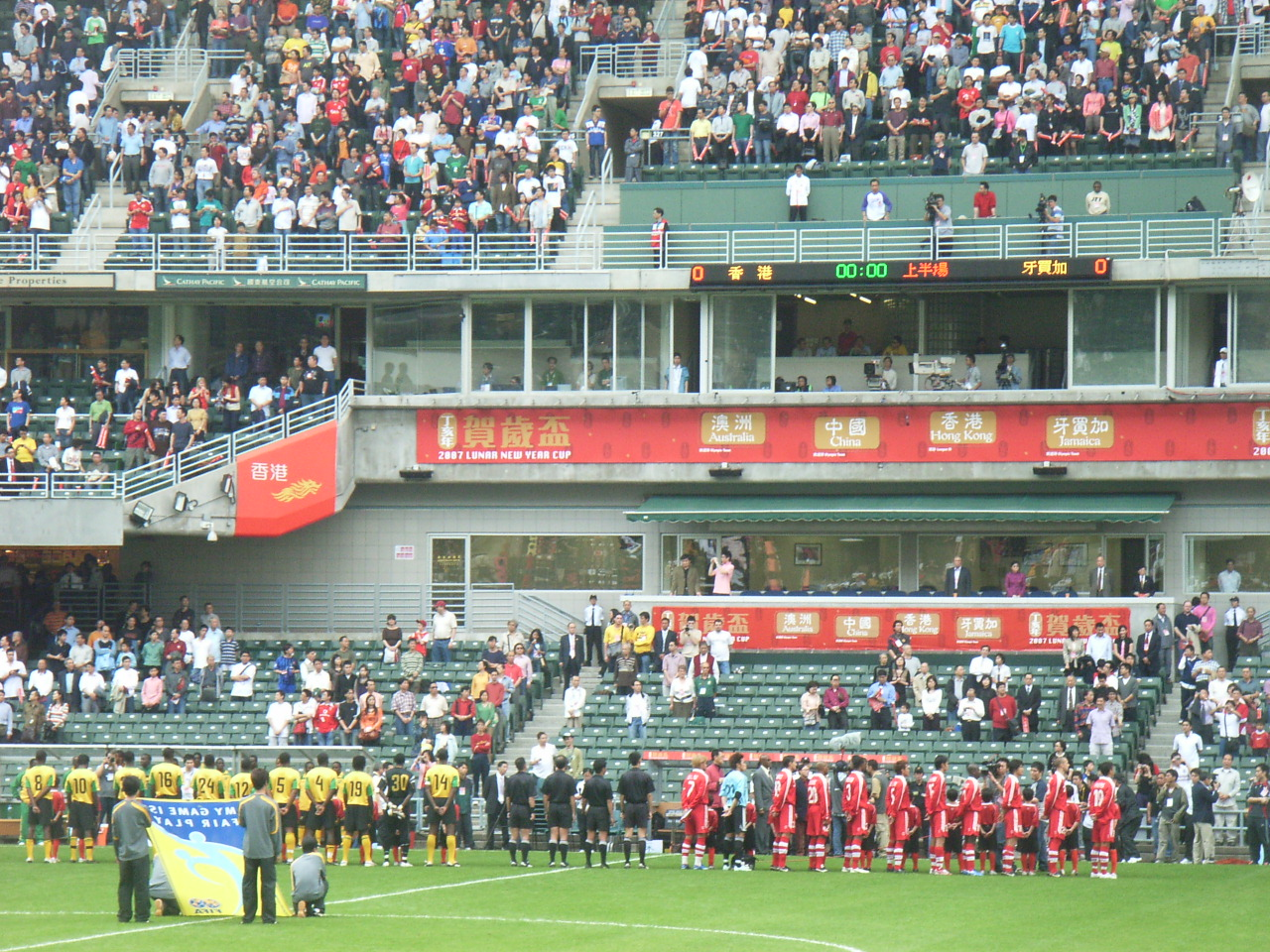
2007 Hong Kong League XI (those in red jersey)

The Hong Kong League XI, also known as the Hong Kong XI or Hong Kong League Selection, is a football team which represents the Hong Kong First Division League in exhibition matches, mainly the Lunar New Year Cup.

The team is selected from the top players in the Hong Kong First Division League. Both Hong Kong and foreign players, including those from mainland China, can be included in the team.

In recent years, to order to enable local footballers to gain more international experience, the Hong Kong Football Association has fielded the Hong Kong national football team in matches which were previously played by the Hong Kong League XI. Therefore, the League XI has not formed a squad for a few years. However, the team returned and competed in the 2007 Lunar New Year Cup.

== Historical matches ==
=== 1957 ===
31 August 1957 Merdeka Tournament; 1st Round	Hong Kong League XI	6–2	Cambodia	Kuala Lumpur, Malaya

2 September 1957 Merdeka Tournament; 2nd Round	Indonesia	1–2	Hong Kong League XI	Shah Alam, Malaya

4 September 1957 Merdeka Tournament; 2nd Round	Malaya	3–3	Hong Kong League XI	Shah Alam, Malaya

7 September 1957 Merdeka Tournament; 2nd Round	South Vietnam	1–3	Hong Kong League XI	Shah Alam, Malaya

=== 1958 ===
31 August 1958 Merdeka Tournament	South Vietnam	3–5	Hong Kong League XI	Kuala Lumpur, Malaya

1 September 1958 Merdeka Tournament	Malaya	3–0	Hong Kong League XI	Kuala Lumpur, Malaya

3 September 1958 Merdeka Tournament	Singapore	0–2	Hong Kong League XI	Kuala Lumpur, Malaya

4 September 1958 Merdeka Tournament	Indonesia	1–2	Hong Kong League XI	Kuala Lumpur, Malaya

=== 1959 ===
31 August 1959 Merdeka Tournament; 1st Round	Japan	1–1	Hong Kong League XI	Kuala Lumpur, Malaya

2 September 1959 Merdeka Tournament; 1st Round Replay	Japan	2–4	Hong Kong League XI	Kuala Lumpur, Malaya

3 September 1959 Merdeka Tournament; 2nd Round	India	2–0	Hong Kong League XI	Kuala Lumpur, Malaya

5 September 1959 Merdeka Tournament; 2nd Round	South Vietnam	4–1	Hong Kong League XI	Kuala Lumpur, Malaya

6 September 1959 Merdeka Tournament; 2nd Round	Malaya	2–1	Hong Kong League XI	Kuala Lumpur, Malaya

== 1960 ==
6 August 1960 Merdeka Tournament; Group A	South Vietnam	1–3	Hong Kong League XI	Kuala Lumpur, Malaysia

8 August 1960 Merdeka Tournament; Group A	South Korea	3–1	Hong Kong League XI	Kuala Lumpur, Malaya

11 August 1960 Merdeka Tournament; Group A	Indonesia	3–1	Hong Kong League XI	Kuala Lumpur, Malaya

13 August 1960 Merdeka Tournament; Group A	Singapore	2–3	Hong Kong League XI	Kuala Lumpur, Malaya

== 1961 ==
4 August 1961 Merdeka Tournament; Group B	Indonesia	2–2	Hong Kong League XI	Kuala Lumpur, Malaya

6 August 1961 Merdeka Tournament; Group B	Thailand	1–2	Hong Kong League XI	Kuala Lumpur, Malaya

10 August 1961 Merdeka Tournament; Group B	Singapore	4–3	Hong Kong League XI	Kuala Lumpur, Malaya

== Recent Matches ==
Date	Type of match	Location	Head coach	Opponent	Result
20 May 2002	HKSAR Reunification Cup	Hong Kong		Turkey	0–2
23 May 2002	HKSAR Reunification Cup	Hong Kong		Scotland	0–4
22 January 2004	2004 Carlsberg Cup	Hong Kong	(Hong Kong) Lai Sun Cheung	Hong Kong	0–1
25 January 2004	2004 Carlsberg Cup	Hong Kong	(Hong Kong) Lai Sun Cheung	Sweden	0–3
18 February 2007	2007 Lunar New Year Cup	Hong Kong	(Brazil) Casemiro Mior	Jamaica U-23	1–1 (3–5 PSO)
21 February 2007	2007 Lunar New Year Cup	Hong Kong	(Brazil) Casemiro Mior	Australia U-23	2–2 (3–5 PSO)
30 December 2007	2008 Guangdong–Hong Kong Cup	Hong Kong	(Portugal) José Luís	(China) Guangdong	3–0
6 January 2008	2008 Guangdong–Hong Kong Cup	Foshan, China	(Portugal) José Luís	(China) Guangdong	1–0
7 February 2008	2008 Lunar New Year Cup	Hong Kong	(Portugal) José Luís	(Uruguay) Peñarol	2–1
10 February 2008	2008 Lunar New Year Cup	Hong Kong	(Portugal) José Luís	(Croatia) Hajduk Split	2–1
26 January 2009	2009 Lunar New Year Cup	Hong Kong	(Chile) Julio César Moreno, (Hong Kong) Chan Ho Yin	(Hong Kong) South China Pegasus Team	1–1 (4–5 PSO)
29 January 2009	2009 Lunar New Year Cup	Hong Kong	(Chile) Julio César Moreno, (Hong Kong) Chan Ho Yin	(South Korea) Suwon Bluewings	0–0 (4–5 PSO)
18 July 2010	Xtep Cup	Hong Kong	(Hong Kong) Tsang Wai Chung	(England) Birmingham City F.C.	2–3
9 February 2016	2016 Lunar New Year Cup	Hong Kong	(Brazil) José Ricardo Rambo	Hong Kong	4–0
4 February 2024	Tatler XFEST	Hong Kong	(Norway) Jørn Andersen	(United States) Inter Miami CF	1–4

== Players ==
=== Most recent squad ===
The final 25-man squad against Inter Miami CF on 4 February 2024.

- Head coach: Jørn Andersen

No.	Pos.	Player	Date of birth (age)	Club
1	GK	(Hong Kong) Yapp Hung Fai	21 March 1990 (age 36)	(Football Association of Hong Kong, China) Eastern
18	GK	(Hong Kong) Pong Cheuk Hei	31 January 2004 (age 22)	(Football Association of Hong Kong, China) Resources Capital
19	GK	(Hong Kong) Tse Ka Wing	4 September 1999 (age 27)	(Football Association of Hong Kong, China) Tai Po
2	DF	(Scotland) Calum Hall	3 August 2000 (age 26)	(Football Association of Hong Kong, China) Eastern
3	DF	(Hong Kong) Li Ngai Hoi	15 October 1994 (age 32)	(Football Association of Hong Kong, China) Lee Man
5	DF	(Spain) Daniel Almazan	27 May 1999 (age 27)	(Football Association of Hong Kong, China) Eastern
15	DF	(Spain) José Ángel	2 March 1989 (age 37)	(Football Association of Hong Kong, China) Lee Man
22	DF	(Hong Kong) Timothy Chow	11 March 2006 (age 20)	(Football Association of Hong Kong, China) HKFC
26	DF	(Hong Kong) Oliver Gerbig	12 December 1998 (age 27)	(Football Association of Hong Kong, China) Kitchee
4	MF	(England) Charlie Scott	2 September 1997 (age 29)	(Football Association of Hong Kong, China) Kitchee
11	MF	(Brazil) Cleiton	9 December 1986 (age 39)	(Football Association of Hong Kong, China) Kitchee
12	MF	(Netherlands) Mitchell Paulissen	21 April 1993 (age 33)	(Football Association of Hong Kong, China) Lee Man
14	MF	(Austria) Jakob Jantscher	8 January 1989 (age 37)	(Football Association of Hong Kong, China) Kitchee
16	MF	(Hong Kong) Chan Siu Kwan	1 August 1992 (age 34)	(Football Association of Hong Kong, China) Tai Po
17	MF	(Brazil) Mikael	26 April 1993 (age 33)	(Football Association of Hong Kong, China) Kitchee
24	MF	(Hong Kong) Ngan Cheuk Pan	22 January 1998 (age 28)	(Football Association of Hong Kong, China) Sham Shui Po
27	MF	(Spain) Marcos Gondra	1 January 1987 (age 39)	(Football Association of Hong Kong, China) Eastern
7	FW	(Turkmenistan) Ruslan Mingazow	23 November 1991 (age 34)	(Football Association of Hong Kong, China) Kitchee
8	FW	(Hong Kong) Everton Camargo	25 May 1991 (age 35)	(Football Association of Hong Kong, China) Lee Man
9	FW	(Estonia) Henri Anier	17 December 1990 (age 35)	(Football Association of Hong Kong, China) Lee Man
10	FW	(Hong Kong) Lam Hok Hei	18 September 1991 (age 35)	(Football Association of Hong Kong, China) HK U23
13	FW	(Brazil) Gil	13 April 1991 (age 35)	(Football Association of Hong Kong, China) Lee Man
20	FW	(Ghana) Nassam Ibrahim	18 February 1997 (age 29)	(Football Association of Hong Kong, China) Rangers
21	FW	(Hong Kong) Jordan Lam	2 January 1999 (age 27)	(Football Association of Hong Kong, China) North District
23	FW	(Hong Kong) Mahama Awal	10 June 1991 (age 35)	(Football Association of Hong Kong, China) Southern

== Competition history ==
=== Minor tournaments ===
Minor tournaments record
Hosts / Year	Result	Position	GP	W	D*	L	GS	GA
(Federation of Malaya) 1957 Merdeka Tournament (Note: Hong Kong Football Association sent a team that consisted of players who represented Republic of China (Taiwan) and Hong Kong, as well as Western expatiates from 1957 to 1961; they did not participate in 1962; in the 1963 to 1967 editions, Republic of China (Taiwan) formally joined the tournament, despite all Republic of China international footballers being based in Hong Kong; the Hong Kong national team also joined from the 1965 edition in parallel with Republic of China national team) (Note: Mostly Eastern AA players; all ethnic Chinese, most of them capped for Republic of China (Taiwan) (9 out of 14), with the exception of Ko Po Keung and Szeto Yiu (司徒堯) who capped for Hong Kong, as well as uncapped Kwok Yau (郭有) who later capped for Republic of China (Taiwan); overlapped with the squad of Hong Kong Chinese official football team)	Winner	1	4	3	1	0	14	7
(Federation of Malaya) 1958 Merdeka Tournament (Note: Mostly KMB players, most of them capped for Republic of China (Taiwan))	Runners-up	2	4	3	0	1	9	7
(Federation of Malaya) 1959 Merdeka Tournament (Note: ethnic Chinese and Western expatriates (Watson; half of the member of Hong Kong Chinese official football team that toured in Asia in August 1959 were selected; most of them capped for Hong Kong national football team, with the exception of Lee Tak Wai (李德煒) who later capped for Republic of China (Taiwan) and Lee Kwok Wah (李國華), participant of 1958 Asian Games)	Fourth place	4	5	1	1	3	7	11
(Federation of Malaya) 1960 Merdeka Tournament (Note: Mostly Kitchee SC player; most of them capped for Hong Kong national football team, with the exception of Lee Kwok Wah and Lee Tak Wai; most Republic of China (Taiwan) internationals were drafted to 1960 Summer Olympics)	First Round	5	4	2	0	2	8	9
(Federation of Malaya) 1961 Merdeka Tournament (Note: Consist of Republic of China (such as Mok Chun Wah) and Hong Kong internationals (such as Ho Cheng Yau), overlap with the squad of Hong Kong Chinese official football team)	First Round	8	4	1	2	1	8	8
