= Chan Ho Yin =

Hong Kong footballer and coach

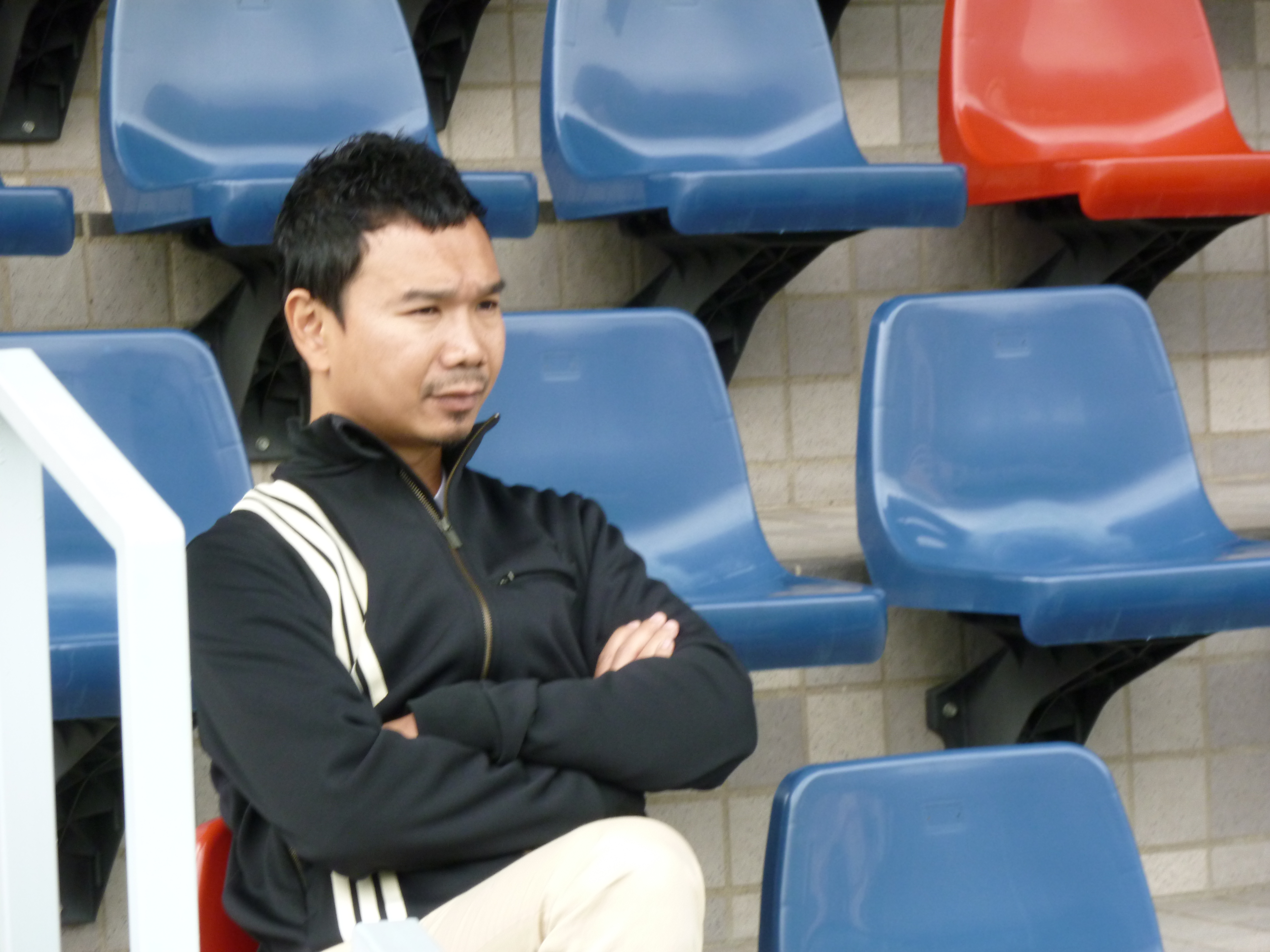

Personal information
- Full name: Chan Ho Yin
- Date of birth: 25 February 1973 (age 53)
- Place of birth: Hong Kong

Senior career*
Years	Team	Apps	(Gls)
- Kui Tan
- Kitchee

International career^{‡}
- Hong Kong U-21

Managerial career
- 2008–2009: Tai Po
- 2009: Hong Kong League XI
- 2009–2010: Tai Chung
- 2010: South China (assistant coach)
- 2010–2011: South China
- 2011–2012: South China (assistant coach)
- 2012: Pegasus
- 2012–2015: Yuen Long
- 2016–2018: Pegasus (assistant coach)
- 2018–2019: Pegasus
- 2022–2023: Eastern District (technical director)
- 2023–2024: Sham Shui Po
- * Club domestic league appearances and goals as of 26 May 2024 ‡ National team caps and goals as of 6 July 2013

Chan Ho Yin (Chinese: 陳浩然; born 25 February 1973) is a Hong Kong football coach and a former professional footballer.

== Playing career ==
Chan was a member of Hong Kong U-21 in 1990, participating in Gothia Cup and Dana Cup.

For his club career, he played for Kui Tan and Kitchee.

== Coaching career ==
After his retirement from football, he started his managerial career as an assistant coach of Hong Kong U-21.

=== Tai Po ===
In the 2008–09 season, he was appointed as the head coach of Hong Kong First Division League club Tai Po, leading the club climbing to the top of the table in October. He was also appointed as the head coach of Hong Kong League XI participating in 2009 Lunar New Year Cup.

=== Tai Chung ===
He joined another First Division club Tai Chung in July 2009. Although he helped the club avoid relegation to the Second Division, he was sacked as he breached the rule of game on 16 May 2010 against South China, which caused the club awarded a 0–3 loss. The match was originally ended with a 1–1 draw.

=== South China ===
He joined defending champions South China as an assistant coach in July 2010. Due to the resignation of head coach Kim Pan-Gon, he was appointed as the acting head coach. However, although having Nicky Butt and Mateja Kežman, South China failed to defend their league title, and were knocked out in the group stage of 2011 AFC Cup. He remained at the club as the assistant coach in the 2011–12 season.

=== Pegasus ===
Fellow First Division club Sun Pegasus appointed Chan as the head coach of the following season in June 2012. However, due to their recent poor form, Chan was sacked on 10 October.

=== Yuen Long ===
After being sacked by Sun Pegasus, Chan joined Hong Kong Second Division club Yuen Long as their head coach. He managed the club to gain promotion to the First Division as Yuen Long claimed the league title.

=== Pegasus ===
Chan returned to Pegasus, agreeing to terms on 16 January 2016 to be an assistant coach.

Following the termination of Pedro Garcia, Chan agreed to return as head coach of Pegasus on 30 September 2018.

=== Sham Shui Po ===
On 9 November 2023, Chan was appointed as the head coach of Sham Shui Po.
