= Leung Cheuk Cheung =

Hong Kong footballer (born 1965)

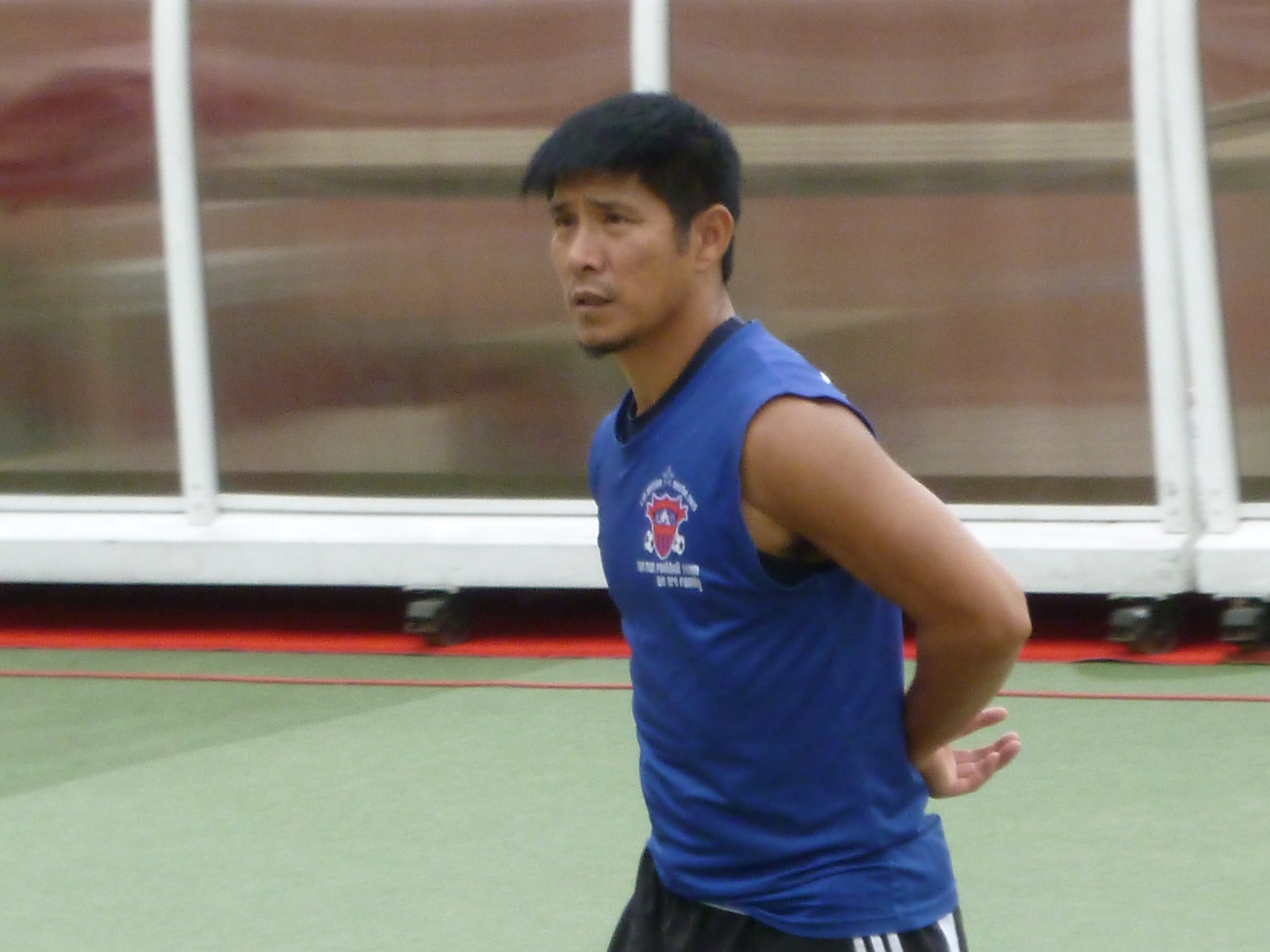

Personal information
- Full name: Leung Cheuk Cheung
- Date of birth: 22 February 1965 (age 61)
- Place of birth: Hong Kong
- Height: 1.80 m (5 ft 11 in)
- Position: Goalkeeper

Senior career*
Years	Team	Apps	(Gls)
1980–1983	Fukien		
1983–1998	South China		
- → Po Chai Pills (loan)
1998–1999	Sing Tao		
1999–2008	Happy Valley		
2008–2009	Pegasus	0	(0)

International career
2000	Hong Kong	3	(0)

Managerial career
- 2008–2012: Pegasus (assistant coach)
- 2012–2014: Tuen Mun (goalkeeper coach)
- 2019–2020: Yuen Long (goalkeeper coach)
- * Club domestic league appearances and goals

Leung Cheuk Cheung (Chinese: 梁卓長; Jyutping: loeng^{4} coek^{3} coeng^{4}; born 22 February 1965 in Hong Kong) is a Hong Kong former professional footballer who played as a goalkeeper. He is currently a football coach.

== Honours ==
Happy Valley

- Hong Kong First Division League: 2000–01, 2002–03, 2005–06
- Hong Kong Senior Shield: 2003–04
- Hong Kong League Cup: 2005–06, 2006–07
- Hong Kong FA Cup: 2003–04
- Cité de Louvre Cup: 2005–06
