= Chan Chi Hong =

Hong Kong footballer (born 1976)

Chan Chi Hong 陳志康
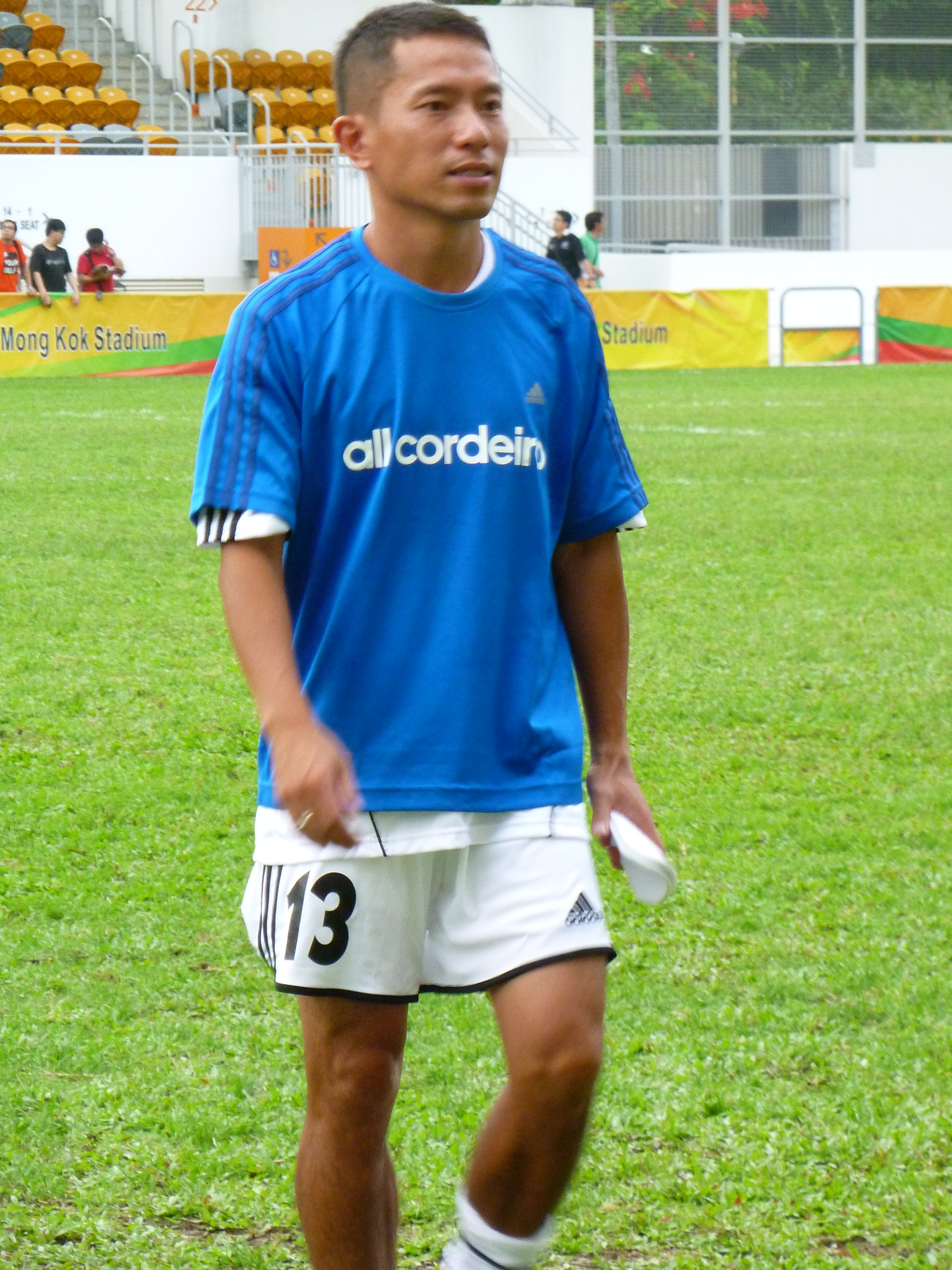
- Chan in 2012

Personal information
- Full name: Chan Chi Hong
- Date of birth: 20 October 1976 (age 50)
- Place of birth: Hong Kong
- Height: 1.66 m (5 ft 5 in)
- Positions: Left winger; attacking midfielder

Team information
- Current team: Southern (head coach)

Senior career*
Years	Team	Apps	(Gls)
1992–1993	Kui Tan		
1993–1994	Rangers (HKG)		
1994–1995	Kui Tan		
1995–2000	South China		
2000–2002	Happy Valley		
2002–2010	South China	71	(12)

International career
1999–2009	Hong Kong	17	(3)

Managerial career
- 2008–2012: South China (assistant coach)
- 2012–2014: Pegasus
- 2015: Pegasus
- 2025–2026: North District
- 2026–: Southern
- * Club domestic league appearances and goals

Chan Chi Hong (Chinese: 陳志康; Cantonese Yale: Chàn Jihōng; born 20 October 1976) is a Hong Kong football coach and a former professional footballer who played as a left winger. He is the current head coach of Hong Kong Premier League club Southern.

Chan is nicknamed Cowboy, as he was described by the fans as always moving fast and freely in the field and looking very similar to a cowboy riding on his horse.

== Managerial career ==
On 8 January 2025, Chan was appointed as the head coach of North District.

On 4 July 2026, Chan was appointed as the head coach of Southern.

== Career statistics ==
=== Club ===
As of 20 September 2008

Club	Season	League		Senior Shield		League Cup		FA Cup		AFC Cup		Total	
Club	Season	Apps	Goals	Apps	Goals	Apps	Goals	Apps	Goals	Apps	Goals	Apps	Goals
South China	2005–06	13 (0)	1	1 (0)	0	2 (0)	0	2 (0)	1	N/A	N/A	18 (0)	2
South China	2006–07	6 (3)	1	0 (2)	0	2 (1)	0	4 (0)	1	N/A	N/A	12 (6)	2
South China	2007–08	8 (2)	1	0 (1)	0	3 (2)	0	2 (0)	0	3 (0)	0	15 (5)	1
South China	2008–09	2 (3)	1	0 (0)	0	1 (0)	0	0 (1)	0	1 (4)	1	4 (8)	2
South China	2009–10	0 (0)	0	0 (0)	0	0 (0)	0	0 (0)	0	0 (0)	0	0 (0)	0
South China	All	? (?)	?	? (?)	?	? (?)	?	? (?)	?	3 (0)	0	? (?)	?

=== International ===
As of 25 August 2009

#	Date	Venue	Opponent	Result	Scored	Competition
1	18 October 1999	Mong Kok Stadium, Hong Kong	Cambodia	4–1	0	2000 AFC Asian Cup qualification
2	24 October 1999	Mong Kok Stadium, Hong Kong	Indonesia	1–1	0	2000 AFC Asian Cup qualification
3	25 April 2000	Hong Kong Stadium, Hong Kong	China	0–1	0	Friendly
4	8 October 2000	Hong Kong	Singapore	1–0	0	Friendly
5	10 December 2000	Hong Kong Stadium, Hong Kong	Estonia	1–2	0	Friendly
6	4 March 2001	Hong Kong Stadium, Hong Kong	Palestine	1–1	0	2002 FIFA World Cup qualification
7	8 March 2001	Hong Kong Stadium, Hong Kong	Malaysia	0–2	0	2002 FIFA World Cup qualification
8	11 March 2001	Hong Kong Stadium, Hong Kong	Qatar	0–2	0	2002 FIFA World Cup qualification
9	20 March 2001	Al Sadd Stadium, Doha, Qatar	Palestine	0–1	0	2002 FIFA World Cup qualification
10	23 March 2001	Al Sadd Stadium, Doha, Qatar	Malaysia	2–1	0	2002 FIFA World Cup qualification
11	25 March 2001	Al Sadd Stadium, Doha, Qatar	Qatar	0–3	0	2002 FIFA World Cup qualification
12	22 February 2003	Hong Kong Stadium, Hong Kong	Chinese Taipei	2–0	0	2003 EAFF Championship Preliminary
13	24 February 2003	Hong Kong Stadium, Hong Kong	Macau	3–0	0	2003 EAFF Championship Preliminary
14	2 March 2003	Hong Kong Stadium, Hong Kong	Guam	11–0	1	2003 EAFF Championship Preliminary
15	25 March 2003	Mong Kok Stadium, Hong Kong	Laos	5–1	2	2004 AFC Asian Cup preliminary
16	30 March 2003	Mong Kok Stadium, Hong Kong	Bangladesh	2–2	0	2004 AFC Asian Cup preliminary
17	23 August 2009	World Games Stadium, Kaohsiung, Taiwan	Chinese Taipei	4–0	0	2010 EAFF Championship Semi-finals
