= Hinson Leung =

Hong Kong footballer

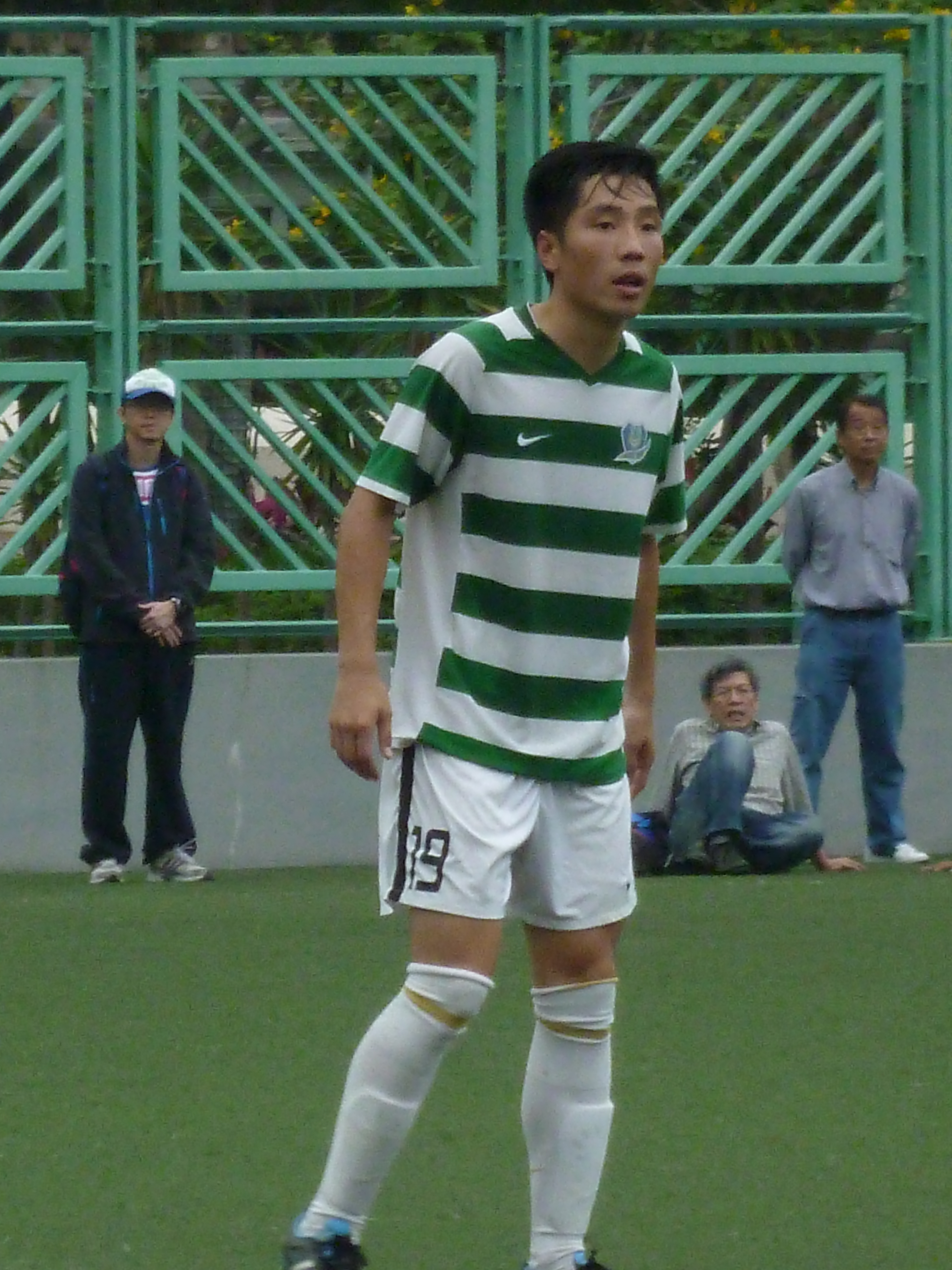

Personal information
- Full name: Hinson Leung Cheuk Hin
- Date of birth: 25 November 1987 (age 38)
- Place of birth: Hong Kong
- Height: 1.74 m (5 ft 9 in)
- Position: Attacking midfielder

Youth career
- 2006–2009: South China

Senior career*
Years	Team	Apps	(Gls)
2009–2011	South China	7	(0)
2011	→ Pegasus (loan)	2	(0)
2011–2014	Tai Chung	36	(5)

International career^{‡}
2009	Hong Kong U-23	2	(0)
2009–2010	Hong Kong	4	(0)
Medal record
Representing Hong Kong
East Asian Games
Gold medal – first place	2009 Hong Kong	Football
- * Club domestic league appearances and goals as of 16 June 2011 ‡ National team caps and goals as of 7 January 2018

Hinson Leung Cheuk Hin (Chinese: 梁倬軒; Jyutping: loeng^{4} coek^{3} hin^{1}; born 25 November 1987) is a former Hong Kong professional footballer who played as a midfielder.

== Club career ==
Leung was promoted from the youth team of South China in the 2008–09 season.

== International career ==
Leung was included in Kim Pan-Gon's squad for the 2010 East Asian Football Championship qualifiers, which began in Kaohsiung, Taiwan, on Sunday 23 August 2009, when Leung was only 21 years old and only played a top class football match once. Leung admitted he was included in the squad only because he was a South China player. "It is a great honour for me to represent Hong Kong,' he said. 'But I know this would not have happened if I was not playing for South China."

Leung was graduated from St. Joseph's College, one of the most prestigious secondary school in Hong Kong, with a tremendous result of 4A2B in The Hong Kong Certificate of Education Examination (HKCEE). He was admitted by The Bachelor of Business Administration (BBA) programme of The Chinese University of Hong Kong in 2006, and was graduated in 2010.

== Honour ==
Hong Kong

- 2009 East Asian Games Football Event: Gold

== Career statistics ==
=== Club ===
As of 16 June 2011

Club	Season	League		Senior Shield		League Cup		FA Cup		AFC Cup		Total	
Club	Season	Apps	Goals	Apps	Goals	Apps	Goals	Apps	Goals	Apps	Goals	Apps	Goals
South China	2008–09	0 (0)	0	0 (0)	0	0 (0)	0	0 (0)	0	0 (1)	0	0 (1)	0
South China	2009–10	2 (2)	0	0 (1)	0	-		1 (0)	0	0 (0)	0	3 (3)	0
South China	2010–11	0 (2)	1	0 (0)	0	1 (0)	0	0 (0)	0	0 (0)	0	1 (2)	1
TSW Pegasus	2010–11	1 (1)	0	0 (0)	0	0 (0)	0	0 (0)	0	0 (0)	0	1 (1)	0
All		3 (5)	0	0 (1)	0	1 (0)	0	1 (0)	0	0 (1)	0	5 (7)	0

=== International ===
==== Hong Kong ====
As of 7 January 2010

#	Date	Venue	Opponent	Result	Scored	Competition
1	6 January 2010	National Stadium, Madinat 'Isa, Bahrain	Bahrain	0–4	0	2011 AFC Asian Cup qualification
2	3 March 2010	Hong Kong Stadium, Hong Kong	Yemen	0–0	0	2011 AFC Asian Cup qualification
3	10 October 2010	Kaohsiung National Stadium, Kaohsiung	Macau	4–0	0	2010 Long Teng Cup
4	12 October 2010	Kaohsiung National Stadium, Kaohsiung	Chinese Taipei	1–1	0	2010 Long Teng Cup

==== Hong Kong U-23 ====
As of 10 December 2009

#	Date	Venue	Opponent	Result	Scored	Competition
1	8 December 2009	Siu Sai Wan Sports Ground, Hong Kong	China	0–1	0	2009 East Asian Games
2	10 December 2009	Hong Kong Stadium, Hong Kong	North Korea	1–1 (4–2 PSO)	0	2009 East Asian Games
