= Ramón (footballer, born 1983) =

Brazilian footballer

Personal information
- Full name: Ramón Rodrigo de Freitas
- Date of birth: 7 April 1983 (age 43)
- Place of birth: Belo Horizonte, Brazil
- Height: 1.86 m (6 ft 1 in)
- Position: Attacking midfielder

Senior career*
Years	Team	Apps	(Gls)
2002–2005	América-MG		
2003	→ Uberaba (loan)		
2004	→ URT (loan)		
2005–2007	Grêmio	23	(2)
2008	→ Portuguesa (loan)		
2008	→ Figueirense (loan)	20	(2)
2009–2010	Coritiba	12	(1)
2009	→ South China (loan)	4	(1)
2011	Botafogo (SP)	5	(1)
2011	Boa Esporte	17	(7)
2012–2015	Goiás	39	(30)
2017	Boa	9	(0)
2018	Brasiliense		
- * Club domestic league appearances and goals

Ramón Rodrigo de Freitas or simply Ramón (born 7 April 1983), is a Brazilian former football attacking midfielder.

In March 2009 he signed a two-year contract with Coritiba. On 27 July 2009, he was loaned to Hong Kong First Division League giant South China for 2009-10 season. On 4 November 2009, he was released by South China and returned to Coritiba.

== Honours ==
Grêmio

- Campeonato Gaúcho: 2006, 2008

Goiás

- Campeonato Goiano: 2012, 2013
- Campeonato Brasileiro Série B: 2012

== Career Statistics in Hong Kong ==
=== South China Athletic Association ===
As of 31 October 2009

Club	Season	League		Senior Shield		League Cup		FA Cup		AFC Cup		Total	
Club	Season	Apps	Goals	Apps	Goals	Apps	Goals	Apps	Goals	Apps	Goals	Apps	Goals
South China	2009-10	4 (0)	0	0 (0)	0	0 (0)	0	0 (0)	0	4 (0)	1	8 (0)	1
South China	All	4 (0)	0	0 (0)	0	0 (0)	0	0 (0)	0	4 (0)	1	8 (0)	1
