= Fan Weijun =

Chinese former football player

Fan Weijun 樊偉軍
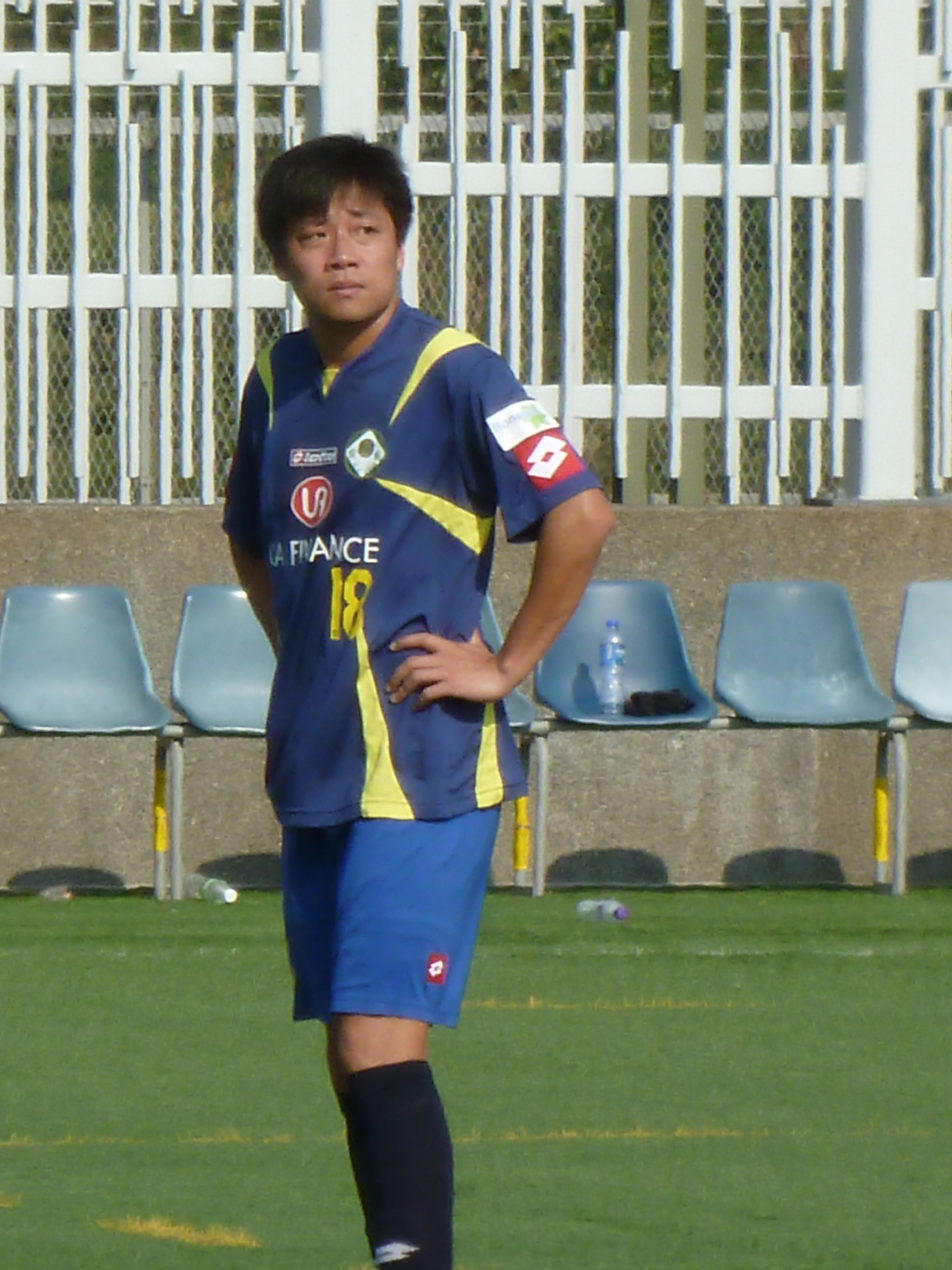

Personal information
- Full name: Fan Weijun
- Date of birth: 20 November 1978 (age 47)
- Place of birth: Shanghai, China
- Height: 1.83 m (6 ft 0 in)
- Positions: Striker; attacking midfielder; center-back

Senior career*
Years	Team	Apps	(Gls)
1995–1998	Shanghai Pudong F.C.		
1999–2002	Sichuan Quanxing		
2002–2005	Shanghai United		
2005–2007	Hong Kong Rangers	24	(5)
2007–2009	South China	18	(0)
2009–2012	Fourway Rangers	35	(3)
2012–2014	Happy Valley	6	(0)
- * Club domestic league appearances and goals as of 3 July 2014

Fan Weijun (Chinese: 樊偉軍, born 20 November 1978) is a Chinese former professional footballer. He was capable of playing at all outfield positions.

On 3 July 2014, Fan was charged with conspiracy to defraud in relation to a Senior Shield match the prior season. Later, on 24 September, he was acquitted by the Eastern Court.

== Career statistics ==
=== Club ===
Updated 14 May 2008

Club	Season	League		Senior Shield		League Cup		FA Cup		AFC Cup		Total	
Club	Season	Apps	Goals	Apps	Goals	Apps	Goals	Apps	Goals	Apps	Goals	Apps	Goals
South China	2007–08	5 (6)	0	0 (0)	0	2 (2)	1	1 (1)	0	5 (0)	0	13 (9)	1
South China	2008–09	3 (4)	0	0 (1)	0	0 (0)	0	0 (0)	0	0 (1)	0	3 (6)	0
South China	All	8 (10)	0	0 (1)	0	2 (2)	1	1 (1)	0	5 (1)	0	16 (15)	1
Fourway Rangers	2009–10	5 (0)	0	0 (0)	0	0 (0)	0	0 (0)	0	N/A	N/A	5 (0)	0
Fourway Rangers	All	5 (0)	0	0 (0)	0	0 (0)	0	0 (0)	0	N/A	N/A	5 (0)	0
