= Ho Kwok Chuen =

Hong Kong footballer (born 1977)

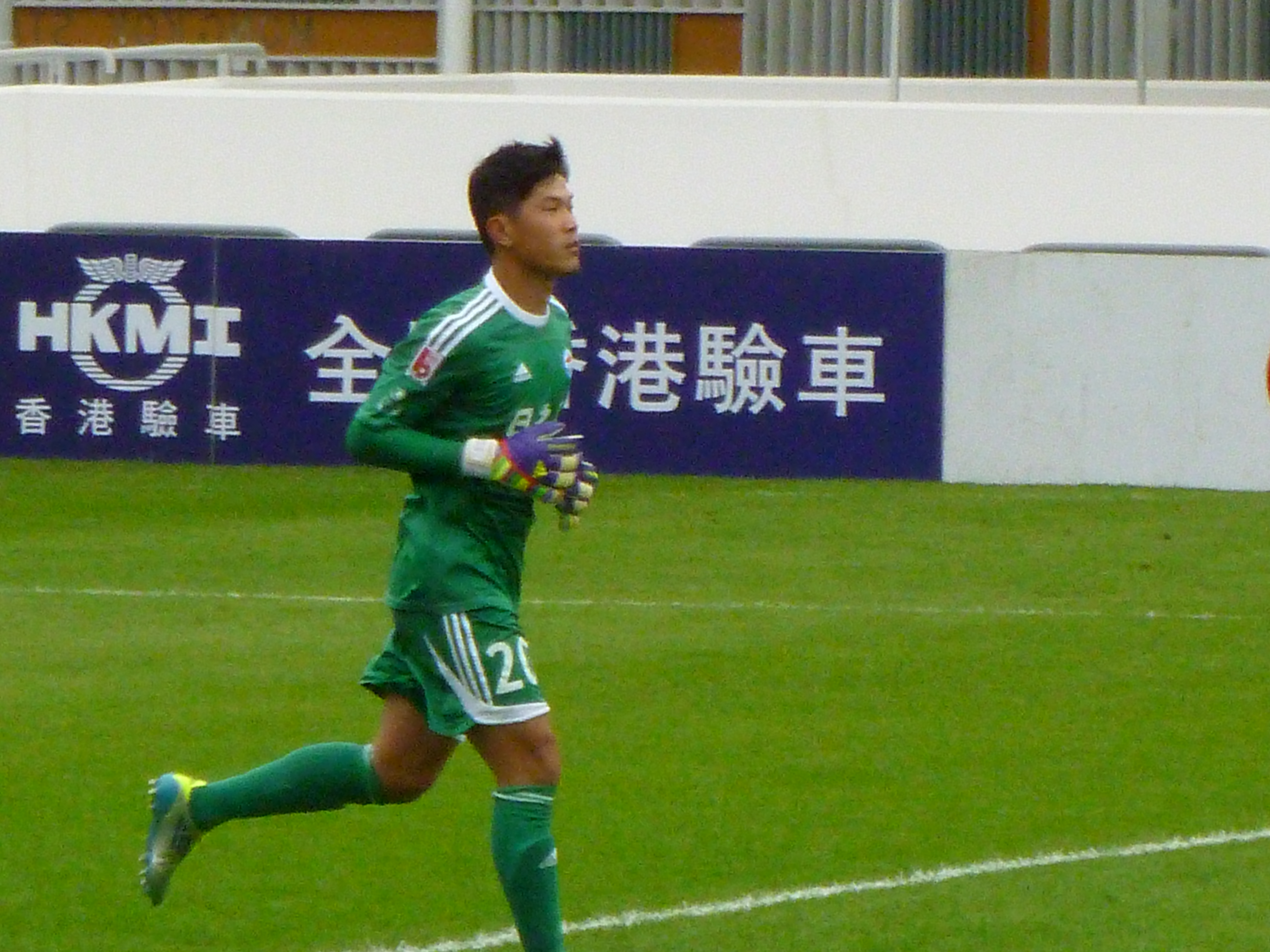

Personal information
- Full name: Ho Kwok Chuen
- Date of birth: 20 February 1977 (age 49)
- Place of birth: Hong Kong
- Height: 1.80 m (5 ft 11 in)
- Position: Goalkeeper

Team information
- Current team: North District (goalkeeping coach)

Youth career
- Instant-Dict

Senior career*
Years	Team	Apps	(Gls)
1996–2002	Sun Hei		(0)
2002–2006	South China	5	(0)
2006–2007	HKFC	13	(0)
2007–2008	Citizen	17	(0)
2008	Pegasus	1	(0)
2008–2011	South China	14	(0)
2010–2011	→ Pegasus (loan)	4	(0)
2011–2013	Sun Hei	9	(0)
2013	→ Pegasus (loan)	6	(0)
2013–2015	Pegasus	0	(0)
2015–2019	Eastern	3	(0)
2019–2023	Resources Capital	1	(0)

International career^{‡}
1999	Hong Kong U-23		
2007–2009	Hong Kong	3	(0)

Managerial career
- 2019–2023: Resources Capital (goalkeeping coach)
- 2023–: North District (goalkeeping coach)
- * Club domestic league appearances and goals as of 7 May 2023 ‡ National team caps and goals as of 17:31, 9 June 2011 (UTC)

Ho Kwok Chuen (Chinese: 何國泉; Jyutping: ho^{4} gwok^{3} cyun^{4}; born 20 February 1977) is a Hong Kong former professional footballer who played as a goalkeeper. He is currently the goalkeeping coach of Hong Kong Premier League club North District.

== Club career ==
=== Sun Hei ===
Due to a lack of players at Sun Hei in the 2011–12 Hong Kong FA Cup match against Rangers, Ho played as a midfielder. Rangers' Head coach Ricardo said he had no option left. The match ended 2–0 to Rangers.

=== Eastern ===
Having signed for Eastern in summer 2015, the 38-year-old Ho made his debut for the club later that year, on 21 October, in a group stage match of the 2015–16 Hong Kong Sapling Cup, and even though this was his first top-tier match in two years, he made several saves in a 1–1 draw with Kitchee, with the team's coach stating that "If it weren't for him, we might have lost." On 25 December 2017, in the semifinal of the Hong Kong Senior Challenge Shield against Southern District, the 40-year-old Ho came off the bench after the starting goalkeeper Yapp Hung Fai was sent off; he helped Eastern keep a clean sheet in a 1–0 victory.

=== Resources Capital ===
Having signed for Resources Capital in 2019, Ho became the eldest registered player in the 2020–21 HKPL season, aged 43.

On 7 May 2023, the 46-year-old Ho announced his retirement from professional football after playing his first league match in 5 years, which ended in a 1–0 victory over Hong Kong U23, being named Player of the Match and breaking the record for the oldest appearance in the Hong Kong Premier League. Aged 46 years and 76 days, he was the third-oldest player in the world to play a match in the top-tier of a national league, only behind fellow goalkeepers Georgi Petkov (47) and Géza Turi (49).

== Honours ==
=== Individual ===
- 2010 East Asian Football Championship Preliminary Competition: Best Goalkeeper

== Career statistics ==
=== Club ===
As of 20 September 2009

Club	Season	League		Senior Shield		League Cup		FA Cup		AFC Cup		Total	
Club	Season	Apps	Goals	Apps	Goals	Apps	Goals	Apps	Goals	Apps	Goals	Apps	Goals
South China	2008–09	8 (0)	0	1 (0)	0	0 (0)	0	0 (0)	0	0 (0)	0	9 (0)	0
South China	2009–10	2 (0)	0	0 (0)	0	0 (0)	0	0 (0)	0	1 (0)	0	3 (0)	0
South China	All	10 (0)	0	1 (0)	0	0 (0)	0	0 (0)	0	1 (0)	0	12 (0)	0

=== International ===
As of 25 August 2009

National team	Year	Apps	Goals
Hong Kong	2007	1	0
Hong Kong	2008	0	0
Hong Kong	2009	2	0
Total		3	0

#	Date	Venue	Opponent	Result	Scored	Competition
1	21 October 2007	Gianyar Stadium, Gianyar, Indonesia	Timor-Leste	3–2	0	2010 FIFA World Cup qualification
2	23 August 2009	World Games Stadium, Kaohsiung, Taiwan	Chinese Taipei	4–0	0	2010 East Asian Football Championship Semi-final
3	25 August 2009	World Games Stadium, Kaohsiung, Taiwan	North Korea	0–0	0	2010 East Asian Football Championship Semi-final
