= Cacá (footballer, born 1979) =

Brazilian footballer

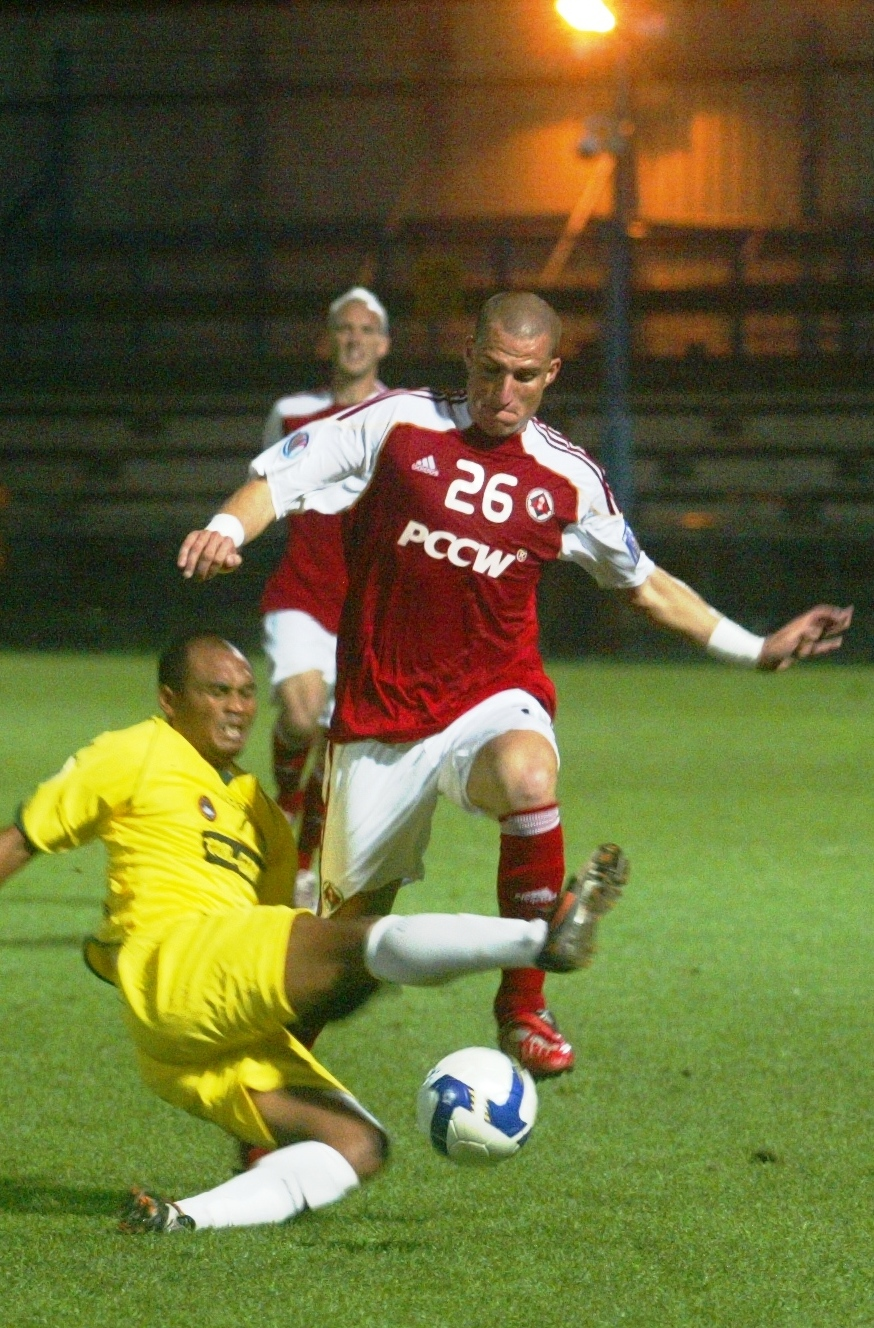
- Cacá with South China AA

Personal information
- Full name: Carlos Eduardo Ferrari
- Date of birth: 19 February 1979 (age 47)
- Place of birth: Paraná, Brazil
- Height: 1.90 m (6 ft 3 in)
- Position: Striker

Senior career*
Years	Team	Apps	(Gls)
1998–2000	Bangu		
2000–2003	Mirassol		
2000–2001	→ Rangers (loan)	0	(0)
2001–2002	→ Birmingham (loan)	4	(0)
2003	→ Salamanca (loan)	19	(6)
2003–2004	Albacete	2	(0)
2004	→ Académica (loan)	4	(0)
2004–2005	UD Las Palmas	30	(12)
2005–2006	Alicante	27	(4)
2007	Aris Thessaloniki	2	(0)
2007	Cerro Porteño	5	(1)
2008	Espérance	?	(?)
2008–2009	Universidad Las Palmas	35	(15)
2009	South China	8	(6)
2009–2010	Olaria	0	(0)
2010	Bahia	1	(0)
2010	Kalba	0	(0)
Total		137	(44)
- * Club domestic league appearances and goals

Carlos Eduardo Ferrari, sometimes known as Cacá, (born 19 February 1979) is a Brazilian former footballer.

== Career ==
=== Great Britain ===
Cacá signed a short-term deal for Scottish Premier League club Rangers in October 2000, but never appeared for the first team. His Brazilian club, Mirassol, then loaned him to English club Birmingham City for the 2001–02 season. He made four appearances in the First Division (second tier) in October and November 2001, all as a late substitute, but then faced a long-term foot injury and was released in March 2002.

=== Spain ===
Cacá signed for UD Salamanca in February 2003. He played 16 games in the Segunda División. In summer 2003, he signed for La Liga side Albacete Balompié, and then played for clubs in Segunda División B.

In December 2006, he left for Greece and was presented to media on 1 January 2007 along with Pablo Coira. He then played in Paraguay for Cerro Porteño and in Tunisia for Espérance before returning to Segunda División B with Universidad Las Palmas.

=== South China ===
He joined South China in January 2009, signed a half-season contract, and scored a hat-trick on his league debut for the team on 8 February 2009 in 8–0 win against Tuen Mun Progoal. He scored 13 goals in 17 appearances, including 7 goals in the AFC Cup group match and Round of 16. On 23 June 2009, after winning 4–0 against Singapore's side Home United in the Round of 16 at AFC Cup 2009 knockout stage, Caca announced this was his last game for South China as he needed to return to his pregnant wife in Brazil. His AFC Cup goals gave him a rank of 78th in "The World's Top Goal Scorer 2009" by the International Federation of Football History & Statistics.

=== Return to Brazil ===
In July 2009 he signed a contract until December for Olaria, which he finished as Campeonato Carioca Série B runner-up and promoted to the top division of Rio de Janeiro state. In January 2010 he signed a new contract for the club until the end of the 2010 Campeonato Carioca. Olaria finished third in Group A of the Taça Guanabara (name of the first half mini-league), and entered the play-offs "Troféu Moisés Mathias de Andrade", which decided the fifth to eighth places of the first half; eventually Olaria won, defeated América then Boavista in the final. But in Taça Rio, the second half of the state league season Olaria just finished seventh in Group A, failed to enter the play-offs.

In May 2010, he signed a contract with Bahia until the end of 2010 Campeonato Brasileiro Série B. He only played once in Série B but played 3 out of first 4 games in 2010 Campeonato do Nordeste. In August 2010 he left for Kalba in the United Arab Emirates.

== Retirement and personal life ==
In early 2011 he retired from football and work for Ronaldo. He is a friend of Ronaldo and played for "Friends of Ronaldo" against "Friends of Zidane" twice, scoring goals in the matches against poverty in 2008 and 2012.

== Career statistics ==
As of 1 January 2011

Club performance			League		Cup		League Cup		Continental		Total	
Season	Club	League	Apps	Goals	Apps	Goals	Apps	Goals	Apps	Goals	Apps	Goals
Brazil			League		Copa do Brasil		League Cup		South America		Total	
2002	Mirassol	São Paulo Série A2										
Spain			League		Copa del Rey		Supercopa de España		Europe		Total	
2002–03	Salamanca	Segunda División	19	6							19	6
2003–04	Albacete	La Liga	2	0								
Portugal			League		Taça de Portugal		Taça da Liga		Europe		Total	
2003–04	Académica	Portuguese Liga	4	0								
Spain			League		Copa del Rey		Supercopa de España		Europe		Total	
2004–05	Las Palmas	Segunda División B	30	12								
2005–06	Alicante	Segunda División B	27	4								
Greece			League		Greek Cup		League Cup		Europe		Total	
2006–07	Aris	Super League	2	0								
Paraguay			League		Cup		League Cup		South America		Total	
2007	Cerro Porteño	Primera División	5	1								
Tunisia			League		President Cup		Coupe de la Ligue		Africa		Total	
2007–08	Espérance Tunis	CLP-1							?	?		
Spain			League		Copa del Rey		Supercopa de España		Europe		Total	
2007–08	Universidad Las Palmas	Segunda División B	17	9							17	9
2008–09	Universidad Las Palmas	Segunda División B	18	6								
Hong Kong			League		FA Cup & Shield		League Cup		Asia		Total	
2008–09	South China	First Division	8	6	2	0	1	0	6	7	17	13
Brazil			League		Copa do Brasil		League Cup		South America		Total	
2009	Olaria	Rio de Janeiro Série B	—		—		—		—		23	6^{1}
2010	Olaria	Rio de Janeiro state	—		—		—		—		15	7^{2}
2010	Bahia	National Série B	1	0	—		—		—		4	0^{3}
United Arab Emirates			League		President's Cup		League Cup		Asia		Total	
2010–11	Kalba	UAE Pro-League	0	0	?	?	?	?			?	?
Total	Brazil											
Total	England		4	0	0	0	0	0			4	0
Total	Spain		113	37								
Total	Portugal		4	0							?	0
Total	Greece		2	0								
Total	Paraguay		5	1							?	1
Total	Tunisia								?	?		
Total	Hong Kong		8	6	2	0	1	0	6	7	17	13
Total	United Arab Emirates		0	0								
Career total									?	?	4	0

^{1}23 games and 6 goals in state league
^{2}14 games and 7 goals in state league
^{3}3 games in 2010 Campeonato do Nordeste.
