= Kim Yeon-gun =

South Korean footballer (born 1981)

Personal information
- Full name: Kim Yeon-gun
- Date of birth: March 12, 1981 (age 45)
- Place of birth: South Korea
- Height: 1.85 m (6 ft 1 in)
- Position: Forward

Team information
- Current team: Yongin City
- Number: 44

Youth career
- Dankook University

Senior career*
Years	Team	Apps	(Gls)
2002–2005	Jeonbuk Hyundai Motors	26	(0)
2006	Pohang Steelers	0	(0)
2007–2008	Seongnam Ilhwa Chunma	4	(0)
2009	South China	8	(1)
2009	Incheon United	0	(0)
2010–2011	Goyang KB Kookmin Bank	21	(1)
2011–2013	Yongin City	56	(10)
- * Club domestic league appearances and goals as of 8 February 2009

- Kim Yeon-gun
- Hangul: 김연건
- Hanja: 金演健
- RR: Gim Yeongeon
- MR: Kim Yŏn'gŏn

Kim Yeon-gun (born 12 March 1981) is a South Korean former professional football player. He played as a forward for Jeonbuk Hyundai Motors and Yongin City FC throughout the mid-2000s and early 2010s.

== Career in Hong Kong ==
He joined South China in January 2009 and made his league debut on 11 January 2009 against Citizen. He scored his first goal for the team in his second match on 8 February in the 8–0 match against Tuen Mun Progoal.

=== Statistics in Hong Kong ===
As of 8 February 2009

Club	Season	League		Senior Shield		League Cup		FA Cup		AFC Cup		Total	
Club	Season	Apps	Goals	Apps	Goals	Apps	Goals	Apps	Goals	Apps	Goals	Apps	Goals
South China	2008-09	6 (2)	1	0 (0)	0	1 (0)	0	0 (0)	0	0 (0)	0	7 (2)	1
South China	All	6 (2)	1	0 (0)	0	1 (0)	0	0 (0)	0	0 (0)	0	7 (2)	1
