= Sidraílson =

Brazilian footballer

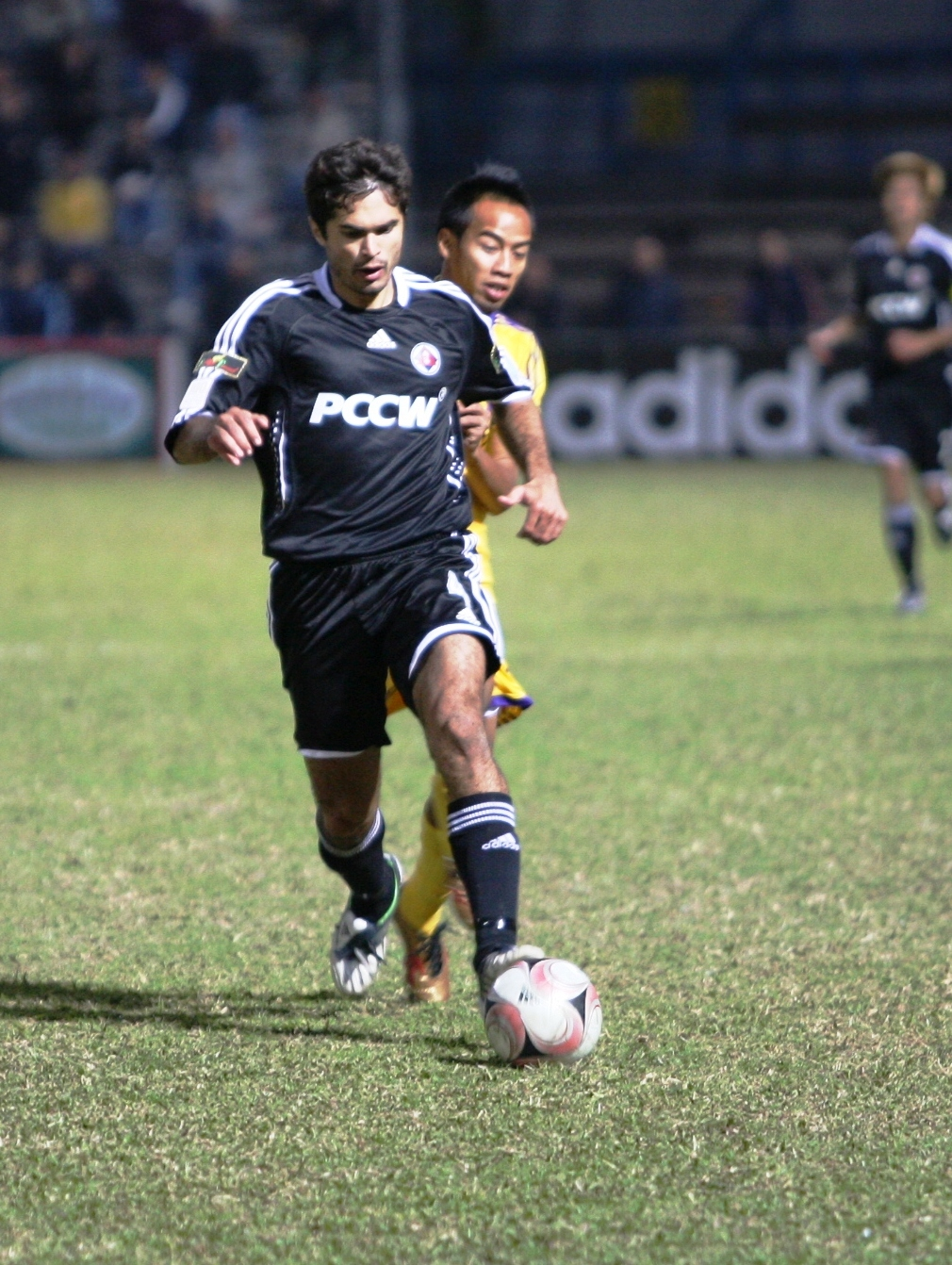

Personal information
- Full name: Sidraílson da Mata Ribeiro
- Date of birth: February 26, 1982 (age 44)
- Place of birth: João Alfredo, Brazil
- Height: 1.83 m (6 ft 0 in)
- Position: Centre-back

Team information
- Current team: Juazeirense

Senior career*
Years	Team	Apps	(Gls)
2001–2004	Santa Cruz	?	(?)
2004–2005	Gil Vicente	7	(0)
2006–2008	Santa Cruz	19	(0)
2007–2008	→ South China (loan)	11	(0)
2008–2010	South China	14	(1)
2010	Santa Cruz	1	(0)
2011	Santo André		
2012	Catanduvense		
2012	Paysandu		
2013	Santa Cruz		
2013–	Juazeirense		
- * Club domestic league appearances and goals as of 10 May 2011

Sidraílson da Mata Ribeiro (born 26 February 1982 in João Alfredo, Pernambuco), commonly known as simply Sidraílson, is a Brazilian football player who currently plays for Juazeirense.

He plays as a defender and joined Hong Kong First Division champions South China before the 2007-08 season. He played for the team in Barclays Asia Trophy 2007 and made his league debut on 2 September 2007 against Kitchee.

Club	Season	League		Senior Shield		League Cup		FA Cup		AFC Cup		Total	
Club	Season	Apps	Goals	Apps	Goals	Apps	Goals	Apps	Goals	Apps	Goals	Apps	Goals
South China	2007-08	11 (0)	0	2 (0)	0	3 (0)	0	1 (1)	0	N/A	N/A	17 (1)	0
South China	2008-09	13 (1)	0	2 (0)	0	0 (0)	0	3 (0)	0	6 (0)	0	24 (1)	0
South China	2009-10	1 (0)	0	0 (0)	0	0 (0)	0	0 (0)	0	0 (0)	0	1 (0)	0
South China	All	25 (1)	0	4 (0)	0	3 (0)	0	4 (1)	0	6	0	42 (2)	0

== Honours ==
South China AA

- Hong Kong First Division League: 3

2007–08, 2008–09, 2009–10

- Hong Kong Senior Challenge Shield: 1

2009–10
