= Cris (footballer, born 1980) =

Brazilian footballer

Personal information
- Full name: Cristiano Alves Pereira
- Date of birth: 9 October 1980 (age 46)
- Place of birth: Joinville, Santa Catarina, Brazil
- Height: 1.85 m (6 ft 1 in)
- Position: Central defender

Team information
- Current team: Juventus-RS

Senior career*
Years	Team	Apps	(Gls)
1997–1998	Joinville		
1998–2000	Rieti		
2000–2001	Juventus		
2001–2003	Chapecoense		
2003–2004	Juventus		
2004–2005	Metropolitano		(?)
2005–2006	FC Rouen	27	(1)
2006–2007	Metropolitano		
2006–2007	→ South China (loan)	18	(1)
2007–2009	South China	41	(4)
2009	Juventus	0	(0)
2010	Brusque	0	(0)
2010	Goiânia		
2010	Marcílio Dias		
2011	Imbituba		
2011	Brasil de Pelotas		
2011	Caxias-SC		
2012	Juventus-RS		

International career
2003	Togo	2	(0)
- * Club domestic league appearances and goals as of 17:42, June 28, 2009 (UTC)

Cristiano Alves Pereira (born 9 October 1980), better known as Cris, is a former footballer who played as a defender. Born and raised in Brazil, he was naturalized by Togo, for whose national team he played internationally.

== Biography ==
Cris was born in Joinville, a city in Santa Catarina, in the Southern Region of Brazil.

Cris was given a trial by Italian Club Brescia FC in 2005, but failed to earn a contract.

He played for Hong Kong First Division League team South China as a loan player before joining the team in the middle of the 2006–07 season.

== International career ==
Cris and other Brazilian-born players played for the Togo national team in June–July 2003 in a 2004 African Cup of Nations Qualifying matches against Cape Verde, Kenya and Mauritania. He also played for Togo against the Ghanaian club Asante Kotoko in a friendly match on June 29, 2003, in Stade de Kégué, Lomé.

== Career statistics in Hong Kong ==
As of May 14, 2008

Club	Season	League		Senior Shield		League Cup		FA Cup		AFC Cup		Total	
Club	Season	Apps	Goals	Apps	Goals	Apps	Goals	Apps	Goals	Apps	Goals	Apps	Goals
South China	2006–07	8 (0)	0	4 (0)	0	3 (0)	1	3 (0)	0	NA	NA	18 (0)	1
South China	2007–08	9 (3)	2	1 (0)	0	6 (0)	0	2 (0)	0	6 (0)	3	24 (3)	5
South China	2008–09	20 (1)	2	2 (0)	0	1 (0)	0	1 (0)	0	NA	NA	24 (1)	2
All	37 (4)	4	7 (0)	0	10 (0)	1	6 (0)	0	6 (0)	3	66 (4)	6	
