= Man Pei Tak =

Hong Kong footballer (born 1982)

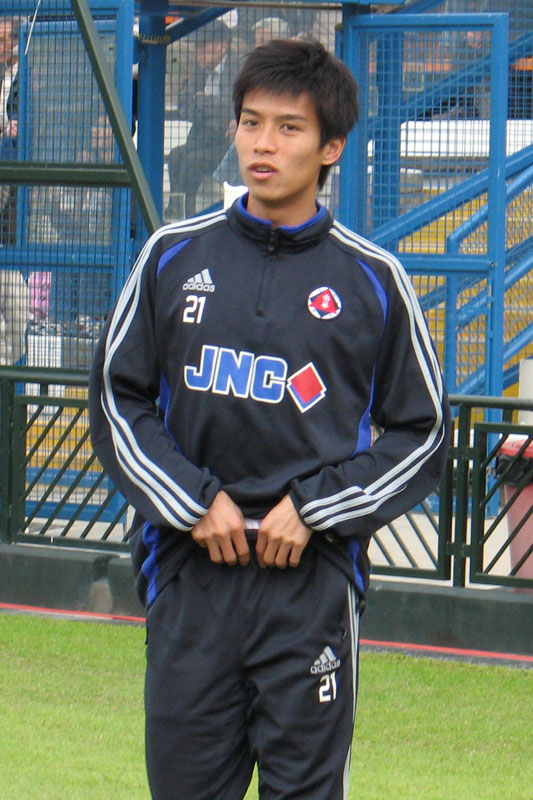

Personal information
- Full name: Peter Man Pei Tak
- Date of birth: 16 February 1982 (age 44)
- Place of birth: Hong Kong
- Height: 1.76 m (5 ft 9 in)
- Positions: Defensive midfielder; centre-back

Senior career*
Years	Team	Apps	(Gls)
2000–2001	Kitchee		
2001–2006	Rangers (HKG)	50	(0)
2006–2013	South China	86	(2)
2013–2015	Eastern	18	(0)
2016–2017	Pegasus	2	(0)
2017–2018	Metro Gallery	20	(1)
2018–2022	Eastern District	39	(5)

International career
2003–2013	Hong Kong	39	(1)

Managerial career
- 2015–2019: Pegasus (director, assistant coach)
- 2019–2020: Pegasus
- 2020–2021: Pegasus (director, assistant coach)
- * Club domestic league appearances and goals

Peter Man Pei Tak (Chinese: 文彼得; Jyutping: man^{4} bei^{2} dak^{1}) is a Hong Kong former professional footballer who played as a defensive midfielder or a centre-back.

== Club career ==
=== 2008–09 ===
On 16 November 2008, Man played as captain and scored a wonder goal to help South China defeat arch rival Kitchee 3–1 in a league match. It was his first goal since he joined the Caroliners.

=== 2010–11 ===
Under coach Kim Pan-Gon, Man's playing opportunities were limited. However, when Kim suddenly left South China near the end of 2010, replacement coach Chan Ho Yin allowed him more opportunities, especially at the right back position.

In the 2011 AFC Cup, during the away game to Persipura Jayapura, Man handled the ball and gave away a penalty which was converted by Boaz Solossa. Persipura eventually won the game 4–2 and knocked South China out of the tournament.

== International career ==
In the 2010 East Asian Football Championship semi-final tournament, Man scored the opening goal against Guam and paved the way for a 12–0 win, allowing Hong Kong to qualify for the finals of the tournament in Japan.

In the 2011 AFC Asian Cup qualifying match away to Bahrain, Man was named captain. But Hong Kong lost the game 0–4.

== Managerial career ==
On 10 July 2019, Man was named head coach of Pegasus. Less than a year into his reign, he was demoted back to director and assistant coach following Kwok Kar Lok's arrival as head coach.

== Personal life ==
In June 2018, Man and his wife Alice welcomed their first child, a son.

== Endorsements ==
Man is a spokesman for Jockey International, along with Hong Kong Pegasus former player Chan Siu Ki.

== Career statistics ==
=== Club ===
As of 10 October 2012

Club	Season	League		Senior Shield		League Cup		FA Cup		AFC Cup		Total	
Club	Season	Apps	Goals	Apps	Goals	Apps	Goals	Apps	Goals	Apps	Goals	Apps	Goals
South China	2006–07	16	0	4	0	5	0	2	0	-	-	27	0
South China	2007–08	14	0	2	0	6	0	1	0	4	0	27	0
South China	2008–09	19	2	2	0	1	0	2	0	6	1	30	3
South China	2009–10	7	0	1	0	-	-	1	0	6	0	15	0
South China	2010–11	9	0	2	0	4	0	1	0	3	0	19	0
South China	2011–12	12	0	2	0	2	0	0	0	-	-	16	0
South China	2012–13	8	0	3	0	-	-	4	0	-	-	15	0
Eastern Salon	2013–14	0	0	0	0	-	-	0	0	-	-	0	0
All		85	2	16	0	18	0	11	0	19	1	125	3

=== International ===
As of 6 February 2013

#	Date	Venue	Opponent	Result	Remark	Competition
1	10 November 2003	Pakhtakor Markaziy Stadium, Tashkent, Uzbekistan	Thailand	2–1		2004 AFC Asian Cup qualification
2	17 November 2003	Rajamangala National Stadium, Bangkok, Thailand	Thailand	0–4		2004 AFC Asian Cup qualification
3	19 November 2003	Rajamangala National Stadium, Bangkok, Thailand	Uzbekistan	0–1		2004 AFC Asian Cup qualification
4	21 November 2003	Rajamangala National Stadium, Bangkok, Thailand	Tajikistan	0–1		2004 AFC Asian Cup qualification
5	4 December 2003	National Stadium, Tokyo, Japan	South Korea	1–3		2003 East Asian Football Championship
6	7 December 2003	Saitama Stadium, Saitama, Japan	Japan	0–1		2003 East Asian Football Championship
7	10 December 2003	International Stadium Yokohama, Yokohama, Japan	China	1–3		2003 East Asian Football Championship
8	4 February 2004	Darulmakmur Stadium, Kuantan, Malaysia	Malaysia	3–1		2006 FIFA World Cup qualification
9	31 March 2004	Siu Sai Wan Sports Ground, Hong Kong	China	0–1		2006 FIFA World Cup qualification
10	9 June 2004	Kazma SC Stadium, Kuwait City, Kuwait	Kuwait	0–4		2006 FIFA World Cup qualification
11	8 September 2004	Siu Sai Wan Sports Ground, Hong Kong	Kuwait	0–2		2006 FIFA World Cup qualification
12	13 October 2004	Mong Kok Stadium, Hong Kong	Malaysia	0–2		2006 FIFA World Cup qualification
13	8 September 2004	Tianhe Stadium, Guangzhou, China PR	China	0–7		2006 FIFA World Cup qualification
14	30 November 2004	Jalan Besar Stadium, Singapore	Singapore	0–0(6–5 PSO)		Friendly
15	12 December 2004	Jalan Besar Stadium, Singapore	Myanmar	2–2		Friendly
16	9 February 2005	Hong Kong Stadium, Hong Kong	Brazil	1–7		2005 Carlsberg Cup
17	5 March 2005	Zhongshan Soccer Stadium, Taipei, Taiwan	Mongolia	6–0		2005 EAFF Championship Preliminary
18	7 March 2005	Zhongshan Soccer Stadium, Taipei, Taiwan	Guam	15–0		2005 EAFF Championship Preliminary
19	11 March 2005	Zhongshan Soccer Stadium, Taipei, Taiwan	Chinese Taipei	5–0		2005 EAFF Championship Preliminary
20	13 March 2005	Zhongshan Soccer Stadium, Taipei, Taiwan	North Korea	0–2		2005 EAFF Championship Preliminary
21	29 January 2006	Hong Kong Stadium, Hong Kong	Denmark	0–3		2006 Carlsberg Cup
22	1 February 2006	Hong Kong Stadium, Hong Kong	Croatia	0–4		2006 Carlsberg Cup
23	15 February 2006	Hong Kong Stadium, Hong Kong	Singapore	1–1		Friendly
24	22 February 2006	Hong Kong Stadium, Hong Kong	Qatar	0–3		2007 AFC Asian Cup qualification
25	1 March 2006	Bangabandhu National Stadium, Dhaka, Bangladesh	Bangladesh	1–0		2007 AFC Asian Cup qualification
26	1 June 2007	Gelora Bung Karno Stadium, Jakarta, Indonesia	Indonesia	0–3		Friendly
27	19 June 2007	Estádio Campo Desportivo, Macau	Chinese Taipei	1–1		2008 EAFF Championship Preliminary
28	21 June 2007	Estádio Campo Desportivo, Macau	Guam	15–1		2008 EAFF Championship Preliminary
29	24 June 2007	Estádio Campo Desportivo, Macau	North Korea	0–1		2008 EAFF Championship Preliminary
30	28 October 2007	Hong Kong Stadium, Hong Kong	Timor-Leste	8–1		2010 FIFA World Cup qualification
31	18 November 2007	Hong Kong Stadium, Hong Kong	Turkmenistan	0–3		2010 FIFA World Cup qualification
32	23 August 2009	World Games Stadium, Kaohsiung, Taiwan	Chinese Taipei	4–0	(c)	2010 EAFF Championship Semi-final
33	25 August 2009	World Games Stadium, Kaohsiung, Taiwan	North Korea	0–0		2010 EAFF Championship Semi-final
34	27 August 2009	World Games Stadium, Kaohsiung, Taiwan	Guam	12–0	Goal	2010 EAFF Championship Semi-final
35	18 November 2009	Hong Kong Stadium, Hong Kong	Japan	0–4		2011 AFC Asian Cup qualification
36	6 January 2010	National Stadium, Madinat 'Isa, Bahrain	Bahrain	0–4	(c)	2011 AFC Asian Cup qualification
37	7 February 2010	Olympic Stadium, Tokyo, Japan	South Korea	0–5		2010 East Asian Football Championship
38	14 February 2010	Olympic Stadium, Tokyo, Japan	China	0–2		2010 East Asian Football Championship
39	6 February 2013	Pakhtakor Stadium, Uzbekistan	Uzbekistan	0–0		2015 AFC Asian Cup qualification
