= Tsang Wai Chung =

Hong Kong footballer (born 1960)

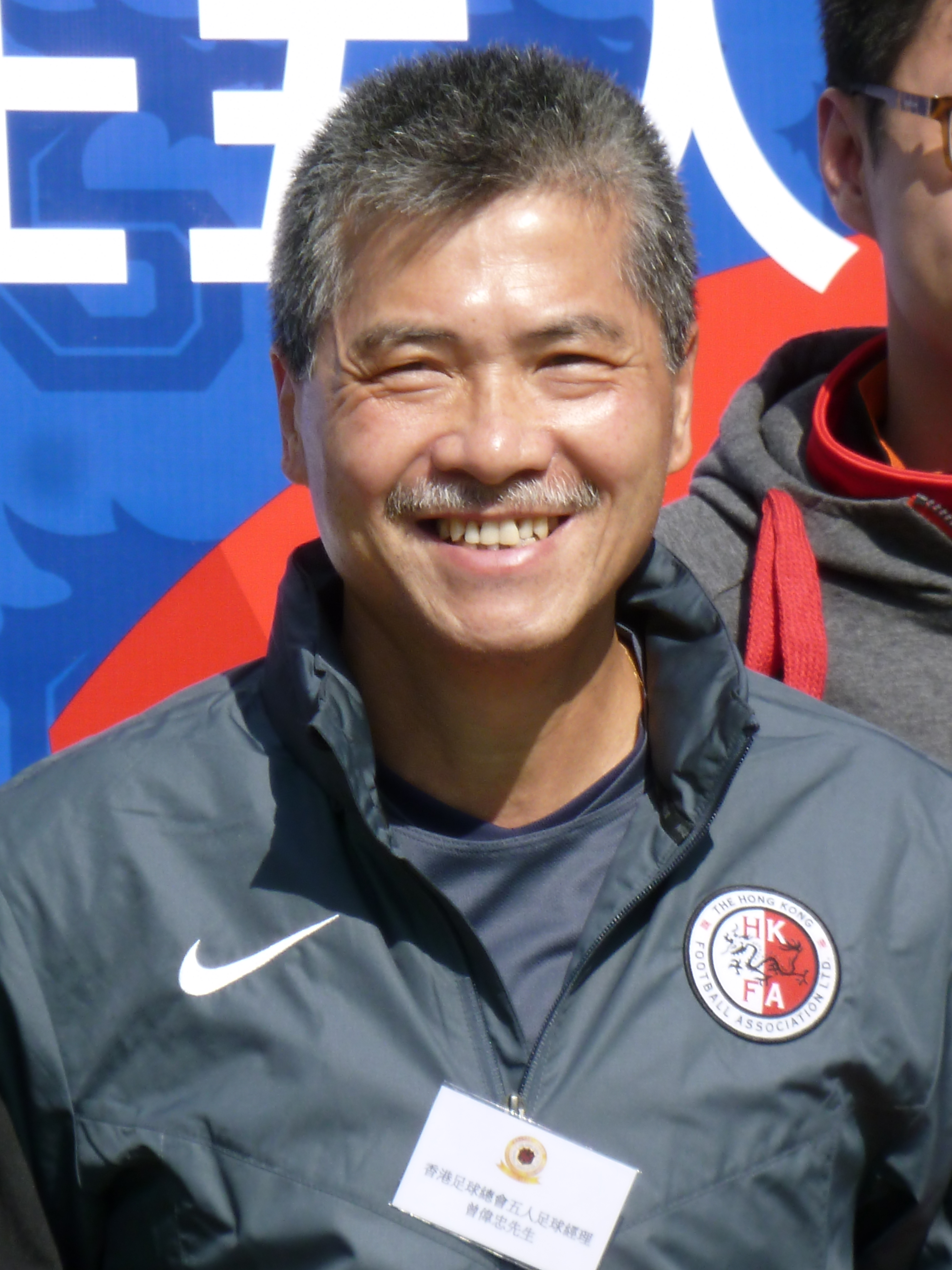
- Tsang in 2014

Personal information
- Date of birth: 28 August 1960 (age 66)
- Positions: Midfielder; forward

Senior career*
Years	Team	Apps	(Gls)
1976–1982	Caroline Hill		
1982–1983	Sea Bee		
1983–1986	Tsuen Wan		
1986–1988	Eastern		(12)
1988–1989	Lai Sun D'Flower		(3)
1989–1990	Lai Sun	16	(1)
1990–1991	Eastern	14	(1)
1991–1994	Sing Tao	55	(4)

Managerial career
- 1994–1996: Sing Tao
- 1996: Hong Kong
- 1996–1998: Eastern
- 2008: South China
- 2010–2011: Hong Kong
- 2010–2011: Hong Kong U23
- * Club domestic league appearances and goals

Tsang Wai Chung (Chinese: 曾偉忠; Jyutping: zang^{1} wai^{5} zung^{1}; born 28 August 1960) is a Hong Kong former football player and coach.

In his playing career, he played as a for Caroline Hill, Sea Bee, Eastern, Tsuen Wan, Lai Sun and Sing Tao.

After he retired, he coached Sing Tao, Eastern and the Hong Kong national football team. On 17 September 2008, Tsang asked to leave South China for health reasons. He temporarily left the responsibility of head coach and worked as team adviser. Assistant coach Liu Chun Fai took up the responsibility to take care of the team. He coached the Hong Kong national team in 1996 and from 2010 to 201.

He holds an AFC Grade A Coach licence.
