= 2008–09 in Hong Kong football =

The 2008–09 season in Hong Kong football, starting July 2008 and ending June 2009:

== Events ==
On 9 July 2008, South China goalkeeper Zhang Chunhui was sentenced imprisonment for 8 months due to inflicting grievous bodily harm upon another person. He injured a 17-year-old boy in Causeway Bay on 19 December 2007.

On 22 July 2008, HKFA confirmed the Hong Kong First Division League team list for 2008-09 season. 13 teams will compete in the top division, among which TSW Pegasus and Xiangxue Eisiti will enter using competing membership, and they will need to sponsor one local cup competition each. There are two team name changes: Lanwa Redbull renamed to be Sheffield United and Wofoo Tai Po renames to be NT Realty Wofoo Tai Po.

On 2 September 2008, the 2008–09 season of Hong Kong First Division League started at Hong Kong Stadium, with the match between South China and Citizen, with Citizen drawing South China 1–1.

On 17 September 2008, South China head coach Tsang Wai Chung left his post.

== Representative team ==
=== Hong Kong Team ===
The home team is on the left column; the away team is on the right column.

==== Friendly matches ====
2008-11-19
19:00 GMT+8

Macau	1 – 9	Hong Kong
Iek Kim Pang ?'		Lee Wai Lim 5', 66', ?'; Cheng Siu Wai 10'; Chan Siu Ki 19', ?', 55', 63'; Au Yeung Yiu Chung 30'

Macau UST Stadium, Macau

2009-01-14
20:00 GMT+8

Hong Kong	2 – 1	India
Au Yeung Yiu Chung 70'; Ng Wai Chiu 90'	(Report)	Bhutia 80'

Hong Kong Stadium, Hong Kong
Attendance: 1,200

==== Guangdong-Hong Kong Cup ====
Hong Kong representative football team participated in 31st Guangdong-Hong Kong Cup.

2009-01-01
15:00 GMT+8

Guangdong	3 – 1	Hong Kong
Shi Liang 15', 33'; Zhao Huang 53'	(Report)	Chan Siu Ki 54'

Yuexiushan Stadium, Guangzhou
Attendance: 18,000
Referee: Sun Bing

2009-01-04
15:15 GMT+8

Hong Kong	4 – 1 (a.e.t.)	Guangdong
Chan Siu Ki 31'; Lee Wai Lim 45'; Xu Deshuai 49'; Leung Chun Pong 94'	(Report)	Yin Hongbo 74' (pen.)

Mong Kok Stadium, Hong Kong
Attendance: 3,395
Referee: Ng Kai Lam

==== Asian Cup qualifiers ====
Hong Kong is going to play in their Asian Cup 2011 qualifying campaign.

2009-01-21
19:30 UTC+8

Hong Kong	1 – 3	Bahrain
Cheng Siu Wai 90'	(Report)	Abdullatif 10'; Fatadi 37'; Salman Isa 87'

Hong Kong Stadium, Hong Kong
Attendance: 6,013
Referee: Vo Minh Tri (Vietnam)

2009-01-28
16:15 UTC+3

Yemen	1 – 0	Hong Kong
Al Selwi 52'	(Report)

Ali Muhesen Stadium, Sana'a
Attendance: 10,000
Referee: Abdullah Al Hilali (Oman)

=== Hong Kong U-23 ===
==== Hong Kong Macau Interport ====
2009-06-20
16:00 UTC+8

Hong Kong	5 – 1	Macau
Yeung Chi Lun 13'; Pak Wing Chak 21'; Leung Kam Fai 63' (pen.); Leung Chun Pong 65'; To Hon To 84'	(Report)	Ho Man Hou 28'

Mong Kok Stadium, Hong Kong
Attendance: 350
Referee: Ng Kai Lam (Hong Kong)

== Honours ==
Competition	Winner	Details
First Division	South China	First Division 2008–09
Senior Shield	TSW Pegasus	Senior Shield 2008–09; Beat Convoy Sun Hei 3–0
FA Cup	NT Realty Wofoo Tai Po	FA Cup 2008–09; Beat TSW Pegasus 4–2
League Cup	Convoy Sun Hei	League Cup 2008–09; Beat TSW Pegasus 4–2 on penalties after 2–2 draw
Second Division	Shatin	Second Division 2008–09
Third Division Final	Tuen Mun	
Third Division "A"	Lucky Mile	
Third Division "District"	Tuen Mun	
Junior Shield	Shatin	Beat Sham Shui Po 2–0
HKFA 7-A-Side Competition	Convoy Sun Hei Team A	2008–09 HKFA 7-A-Side Competition; Beat Kitchee Team B 1–0

== Overall Top-scorers ==
=== First Division ===
Rank	Player	Club	Goal(s) scored				
Rank	Player	Club	League	Shield	L.C.	FA Cup	Total
1	(Brazil) Giovane	Convoy Sun Hei	16	2	6	0	24
2	(Brazil) Detinho	South China	18	0	0	0	18
3	(Brazil) Sandro	Citizen	15	1	0	0	16
4	(Cameroon) Guy Junior Ondoua	TSW Pegasus	7	6	–	–	13
4	(Hong Kong) Chan Siu Ki	South China	12	1	0	0	13

== Asian clubs competitions ==
=== AFC Cup 2008 ===
- Kitchee - Eliminated in group stage
- South China - Eliminated in group stage

=== AFC Cup 2009 ===
- Eastern - Eliminated in group stage
- South China - Quarter-finals

== Hong Kong Top Footballers Awards ==
- Footballer of the Year: (Hong Kong) Lee Wai Lim (NT Realty Wofoo Tai Po)
- Best Youth Footballer: (Hong Kong) Au Yeung Yiu Chung (South China), (Hong Kong) Li Hon Ho (NT Realty Wofoo Tai Po)
- Coach of the Year: (Hong Kong) Leslie Santos (Convoy Sun Hei)
- Top Footballers:
  1. (Hong Kong) Wong Chin Hung (TSW Pegasus / South China)
  2. (Hong Kong) Li Haiqiang (South China)
  3. (Hong Kong) Lee Kin Wo (Eastern)
  4. (Hong Kong) Xu Deshuai (Citizen)
  5. (Brazil) Edgar Aldrighi Júnior (NT Realty Wofoo Tai Po)
  6. (Hong Kong) Lee Hong Lim (NT Realty Wofoo Tai Po / TSW Pegasus)
  7. (Hong Kong) Lee Wai Lim (NT Realty Wofoo Tai Po)
  8. (Brazil) Tales Schutz (South China)
  9. (Brazil) Itaparica (TSW Pegasus)
  10. (Hong Kong) Chan Siu Ki (South China)
  11. (Brazil) Giovane (Convoy Sun Hei)

== Exhibition matches ==
=== ING Cup ===
2008-07-30
18:30 UTC+8

Ivory Coast U-23	0 – 0	(United States) USA U-23
	Report

Hong Kong Stadium
Attendance: 6,039

2008-07-30
20:45 UTC+8

Cameroon U-23	0 – 2	Netherlands U-23
	Report	Babel 87'; Makaay 90'

Hong Kong Stadium
Attendance: 6,039

2008-08-02
17:00 UTC+8

Cameroon U-23	1 – 0	(United States) USA U-23
Chedjou 25' (pen.)	Report

Hong Kong Stadium
Attendance: 6,728
Referee: Liu Kwok Man

2008-08-02
19:30 UTC+8

Ivory Coast U-23	1 – 1	Netherlands U-23
Gervinho 47'	Report	Emanuelson 14'

Hong Kong Stadium
Attendance: 6,728

P	Team	Pld	W	D	L	GF	GA	GD	Pts
1	Netherlands U-23	2	1	1	0	3	1	+2	7
2	Cameroon U-23	2	1	0	1	1	2	-1	4
3	Ivory Coast U-23	2	0	2	0	1	1	0	3
4	(United States) USA U-23	2	0	1	1	0	1	-1	1

- MVP award: (Netherlands) Urby Emanuelson

=== Lunar New Year Cup ===
See 2009 Lunar New Year Cup.
