= 2008 in China =

- Decades: 1980s; 1990s; 2000s; 2010s; 2020s
- See also: Other events of 2008; History of China • Timeline • Years

Events in the year 2008 in China.

== Incumbents ==
- General Secretary of the Chinese Communist Party: Hu Jintao
- President: Hu Jintao
- Premier: Wen Jiabao
- Vice President: Zeng Qinghong to March 16, Xi Jinping
- Vice Premier: Wu Yi to March 16, Li Keqiang
- Congress Chairman: Wu Bangguo
- Conference Chairman: Jia Qinglin

=== Governors ===
- Governor of Anhui Province – Wang Sanyun
- Governor of Fujian Province – Huang Xiaojing
- Governor of Gansu Province – Xu Shousheng
- Governor of Guangdong Province – Huang Huahua
- Governor of Guizhou Province – Lin Shusen
- Governor of Hainan Province – Luo Baoming
- Governor of Hebei Province – Guo Gengmao (until April), Hu Chunhua (starting April)
- Governor of Heilongjiang Province – Li Zhanshu
- Governor of Henan Province – Li Chengyu (until unknown), Guo Gengmao (starting April)
- Governor of Hubei Province – Luo Qingquan
- Governor of Hunan Province – Zhou Qiang
- Governor of Jiangsu Province – Liang Baohua (until January), Luo Zhijun (starting January)
- Governor of Jiangxi Province – Wu Xinxiong
- Governor of Jilin Province – Han Changfu
- Governor of Liaoning Province – Chen Zhenggao
- Governor of Qinghai Province – Song Xiuyan
- Governor of Shaanxi Province – Yuan Chunqing
- Governor of Shandong Province – Jiang Daming
- Governor of Shanxi Province – Meng Xuenong (until September), Wang Jun (starting December)
- Governor of Sichuan Province – Jiang Jufeng
- Governor of Yunnan Province – Qin Guangrong
- Governor of Zhejiang Province – Lü Zushan

== Events ==
- In 2008, China began the Thousand Talents Program.

=== January ===
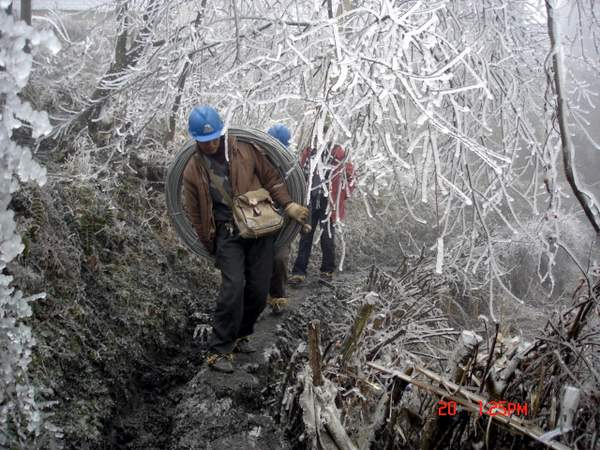
2008 Chinese winter storms: Residents battle China's worst snow storm in 50 years.

- January 25 – 2008 Chinese winter storms: China's worst snowstorm since 1954, delays traffic, and causes massive power outages in central and southern parts of the country. According to Chinese news agency Xinhua report, 133 killed by 2008 China blizzard with snowstorm during January and February.
- 2008 Republic of China legislative election

=== February ===
- Edison Chen photo scandal
- The price of food continues its sharp rise, jumping by as much as 23% from January.

=== March ===
- March 14 – 2008 Tibetan unrest: Demonstrations by Tibetan separatists turn violent as rioters target government and Han Chinese-owned buildings.
- March 17 – 2nd Asian Film Awards were given in a ceremony at the Hong Kong Convention and Exhibition Centre as part of the Hong Kong International Film Festival.
- March 22 - 2008 presidential election; with 58.48% of the vote, KMT candidate Ma Ying-jeou defeats DPP candidate Frank Hsieh. Many voters boycott the referendum on whether and how to join UN so the level of voter participation required for referendum to be considered valid is not achieved.
- 2008 National People's Congress
- 2008 People's Republic of China presidential election
- 2008 Republic of China presidential election
- 2008 Chinese heparin adulteration

=== April ===
- April 1 – Ren Xiaofeng and Ma Xiangjing, the perpetrators of the largest bank robbery in Chinese history, are executed.
- April 14 – 27th Hong Kong Film Awards
- April 28 – 2008 China Railways train T195 accident: 71 die in a train crash in Shandong, China.
- Protests in London, Paris and San Francisco during 2008 Olympic Torch Relay.
- 2008 Demonstrations against Carrefour supermarket chain
- Tanker An Yue Jiang containing arms sold to Zimbabwe refused entry into Southern Africa.
- Miss Tourism Queen International

=== May ===
- May 1 - The Hangzhou Bay Bridge opened to the public.

A 7.9-magnitude earthquake in Sichuan, China killed nearly 88,000 people

- May 11 – China Commercial Aircraft Corporation (COMAC) was founded.
- May 12 – 2008 Sichuan earthquake: Over 70,000 killed in central south-west China by the Wenchuan quake, an earthquake measuring 7.9 Moment magnitude scale. The epicenter is 90 kilometers (56 mi) west-northwest of the provincial capital Chengdu, Sichuan province.
- May 20 – Ma Ying-jeou and Vincent Siew, both of the Kuomintang Party, sworn in as President and Vice President of the Republic of China.
- President Hu Jintao visits Japan, meets with Yasuo Fukuda, makes speech at Waseda University.

=== June ===
- June 4–8 – 2008 Jiangsu Snooker Classic
- June 10 – The 270 ton sport fishing vessel Lien Ho of Taiwan suffered a collision with a Japanese patrol vessel, Koshiki, and subsequently sank, while in the disputed territorial waters around the Diaoyutai Islands that have been claimed by Japan and Taiwan (ROC). The Taiwanese crew who were aboard the vessel claims that the larger Japanese frigate deliberately crashed into them; their assertions are backed up by recently released video footage.
- June 13 – Gas leak kills six and injures 28 at Chinese fertiliser factory (Wikinews)
- June 14–22 – 2008 Shanghai International Film Festival
- June 20 – Colonel Wang Hui-hsien, a former Military Intelligence Bureau (MIB) analyst, is arrested in Taiwan on charges of selling state secrets to Mainland China.
- June 22 – Controversial journalist Lu Keng passes away at age 89.
- June 28 – The 2008 Guizhou riot takes place following the alleged cover-up by authorities over the death of a teenage girl.
- Meetings between the PRC and ROC take place, improving Cross-strait relations.
- Summer 2008 South China floods
- The Chinese government buys Mount Toromocho Copper Mine in Peru for US$3 billion, with potentially two billion tonnes of copper ore. The deal was brokered by Chinalco, a PRC-government owned company.
- The Republic of China (Taiwan) reasserts claim to the Diaoyutai Islands.
- China's national soccer team is victorious over the Australian Socceroos team during the FIFA World Cup qualifier at Sydney Olympic Stadium for the first time in history. The resulting 1–0 defeat for the Socceroos was their first home defeat in a World Cup qualifier in 27 years.

=== July ===
- July 1 – A jobless Beijing resident Yang Jia killed six police officers in a Shanghai police station.
- Resumption of Weekend Cross-strait charters between Taiwan and Mainland China after 59 years.
- July 4 – Chinese Wikipedia unblocked by government (Wikinews)
- July 10 – Migrant workers riot in Zhejiang province in Eastern China for three days, which originated from quarrels between workers and police.
- July 16 – 2008 Chinese milk scandal: Gansu Province reports to the Ministry of Health that sixteen infants in Gansu Province who had been fed on milk powder produced by Shijiazhuang-based Sanlu Group were diagnosed with kidney stones.
- July 17 – The Chinese National People's Congress holds a press conference and releases mid-year financial statistics on the nation's GDP.
- July 17–21 – 2008 Stanković Continental Champions' Cup held in Hangzhou.
- July 21 – Bomb blasts in Southern China, targeting commuter buses.
- July 28 – Typhoon Fung-wong strikes Fujian, China.
- Six-party talks on North Korea's nuclear weapons program continue in Beijing.
- Typhoon Kalmaegi strikes areas in China.
- Chinese officials claim to have foiled a terrorist plot against the Shanghai Stadium.

=== August ===
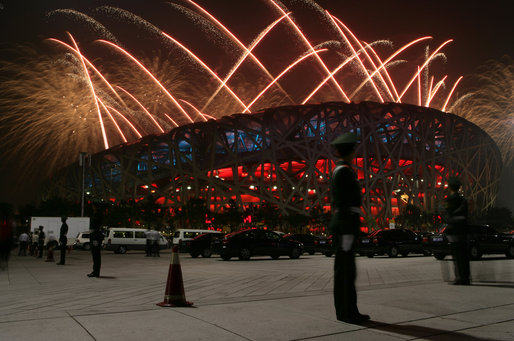
Fireworks held during the 2008 Summer Olympics opening ceremony at the Beijing National Stadium

- August 3 – The International Olympic Committee and Chinese organizers announce that all Internet restrictions have been lifted for media covering the Beijing Games.
- August 3 – A total solar eclipse is visible from China.
- August 4 – 2008 Xinjiang attack
- August 5 – A 6.0 M_{w} aftershock of the 2008 Sichuan earthquake affects Qingchuan County. Four people were killed and twenty-nine were injured.
- August 8 – 2008 Summer Olympics A ceremony marked the beginning of the Olympic Games in Beijing.
- August 12 – Floods and landslides associated with Tropical Storm Kammuri kill 28 people in southwest China and force 11,000 people from their homes.
- August 14 – 2008 Summer Olympics: China's Liu Zige wins the 2008 Beijing Olympics' women's 200 meters butterfly gold setting a world record of two minutes and 04.18 seconds.
- August 19 – 2008 Yingjiang earthquakes
- August 21 - 2008 Beijing Wushu Tournament
- August 26 – 2008 Guangxi chemical plant explosions
- August 30 – 2008 Panzhihua earthquake: A 6.1 magnitude earthquake strikes the southern Sichuan province, causing over 40 deaths, the collapse of 10,000 homes and damage to other infrastructure in the area.
- Leung Chin-man appointment controversy

=== September ===
- September 2 – Further flooding occurs in coastal China.
- September 5 – Investigation and trial of former ROC President Chen Shui-Bian over corruption charges.
- September 6 - 2008 Summer Paralympics: The thirteenth Paralympic Games began in Beijing.
- September 7 – 2008 Hong Kong legislative election
- September 8 – 2008 Shanxi mudslide
- The 2008 Chinese milk scandal, a food safety incident involving milk and infant formula which had been adulterated with melamine, broke on 9 September.
- September 10 – Chinese video sharing website Tudou receives its SARFT license.
- September 15–21 – 2008 Guangzhou International Women's Open
- September 18 – An open beta of the high-definition channel of the Chinese video sharing website Tudou, also known as Heidou, is released for public use.
- September 20 – Fuhua Mining Co. Ltd., coal mine accident (3:30 a.m. – 7:30 p.m. GMT Friday) in Hegang city, Heilongjiang province, where initially 5 miners were killed, and 27 trapped. On September 27, a total of 31 miners died.
- September 21 – 2008 Shenzhen club fire
- September 25 – The third human spaceflight mission of the Chinese space program, Shenzhou 7, is launched.
- September 26 – First public release of Anti-Japan War Online, a locally developed patriotic MMORPG game, released in China.
- September 27 – Shenzhou 7 Zhai Zhigang first Chinese person to spacewalk on Shenzhou 7
- September 28 – 13th Computer Olympiad held in Beijing. (to 5 October)
- September 29 – Shanghai Masters 2008 (to 5 October)
- September 30 – Rendition of Zhou Yongjun by Hong Kong to the PRC

=== October ===
- October 6 – 2008 Damxung earthquake
- October 20 – Windows Genuine Advantage introduced onto Chinese language computers, causing issues for the large majority of users in China running an unauthorized copy of Microsoft Windows
- October 20 – Japanese and Chinese students clash at the Shanghai International Studies University, sparking mass violence within the campus and controversy regarding Anti-Japanese sentiment among Chinese youths. Ten police vehicles were dispatched to quell the violence.
- October 21 – Zhang Mingqing (張銘清), Beijing official for the Association for Relations Across the Taiwan Strait, was attacked by Taiwan Independence activists.
- October 23 – Chinese dissident Hu Jia wins European Union human rights prize
- October 30 – Evermore Office suite 2009 downloaded 5.3 million times since Microsoft began its anti-copying measures with Windows Genuine Advantage.

=== November ===
- November 3 – Second Chen-Chiang summit
- November 4 – 2008 Taiwan-China Cross Straits Economic Pact
- November 6 - Wild Strawberries Movement in Taiwan.
- November 7 – 2008 Shenzhen anti-police riot
- November 9 – 2008 Chinese economic stimulus plan
- November 14 – The Chinese fishing vessel FV Tianyu No. 8 was seized by Somali pirates while fishing off the coast of Kenya.
- November 17 – 2008 Longnan riot
- November 18–23 – 2008 China Open Super Series
- November 24–30 – 2008 Hong Kong Super Series
- November 25 – Dongguan toy factory riot
- November 28 – Wo Weihan executed on spying for Taiwan charges
- Miss International 2008
- Hong Kong Senior Challenge Shield 2008–09
- Lien Chen meets Hu Jintao at APEC Peru 2008, highest level cross-strait exchange since 1949

=== December ===
- December 3 – Internet cafes in Nanchang, are required to install the Chinese Linux distribution Red Flag Linux as a replacement for unlicensed versions of the popular Microsoft Windows operating system, or switch to legitimate copies of Microsoft Windows.
- December 10 – Charter 08
- December 13 – The leaders of China, Japan and South Korea meet in Fukuoka, Japan for a trilateral meeting promoting political ties.
- December 17 – The MV Zhenhua 4, a Chinese fishing boat owned by China Communications Construction, was hijacked by Somali pirates on the way back to Shanghai, but deterred as crews radioed for help. The 30 crew members fought for four hours after nine pirates armed with rocket launchers and heavy machine guns boarded the ship. A Malaysian warship, Sri Indera Sakti and Malaysian military helicopter arrived and fired on the pirates, who fled the scene. No crew members were injured. The crew used water cannons, molotov cocktails and beer bottles to defend against the pirates, whom were fully armed.
- December 18 – Chinese warships depart for the Gulf of Aden in response to the growing threat of Somali pirates. This is the first time China has sent ships on a mission that could involve fighting so far beyond its territorial waters.

== Sports ==
- January 6: 2nd leg of the 2008 Guangdong–Hong Kong Cup
- January 8 and 11: 2008 Lunar New Year Cup
- January 19: 2007–08 Hong Kong League Cup (to 22 March)
- January 24: 2008 Hong Kong–Shanghai Inter Club Championship
- January 25 – 27: International Youth Football Invitation Tournament 2008 in Hong Kong.
- February 18 – 24: Women's East Asian Cup 2008
- March 5 – June 24: East Asian Cup 2008
- March 15 – 16: MLB China Series
- March 24 and 30: China Open 2008 (snooker)
- March 28 – 30: 2008 Hong Kong Sevens
- April 18 – 20: 2008 World Fencing Championships held at the Olympic Green Convention Center in Beijing, China.
- April 23: 2007–08 Hong Kong FA Cup
- May 2 – 4: 2008 Chinese motorcycle Grand Prix
- May 29 – June 1: 2008 UCI BMX World Championships took place in Taiyuan, China.
- August – 2008–09 HKFA 7-A-Side Competition
- August 8 – 24: 2008 Summer Olympics
- September 6 – 17: 2008 Summer Paralympics
- October 17 – 19: 2008 Chinese Grand Prix
- October 3 – 18: World Mind Sports Games held in Beijing, China.
- November 9 – 16: 2008 Tennis Masters Cup
- November 9: 2008–09 A1 Grand Prix of Nations, China
- November 22 – 29: 2008 AIBA Women's World Boxing Championship held in Ningbo City.

== Births ==
- August 18 – Gordey Kolesov, Russian-Chinese prodigy

== Deaths ==
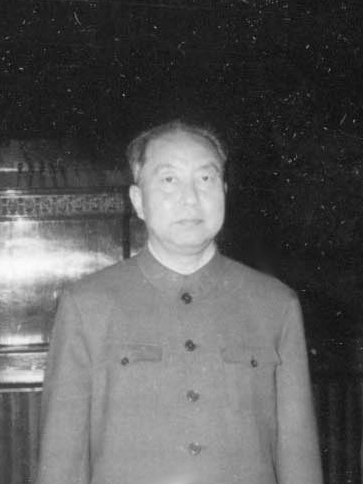
Hua Guofeng

- January 16 – Chen Xilu, 80, Roman Catholic Bishop of Hengshui, organ failure.
- January 26 – Zhang Hanzhi, 72, diplomat and linguist, English tutor for Mao, Nixon interpreter for 1972 visit, lung-related illness.
- February 21 – Tian Bao, 92, government official, one of the first ethnic Tibetans to join Mao Zedong's army and embrace Communism.
- February 25 – Charles Chan, 93, father of actor Jackie Chan, prostate cancer.
- April 4 – Wu Xueqian, 87, politician, foreign minister (1982–1988).
- April 5 – Wang Donglei, 23, footballer, car accident. (Chinese)
- June 24 – Shao Hua, 69, photographer, PLA major general, daughter-in-law of Mao Zedong.
- August 20 – Hua Guofeng, 87, premier (1976–1980), chairman of the Chinese Communist Party (1976–1981).
- August 24 – Wei Wei, 88, poet and writer, liver cancer.
- September 14 – Mu Tiezhu, 59, basketball player, heart attack.
- October 5 – Kim Chan, 93/94?, Chinese-born American actor.
- October 18 – Xie Jin, 84, film director.
- October 24 – Xiao Ke, 101, general in the People's Liberation Army, illness.
- October 28 – Kung Te-cheng, 88, Chinese-born Taiwanese 77th generation descendant of Confucius, heart and respiratory failure.
- November 1 – Tan Jiazhen, 100, geneticist
- November 10 – Li Ximing, 82, Beijing Chinese Communist Party Committee Secretary.
- November 26 – Yang Jia, 28, mass murderer, executed.
- November 28 – Wo Weihan, 59, biochemist, executed.

== See also ==
- List of Chinese films of 2008
- 2008 in Chinese football
- 2008 Chinese heparin adulteration
- Chinese Football Association Yi League 2008
- Chinese Football Association Jia League 2008
- Chinese Super League 2008
- Hong Kong League Cup 2008–09

=== Tropical Typhoons of 2008 ===
- Tropical Storm Kammuri (2008)
- Typhoon Fengshen (2008)
- Typhoon Neoguri (2008)
- Typhoon Nuri (2008)
