= Yaminsky =

Yaminsky Яминский
- Khutor
- Location within Volgograd Oblast Location within Russia
- Coordinates: 50°11′N 42°20′E
- Country: Russia
- Region: Volgograd Oblast
- District: Alexeyevsky District
- Time zone: UTC+4:00

Yaminsky (Russian: Яминский) is a rural locality (a khutor) in Solontsovskoye Rural Settlement, Alexeyevsky District, Volgograd Oblast, Russia. The population was 55 as of the 2010 census.

== Geography ==
The village is located 17 km south-east from Alexeyevskaya and 4 km west from Solontsovsky.
