= Yezhovka, Alexeyevsky District, Volgograd Oblast =

Yezhovka Ежовка
- Khutor
- Location within Volgograd Oblast Location within Russia
- Coordinates: 49°59′N 41°41′E
- Country: Russia
- Region: Volgograd Oblast
- District: Alexeyevsky District
- Time zone: UTC+4:00

Yezhovka (Russian: Ежовка) is a rural locality (a khutor) in Ryabovskoye Rural Settlement, Alexeyevsky District, Volgograd Oblast, Russia. The population was 160 as of 2010.

== Geography ==
Yezhovka is located on the Malaya Peskovatka River, 73 km southwest of Alexeyevskaya (the district's administrative centre) by road. Ryabovsky is the nearest rural locality.
