= Kolesov =

Kolesov may refer to

- Kolesov (surname)
- Kolesov RD-36-51, a supersonic turbojet engine
- Kolešov, a village and municipality in the Czech Republic
