= Larinsky =

Larinsky Ларинский
- Khutor
- Location within Volgograd Oblast Location within Russia
- Coordinates: 50°14′N 42°14′E
- Country: Russia
- Region: Volgograd Oblast
- District: Alexeyevsky District
- Time zone: UTC+4:00

Larinsky (Russian: Ларинский) is a rural locality (a khutor) and the administrative center of Larinskoye Rural Settlement, Alexeyevsky District, Volgograd Oblast, Russia. The population was 647 as of 2010.

== Geography ==
Larinsky is located 9 km southeast of Alexeyevskaya (the district's administrative centre) by road. Checherovsky is the nearest rural locality.
