= Solontsovsky =

Solontsovsky Солонцовский
- Khutor
- Location within Volgograd Oblast Location within Russia
- Coordinates: 50°10′N 42°24′E
- Country: Russia
- Region: Volgograd Oblast
- District: Alexeyevsky District
- Time zone: UTC+4:00

Solontsovsky (Russian: Солонцовский) is a rural locality (a khutor) and the administrative center of Solontsovskoye Rural Settlement, Alexeyevsky District, Volgograd Oblast, Russia. The population was 560 as of 2010.

== Geography ==
Solontsovsky is located 24 km southeast of Alexeyevskaya (the district's administrative centre) by road. Yaminsky is the nearest rural locality.
