= Samolshinsky =

Samolshinsky Самолшинский
- Khutor
- Location within Volgograd Oblast Location within Russia
- Coordinates: 50°22′N 42°03′E
- Country: Russia
- Region: Volgograd Oblast
- District: Alexeyevsky District
- Time zone: UTC+4:00

Samolshinsky (Russian: Самолшинский) is a rural locality (a khutor) and the administrative centre of Samolshinskoye Rural Settlement, Alexeyevsky District, Volgograd Oblast, Russia. The population was 413 as of 2010.

== Geography ==
Samolshinsky is located 15 km northwest of stanitsa Alexeyevskaya (the district's administrative centre) by road. Pimkinsky is the nearest rural locality.
