= Titovsky =

Titovsky Титовский
- Khutor
- Location within Volgograd Oblast Location within Russia
- Coordinates: 50°10′43″N 42°15′24″E
- Country: Russia
- Region: Volgograd Oblast
- District: Alexeyevsky District
- Time zone: UTC+4:00

Titovsky (Russian: Титовский) is a rural locality (a khutor) in Ust-Buzulukskoye Rural Settlement, Alexeyevsky District, Volgograd Oblast, Russia. The population was 227 as of 2010.

== Geography ==
Titovsky is located on the right bank of the Khopyor River, 17 km southeast of Alexeyevskaya (the district's administrative centre) by road. Barminsky is the nearest rural locality.
