= Tryokhlozhinsky =

Tryokhlozhinsky Трёхложинский
- Khutor
- Location within Volgograd Oblast Location within Russia
- Coordinates: 50°04′N 42°03′E
- Country: Russia
- Region: Volgograd Oblast
- District: Alexeyevsky District
- Time zone: UTC+4:00

Tryokhlozhinsky (Russian: Трёхложинский) is a rural locality (a khutor) and the administrative center of Tryokhlozhinskoye Rural Settlement, Alexeyevsky District, Volgograd Oblast, Russia. The population was 337 as of 2010.

== Geography ==
Tryokhlozhinsky is located 42 km southwest of Alexeyevskaya (the district's administrative centre) by road. Arepyev is the nearest rural locality.
