= Bolshaya Tavolzhanka =

Bolshaya Tavolzhanka Большая Таволжанка
- Khutor
- Location within Volgograd Oblast Location within Russia
- Coordinates: 50°20′N 42°24′E
- Country: Russia
- Region: Volgograd Oblast
- District: Alexeyevsky District
- Time zone: UTC+4:00

Bolshaya Tavolzhanka (Russian: Большая Таволжанка) is a rural locality (a khutor) in Krasnooktyabrskoye Rural Settlement, Alexeyevsky District, Volgograd Oblast, Russia. The population was 112 as of 2010.

== Geography ==
Bolshaya Tavolzhanka is located 19 km northeast of Alexeyevskaya (the district's administrative centre) by road. Krasny Oktyabr is the nearest rural locality.
