= Gushchinsky =

Gushchinsky Гущинский
- Khutor
- Location within Volgograd Oblast Location within Russia
- Coordinates: 50°19′N 42°01′E
- Country: Russia
- Region: Volgograd Oblast
- District: Alexeyevsky District
- Time zone: UTC+4:00

Gushchinsky (Russian: Гущинский) is a rural locality (a khutor) in Samolshinskoye Rural Settlement, Alexeyevsky District, Volgograd Oblast, Russia. The population was 184 as of 2010.

== Geography ==
Gushchinsky is located 16 km northwest of Alexeyevskaya (the district's administrative centre) by road. Tishanskaya is the nearest rural locality.
