= Ugolsky =

Ugolsky Угольский
- Khutor
- Location within Volgograd Oblast Location within Russia
- Coordinates: 50°13′N 42°07′E
- Country: Russia
- Region: Volgograd Oblast
- District: Alexeyevsky District
- Time zone: UTC+4:00

Ugolsky (Russian: Угольский) is a rural locality (a khutor) in Stezhenskoye Rural Settlement, Alexeyevsky District, Volgograd Oblast, Russia. The population was 87 as of 2015.

== Geography ==
Ugolsky is located 15 km southwest of Alexeyevskaya (the district's administrative centre) by road. Ust-Buzulukskaya is the nearest rural locality.
