= Checherovsky =

Checherovsky Чечеровский
- Khutor
- Location within Volgograd Oblast Location within Russia
- Coordinates: 50°16′N 42°15′E
- Country: Russia
- Region: Volgograd Oblast
- District: Alexeyevsky District
- Time zone: UTC+4:00

Checherovsky (Russian: Чечеровский) is a rural locality (a khutor) in Larinskoye Rural Settlement, Alexeyevsky District, Volgograd Oblast, Russia. The population was 181 as of 2010.

== Geography ==
Checherovsky is located 8 km southeast of Alexeyevskaya (the district's administrative centre) by road. Larinsky is the nearest rural locality.
