= Isakiyevsky =

Isakiyevsky Исакиевский
- Khutor
- Location within Volgograd Oblast Location within Russia
- Coordinates: 50°28′N 42°11′E
- Country: Russia
- Region: Volgograd Oblast
- District: Alexeyevsky District
- Time zone: UTC+4:00

Isakiyevsky (Russian: Исакиевский) is a rural locality (a khutor) in Poklonovskoye Rural Settlement, Alexeyevsky District, Volgograd Oblast, Russia. The population was 271 as of 2010.

== Geography ==
Isakiyevsky is located 29 km north of Alexeyevskaya (the district's administrative centre) by road. Martynovsky is the nearest rural locality.
