= Reshetovsky =

Reshetovsky Решетовский
- Khutor
- Location within Volgograd Oblast Location within Russia
- Coordinates: 50°08′N 42°34′E
- Country: Russia
- Region: Volgograd Oblast
- District: Alexeyevsky District
- Time zone: UTC+4:00

Reshetovsky (Russian: Решетовский) is a rural locality (a khutor) in Sharashenskoye Rural Settlement, Alexeyevsky District, Volgograd Oblast, Russia. The population was 41 as of 2010.

== Geography ==
Reshetovsky is located 37 km southeast from Alexeyevskaya (the district's administrative centre) by road. Zakharovsky is the nearest rural locality.
