= Kudinovsky =

Kudinovsky Кудиновский
- Khutor
- Location within Volgograd Oblast Location within Russia
- Coordinates: 50°20′N 42°02′E
- Country: Russia
- Region: Volgograd Oblast
- District: Alexeyevsky District
- Time zone: UTC+4:00

Kudinovsky (Russian: Кудиновский) is a rural locality (a khutor) in Samolshinskoye Rural Settlement, Alexeyevsky District, Volgograd Oblast, Russia. The population was 11 in 2010.

== Geography ==
Kudinovsky is located 19 kilometres (12 mi) northwest of Alexeyevskaya (the district's administrative centre) by road. Samolshinsky is the nearest rural locality.
