= Sharashensky =

Sharashensky Шарашенский
- Khutor
- Location within Volgograd Oblast Location within Russia
- Coordinates: 50°11′N 42°41′E
- Country: Russia
- Region: Volgograd Oblast
- District: Alexeyevsky District
- Time zone: UTC+4:00

Sharashensky (Russian: Шарашенский) is a rural locality (a khutor) and the administrative center of Sharashenskoye Rural Settlement, Alexeyevsky District, Volgograd Oblast, Russia. The population was 760 as of 2010.

== Geography ==
Sharashensky is located on the right bank of the Kumylga River, 50 km southeast of Alexeyevskaya (the district's administrative centre) by road. Alimov-Lyubimovsky is the nearest rural locality.
