= Pimkinsky =

Pimkinsky Пимкинский
- Khutor
- Location within Volgograd Oblast Location within Russia
- Coordinates: 50°23′N 42°02′E
- Country: Russia
- Region: Volgograd Oblast
- District: Alexeyevsky District
- Time zone: UTC+4:00

Pimkinsky (Russian: Пимкинский) is a rural locality (a khutor) in Samolshinskoye Rural Settlement, Alexeyevsky District, Volgograd Oblast, Russia. The population was 138 as of 2010.

== Geography ==
Pimkinsky is located 18 km northwest of Alexeyevskaya (the district's administrative centre) by road. Samolshinsky is the nearest rural locality.
