= Yendovsky =

Yendovsky Ендовский
- Khutor
- Location within Volgograd Oblast Location within Russia
- Coordinates: 50°22′N 41°59′E
- Country: Russia
- Region: Volgograd Oblast
- District: Alexeyevsky District
- Time zone: UTC+4:00

Yendovsky (Russian: Ендовский) is a rural locality (a khutor) in Samolshinskoye Rural Settlement, Alexeyevsky District, Volgograd Oblast, Russia. The population was 10 as of 2010.

== Geography ==
Yendovsky is located on the right bank of the Khopyor River, 22 km northwest of Alexeyevskaya (the district's administrative centre) by road. Tishanskaya is the nearest rural locality.
