= Arepyev =

Arepyev Арепьев
- Khutor
- Location within Volgograd Oblast Location within Russia
- Coordinates: 50°05′N 41°58′E
- Country: Russia
- Region: Volgograd Oblast
- District: Alexeyevsky District
- Time zone: UTC+4:00

Arepyev (Russian: Арепьев) is a rural locality (a khutor) in Tryokhlozhinskoye Rural Settlement, Alexeyevsky District, Volgograd Oblast, Russia. The population was 56 as of 2010.

== Geography ==
Arepyev is located 43 km southwest of Alexeyevskaya (the district's administrative centre) by road. Trekhlozhinsky is the nearest rural locality.
