= 2008 Lunar New Year Cup =

Tournament details
- Host country: Hong Kong
- Dates: 22–25 January 2008
- Teams: 4
- Venue: 1 (in 1 host city)

Final positions
- Champions: Hong Kong (4th title)

Tournament statistics
- Matches played: 4
- Goals scored: 11 (2.75 per match)
- Top scorer(s): (Bosnia and Herzegovina) Mladen Bartolović (Hajduk Split) (North Macedonia) Goran Stankovski (Hong Kong League Selection) (2 goals)

The 2008 Lunar New Year Cup, officially known as Wing Lung Bank 2008 Lunar New Year Cup, is a football tournament held in Hong Kong on the first and fourth day of the Chinese New Year of the Year of Rat (22 January and 25 January 2008).

== Format ==
The two semi-finals for the four participating teams will be held on the first day of the Chinese New Year of Rat (7 February 2008). The winning teams will enter the final and the losing teams play the third-place playoff (Both matches on the fourth day of the Lunar New Year, i.e. 10 February 2008.) Draw in the semi-finals and third-place playoff would be settled by penalty shootout directly, that means no extra time would be played. For the final, a thirty-minute extra time would be played after a draw. A further draw would lead to the penalty shootout.

== Participating teams ==
- (Croatia) Hajduk Split
- Hong Kong League Selection (host)
- (Uruguay) Peñarol
- (South Korea) Ulsan Hyundai

== Squads ==
=== Hajduk Split ===
- General Manager: Ivica Šurjak
- Sports Director: Tomislav Erceg
- Coach: Robert Jarni
- Assistant Coach: Saša Glavaš
- Econom: Miro Čolak

No.	Pos.	Player	Date of birth (age)	Caps	Club
1	GK	(Croatia) Miro Varvodić	15 May 1989 (age 18)		(Croatia) Hajduk Split
3	DF	(Croatia) Goran Jozinović	27 August 1990 (age 17)		(Croatia) Hajduk Split
4	MF	(Bosnia and Herzegovina) Dario Damjanović	23 July 1981 (age 26)		(Croatia) Hajduk Split
5	DF	(Croatia) Jurica Buljat	12 September 1986 (age 21)		(Croatia) Hajduk Split
6	DF	(Croatia) Boris Živković	15 November 1975 (age 32)		(Croatia) Hajduk Split
7	MF	(Croatia) Mladen Pelaić	20 August 1983 (age 24)		(Croatia) Hajduk Split
10	MF	(Romania) Florin Cernat	10 March 1980 (age 27)		(Croatia) Hajduk Split
11	MF	(Croatia) Srđan Andrić	5 January 1980 (age 28)		(Croatia) Hajduk Split
12	GK	(Croatia) Vladimir Balić	29 September 1970 (age 37)		(Croatia) Hajduk Split
13	FW	(Croatia) Ante Rukavina	18 June 1986 (age 21)		(Croatia) Hajduk Split
14	MF	(Croatia) Marin Ljubičić	15 June 1988 (age 19)		(Croatia) Hajduk Split
15	MF	(Croatia) Drago Gabrić	7 September 1986 (age 21)		(Croatia) Hajduk Split
16	FW	(Bosnia and Herzegovina) Mladen Bartolović	10 April 1977 (age 30)		(Croatia) Hajduk Split
17	MF	(Croatia) Mate Maleš	11 March 1989 (age 18)		(Croatia) Hajduk Split
18	MF	(Bosnia and Herzegovina) Mirko Hrgović	5 February 1979 (age 28)		(Croatia) Hajduk Split
20	DF	(Croatia) Goran Sablić	4 August 1979 (age 28)		(Croatia) Hajduk Split
22	DF	(Croatia) Mario Maloča	4 May 1989 (age 18)		(Croatia) Hajduk Split
23	DF	(Croatia) Igor Tudor (captain)	16 April 1978 (age 29)		(Croatia) Hajduk Split
24	MF	(Croatia) Mario Tičinović	20 August 1991 (age 16)		(Croatia) Hajduk Split
25	GK	(Croatia) Božidar Radošević	4 April 1989 (age 18)		(Croatia) Hajduk Split
26	MF	(Croatia) Goran Rubil	9 March 1981 (age 26)		(Croatia) Hajduk Split
29	FW	(Latvia) Māris Verpakovskis	15 October 1979 (age 28)		(Croatia) Hajduk Split
30	FW	(Croatia) Tomislav Bušić	2 February 1986 (age 22)		(Croatia) Hajduk Split
	MF	(Croatia) Siniša Linić	23 August 1982 (age 25)		(Croatia) Hajduk Split

=== Hong Kong League Selection ===
- Team Managers: Brian H T Leung, Lo Kit Sing, Chow Man Leung
- Administrative Manager: Tsang Wai Chung, Lee Yun Wah
- Coach: Jose Luis
- Coach Assistant: Rambo Jose Ricardo
- Assistant Coach: Lo Kai Wah, Lee Kin Wo
- Fitness Coach: Chan Hiu Ming
- Goalkeeper Coach: Liu Chun Fai
- Physio: Lui Yat Hong
- Team Assistant: Kwan Kon Sang

No.	Pos.	Player	Date of birth (age)	Caps	Club
1	GK	(Brazil) Luciano	10 April 1974 (age 33)		(Hong Kong) Eastern
2	DF	(Hong Kong) Lee Chi Ho	16 November 1982 (age 25)		(Hong Kong) South China
3	MF	(Hong Kong) Gerard Ambassa Guy	21 September 1978 (age 29)		(Hong Kong) Happy Valley
4	MF	(Ghana) Wisdom Fofo Agbo	25 June 1979 (age 28)		(Hong Kong) Bulova Rangers
5	MF	(Brazil) Edgar Aldrighi Junior	30 March 1974 (age 33)		(Hong Kong) Wofoo Tai Po
6	DF	(Nigeria) Festus Baise	11 April 1980 (age 27)		(Hong Kong) Citizen
7	FW	(North Macedonia) Goran Stankovski	20 November 1976 (age 31)		(Hong Kong) Kitchee
9	FW	(China) Wang Xuanhong	24 July 1989 (age 18)		(Hong Kong) Citizen
11	MF	(China) Li Haiqiang (captain)	3 May 1977 (age 30)		(Hong Kong) South China
12	MF	(Brazil) Beto	28 May 1983 (age 24)		(Hong Kong) Convoy Sun Hei
15	DF	(Hong Kong) Chan Wai Ho	24 April 1982 (age 25)		(Hong Kong) South China
17	GK	(Brazil) Fábio Oliveira	12 October 1975 (age 32)		(Hong Kong) Happy Valley
18	FW	(Hong Kong) Chan Siu Ki	14 July 1985 (age 22)		(Hong Kong) Kitchee
20	DF	(Hong Kong) Poon Yiu Cheuk	19 September 1977 (age 30)		(Hong Kong) Happy Valley
21	MF	(Hong Kong) Man Pei Tak	16 February 1982 (age 25)		(Hong Kong) South China
22	FW	(Brazil) Giovane	25 November 1982 (age 25)		(Hong Kong) Convoy Sun Hei
25	DF	(Togo) Cris	9 October 1980 (age 27)		(Hong Kong) South China
26	MF	(Brazil) Itaparica	8 July 1980 (age 27)		(Hong Kong) South China
27	FW	(Brazil) Maxwell	23 April 1979 (age 28)		(Hong Kong) South China
28	DF	(Brazil) Sidrailson	26 February 1982 (age 25)		(Hong Kong) South China
29	FW	(Brazil) Tales Schutz	22 August 1981 (age 26)		(Hong Kong) South China
30	FW	(Brazil) Detinho	11 September 1973 (age 34)		(Hong Kong) South China

=== Peñarol ===
- Coordinator: Juan Pedro Damiani
- Coach: Gustavo Matosas
- Manager: Jorge López

No.	Pos.	Player	Date of birth (age)	Caps	Club
1	GK	(Uruguay) Damián Frascarelli	2 June 1985 (age 22)		(Uruguay) Peñarol
2	DF	(Argentina) Matías Manrique	1 November 1980 (age 27)		(Uruguay) Peñarol
5	MF	(Uruguay) Mario Álvarez	9 October 1981 (age 26)		(Uruguay) Peñarol
6	DF	(Uruguay) Darío Rodríguez (captain)	7 September 1974 (age 33)		(Uruguay) Peñarol
7	FW	(Uruguay) José María Franco	28 September 1978 (age 29)		(Uruguay) Peñarol
8	FW	(Uruguay) Antonio Pacheco	11 April 1976 (age 31)		(Uruguay) Peñarol
9	FW	(Uruguay) Fernando Correa	6 January 1974 (age 33)		(Uruguay) Peñarol
10	FW	(Uruguay) Rubén Olivera	4 May 1983 (age 24)		(Uruguay) Peñarol
11	FW	(Uruguay) Fabián Estoyanoff	27 September 1982 (age 25)		(Uruguay) Peñarol
12	GK	(Uruguay) Guillermo Reyes	10 July 1986 (age 21)		(Uruguay) Peñarol
14	DF	(Uruguay) Alejandro González	23 March 1988 (age 19)		(Uruguay) Peñarol
15	MF	(Uruguay) Marcel Román	7 February 1988 (age 19)		(Uruguay) Peñarol
16	MF	(Uruguay) Diego Rodríguez	8 August 1986 (age 21)		(Uruguay) Peñarol
17	MF	(Uruguay) Carlos Díaz	4 February 1979 (age 28)		(Uruguay) Peñarol
18	MF	(Uruguay) Omar Pérez	20 September 1976 (age 31)		(Uruguay) Peñarol
19	FW	(Uruguay) Sergio Pérez	26 May 1988 (age 19)		(Uruguay) Peñarol
20	FW	(Uruguay) Carlos Bueno	10 May 1980 (age 27)		(Uruguay) Peñarol
23	MF	(Uruguay) Julio Mozzo	20 April 1981 (age 26)		(Uruguay) Peñarol
24	MF	(Uruguay) Maximiliano Bajter	1 March 1986 (age 21)		(Uruguay) Peñarol
31	DF	(Uruguay) Alvaro Arias	3 October 1988 (age 19)		(Uruguay) Peñarol

=== Ulsan Hyundai ===
- Vice President: Kim Hyung-yong
- Coach: Kim Jung-nam
- Team Manager: Lee Young-woo

No.	Pos.	Player	Date of birth (age)	Caps	Club
1	GK	(South Korea) Kim Young-kwang	28 June 1983 (age 24)		(South Korea) Ulsan Hyundai
4	DF	(South Korea) Lee Yoon-sup	30 July 1979 (age 28)		(South Korea) Ulsan Hyundai
5	DF	(South Korea) Yoo Kyoung-youl	15 August 1978 (age 29)		(South Korea) Ulsan Hyundai
6	DF	(South Korea) Park Dong-hyuk (captain)	18 April 1979 (age 28)		(South Korea) Ulsan Hyundai
7	MF	(Brazil) Brasília	28 July 1977 (age 30)		(South Korea) Ulsan Hyundai
8	MF	(South Korea) Lee Sang-ho	9 May 1987 (age 20)		(South Korea) Ulsan Hyundai
10	FW	(Brazil) Luizinho	25 June 1985 (age 22)		(South Korea) Ulsan Hyundai
13	MF	(South Korea) Hyun Young-min	25 December 1979 (age 28)		(South Korea) Ulsan Hyundai
14	MF	(South Korea) You Ho-jun	14 January 1985 (age 23)		(South Korea) Ulsan Hyundai
15	MF	(South Korea) Kim Young-sam	4 April 1982 (age 25)		(South Korea) Ulsan Hyundai
16	MF	(South Korea) Oh Jang-eun	24 July 1985 (age 22)		(South Korea) Ulsan Hyundai
19	FW	(South Korea) Lee Jin-ho	3 September 1984 (age 23)		(South Korea) Ulsan Hyundai
20	DF	(South Korea) Lee Sang-don	12 August 1985 (age 22)		(South Korea) Ulsan Hyundai
22	FW	(South Korea) Woo Sung-yong	18 August 1973 (age 34)		(South Korea) Ulsan Hyundai
24	DF	(South Korea) Seo Deok-kyu	22 October 1978 (age 29)		(South Korea) Ulsan Hyundai
25	MF	(South Korea) Kim Ji-min	27 November 1984 (age 23)		(South Korea) Ulsan Hyundai
31	GK	(South Korea) Choi Moo-lim	15 April 1979 (age 29)		(South Korea) Ulsan Hyundai
33	DF	(South Korea) Lee Se-hwan	21 April 1986 (age 21)		(South Korea) Ulsan Hyundai
36	FW	(South Korea) Lee Jin-woo	3 September 1982 (age 25)		(South Korea) Ulsan Hyundai
	DF	(South Korea) Park Byung-gyu	1 March 1982 (age 25)		(South Korea) Ulsan Hyundai

== Results ==
All times given in Hong Kong Time (UTC+8).

=== Semi-finals ===
22 January 2008
15:00

Hong Kong League Selection	2–1	(Uruguay) Peñarol
Schutz 36'; Lee (yellow card) 42'; Poon (yellow card) 43'; Chan 59'	(in chinese)	Estoyanoff (yellow card) 9'; Rodríguez 10'; Pérez (yellow card) 51'; Rodríguez (yellow card) 30' (yellow-red card) 56'; Bueno (yellow card) 76' (yellow-red card) 78'; Arias (yellow card) 84'

Hong Kong Stadium, Hong Kong
Attendance: 9,279
Referee: Wong Po On

22 January 2008
17:30

Hajduk Split (Croatia)	2–1	(South Korea) Ulsan Hyundai
Bartolović 38', 63'; Damjanović (yellow card) 45'; Živković (yellow card) 79'; Andrić (red card) 79'; Cernat (yellow card) 82'; Hrgović (yellow card) 90'	(in chinese)	Hyun Young-min (yellow card) 9'; Lee Jin-ho 20'

Hong Kong Stadium, Hong Kong
Attendance: 9,279
Referee: Liu Kwok Man

=== Third place match ===
25 January 2008
15:00

Peñarol (Uruguay)	1–1	(South Korea) Ulsan Hyundai
Franco 41'; Mozzo (yellow card) 71'	(in chinese)	Brasília 45'; Lee Sang-ho (yellow card) 90'
Penalties
Mozzo (penalty scored); Corrêa (penalty scored); Román (penalty scored); Arias (penalty scored)	4–3	(penalty missed) Woo Sung-yong; (penalty scored) Oh Jang-eun; (penalty scored) Hyun Young-min; (penalty scored) Brasília; (penalty missed) Kim Ji-min

Hong Kong Stadium, Hong Kong
Attendance: 12,375

=== Final ===
25 January 2008
17:30

Hong Kong League Selection	2–1	(Croatia) Hajduk Split
Baise (yellow card) 38'; Maxwell (yellow card) 40'; Stankovski 61', 85'	(in chinese)	Cernat 15'; Gabrić (yellow card) 18'; Damjanović (yellow card) 69'

Hong Kong Stadium, Hong Kong
Attendance: 12,375

== Bracket ==
Semi-finals
22 January 2008 – Hong Kong
Hong Kong League Selection	2
(Uruguay) Peñarol	1
22 January 2008 – Hong Kong
(Croatia) Hajduk Split	2
(South Korea) Ulsan Hyundai	1

Final
25 January 2008 – Hong Kong
Hong Kong League Selection	2
(Croatia) Hajduk Split	1
Third place
25 January 2008 - Hong Kong
(Uruguay) Peñarol (pen.)	1 (5)
(South Korea) Ulsan Hyundai	1 (4)

2008 Carlsberg Cup Champions
Hong Kong League Selection
Fourth Title

== Top scorers ==
2 goals

- (Bosnia and Herzegovina) Mladen Bartolović (Hajduk Split|)
- (North Macedonia) Goran Stankovski (Hong Kong League Selection)

1 goal

- (Romania) Florin Cernat (Hajduk Split|)
- (Brazil) Tales Schutz (Hong Kong League Selection)
- Chan Siu Ki (Hong Kong League Selection)
- (Uruguay) Darío Rodríguez (Peñarol)
- (Uruguay) José María Franco (Peñarol)
- (South Korea) Lee Jin-ho (Ulsan Hyundai)
- (Brazil) Brasília (Ulsan Hyundai)

== Ticketing ==
- Tickets are divided into 5 prices categories: $100(Senior Citizens & Full Time Students ONLY), $150, $200, $280 and $380.

== Trivia ==
- Audience seating in Section 116 (Hong Kong Fans Special Area) are each given a cheering T-shirt.
- All audience who have bought a ticket are given a pair of coupletes.

== See also ==
- Hong Kong Football Association
- Hong Kong First Division League
