= Sidorovka, Volgograd Oblast =

Sidorovka Сидоровка
- Khutor
- Location within Volgograd Oblast Location within Russia
- Coordinates: 50°03′N 42°24′E
- Country: Russia
- Region: Volgograd Oblast
- District: Alexeyevsky District
- Time zone: UTC+4:00

Sidorovka (Russian: Сидоровка) is a rural locality (a khutor) in Arzhanovskoye Rural Settlement, Alexeyevsky District, Volgograd Oblast, Russia. The population was 6 as of 2010.

== Geography ==
Sidorovka is located on the right bank of the Khopyor River, 42 km southeast of Alexeyevskaya (the district's administrative centre) by road. Pokruchinsky is the nearest rural locality.
