= Nesterovsky, Volgograd Oblast =

Nesterovsky Нестеровский
- Khutor
- Location within Volgograd Oblast Location within Russia
- Coordinates: 50°10′N 42°01′E
- Country: Russia
- Region: Volgograd Oblast
- District: Alexeyevsky District
- Time zone: UTC+4:00

Nesterovsky (Russian: Нестеровский) is a rural locality (a khutor) in Rechenskoye Rural Settlement, Alexeyevsky District, Volgograd Oblast, Russia. The population was 143 as of 2010.

== Geography ==
Nesterovsky is located on the left bank of the Akishevka River, 30 km southwest of Alexeyevskaya (the district's administrative centre) by road. Rechensky is the nearest rural locality.
