= Poklonovsky =

Poklonovsky Поклоновский
- Khutor
- Location within Volgograd Oblast Location within Russia
- Coordinates: 50°24′N 42°08′E
- Country: Russia
- Region: Volgograd Oblast
- District: Alexeyevsky District
- Time zone: UTC+4:00

Poklonovsky (Russian: Поклоновский) is a rural locality (a khutor) and the administrative center of Poklonovskoye Rural Settlement, Alexeyevsky District, Volgograd Oblast, Russia. The population was 406 as of 2010.

== Geography ==
Poklonovsky is located 20 km north of Alexeyevskaya (the district's administrative centre) by road. Pavlovsky is the nearest rural locality.
