= Mitkin, Volgograd Oblast =

Mitkin Митькин
- Khutor
- Location within Volgograd Oblast Location within Russia
- Coordinates: 50°04′N 42°05′E
- Country: Russia
- Region: Volgograd Oblast
- District: Alexeyevsky District
- Time zone: UTC+4:00

Mitkin (Russian: Митькин) is a rural locality (a khutor) in Tryokhlozhinskoye Rural Settlement, Alexeyevsky District, Volgograd Oblast, Russia. The population was 2 as of 2010.

== Geography ==
Mitkin is located 45 km southwest of Alexeyevskaya (the district's administrative centre) by road. Trekhlozhinsky is the nearest rural locality.
