= Zotovskaya =

Zotovskaya Зотовская
- Stanitsa
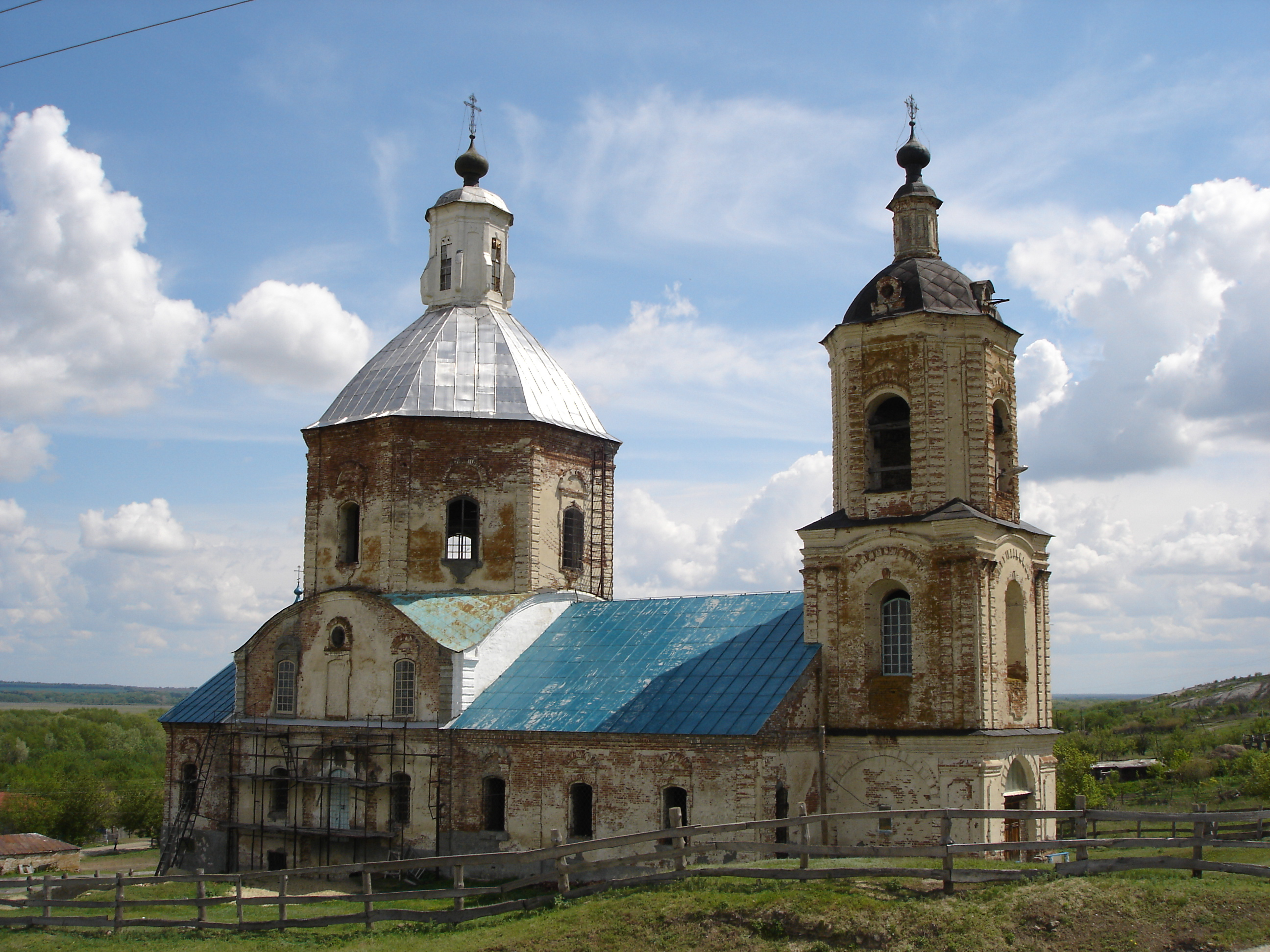

- Location within Volgograd Oblast Location within Russia
- Coordinates: 50°04′N 42°24′E
- Country: Russia
- Region: Volgograd Oblast
- District: Alexeyevsky District
- Time zone: UTC+4:00

Zotovskaya (Russian: Зотовская) is a rural locality (a stanitsa) in Arzhanovskoye Rural Settlement, Alexeyevsky District, Volgograd Oblast, Russia. The population was 76 as of 2010.

== Geography ==
Zotovskaya is located on the right bank of the Khopyor River, 41 km southeast of Alexeyevskaya (the district's administrative centre) by road. Sidorovka is the nearest rural locality.
