= Kochkarinsky =

Kochkarinsky Кочкаринский
- Khutor
- Location within Volgograd Oblast Location within Russia
- Coordinates: 50°21′N 42°14′E
- Country: Russia
- Region: Volgograd Oblast
- District: Alexeyevsky District
- Time zone: UTC+4:00

Kochkarinsky (Russian: Кочкаринский) is a rural locality (a khutor) in Yaminskoye Rural Settlement, Alexeyevsky District, Volgograd Oblast, Russia. The population was 175 as of 2010.

== Geography ==
Kochkarinsky is located on the left bank of the Buzuluk River, 10 km northeast of Alexeyevskaya (the district's administrative centre) by road. Bolshoy Babinsky is the nearest rural locality.
