= Skulyabinsky =

Skulyabinsky Скулябинский
- Khutor
- Location within Volgograd Oblast Location within Russia
- Coordinates: 50°01′N 42°08′E
- Country: Russia
- Region: Volgograd Oblast
- District: Alexeyevsky District
- Time zone: UTC+4:00

Skulyabinsky (Russian: Скулябинский) is a rural locality (a khutor) in Tryokhlozhinskoye Rural Settlement, Alexeyevsky District, Volgograd Oblast, Russia. The population was 138 as of 2010.

== Geography ==
Skulyabinsky is located 51 km south of Alexeyevskaya (the district's administrative centre) by road. Olkhovsky is the nearest rural locality.
