= Stezhensky =

Stezhensky Стеженский
- Khutor
- Location within Volgograd Oblast Location within Russia
- Coordinates: 50°17′N 42°08′E
- Country: Russia
- Region: Volgograd Oblast
- District: Alexeyevsky District
- Time zone: UTC+4:00

Stezhensky (Russian: Стеженский) is a rural locality (a khutor) and the administrative center of Stezhenskoye Rural Settlement, Alexeyevsky District, Volgograd Oblast, Russia. The population was 370 as of 2010.

== Geography ==
Stezhensky is located 4 km west of Alexeyevskaya (the district's administrative centre) by road. Pomalinsky is the nearest rural locality.
