= Plyos, Volgograd Oblast =

Plyos Плёс
- Khutor
- Location within Volgograd Oblast Location within Russia
- Coordinates: 50°02′N 42°25′E
- Country: Russia
- Region: Volgograd Oblast
- District: Alexeyevsky District
- Time zone: UTC+4:00

Plyos (Russian: Плёс) is a rural locality (a khutor) in Arzhanovskoye Rural Settlement, Alexeyevsky District, Volgograd Oblast, Russia. The population was 12 as of 2010.

== Geography ==
Plyos is located on the right bank of the Khopyor River, 44 km southeast of Alexeyevskaya (the district's administrative centre) by road. Zotovskaya is the nearest rural locality.
