= Zakharovsky, Alexeyevsky District, Volgograd Oblast =

Zakharovsky Захаровский
- Khutor
- Location within Volgograd Oblast Location within Russia
- Coordinates: 50°08′N 42°40′E
- Country: Russia
- Region: Volgograd Oblast
- District: Alexeyevsky District
- Time zone: UTC+4:00

Zakharovsky (Russian: Захаровский) is a rural locality (a khutor) in Sharashenskoye Rural Settlement, Alexeyevsky District, Volgograd Oblast, Russia. The population was 48 as of 2010.

== Geography ==
Zakharovsky is located on the right bank of the Kumylga River, 45 km southeast of Alexeyevskaya (the district's administrative centre) by road. Sharashensky is the nearest rural locality.
