= Pomalinsky =

Pomalinsky Помалинский
- Khutor
- Location within Volgograd Oblast Location within Russia
- Coordinates: 50°18′N 42°08′E
- Country: Russia
- Region: Volgograd Oblast
- District: Alexeyevsky District
- Time zone: UTC+4:00

Pomalinsky (Russian: Помалинский) is a rural locality (a khutor) in Stezhenskoye Rural Settlement, Alexeyevsky District, Volgograd Oblast, Russia. The population was 196 as of 2010.

== Geography ==
Pomalinsky is located 5 km northwest of Alexeyevskaya (the district's administrative centre) by road. Stezhensky is the nearest rural locality.
