= Lunyakinsky =

Lunyakinsky Лунякинский
- Khutor
- Location within Volgograd Oblast Location within Russia
- Coordinates: 50°11′N 42°05′E
- Country: Russia
- Region: Volgograd Oblast
- District: Alexeyevsky District
- Time zone: UTC+4:00

Lunyakinsky (Russian: Лунякинский) is a rural locality (a khutor) in Rechenskoye Rural Settlement, Alexeyevsky District, Volgograd Oblast, Russia. The population was 31 as of 2010.

== Geography ==
Lunyakinsky is located on the right bank of the Akishevka River, 26 km southwest of Alexeyevskaya (the district's administrative centre) by road. Ust-Buzulukskaya is the nearest rural locality.
