= Ryabovsky =

Ryabovsky Рябовский
- Khutor
- Location within Volgograd Oblast Location within Russia
- Coordinates: 50°00′N 41°53′E
- Country: Russia
- Region: Volgograd Oblast
- District: Alexeyevsky District
- Time zone: UTC+4:00

Ryabovsky (Russian: Рябовский) is a rural locality (a khutor) and the administrative center of Ryabovskoye Rural Settlement, Alexeyevsky District, Volgograd Oblast, Russia. The population was 871 as of 2010.

== Geography ==
Ryabovsky is located 54 km southwest from Alexeyevskaya (the district's administrative centre) by road. Stanovsky is the nearest rural locality.
