= Kolesov (surname) =

Kolesov (Russian: Колесов) feminine: Kolesova, from колесо meaning wheel, is a Russian surname. It may refer to:

- Aleksandr Kolesov (1922–1994), Soviet military officer
- Anatoly Kolesov (1938–2012), Russian wrestler and coach
- Anatoly Kolesov (cyclist) (born 1931), Soviet cyclist
- Fyodor Kolesov (1891-1940), Russian Bolshevik leader, active in Turkestan
- Gavril Kolesov (born 1979), Russian draughts player
- Gordey Kolesov (born 2008), the winner of the 2015 Talent Show
- Nikolai Kolesov (1956–1998), Russian football player
- Oleh Kolesov (born 1969), Ukrainian football coach and a former goalkeeper
- Yelena Kolesova (1920–1942), Spetnaz partisan unit commander during World War II
