= Kunming attack =

Kunming attack may refer to:

- 2008 Kunming bus bombings
- 2014 Kunming attack
