= Aleksandr Kolesov =

Soviet army officer (1922–1994)

Alexander Andreyevich Kolesov
- Александр Андреевич Колесов
- Born: 1 February 1922; Sukhovsky, Alexeyevsky District, Volgograd Oblast
- Died: 31 July 1994 (aged 72); Moscow
- Military career
- Allegiance: Soviet Union
- Branch: Airborne
- Service years: 1941–1946; 1949–1974
- Rank: Colonel
- Units: 8th Guards Airborne Regiment, 3rd Guards Airborne Division
- Conflicts: World War II
- Awards: Hero of the Soviet Union; Order of Lenin; Order of the Patriotic War 1st class Order of the Badge of Honour

Alexander Andreyevich Kolesov (Russian: Александр Андреевич Колесов; 1 February 1922 – 31 July 1994) was a Soviet officer and Hero of the Soviet Union. Kolesov was awarded the title for his actions during the Battle of the Dnieper. Due to the wounds he suffered during the fighting, Kolesov was not able to hold another combat post during the war. However, he returned to the Army postwar and eventually retired as a colonel. He later worked as a quality controller within the Soviet military equipment procurement organization.

== Early life ==
Kolesov was born on 1 February 1922 in Sukhovsky, Alexeyevsky District, Volgograd Oblast. In 1934, he moved to the village of Ust-Buzulukskaya in the same district. After finishing school in 1939, he worked as a radio operator and as an assistant projectionist in the regional Palace of Culture at Kruglovka in Nekhayevsky District.

== World War II ==
Kolesov was drafted in May 1941. He was sent to the 381st Airfield Services Battalion in the Kiev Military District. Kolesov served with the 346th Separate Reconnaissance Company in the 253rd Rifle Division from October 1941. Fighting on the Southwestern Front and the Southern Front (Soviet Union), Kolesov fought in the Donbass-Rostov Strategic Defensive Operation and was slightly wounded twice. In January 1942, he was sent to an airborne course and graduated in May 1942. Kolesov was then assigned to the 3rd Guards Airborne Division, with which he fought during the Demyansk Pocket operations, the Battle of Kursk and the Battle of Kiev.

In October 1943, Kolesov commanded a platoon of anti-tank guns in the 8th Guards Airborne Regiment of the 3rd Guards Airborne Division. During the Battle of the Dnieper on 5 October, he destroyed two German self-propelled guns with anti-tank grenades, causing a German counterattack to be repulsed. On 23 December, he was severely wounded and sent to hospital. On 10 January 1944, Kolesov was awarded the title Hero of the Soviet Union and the Order of Lenin.

He was released from the hospital in February 1944. He was then on duty with the assistant commandant of Khimki from April to October. Kolesov then was on duty with the assistant commandant of Dzerzhinsk. In 1945, he joined the Communist Party of the Soviet Union.

== Postwar ==
In June 1946 Kolesov was discharged with the rank of senior lieutenant. Between 1946 and 1947, he worked as the chief of the personnel department for the Kruglovskogo Executive Committee in the Volgograd Oblast. He then became the head of the personnel department of the Moscow transport hub, part of the operational office of the Ministry of Railways. In May 1949 he rejoined the army. Kolesov became a platoon commander in a construction battalion. From 1950, he served as an officer in the Main Military Construction Headquarters. He graduated from the Central Correspondence Mounting College in 1959. In 1964 he transferred to the Management of Materials and Funds department in the Ministry of Defence. He was awarded the Order of the Badge of Honour on 22 February 1968. Kolesov retired as a colonel in April 1974. Between February and April 1976, he worked as a technician in the Soviet military equipment quality control organization. He was awarded the Order of the Patriotic War 1st class in 1985 on the 40th anniversary of the end of World War II. He lived in Moscow and died on 31 July 1994. Kolesov was buried in the Pyatnitskoye cemetery.
