= Ust-Buzulukskaya =

Ust-Buzulukskaya Усть-Бузулукская
- Stanitsa
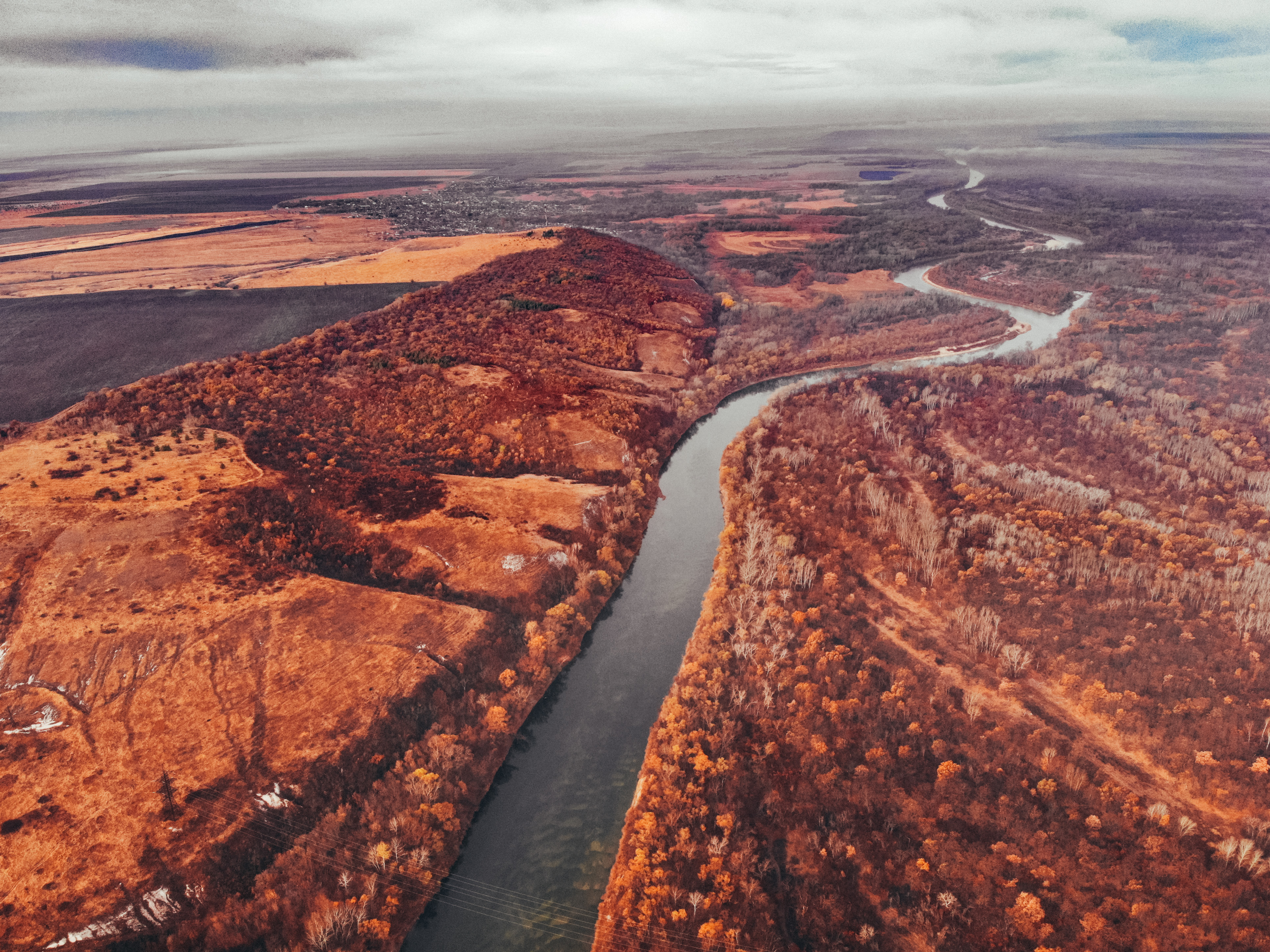
- Autumn on the Khopër Trail. Panoramic view of the floodplain of the Khopër and Buzuluk rivers.

- Location within Volgograd Oblast Location within Russia
- Coordinates: 50°10′N 42°09′E
- Country: Russia
- Region: Volgograd Oblast
- District: Alexeyevsky District
- Time zone: UTC+4:00

Ust-Buzulukskaya (Russian: Усть-Бузулукская) is a rural locality (a stanitsa) and the administrative center of Ust-Buzulukskoye Rural Settlement, Alexeyevsky District, Volgograd Oblast, Russia. The population was 2,364 as of 2010. There are 32 streets.

== Geography ==
Ust-Buzulukskaya is located on the right bank of the Khopyor River, 20 km south of Alexeyevskaya (the district's administrative centre) by road. Lunyakinsky is the nearest rural locality.
