= Sukhovsky =

Sukhovsky Суховский
- Khutor
- Location within Volgograd Oblast Location within Russia
- Coordinates: 50°08′N 41°57′E
- Country: Russia
- Region: Volgograd Oblast
- District: Alexeyevsky District
- Time zone: UTC+4:00

Sukhovsky (Russian: Суховский) is a rural locality (a khutor) in Rechenskoye Rural Settlement, Alexeyevsky District, Volgograd Oblast, Russia. The population was 48 as of 2010.

== Geography ==
Sukhovsky is located 36 km southwest of Alexeyevskaya (the district's administrative centre) by road. Rechensky is the nearest rural locality.
