= Arzhanovskaya =

Arzhanovskaya Аржановская
- Stanitsa
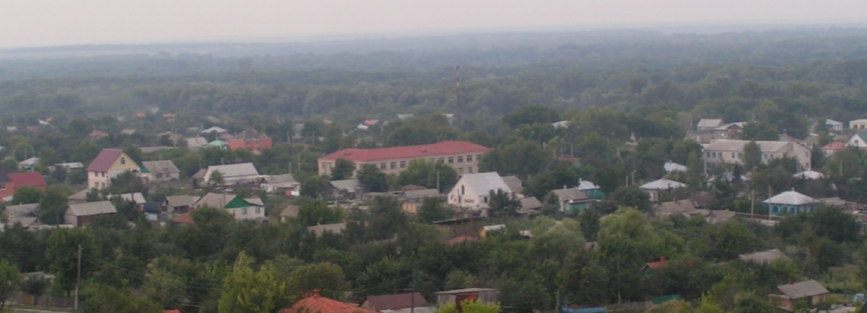
- View of Arzhanovskaya station

- Location within Volgograd Oblast Location within Russia
- Coordinates: 50°06′N 42°21′E
- Country: Russia
- Region: Volgograd Oblast
- District: Alexeyevsky District
- Time zone: UTC+4:00

Arzhanovskaya (Russian: Аржановская) is a rural locality (a stanitsa) and the administrative center of Arzhanovskoye Rural Settlement, Alexeyevsky District, Volgograd Oblast, Russia. The population was 772 as of 2010.

== Geography ==
Arzhanovskaya is located on the plain between Khopyor River and hills, 36 km southeast of Alexeyevskaya (the district's administrative centre) by road. Zotovskaya is the nearest rural locality.
