= Krasny Oktyabr, Alexeyevsky District, Volgograd Oblast =

Krasny Oktyabr Красный Октябрь
- Settlement
- Location within Volgograd Oblast Location within Russia
- Coordinates: 50°19′N 42°31′E
- Country: Russia
- Region: Volgograd Oblast
- District: Alexeyevsky District
- Time zone: UTC+4:00

Krasny Oktyabr (Russian: Красный Октябрь) is a rural locality (a settlement) and the administrative center of Krasnooktyabrskoye Rural Settlement, Alexeyevsky District, Volgograd Oblast, Russia. The population was 895 as of 2010.

== Geography ==
The village is located 24 km north from Alexeyevskaya.
