= 2008 Shenzhen anti-police riot =

Riot in China

The Shenzhen anti-police riot began in Shenzhen, People's Republic of China, on November 7, 2008, when a policeman threw a walkie talkie at a speeding motorcyclist, causing the driver to lose control of his bike. The driver then crashed into a lamp post and died a few hours later. The biker's relatives began gathering people and started a riot against the local police station that grew to involve hundreds of people and thousands of bystanders.

== See also ==
- 2008 Guizhou riot
- Shishou incident
