= Weng'an County =

Weng'an County 瓮安县 Wengan
- County
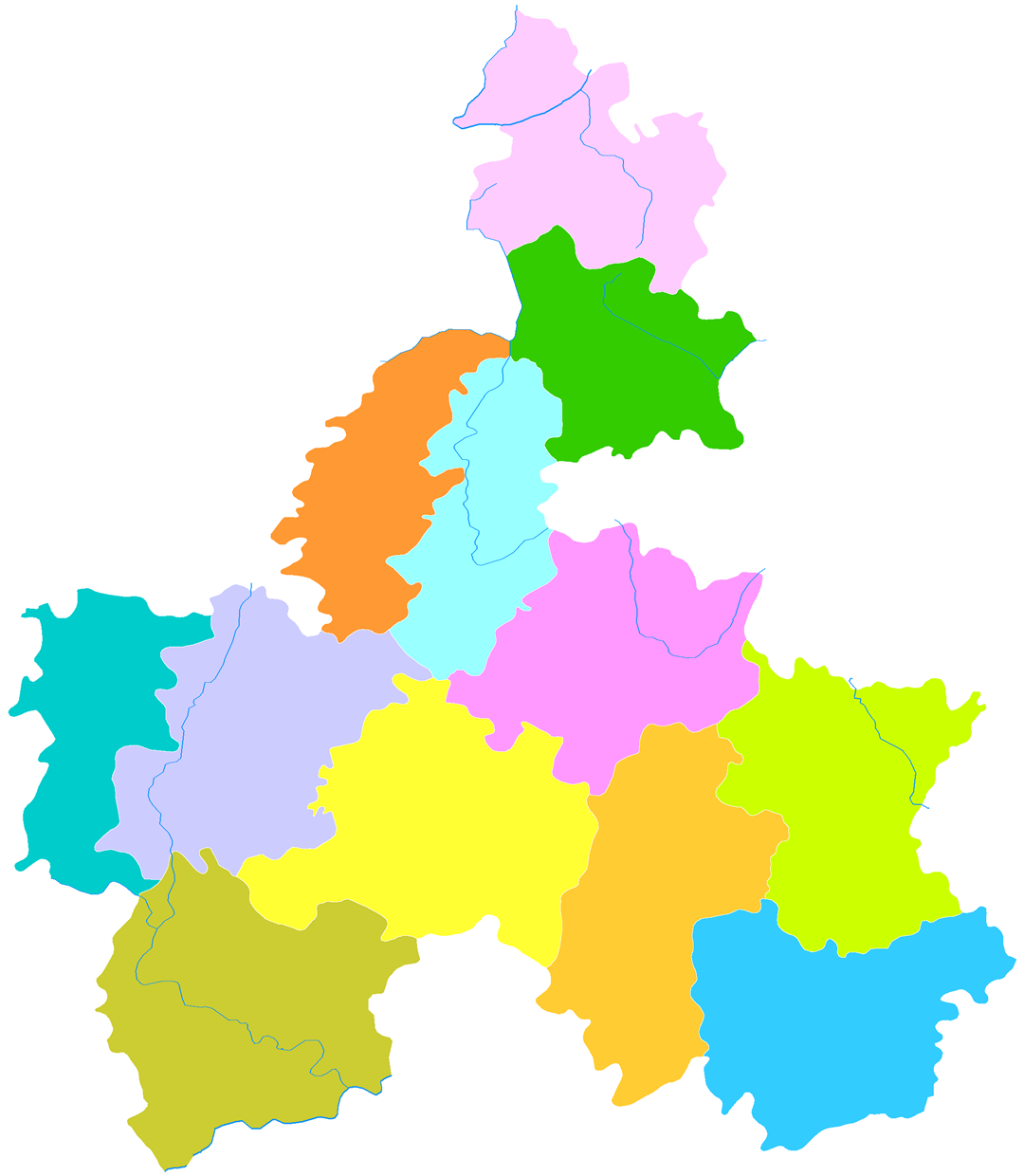
- Weng'an is the northernmost division in this map of Qiannan

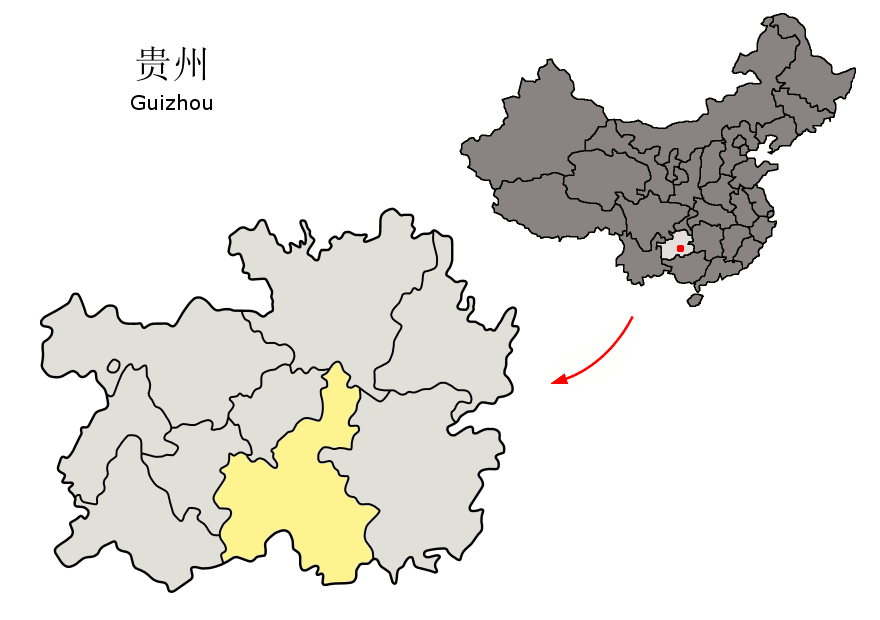
- Qiannan in Guizhou
- Coordinates (Weng'an County government): 27°04′42″N 107°28′15″E
- Country: China
- Province: Guizhou
- Autonomous prefecture: Qiannan
- County seat: Yongyang

Area
  - Total: 1,973.8 km^{2} (762.1 sq mi)

Population (2010)
  - Total: 380,458
  - Density: 192.75/km^{2} (499.23/sq mi)
- Time zone: UTC+8 (China Standard)
- Postal code: 550400
- Area code: 0854
- Website: www.wengan.gov.cn

Weng'an County (simplified Chinese: 瓮安县; traditional Chinese: 甕安縣; pinyin: Wèng'ān Xiàn) is a county in Qiannan Buyei and Miao Autonomous Prefecture, Guizhou, China.

Weng'an has an area of 1973.8 square kilometers and a population of 460,600 as of 2003.

On June 28, 2008, a riot happened here.

== Administrative divisions ==
Weng'an County is divided into 2 subdistricts, 10 towns and 1 township:

subdistricts

- Yongyang 雍阳街道
- Wengshui 瓮水街道

towns

- Pingdingying 平定营镇
- Houchang 猴场镇
- Zhongping 中坪镇
- Jianzhong 建中镇
- Yonghe 永和镇
- Zhucang 珠藏镇
- Yushan 玉山镇
- Tianwen 天文镇
- Yinzhan 银盏镇
- Jiangjiehe 江界河镇

township

- Languan 岚关乡

== Gallery ==
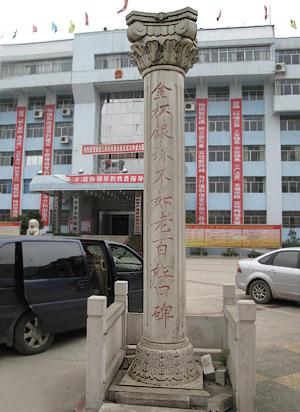
Stone tablet in front of Weng'an government building, Guizhou

== Climate ==
Climate data for Weng'an, elevation 1,129 m (3,704 ft), (1991–2020 normals, extremes 1981–present)
Month	Jan	Feb	Mar	Apr	May	Jun	Jul	Aug	Sep	Oct	Nov	Dec	Year
Record high °C (°F)	22.0 (71.6)	29.3 (84.7)	31.8 (89.2)	32.0 (89.6)	34.4 (93.9)	31.9 (89.4)	34.4 (93.9)	33.2 (91.8)	33.2 (91.8)	29.7 (85.5)	26.1 (79.0)	22.7 (72.9)	34.4 (93.9)
Mean daily maximum °C (°F)	6.1 (43.0)	9.3 (48.7)	13.9 (57.0)	19.5 (67.1)	22.9 (73.2)	25.1 (77.2)	27.6 (81.7)	27.7 (81.9)	24.3 (75.7)	18.8 (65.8)	14.5 (58.1)	8.7 (47.7)	18.2 (64.8)
Daily mean °C (°F)	3.0 (37.4)	5.6 (42.1)	9.5 (49.1)	14.7 (58.5)	18.4 (65.1)	21.2 (70.2)	23.2 (73.8)	22.7 (72.9)	19.6 (67.3)	14.8 (58.6)	10.4 (50.7)	5.1 (41.2)	14.0 (57.2)
Mean daily minimum °C (°F)	1.1 (34.0)	3.1 (37.6)	6.7 (44.1)	11.6 (52.9)	15.3 (59.5)	18.5 (65.3)	20.1 (68.2)	19.4 (66.9)	16.4 (61.5)	12.2 (54.0)	7.6 (45.7)	2.8 (37.0)	11.2 (52.2)
Record low °C (°F)	−7.1 (19.2)	−7.1 (19.2)	−5.1 (22.8)	1.1 (34.0)	4.5 (40.1)	11.6 (52.9)	11.2 (52.2)	11.8 (53.2)	6.5 (43.7)	2.1 (35.8)	−4.4 (24.1)	−7.3 (18.9)	−7.3 (18.9)
Average precipitation mm (inches)	32.0 (1.26)	31.9 (1.26)	53.7 (2.11)	102.2 (4.02)	157.6 (6.20)	188.2 (7.41)	190.4 (7.50)	125.0 (4.92)	90.1 (3.55)	92.5 (3.64)	45.4 (1.79)	27.5 (1.08)	1,136.5 (44.74)
Average precipitation days (≥ 0.1 mm)	16.9	14.9	18.7	17.7	17.9	17.8	14.4	13.5	12.5	16.5	12.9	13.8	187.5
Average snowy days	5.9	3.6	0.6	0	0	0	0	0	0	0	0.1	2.1	12.3
Average relative humidity (%)	84	82	82	81	81	83	81	81	81	84	83	82	82
Mean monthly sunshine hours	30.7	45.2	63.5	87.8	102.4	88.1	150.1	161.6	115.9	74.0	70.7	49.8	1,039.8
Percentage possible sunshine	9	14	17	23	24	21	36	40	32	21	22	15	23
Source: China Meteorological Administration
