= 1994 Kenpeng mine disaster =

Explosion in Guangxi, China

- Date: August 1, 1994
- Time: 01:50 (UTC)
- Location: Guangxi, China
- Deaths: 77
- Injuries: 230

The 1994 Kenpeng mine disaster occurred in early August 1994, at Guangxi Kenpeng mine at the People's Republic of China. 77 people were killed.

== Mining disaster ==
About 8 tonnes of dynamite exploded in a warehouse at the lead and zinc Kenpeng mine, in the northern Huanjiang county of Guangxi, destroying a nearby workers' dormitory and nearly killing all inside. The blast flattened the dormitory and warehouses within 500 metres. Labour officials said Kenpeng had failed to maintain proper health and safety standards.

== Fall out ==
More than 200 government officials from the Guangxi region were mobilised to help with the rescue work and conduct investigation. There were more than 230 people injured with a death toll of 77. The government was also short of cash and could not give the victim's families adequate financial assistance.

== See also ==
- 2008 Guangxi chemical plant explosions
