= Zhou Shuguang =

Chinese blogger and citizen journalist

- 周曙光
- Born: Shaoshan, Hunan, China
- Other name: Zuola
- Citizenship: Taiwan (since 2018)
- Occupation: Blogger
- Years active: 2004–present

Zhou Shuguang (Chinese: 周曙光; pinyin: Zhōu Shǔguāng), also known as Zuola, is a Chinese blogger and citizen journalist. He has become known for traveling around China to document injustice done to citizens.

== Biography ==
Zhou was born near Shaoshan in Hunan province. He has been writing a blog documenting many sensitive issues in China, such as freedom of speech, Tibet, nail houses and government censorship of the media. His blog has attracted a lot of interest in China and as such the authorities have tried to shut it down on several occasions. However, Zhou hosts his blog from servers in the United States to get around the blocks. "I don’t feel like I’m in danger because what I’m doing is legal", Zhou states. Zhou advocates further reform in China and travels around the country documenting cases of injustice. During a visit to Hong Kong in 2007, he described it as a "harmonious society".

Zhou is mentioned as a prominent blogger in foreign media. He was invited to attend the Deutsche Welle citizen journalist awards on November 27, 2008, but was prevented from doing so.

On June 4, 2018, Zhou received Republic of China (Taiwan) citizenship.

== Activities ==
=== 2008 Tibetan unrest ===
During the 2008 Tibetan unrest, Zhou posted pictures and translated information from foreign news articles that were not mentioned in the state media and posted them on his website.

=== 2008 Weng'an riot ===
During the 2008 Weng'an riot, Zhou travelled to the area. He published interviews with Li Shufen's parents and photos of the riot's aftermath on his website. His and other bloggers' work was described as a major reason for four Chinese Communist Party, local government and security officials eventually being dismissed for misuse of power.

=== 2008 Yang Jia case ===
Zhou was critical of the impartiality of the court proceedings in the Yang Jia case and, along with others, signed an online petition demanding authorities investigate the causes of Yang Jia's murdering spree.

=== 2008 arrest ===
On August 14, 2008, Zhou was detained for just over an hour in his hometown in Hunan province. He was able to tweet what was happening as he was led out of the house then forced into a vehicle where he was driven back to his hometown of Meitanba. After his release, Zhou's computer was returned, but he was put under town arrest and is not allowed to leave Meitanba.
