= 2008 Weng'an riot =

Mass civic disobedience in China

The 2008 Weng'an riot (Chinese: 瓮安骚乱) was a riot on June 28, 2008, involving tens of thousands of residents in Weng'an County, Qiannan Buyei and Miao Autonomous Prefecture, in Guizhou province in Southwest China. Rioters smashed government buildings and torched several police cars to protest against an alleged police cover-up of a girl's death.

== Incident ==
=== Alleged rape and murder ===
A 16-year-old local girl by the name of Li Shufen (李树芬, born in July 1991) was found dead in a river. She was earlier spotted with two younger men who allegedly had familial ties with the local public security bureau. Li Shufen's family and friends have alleged that she had been raped and murdered by the son of a prominent Weng'an official and another youth and that her corpse had then been thrown into the river.

The subsequent media release denied the claims, and stated the two young men and one young woman involved were of local farmers' families.

=== Defending the coffin ===
The parents were guarding the girl's coffin day and night in fear the local police might attempt to tamper with the evidence. "We won't accept an evil deal," say parents. The parents reported there had already been two attempts to steal the dead body. An additional 100 local residents helped them guard the coffin.

== Claims ==
=== Police ===
The girl's dead body was pulled from the river on June 22, 2008. Initial police report said that the girl was drowned or jumped into the river and committed suicide. A document submitted by the local government stated the girl was unhappy with life because her parents favored her elder brother.

=== Girl's family and relatives ===
Relatives of the girl blamed the local police for shoddy investigation and possible corruption. One of the parents said a police officer threatened them, telling them: "Don't even try to file a lawsuit; there [is] no justice in this world."

=== Three murder suspects ===
Guizhou's official media published the first interview with three of the girl's friends (the murder suspects) on July 4, 2008. They were the last people to see the girl alive.

- Chen Guangquan (陈光权), 21 years old, was the victim's boyfriend. He denied any raping.
- Liu Yanchao (刘言超), 18 years old, said he did pushups on the bridge, then struggled after trying to save the girl.
- Wang Jiao (王娇), 16 years old, she was also at the scene.

== Protests ==
About 500 middle school students had gone to protest at the public security bureau, but they were turned away and beaten. Rumors were circulating that the girl's uncle, a local teacher, had been beaten when he questioned the police, and had died from his injuries at the local hospital but this was not confirmed. This roused an angry mob of thousands of people, who began overturning cars and setting fire to government buildings, including the local Chinese Communist Party headquarters. The Associated Press reported "30,000 angry citizens swarmed the streets". The riot lasted 7 hours with 150 people injured. About 160 office buildings and 40 cars were torched.

== Role of Chinese bloggers ==
- Zhou Shuguang, a self-claimed citizen journalist also known as "Zola" in the Chinese blogosphere, went to Weng'an to conduct a personal interview with Li Shufen's family, using a range of Internet communication tools like MSN, QQ, and Twitter, plus his own cell phone, posting to his personal web page unofficial reports along with photos and pleas from the family of Li Shufen. It was believed that this was the first time Twitter had ever been used to report a mass Chinese protest.

Zhou, as well as many other like-minded Chinese netizens, provided on-the-scene information on events like this, as a means to give voice to ordinary Chinese whose stories get overlooked or censored in a country where all the media is under the control of the Publicity Department of the Chinese Communist Party.

- Xinhua, the official central government news agency, played an unusual role in this incident, simply by keeping open a chat room for bloggers to voice their anger towards the local bunkering and incompetent officials. By June 29, there had been more than 200,000 hits on the 2,000 remarks left in the chatroom of the only uncensored official Xinhua website, mostly in strong condemnation of the way that police had allegedly mishandled the girl's death and used excessive force against protestors.
- At several other popular forums or chat sites, including Kdnet (猫眼看人), Maopu (猫撲), Strong Nation (强國), Sina.com, Netese (网易), and QQ, most of the users voiced their support for the Weng'an rioters, and they all supplied their own versions of information (including text, photos, and sometimes video files), different, or sometimes opposite to the versions supplied by the Guizhou police.

== Arrests ==
Authorities rounded up 300 people accused of taking part in the riot. Other sources have said 200 rioters were arrested. Over 1,500 paramilitary and riot police were dispatched to the county. Police detained 59 people for their alleged roles.

== Government response ==
Photographs as well as comments on the Guizhou protest in chatrooms and forums were quickly deleted by the mainland Internet censors. The government launched a campaign to defuse protest ahead of the Beijing Olympics to continue projecting an image of social harmony and stability. An "Olympics Stability Drive" was announced after the incident. Public security officials in Guizhou offered a total of 9,000 yuan (about $1,300 or £700 or €800) to the parents of the teenage girl, with 3,000 paid by each suspect. The father said "We will never accept an evil deal like this, we need to seek justice for our daughter."

== Investigation ==
The government Guizhou Daily newspaper claimed the family was too emotionally unstable to accept the findings. The Information Centre for Human Rights and Democracy said three men were questioned, but were let go. Xinhua News Agency reported on July 1, 2008, that the investigation would be reopened. The autopsy was carried out by five experts from the Guizhou public security department and the Higher People's Court. After three autopsies, there were no signs of any sexual attack according to state officials. The girl's father, Li Xiuzhong, did not accept the autopsy findings. He said "There is nothing I can do, they have sent 10 officials to my home, watching me day and night. They told me what to say when the reporters interviewed me. They threatened me that [if I said anything wrong], then another riot can happen and I must bear in mind that national security is at stake." Li Shufen was buried in her hometown about 20 km from Weng'an.

== See also ==
- 2008 Shenzhen anti-police riot
- Shishou incident
