= Shishou incident =

Mass protest and riot in China

Shishou Incident
- Date: June 19–21, 2009 (2 days)
- Location: Shishou, Hubei Province
- Caused by: Dubious circumstances surrounding the death of 24-year-old chef Tu Yuangao
- Methods: Protest, civil disobedience, rioting

Parties
Protesters	Local police forces People's Armed Police

Number
10 000 - 70 000 civilians (estimated)	10 000 riot police several armoured fighting vehicles

Casualties and losses
tens injured	tens injured

The Shishou Incident (Chinese: 石首事件) was a popular protest and riot in the city of Shishou, Hubei Province, in central China between June 19–21, 2009. The protests were the result of dubious circumstances surrounding the death of 24-year-old chef Tu Yuangao (涂遠高) of the local Yonglong Hotel (永隆大酒店).

Although local police claimed Tu's death was a suicide, some believed foul play was involved and crowds were angered by what they alleged to be cronyism, drug trafficking, and lack of transparency from the city's top officials. Protesters started gathering outside the hotel Friday and clashed with the police for two days. The incident later became a riot involving over 10,000 people and 10,000 police officers.

The number of people in the protest may have been as high as 70,000. According to Foreign Affairs magazine, "In a 2009 riot in Shishou, in Hubei Province, 70,000 people confronted police officers in what the Chinese Academy of Social Sciences, a government-affiliated think tank, considered to be 'the most serious street riot' since 1949."

== Tu's death ==
On 17 June 2009, Tu Yuangao (涂遠高 Tú Yuǎngāo), a 24-year-old chef at Yonglong Hotel was found dead outside the hotel gate. Police said a suicide note left by the chef showed he was "pessimistic and hated the world". On 18 June 2009 the local police declared that it was a suicide case, and offered RMB 35,000 (about US$5,000) for compensation in exchange for immediate cremation of the dead body, in addition to the family signing a public statement "admitting" to the death as a suicide.

Tu's father declined the police offer. He began to barricade his son's body against the police, who then attempted to remove the body by force. Local people gathered to guard the coffin, which was placed on the first floor of the hotel.

A local woman surnamed Cheng said local government officials were involved with the hotel and were engaged in drug trafficking. She claimed that Tu decided to quit, but was later beaten to death by hotel staff or gangsters. Tu's relatives believe he was killed by the hotel boss, who was a relative of the Mayor.

== Rioting ==
On 20 June there were five or six clashes between protesters and police. Six police vans and fire trucks were smashed. The hotel, owned by a local government official, was also burned down.

Armed police officers with shields and batons were deployed. The local authorities cut off internet connections in the area, although many users bypassed censorship and were able to relay messages through services such as Twitter. Street lights were also turned off. The supporting crowds started to grow in numbers, at one time it was alleged about 60,000 to 70,000 people were on the street, throwing rocks and empty beer bottles at the police. Some sources claim a peak number of residents gathering at 40,000.

== Aftermath ==
On 21 June, the gendarme People's Armed Police surrounded Yonglong Hotel and recovered the dead body. Asia Times reported allegations that the co-owners of the hotel were family members of the mayor and the head of the local police, and the hotel was used as an illegal centre for drug trafficking; it reported that Tu Yuangao was murdered when he threatened to expose the illicit activities there. More than 200 people were injured in the clash. During the course of the resulting protest, three more dead bodies were found buried in the hotel basement. There were already five mysterious homicide cases at the hotel, but only two had been solved.

A spokesman from the Shishou city government said experts from the Ministry of Public Security and Tongji Medical Institute carried out an autopsy, which ostensibly confirmed that Tu committed suicide. Tu was cremated at 4 am on 25 June 2009. The government promised the deceased's family a total of 80,000 yuan, including 30,000 yuan from the Yonglong Hotel, 35,000 yuan from the Shishou government and 15,000 yuan from the local Gaojimiao township government.

== See also ==
- 2008 Weng'an riot
