= 2008 Guangxi chemical plant explosions =

Industrial accident in Guangxi, China

A series of explosions caused by an industrial accident occurred on August 26, 2008 in Yizhou city in Guangxi province in southwest China.

The disaster occurred at a factory owned by Guangxi Guangwei Chemical Co. in the development zone of Yizhou city

According to the state-run Xinhua News Agency, "the plant mainly produces polyvinyl acetate (PVA), which is used in adhesives, calcium carbide, and vinyl acetate monomer (VAM), which is used in paints, adhesives and coatings."

The first explosion occurred at about 6 a.m. on August 26 at an organic compound workshop inside the plant; the cause is unknown. Other explosions continued until 1 p.m. Fire spread over an area of nearly 108,000 square feet (10,000m²). The explosions caused the leak of toxic substances, including ammonia, formaldehyde, acetylene, sulfurated hydrogen and carbon monoxide.

At least 20 people were killed and at least 60 were injured; six people remained missing following the explosions. Fearing further explosions and leaks, the government evacuated 11,500 residents.

Xinhua quoted the provincial toxic substances emergency center director as saying that the explosions causes no serious air or water pollution. The director also said that dams had been erected to prevent discharge of pollutants into the nearby Long River (Longjiang).

== See also ==
- 2005 Jilin chemical plant explosions
- 1994 Kenpeng mine disaster
