= Guizhou Daily =

Simplified Chinese newspaper

- Native name: 贵州日报
- Founded: November 28, 1949
- Language: Simplified Chinese
- Headquarters: Guizhou
- Website: www.eyesnews.cn

Guizhou Daily (simplified Chinese: 贵州日报; traditional Chinese: 貴州日報; pinyin: Guìzhōu Rìbào) is the largest provincial newspaper by readership of the southern Chinese province of Guizhou. It is the official newspaper of the Guizhou Provincial Committee of the Chinese Communist Party. The paper was launched on November 28, 1949, under the name of Xinqian Daily (新黔日报), and was renamed to its present name on 1 January 1957.

Founded after the Chinese Civil War, both Guizhou Daily and the Guiyang Daily (贵阳日报) formed the main basis of communication across the province. In recent years, popularity has given way to its subsidiaries:

- Guizhou Business Daily (贵州商报; Guìzhōu Shāngbào)
- Guizhou Metropolitan Daily (贵州都市报; Guìzhōu Dūshì Bào)
- China Western Development Report (西部开发报; Xībù Kāifā Bào)
- Economic Information Times (经济信息时报; Jīngjì Xìnxī Shíbào)
- New Times (新报; Xīn Bào)
- Tianxia Digest (天下文摘; Tiānxià Wénzhāi)
- News Window (新闻窗; Xīnwén Chuāng)

In March 2018, Guizhou Daily won the Third National Top 100 Newspapers in China.
