= Kolešov =

- Municipality
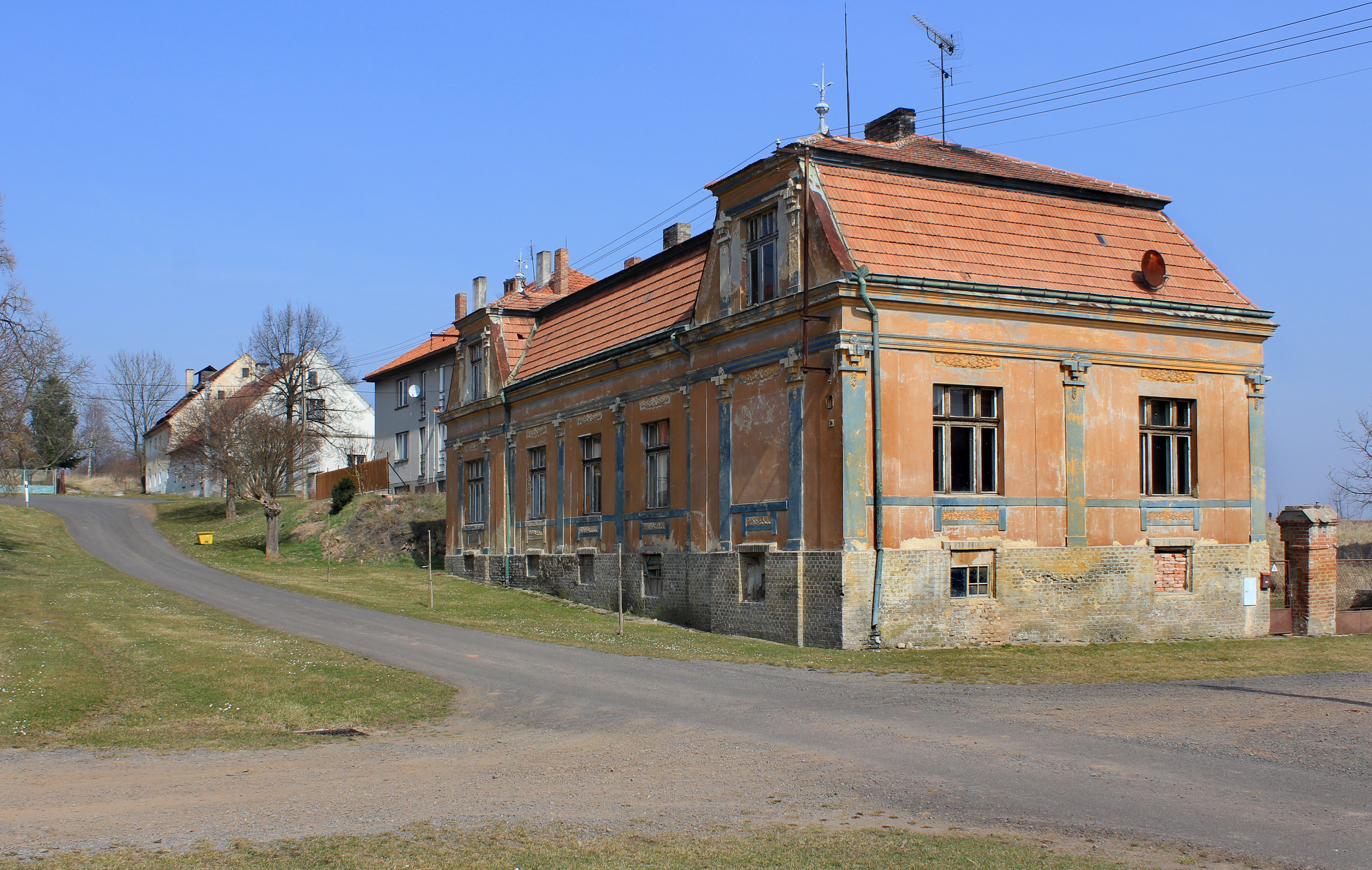
- Eastern part of Kolešov

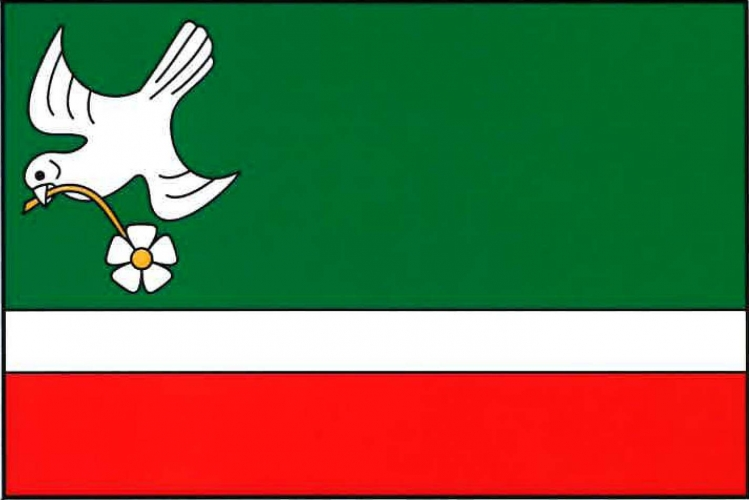
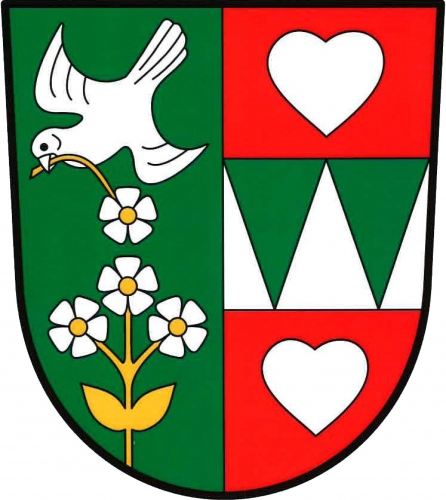
- Flag Coat of arms

- Location in the Czech Republic
- Coordinates: 50°9′26″N 13°30′36″E
- Country: Czech Republic
- Region: Central Bohemian
- District: Rakovník
- First mentioned: 1319

Area
  - Total: 5.15 km^{2} (1.99 sq mi)
- Elevation: 385 m (1,263 ft)

Population (2026-01-01)
  - Total: 154
  - Density: 29.9/km^{2} (77.4/sq mi)
- Time zone: UTC+1 (CET)
  - Summer (DST): UTC+2 (CEST)
- Postal code: 270 04
- Website: www.kolesov.cz

Kolešov is a municipality and village in Rakovník District in the Central Bohemian Region of the Czech Republic. It has about 200 inhabitants.

== Etymology ==
The name is derived from the personal name Koleš, meaning "Koleš's (court)".

== Geography ==
Kolešov is located about 16 kilometres (10 mi) northwest of Rakovník and 60 km (37 mi) west of Prague. It lies in an agricultural landscape in the Rakovník Uplands. The highest point is the hill Liščí vrch at 436 m (1,430 ft) above sea level.

== History ==
The first written mention of Kolešov is from 1319.

== Demographics ==
Historical population

Year	Pop.	±%
1869	334	—
1880	347	+3.9%
1890	308	−11.2%
1900	326	+5.8%
1910	319	−2.1%

Year	Pop.	±%
1921	343	+7.5%
1930	354	+3.2%
1950	153	−56.8%
1961	153	+0.0%
1970	147	−3.9%

Year	Pop.	±%
1980	152	+3.4%
1991	120	−21.1%
2001	101	−15.8%
2011	128	+26.7%
2021	135	+5.5%

Source: Censuses

== Transport ==
There is an intersection of two important roads: the I/6, part of the European route E48, which replaces an unfinished section of the D6 motorway from Prague to Karlovy Vary, and the I/27, leading from Plzeň to Most.

== Sights ==
There are no protected cultural monuments in the municipality. In the centre of Kolešov is a small chapel.
