= Álvaro Arias =

Spanish linguist

Álvaro Arias Cabal (Oviedo, Spain, 1969) is a Spanish linguist and Hispanist specialist in the fields of phonology, morphology and dialectology. He has more than thirty scholarly publications.

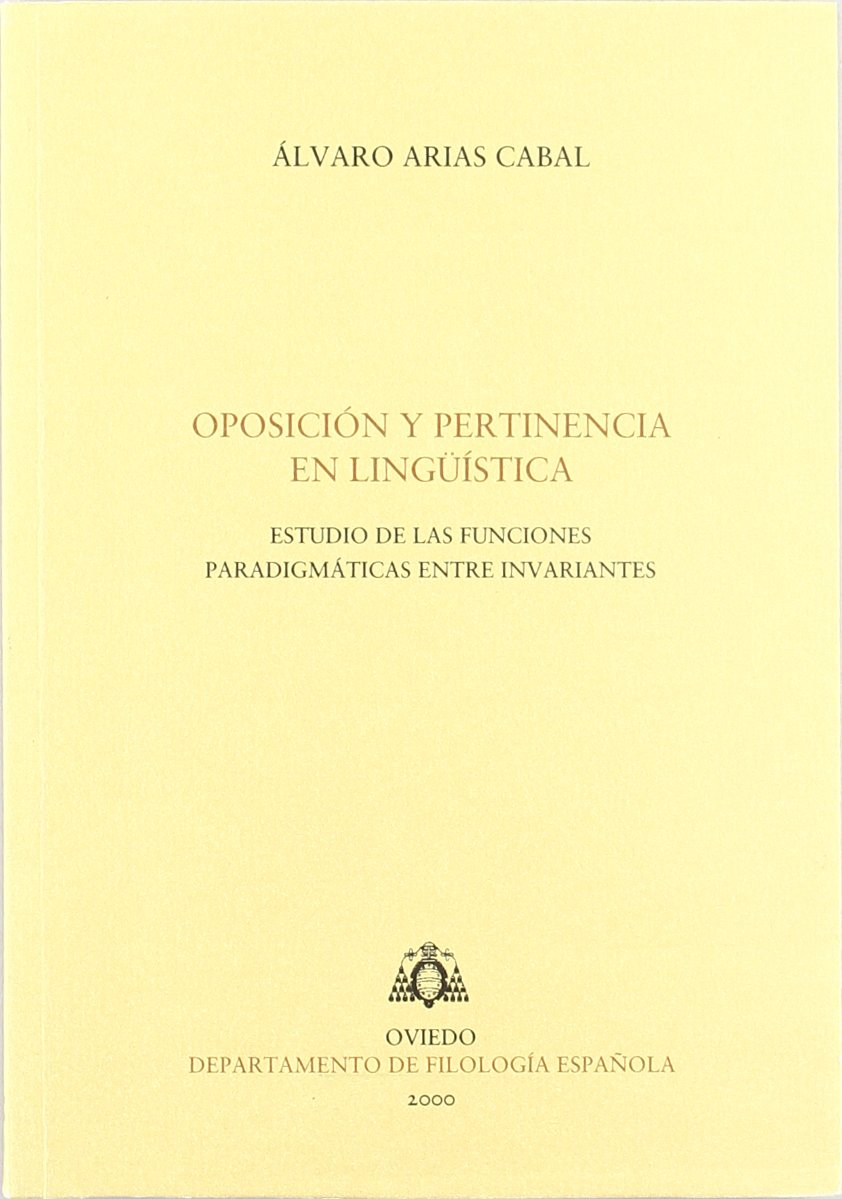
Cover of Álvaro Arias's book "Oposición y pertinencia en Lingüística"

Born in Oviedo, with family roots in Felechosa (Aller, Asturias), is a linguist and Hispanist. He was educated at University of Oviedo, where he received a BA in Spanish philology and a PhD in Spanish linguistics.

He is professor of Spanish philology at the University of Oviedo and author of publications on phonology and grammar, from a theoretical and dialectal perspective, with special attention to the Spanish, Galician and Asturian languages. He has published over 30 articles and book chapters, and edited or authored several books, in these areas.

He has also published studies of linguistic historiography and rescued and published literature in Asturian of the eighteenth and nineteenth centuries.

Damaso Alonso Prize of Philological Research, he has also received other awards for his academic work.
