= Wang Donglei =

Chinese footballer

Wang Donglei 王冬雷
Personal information
- Full name: Wang Donglei
- Date of birth: January 1, 1985
- Place of birth: Liaoning, China
- Date of death: April 5, 2008 (aged 23)
- Place of death: Nanjing, Jiangsu, China
- Height: 1.82 m (6 ft 0 in)
- Position: Midfielder

Youth career
- 2005: Liaoning F.C.

Senior career*
Years	Team	Apps	(Gls)
2006–2007	Nanjing Yoyo		
- * Club domestic league appearances and goals

Wang Donglei (Simplified Chinese: 王冬雷) (1 January 1985 – 5 April 2008) was a Chinese footballer. He played for Nanjing Yoyo in Chinese Jia League.

Wang Donglei was only 23 years old when he died in a car accident on the night of 5 April 2008. He is the first footballer to have died during his playing career in the Chinese professional football league.
