= An Yue Jiang =

Chinese container vessel

History
- Name: An Yue Jiang
- Operator: COSCO
- Port of registry: Guangzhou, People's Republic of China
- Builder: Guangzhou International Shipyard, Guangzhou, People's Republic of China
- Launched: 10 July 1986
- Completed: 1986
- Identification: IMO number: 8414946; Call sign: BOAS; MMSI number: 412027000
- Fate: Scrapped 29 November 2013

General characteristics
- Type: General cargo ship
- Tonnage: 11,115 GT; 14,913 DWT
- Length: 150 m (490 ft)
- Beam: 20 m (66 ft)
- Draft: 9.4 m (31 ft)

An Yue Jiang (Chinese: 安岳江, Hanyu Pinyin: Ān Yuè Jiāng) is a People's Republic of China container vessel operated by the state-run shipping firm COSCO. In 2008, it became notable because of controversy surrounding a cargo of arms and ammunition destined for Zimbabwe. The cargo reportedly included some 3 million rounds of small arms ammunition, 1,500 rocket propelled grenades, and 2,500 mortar rounds. The vessel originally planned to dock at the South African port of Durban and unload its cargo for shipment to landlocked Zimbabwe. However, there were widespread protests by persons concerned that the arms would be used by Robert Mugabe's regime in suppressing political opposition in the wake of disputed elections. Dock workers stated that they would not unload the cargo, and others threatened to stop the shipment on South African roads. Finally, a South African judge ruled that the ship could not dock as planned.

Subsequently, the An Yue Jiang remained in the area of the Cape of Good Hope, pending a rumored decision by the Chinese to recall the ship. It was then announced that the ship would proceed to Angola, where it would be allowed to dock but only to unload cargo destined for Angola itself.

== Arrival in Africa ==
On 14 April 2008 the scrutiny committee of South Africa's National Conventional Arms Control Committee (NCACC) approved the shipment's conveyance permit, although it said shipment still had to be inspected and approved by the NCACC. According to South African government spokesperson Themba Maseko, the government was not going to prevent the shipment from being transported to Zimbabwe.

Critics suggested that the South African government would have been acting irresponsibly or even aiding the Zimbabwean government by letting the shipment through. The issue compounded the dissatisfaction felt by many critics of the Zimbabwean government regarding South Africa's nonconfrontational approach to dealing with Mugabe, exemplified by Mbeki's claim that the post-election situation was not a crisis. However, on 17 April, the South African Transport and Allied Workers Union (SATAWU) said that members of the union would not unload the ship or handle its cargo.

The Durban High Court issued an order on 18 April effectively barring the shipment; another order allowed a German development bank to seize the cargo in compensation for an unpaid debt owed by the Zimbabwean government. The An Yue Jiang abandoned its attempt to make port in South Africa on the same day, and it reportedly headed instead for Luanda, Angola. The Mozambican government said on 19 April that the An Yue Jiang would not be allowed into its waters, and on 21 April, the Director of the Institute of Angolan Ports, Filomeno Mendonça, said that the ship was "not authorised to enter Angolan ports".

On 21 April, Zambian President Mwanawasa appealed to SADC governments to forbid entry to the ship, expressing concern that the arms would increase tension in Zimbabwe. Meanwhile, Justice Minister Chinamasa dismissed the controversy as a "hullabaloo about a lone ship", asserting that Zimbabwe had the sovereign right to legitimately purchase arms to defend itself. Jiang Yu, a spokesperson for the Chinese Foreign Ministry, said on 22 April that the ship might be forced to turn back due to its failure to find a place to unload the shipment. She asserted that the shipment involved only "perfectly normal trade in military goods between China and Zimbabwe", with no connection to the events surrounding the election, and that the contract for it had been signed in 2007. In a statement on the same day, the MDC said that the arms were "clearly meant to butcher innocent civilians whose only crime is rejecting dictatorship and voting change".

According to the Lloyd's Marine Intelligence Unit, the ship was moving northwest up the coast on 22 April, but subsequently the ship's location could not be precisely determined, either because it had switched off its Automatic Identification System or because it was more than 40–50 nautical miles from the coast (outside the range of the Automatic Identification System). The United States requested that countries in the region not accept the ship, and it asked China "to refrain from making additional shipments and, if possible, to bring this one back". On 22 April, it was reported that the China Ocean Shipping Company had decided to recall the ship due to its inability to deliver its cargo, and on 23 April, the ship was reported to have turned around and was near the Cape of Good Hope.

On 17 May, The Weekender reported that the arms had arrived in Harare. The cargo was reportedly offloaded at Pointe-Noire in the Republic of the Congo and then flown to Zimbabwe. Matonga declined to comment on this, while the Chinese Foreign Ministry described the reports as "baseless and purely fictitious" on 21 May, saying that the An Yue Jiang was returning to China with the arms still on board.

== Alleged arrival of weapons ==
However, on 19 May, a Mozambican newspaper, the Canal de Moçambique, stated that the arms had not only been offloaded (although the newspaper had stated the location of offloading as at Pointe-Noire in the Republic of the Congo, while the Zimbabwean government had stated that the weapons were offloaded in Luanda), but were flown to Harare by Avient Ltd, a UK-registered airplane business, using an Ilyushin Il-76. This transaction was negotiated during the first week of May by two Zimbabwean government ministers and some of the top officers of the Zimbabwean military who flew to Angola to negotiate the delivery of the weapons. The arrival of the weapons in Harare was confirmed by the Zimbabwean government.

The report also stated that the An Yue Jiang had been refueled by the South African fleet replenishment ship SAS Drakensberg, allegedly after a direct order given by South African president Thabo Mbeki to Deputy Defence Minister Mluleki George. This was categorically denied by the South African government, denouncing it as the result of a "season of propaganda".

On 24 June, a spokesperson for the Chinese Foreign Ministry was asked if the An Yue Jiang's cargo had reached Zimbabwe, as Zimbabwean officials were then claiming. The spokesperson did not address the cargo, but said simply that the ship "had already returned to China".
