= Wo Weihan =

Chinese scientist and entrepreneur of Daur nationality

- Born: 1949; Qiqihar, Nenjiang, China (now in Heilongjiang, China)
- Died: November 28, 2008 (aged 58–59); China
- Cause of death: Execution for treason
- Occupation: Biomedical researcher

Wo Weihan (Chinese: 沃维汉; pinyin: Wò Wéihàn; 1949 – November 28, 2008), a native of Qiqihar, Heilongjiang, was a Chinese scientist and entrepreneur of Daur nationality. He was executed at the age of 58–59 on November 28, 2008, by firing squad, along with missile expert Guo Wanjun, 66, for passing sensitive information to a Taiwanese NGO. Weihan was interrogated for ten months in 2005 and allowed access to a lawyer in 2006. His trial was held in secrecy in 2007.

== Charges ==
The case against Wo related to alleged passing of sensitive national security information, which China argued justified special handling of the case.

It was claimed that Wo became a spy for Taiwan intelligence agency with the codename "YANG DONG". He got to know Mr Guo during a wedding ceremony in early 1990s. The Taiwan intelligence agency also invested (USD) $300,000 to help Wo's first wife, to set up a restaurant in Austria.

Mainland Chinese media and portals, including Global Times and Sina, released details of Wo and Guo's spying activities after the execution. In the early nineties, Wo Weihan bought critical information and documents on DF-31, from Guo Wanjun, a missile expert who had participated in the design of DF-31. Wo and Guo's activities resulted in the leakage of the top secret information of the DF-31, including internal design and structure of the missile, causing significant impact on Chinese national security. They both were accused of spying for Taiwan and US intelligence agencies by selling sensitive information on intercontinental ballistic missiles. Neither Taiwan nor US have made an official statement in this regard.

According to the verdict released by the High Court of Beijing after the sentencing in March 2008, the charges Wo Weihan was convicted of included: "...discussing the health of senior Chinese leaders." In PRC, the health status of senior leaders is declared top secret. Also included in the verdict were convictions of the smuggling of secret information of PLA's night time equipment. Wo was also accused of copying military photos from a magazine, which was public at the time but later declared classified.

== Disputes ==
The execution took place on the final day of the China-EU Human Rights Dialog in Beijing. The US and the EU strongly condemned the execution.

“We are deeply disturbed and dismayed by reports that the Chinese government has carried out the death penalty against Wo Weihan,” Susan Stevenson, a spokeswoman at the US embassy in Beijing said. She said that Wo's arrest and trial had fallen short of international standards for due process. “Reportedly Mr Wo did not have access to legal counsel until after the prosecuting officials completed their investigation. His confession was coerced and the charges against him were questionable.”

Their executions came at a time when China had been presenting itself as a reformed and more humane state, particularly on the eve of China's Olympic debut. The EU and US response to the executions indicate that the executions severely challenged the credibility of the SPC death penalty review reform, which aimed to reduce the number of executions in China (estimated at 7000 per year). Wo's two daughters, both Austrian citizens, resorted to Austria and EU to first request a fair and transparent trial for their father, and later pleaded for amnesty as the deficiencies in the prosecution of the case became clear. Diplomatic efforts made behind the curtains had no result for three years. Media coverage and an expanded advocacy campaign which included pleas by Condoleezza Rice, President Heinz Fischer of Austria and the EU Troika were also in vain.

== Family ==
Wo Weihan's wife and younger daughter saw Wo Weihan on the morning of November 27. None were given official confirmation that the sentence had been approved and that an execution was pending. Wo's elder daughter expected to be able to see her father that week after the Chinese Ministry Foreign Affairs promised to the Austrian Embassy in Beijing that a second visit would be allowed for her. However, Wo was executed on the morning of November 28. This led to very strained relations between the Austrian and Chinese Ministries of Foreign Affair; Austria viewed it as an intentional affront.

According to Qin Gang, the spokesman of the Ministry of Foreign Affairs,".....Wo Weihan is a Chinese citizen.... He could not be treated in a different way only because he has some foreign relatives."

Guo's family were not allowed to visit Guo during the years of imprisonment, and only five days after the execution, which they had found out about through Wo's family, did they receive a notice that they could pick up Guo's ashes.
