= Lu Keng =

Lu Keng (Chinese: 陸鏗; pinyin: lù kēng born 1919 in Baoshan, Yunnan, China, died June 22, 2008, in San Francisco, California, USA) was a reporter for more than 60 years during some of the most turbulent times in Chinese history. As a journalist, he was banned both in mainland China and Taiwan. His articles criticised authorities and state leaders in the past, winning him the renowned title of "true journalist". He spent a total of 22 years in jail in China under both the Communist Party and Kuomintang governments.

== Biography ==
Lu was nicknamed "Big noise" (大聲) and used the pen name "Chen Ji-sun" (陳棘蓀). He graduated from the journalism training programme at the Central Politics School and became the first radio reporter in China. He joined the field in 1940.

Stationed in Europe during World War II, he won his early reputation through his interviews with American generals Eisenhower, MacArthur and Marshall.

He moved to Hong Kong in April 1978 and established Pai Xing (百姓), a Chinese-language bi-weekly magazine, with editor Hu Juren in 1981. He also taught at the Hong Kong Shue Yan University and wrote a column in the Hong Kong Economic Journal. He was married to Yang Hsi-chen.

== Controversies ==
=== With Republic of China ===
Lu was promoted to editor of the China Times in Nanjing after the war and then jailed by the Kuomintang after disclosing the corruption of senior officials Kong Xiangxi and Song Ziwen.

=== With People's Republic of China ===
His call for freedom of speech in 1957 once again landed him in jail, this time in the Communist Party's Anti-Rightist Campaign. He was not freed until 1975. He said in an interview that his "optimistic character" helped him endure his long stint in prison.

Lu interviewed Communist Party general secretary Hu Yaobang in Beijing on May 10, 1985, and published an article which touched on many sensitive issues and described Hu as an enlightened liberal likely to tolerate dissent. The article contributed to Deng Xiaoping's decision to sack Hu in 1987.

The Chinese government blacklisted Lu in 1990 and forbade him from entering the mainland for helping former Xinhua Hong Kong director Xu Jiatun (許家屯), who was exiled to the US for siding with reformist leader Zhao Ziyang during the Tiananmen protests in 1989.

== Death ==
Lu died on June 22, 2008, in a hospital in San Francisco after struggling with a blood clot in his lungs for 10 days. He was 89. His remains were sent to his hometown in Yunnan.

== Quotes about Lu ==
"He was very proud of being a journalist and, in contrast to many who tend to become a senior editor after accumulating years of experience, he never thought it shameful to be a working journalist, even when he was old," said Li Pu, former Xinhua deputy head.

Senior journalist Yang Jisheng said Lu had "never bowed to power, never bowed to anybody, he was only responsible for facts".
