= Julio Mozzo =

Uruguayan footballer (born 1981)

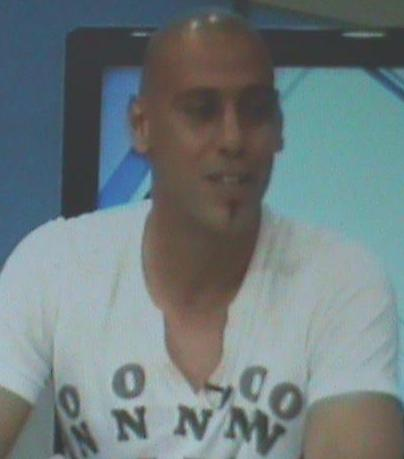
- Mozzo in 2012

Personal information
- Full name: Julio Fabián Mozzo Valdéz
- Date of birth: 20 April 1981 (age 45)
- Place of birth: Montevideo, Uruguay
- Height: 1.84 m (6 ft 0 in)
- Position: Midfielder

Team information
- Current team: Villa Española (manager)

Senior career*
Years	Team	Apps	(Gls)
2000–2006	Central Español	132	(12)
2007–2009	Peñarol	48	(6)
2010	Anagennisi Karditsa	13	(0)
2010–2011	Independiente Rivadavia	32	(4)
2011–2013	Rosario Central	28	(0)
2013–2014	Atlético Tucumán	11	(0)
2014	Douglas Haig	21	(3)
2014–2015	Talleres Córdoba	16	(1)
2015–2016	Ferro Carril Oeste	36	(1)
2016	Fénix	16	(1)
2016–2017	Platense	22	(0)
2017–2018	Progreso	8	(0)
2019	Central Español	16	(4)
2020–2021	Villa Española	18	(0)

International career
2003–2007	Uruguay	3	(0)

Managerial career
- 2021–: Villa Española
- * Club domestic league appearances and goals

Julio Fabián Mozzo Valdéz (born 20 April 1981) is a Uruguayan association football manager and former player who played as a midfielder. He is the current manager of Villa Española.

== Honours ==
- Peñarol 2008 (Uruguayan Championship)
