= Lee Se-hwan =

South Korean footballer

Lee Se-Hwan
Personal information
- Full name: Lee Se-Hwan
- Date of birth: 21 April 1986 (age 40)
- Place of birth: South Korea
- Height: 1.80 m (5 ft 11 in)
- Positions: Forward; defender

Team information
- Current team: Goyang Hi FC
- Number: 2

Youth career
- Korea University

Senior career*
Years	Team	Apps	(Gls)
2008–2010	Ulsan Hyundai	19	(0)
2010–2012	Incheon Korail	36	(4)
2013–	Goyang Hi FC	50	(4)
- * Club domestic league appearances and goals as of 28 November 2014

Lee Se-Hwan (Korean: 이세환; born 21 April 1986) is a South Korean football player who plays for the Goyang Hi FC in the K League Challenge.

He played for Ulsan Hyundai in the K-League.
