= 2008 Longnan riot =

2008 riot in China

- Part of protest and dissent in China
- Date: November 17, 2008
- Location: Longnan, Gansu, People's Republic of China
- Injuries: 74

The 2008 Longnan riot was a protest that turned into a riot involving thousands of people in Longnan, Gansu, People's Republic of China.

== Cause ==
The state media did not explain the source of the unrest, though local residents said many protesters were angered by the government's decision to transfer its offices to a wealthier city. Residents in Longnan said the disturbances there were fueled by economic distress, unchecked corruption and a lack of transparency by the local Communist Party.

== Riot ==
A crowd of about 1,000 - 2,000 people attacked a government office in northwest Gansu province, smashing cars and beating up police and officials. The crowd eventually grew to 10,000 according to some sources. Armed police officers from the provincial capital used tear gas to subdue the rioters.

== Aftermath ==
Damages are estimated at more than five million yuan (US$731,000).
