= 2008 Kunming bus bombings =

Vehicle bombings in Kunming, China

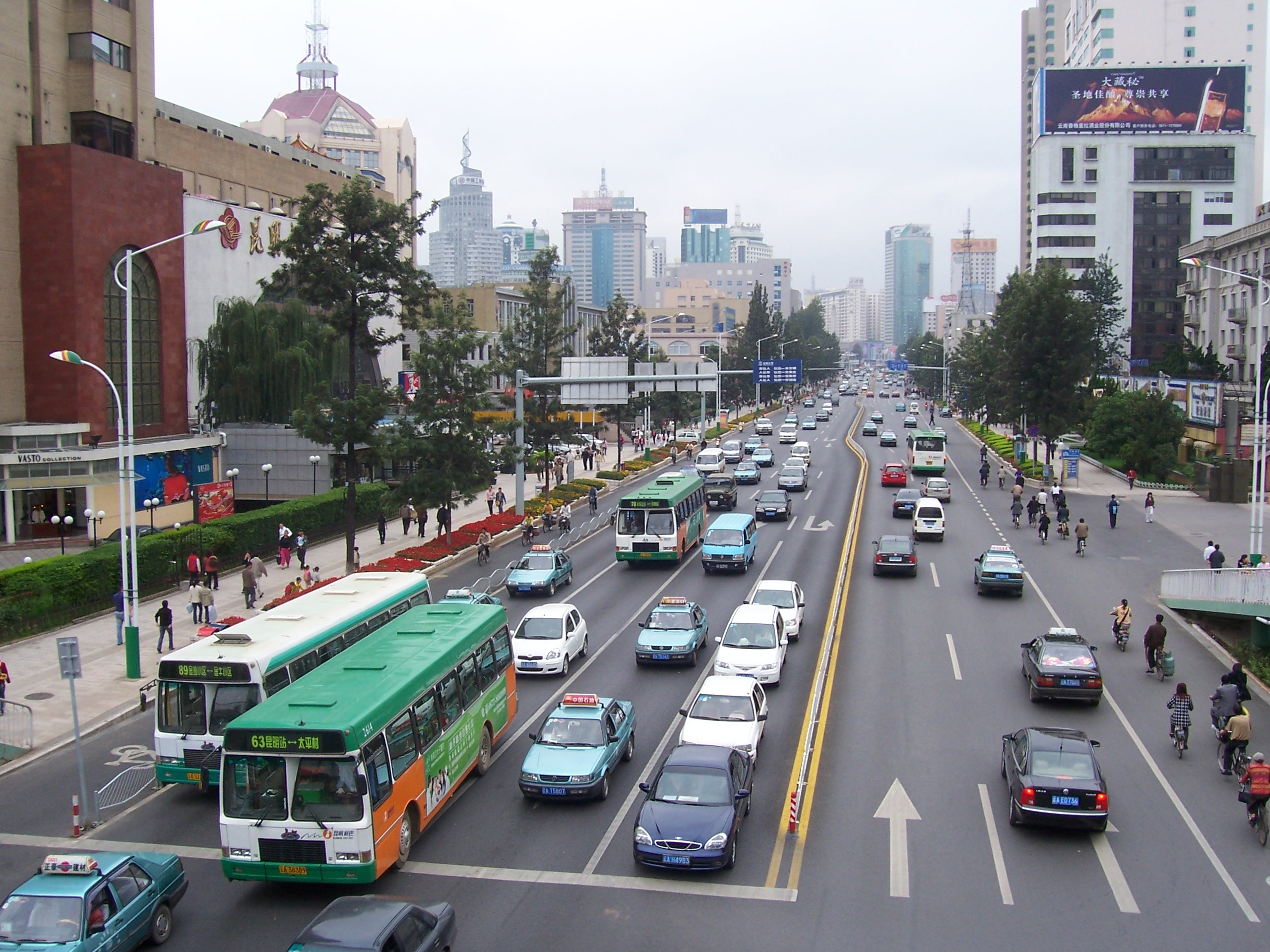
- An archive photo showing buses in Kunming
- Location: Kunming, China
- Date: 21 July 2008; 23:00 (GMT)
- Attack type: Bombings, double-murder
- Deaths: 2
- Injuries: 14
- Perpetrator: Li Yan (murderer)

The 2008 Kunming bus bombings occurred on 21 July 2008 when explosions aboard two public buses in downtown Kunming, the capital of southwest China's Yunnan province, killed two people. The explosions were deliberate, according to police. The attacks occurred amid heightened tensions due to the Beijing Olympics. Although the Turkestan Islamic Party claimed responsibility for the incident, China later said the explosions were "not an act of terrorism".

== Details ==
The blasts occurred about an hour apart during morning rush hour traffic in downtown Kunming, the city's police department said in a statement. The first blast occurred at about 7:00 am (2300 GMT Sunday) when the vehicle was at a bus stop, killing one woman and injuring 10 other people, the statement from Kunming police said. "The glass on both sides of the vehicle was all shattered and some of the seats were warped," it said. The second blast came about an hour later on the same road and killed one man, injuring four others, according to the statement.

Footage broadcast on state-run television showed a large hole blown in the side of one of the buses and extensive damage to its interior. Photos posted on the Yunnan Daily website showed one of the vehicle's windows blown out by the blast and shattered glass on the road.

Following the blasts, police cordoned off some streets in the area and carried out identity checks in a search for any "suspicious" persons, the Yunnan Public Security Bureau said in a statement.

== Responsibility ==
On 26 July 2008, an alleged video of a group calling itself the Turkestan Islamic Party, claimed to have carried out bomb attacks on the buses in Kunming, along with an attack in May 2008 in Shanghai. The Washington-based IntelCenter, which monitors terrorism communications, claimed the group released a video entitled Our Blessed Jihad in Yunnan. In it, the group's leader, Commander Seyfullah, claimed credit for several attacks and threatened this month's Olympics. "Despite the Turkestan Islamic Party's repeated warnings to China and international community about stopping the 29th Olympics in Beijing, the Chinese have haughtily ignored our warnings," IntelCenter quoted him as saying. "The Turkestan Islamic Party volunteers who had gone through special preparations have started urgent actions."

However, China's foreign ministry said that it examined IntelCenter's claims and dismissed the claims, concluding that the group was not behind the attack.

After a premature bombing of Salvador's Cafe (a popular cafe and restaurant amongst expats) on Christmas Eve that year failed to kill anyone but injured the bomber, Police interrogated the man responsible, Li Yan, and determined that he was also behind the bus bombings over the summer. The bomber died of his injuries.
