= Gordey Kolesov =

Russian chess player (born 2008)

- Гордей Колесов
- Born: Kolesov Gordei` Evgen`evich; August 18, 2008 (age 17); Moscow, Russia
- Chess career
- Country: Russia
- FIDE rating: 1754 (January 2018)
- Peak rating: 1772 (October 2017)

Gordey Kolesov (born August 18, 2008) is the winner of the 2015 Talent Show in China (at the age of six years and five months) on Chinese central television, CCTV-1, a winner of chess competitions, a laureate of creative contests, speaks 5 languages (Russian, Chinese, Spanish, English, French), knows 555 Chinese idioms by heart, a child prodigy. Kirsan Ilyumzhinov, President of the International Chess Federation (FIDE) called Gordey “the little Buddha of the chess world.” Gordey has three younger sisters – Milana, Agatha and Eseniya.

== Biography ==
Gordey was born in Moscow. At the age of two months, his parents took him to Guangzhou where his father, Evgeny Kolesov, ran Optim Consult, a company specializing in the delivery of goods and equipment from China, having worked in the country for more than 15 years. Russian name: Гордей Колесов, Simplified Chinese: 叶伟国, Pinyin: Yè Wěi Guó – translated from Chinese as “E Great Country” or “E Great State”. Gordey debuted on TV in April 2014, in Alexey Lysenkov's show titled “Be Your Own Director” (the Russian version of “America’s Funniest Home Videos”) on Russia-1. Gordey won the “Will you dare” segment of the program on two occasions by demonstrating his knowledge of Chinese hieroglyphics and performing a song in Chinese with his younger sister Milana.

In September 2014, Gordey joined an externship at the secondary school with in-depth studies in a foreign language (English) at the Russian Embassy in China (Beijing). His interest in chess began at the same time.

In January 2015, Gordey took part in Talent Show on CCTV-1, Chinese Central television, and won it. The Chinese media were delighted with the way Gordey and his father spoofed a famous Chinese TV host, Madam Zhudan. They asked the host to explain the meaning of a Chinese idiom, baffling her. Gordey was the first foreigner to achieve such success. The video with Russian subtitles was published on ‘China with Evgeny Kolesov’ on YouTube in late February 2015, getting more than 1 million views in one week. According to some commentators, the young Russian achieved more for the Russian-Chinese relationship than diplomats have; some even see him as a prominent diplomat in the future The Chinese media wrote about his father's large role in developing his sons talents.

After winning the Talent Show, young Gordey Kolesov was invited to a closed privileged school for free training in the megalopolis of Guangzhou which has a population of 15 million. Open to students from the wealthiest families of the highest government officials and army generals, the school normally charges more than 20,000 US dollars per year[26][27]. Gordey's parents also received dozens of invitations from TV stations in China to appear on various shows.

In February 2015, Gordey won silver medal for a drawing in the Russian-Chinese children's and youth creative contest entitled “China to Russia. Bridges of friendship,” organized as part of Years of Russian-Chinese Friendship and Youth Exchanges (2014-2015). In the same month, he won the Audience Choice Award at the first Chinese Calligraphy Hard Pen Contest-2014. A video was shown at the contest with Gordey talking about his calligraphic talents. The prize was awarded by SCO General Secretary Dmitry Mezentsev, who was very excited about the young talent's achievements (Gordey was the youngest contestant) and called upon everyone to follow Gordey's example. “During the ceremony the talented Russian boy read a poem by Su Shi (a renowned poet of the Song era – Editor) and received a standing ovation from the audience.” Xinhua, China's official press agency, also wrote about Gordey's achievements.

On June 1, 2015, a video was shown on the Internet from the Talent Show Gala Concert on Chinese Central Television, CCTV-1. Gordey amazed the judges and the audience alike by calculating the age of Sun Wukong, the Monkey King from a classical Chinese 16th century novel “Journey to the West.” Popular Chinese TV host Liu Yiwei fell off a sofa after hearing the Russian boy's monologue. The video gathered more than half a million views in less than three days after it was uploaded to YouTube. The media called Gordey a child prodigy. Gordey's father, Evgeny Kolesov, told NTV in an interview that he doesn't think his son is a prodigy. According to his father, “Gordey is just a child that is loved, disciplined, and enjoys studying.” Gordey's videos are commonly watched by students at the Military Translators Institute under the Russian Federation Ministry of Defense and future diplomats from MGIMO, who speak highly about the boy's language skills.

Mikhail Efremov, theater and film actor and Merited Artist of Russia, preparing Top-5 News for June 4 especially for the National News Service information agency, wrote this about Gordey: “A six-year-old Russian child prodigy Gordey Kolesov won the talent show which aired on Chinese Central Television. Gordey knows five languages, is a top-ranked chess player and a member of the Russian national team in this sport. Gordey, you are our future, the entire country is watching you!”

In spring 2015, two central Chinese TV stations made documentaries about Gordey and his family.

== Interest in chess ==
Gordey got interested in chess during the summer of 2014. By November, he had already taken part in the Guangzhou chess contest, winning the silver prize.

Starting in January 2015, Gordey has received formal chess training under the supervision of Andrey Obodchuk, who moved to Guangzhou specifically to train Gordey. Between November 2014 and April 2015, Gordey took part in several chess qualification tournaments. In April he won the qualification tournament in Shenzhen and earned the top rank in chess. Gordey received his champion's cup from Ye Jiangchuan, a Chinese grandmaster and the coach of several world champions, including the three-time women's chess champion (2010, 2011, 2013) and the youngest female grandmaster Hou Yifan. At the world schoolchildren's championship in Pattaya, Thailand (May 5–15, 2015), Gordey ranked among the top ten, achieving the best result among young Russian players in his age category.
