= Alexeyevskaya, Volgograd Oblast =

Alexeyevskaya Алексеевская
- Stanitsa
- Interactive map of Alexeyevskaya
- Location of Alexeyevskaya Alexeyevskaya (Volgograd Oblast)
- Coordinates: 50°17′N 42°12′E
- Country: Russia
- Federal subject: Volgograd Oblast
- Administrative district: Alexeyevsky District
- Elevation: 72 m (236 ft)

Population (2010 Census)
  - Total: 4,204
  - Estimate (2021): 3,677 (−12.5%)

Administrative status
  - Capital of: Alexeyevsky District
- Time zone: UTC+3 (MSK)
- Postal code: 403241
- OKTMO ID: 18602405101

Alexeyevskaya (Russian: Алексе́евская) is a rural locality (a stanitsa) and the administrative centre of Alexeyevsky District in Volgograd Oblast, Russia. Population: 3,677 (2021 census); 4,204 (2010 census); 4,196 (2002 census).
