= Alexeyevsky District, Volgograd Oblast =

Alexeyevsky District Алексеевский район (Russian)
- District
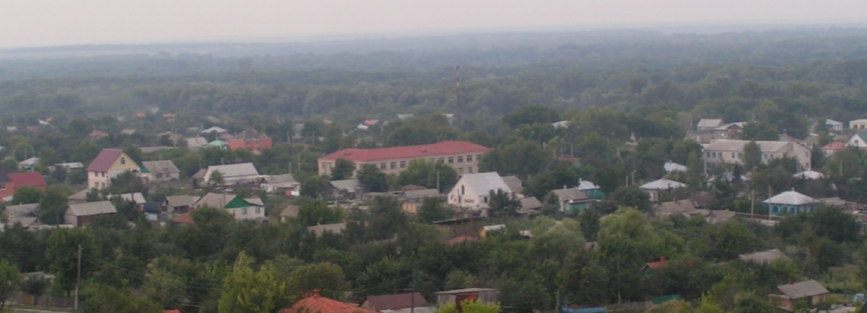
- The stanitsa of Arzhanovskaya in Alexeyevsky District

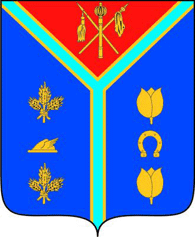
- Flag Coat of arms
- Location of Alexeyevsky District in Volgograd Oblast
- Coordinates: 50°17′N 42°11′E
- Country: Russia
- Federal subject: Volgograd Oblast
- Established: 23 June 1928
- Administrative center: Alexeyevskaya

Area
  - Total: 2,300 km^{2} (890 sq mi)

Population (2010 Census)
  - Total: 18,166
  - Density: 7.9/km^{2} (20/sq mi)
  - Urban: 0%
  - Rural: 100%

Administrative structure
  - Administrative divisions: 16 selsoviet
  - Inhabited localities: 61 rural localities

Municipal structure
  - Municipally incorporated as: Alexeyevsky Municipal District
  - Municipal divisions: 0 urban settlements, 15 rural settlements
- Time zone: UTC+3 (MSK)
- OKTMO ID: 18602000
- Website: http://alex-land.ru/

Alexeyevsky District (Russian: Алексе́евский райо́н) is an administrative district (raion), one of the thirty-three in Volgograd Oblast, Russia. Municipally, it is incorporated as Alexeyevsky Municipal District. It is located in the northwest of the oblast. The area of the district is 2,300 square kilometers (890 sq mi). Its administrative center is the rural locality (a stanitsa) of Alexeyevskaya. Population: 18,166 (2010 census); 19,189 (2002 Census); 20,039 (1989 Soviet census). The population of Alexeyevskaya accounts for 23.1% of the district's population.

== People ==
- Alexandr Kolesov (1922-1994)
