= List of foreign football players in Hong Kong First Division League =

This is a list of foreign football players in Hong Kong First Division League.

The following players must meet both of the following two criteria:

1. Have played at least one Hong Kong First Division League, Hong Kong Senior Challenge Shield, Hong Kong League Cup, Hong Kong FA Cup, Hong Kong Viceroy Cup or AFC club competition match for First Division club.
2. Are considered foreign, i.e., outside China, determined by the following:

A player is considered foreign if he is not eligible to play for the national teams of China, Hong Kong, Macau or Chinese Taipei.

The players in bold have at least one cap for their national team.

== Australia ==
- Engelo Rumora - Wofoo Tai Po
- Joel Wood - Tuen Mun Progoal

== Bangladesh ==
- **Kazi Salahuddin** - Caroline Hill FC

== Bolivia ==
- **José Castillo** - South China

== Bosnia and Herzegovina ==
- Milija Žižić - Kitchee

== Botswana ==
- Destiny O Ugo - Hong Kong FC

== Brazil ==
- Alexandre de Moraes - Rangers
- Alexandro Vieira Xavier - Rangers
- Jorginho - Citizen
- Dênisson Ricardo de Souza - Happy Valley
- Evanor - Happy Valley
- Fábio Lopes Alcântara - Happy Valley, Shatin
- Fabrício Lopes Alcântara - Happy Valley
- Ícaro Passos de Oliveira - Happy Valley
- José Ricardo Rambo - Happy Valley
- Juninho Petrolina - Happy Valley
- Vandré Sagrilo Monteiro - Happy Valley, South China
- Vítor - Happy Valley, Xiangxue Sun Hei
- Anderson da Silva - Kitchee
- Cleiton Mendes dos Santos - South China
- Detinho - South China, Citizen
- Edemar Antônio Picoli - South China, Eastern
- Michel Mesquita - South China
- Tales Schutz - South China
- Edgar Aldrighi Júnior - Wofoo Tai Po
- Joel Bertoti Padilha - Wofoo Tai Po
- Silvano Pessoa Monteiro - Wofoo Tai Po
- Carlo André Bielemann Hartwig- Xiangxue Sun Hei
- Giovane - Xiangxue Sun Hei, Convoy Sun Hei
- Lico - Xiangxue Sun Hei
- João Miguel - Xiangxue Sun Hei, Convoy Sun Hei
- Márcio Gabriel Anacleto - Xiangxue Sun Hei
- Celio Lino Oliveira - Bulova Rangers
- Siumar Ferreira Nazaré - Bulova Rangers, Eastern
- Leko - Citizen
- Márcio Francisco da Silva - Citizen
- Hélio José de Souza Gonçalves - Citizen
- Paulinho Piracicaba - Citizen
- Fábio Herbert de Souza - Convoy Sun Hei, Workable
- Carlos Roberto dos Santos - Convoy Sun Hei
- Edson José Jaguszeski - Convoy Sun Hei
- Mauricio Pizzi - Convoy Sun Hei
- Beto - Convoy Sun Hei
- Paulo Jerônimo Ribeiro Ferreira - Eastern
- Luciano Quadros da Silva - Eastern, Fourway Athletics, Kitchee
- Jéferson Machado de Oliveira - Eastern
- Djair Baptista **Machado** - Eastern
- Márcio da Silva Dias - Eastern
- Odair Hellmann - Eastern
- Paulo Henrique Miranda - Eastern, Fourway Athletics
- Rodrigo Andreis Galvão - Eastern
- Fábio Noronha de Oliveira - Happy Valley, TSW Pegasus
- Tomy Adriano Giacomeli - Happy Valley
- Diego Mendonça - Happy Valley
- Fagner Gomes dos Santos - Happy Valley, Citizen
- Domingos António Marcos - Happy Valley
- Washington Luiz Pereira Santos - Happy Valley
- Vandré Monteiro - Happy Valley
- Willian Carlos Magri - Lanwa Redbull
- Flavio Barros - South China
- Itaparica - South China, TSW Pegasus
- Maxwell - South China
- Sidraílson - South China
- Betine Rafael dos Santos - Wofoo Tai Po
- Diego Balbinot - Workable
- **Elisandro** Naressi Roos - Workable
- Roberto Fronza - Workable, TSW Pegasus
- Wilson Santos da Cruz - Workable
- Sandro - Citizen
- Paulo Rogério - Citizen
- Marlon Mário Brandão da Silveira - Citizen
- Max Suel da Cruz - Citizen
- Anderson Moreno dos Santos - Convoy Sun Hei
- Fabiano da Silva Diniz - Eastern
- Edson Bugrão - Fourway Athletics
- Sidicley Bernardo Nunes - Happy Valley
- Eduardo de Morais Iannareli Carvalho - Happy Valley
- Edson Ferreira da Silva - Sheffield United
- Luiz Antonio Linhares Garcia - TSW Pegasus
- Bruno Faifer Rubinato - Tuen Mun Progoal
- Rafinha - Citizen
- Neto - Shatin
- Pablo Camilo de Souza - Shatin
- Kahuê Rodrigues - Shatin
- Fábio Magrão - Shatin
- Maurício - Shatin
- Ivissson - Shatin
- Belém - Shatin
- Leandro Carrijo - South China
- Luiz Carlos - South China
- Leonardo Ferreira da Silva - South China
- Ramón - South China
- Sidraílson - South China
- Wellingsson - South China
- Cahê - Sun Hei
- Márcio Fábio Martins - TSW Pegasus
- Marinho - TSW Pegasus

== Cameroon ==
- Engelbert Romaric Asse-Etoga - Happy Valley
- Ghislain Bell Bell - Rangers
- Louis Berty Ayock - Rangers, Kitchee, TSW Pegasus
- Francis Bertrand Yonga - Kitchee
- Julius Akosah - Kitchee, Eastern
- Wilfred Bamnjo - Kitchee, Convoy Sun Hei,
- Jacques Martin Taninche Tchiegaing - Bulova Rangers
- Jean-Jacques Kilama - Bulova Rangers, Fourway Athletics
- Roger Batoum - Convoy Sun Hei
- Ewane Guy Martial Ngassa - Kitchee
- Hugues Naponick Nanmi - Kitchee, Tai Chung, NTR WF Tai Po
- Nkewoun Nicolas Dieune - Lanwa Redbull
- Pierre-Oliver Bakalag - Kitchee, Fourway Athletics
- Cyrille Bella - Kitchee
- Paul Ngue - Kitchee, Tai Chung
- Eugene Mbome - TSW Pegasus
- Guy Junior Ondoua - TSW Pegasus, Fourway Rangers
- Celistanus Tita Chou - Tuen Mun Progoal, Fourway Rangers
- Guy Hervé Mahop - Fourway Rangers
- Georges-Andre Machia - TSW Pegasus

== Chile ==
- Carlos Cáceres - Kitchee
- Gonzalo Sepúlveda - Kitchee
- Gustavo Zamudio - Kitchee

== Congo ==
- **Michel De Buisson** - Fourway Athletics
- **Edson Minga** - Bulova Rangers

== DR Congo ==
- **Muana Lukalu** - Fourway Athletics

== Chad ==
- **Ndolar Laoundoumaye Blaise** - Happy Valley

== Congo ==
- Delphin Tshibanda Tshibangu - Citizen

== England ==
- Jaimes McKee - Hong Kong FC, Kitchee
- Michael Anthony Sealy - Hong Kong FC
- Jack Sealy - Hong Kong FC, South China
- Kyle Alexander Jordan - Xiangxue Sun Hei
- Andrew Russell - Happy Valley
- Brett Storey - Shatin
- **Nicky Butt** - South China

== Equatorial Guinea ==
- **Raúl Fabiani** - Hong Kong Sapling
- **Baruc Nsue** - Kitchee
- **Ronan Carolino Falcão** - Citizen
- **Iván Zarandona** – Biu Chun Rangers

== France ==
- Gutenberg Nkounke - Bulova Rangers

== Georgia ==
- Giorgi Kobakhidze - Happy Valley

== Germany ==
- Heiner Backhaus - Kitchee

== Ghana ==
- Godfred Karikari - Rangers, Happy Valley
- Wisdom Fofo Agbo - Rangers, TSW Pegasus
- Anthony Dela Nyatepe - Citizen, Mutual FC, Tai Chung
- Yaw Anane - Citizen, South China, Mutual FC, Happy Valley
- Moses Mensah - Citizen
- Stephen Joseph Musah - Citizen
- Christian Annan - Wofoo Tai Po
- Bishop Sarpong Owusu - Bulova Rangers
- Charles Ghansa Benin - Mutual FC, Happy Valley
- Ayo Hassan Raimi - Tuen Mun Progoal
- Francis Oppong - NTR WF Tai Po

== Guinea ==
- Mamoudou Cissé - Happy Valley

== Hungary ==
- Zoltán Ghéczy - Shatin

== India ==
- Manprit Singh – Wofoo Tai Po, Hong Kong FC, Rangers
- Hardikpreet Singh – Hong Kong FC
- Deepak Sharma – Wong Tai Sin DRSC
- Navaldeep Singh – Eastern District SA

== Ireland ==
- Colin Baker - Rangers, Hong Kong FC
- Peter Foley - Bulova SA
- Terry Conroy - Bulova SA

== Japan ==
- Hisanori Takada - Eastern, Bulova Rangers, Citizen
- Tomoaki Seino - Convoy Sun Hei
- Asahi Yamamoto - Fourway Athletics, Sun Hei
- Yuto Nakamura - TSW Pegasus
- **Masayuki Okano** - TSW Pegasus
- Dan Ito - Tuen Mun Progoal
- Takashi Fujii - Shatin, Sun Hei

== Macedonia ==
- **Goran Stankovski** - Kitchee

== Malawi ==
- **Elvis Kafoteka** - Bulova Rangers

== Nigeria ==
- Festus Baise - Citizen
- Cornelius Udebuluzor - Rangers
- Victor Eromosele Inegbenoise - Xiangxue Sun Hei
- Donatus Chinedu Aghadinuno - Bulova Rangers, Mutual FC
- Caleb Ekwenugo - Convoy Sun Hei, Bulova Rangers, Fourway Athletics, NTR WF Tai Po
- David Ifeanyi Godwin - Lanwa Redbull, Sheffield United
- Alexander Akande - Eastern, Tai Chung, Kitchee
- Eze Isiocha - Happy Valley
- Ande Apollo - Mutual FC
- Tunde Seun Olokigbe - Tuen Mun Progoal
- Emmanuel John - Tuen Mun Progoal

== Paraguay ==
- Aldo Arsenio Villalba Torres - Lanwa Redbull
- Aníbal Pacheco Orzuza - Lanwa Redbull

== Peru ==
- **Antonio Serrano** - Xiangxue Sun Hei

== Portugal ==
- André Correia - South China
- Carlos Miguel da Silva Oliveira - South China
- Hugo Nunes Coelho - South China
- Marco Antonio Mendes de Almeida - South China
- Luciano Guedes Brandao da Rocha - Bulova Rangers
- Nuno Miguel Mendes Cavaleiro - South China, Bulova Rangers

== Romania ==
- Petrișor Voinea - TSW Pegasus

== Russia ==
- Torin William Didenko - Hong Kong FC

== Saint Kitts and Nevis ==
- **Keith Gumbs** - Kitchee

== Serbia ==
- Dragutin Stević-Ranković - Rangers
- Ivan Jević - Kitchee
- Darko Rakočević - Kitchee
- Mihailo Jovanović - Rangers, South China
- Pavle Lakić - Happy Valley
- Nemanja Simović - Happy Valley
- Mirko Teodorović - Shatin

== South Africa ==
- Saleh Amisi - Fourway Athletics
- Makhosonke Erol Bhengu - Fourway Rangers
- Sthembiso Nkanyiso Sboniso Ntombela - Fourway Rangers

== South Korea ==
- Kim Yeon-Gun - South China

== Spain ==
- Ernesto Gómez
- Sergio Aure - Kitchee
- Ubay Luzardo - Kitchee
- Javi Pérez - Kitchee
- Raúl Torres - Kitchee
- Albert Virgili - Kitchee

== Togo ==
- **Cristiano Alves Pereira** - South China

== Uruguay ==
- Luis Daniel Cupla Oviedo - Kitchee
- Enrique Díaz - Kitchee

== Wales ==
- Richard David Jeffries - Hong Kong FC
- Morgan Powell - Hong Kong FC

== Unknown nationality ==
- Kevin Benjamin Buchanan - Hong Kong FC
- Michael John Challoner - Hong Kong FC
- Michael Paul Hampshire - Eastern

== See also ==
- Hong Kong First Division League
- Hong Kong Senior Shield
- Hong Kong League Cup
- Hong Kong FA Cup
- Hong Kong Viceroy Cup
- Hong Kong League XI
- Guangdong-Hong Kong Cup
- Lunar New Year Cup
