= 2007–08 South China AA season =

South China
2007–08 season
- Chairman: (Hong Kong) (Macau) Steven Lo (Football Management Committee)
- Head coach: (Portugal) José Luís
- Hong Kong First Division: 1st
- Senior Shield: Semi-finals
- League Cup: Winners
- FA Cup: Semi-finals
- AFC Cup 2008: Group stage
- Top goalscorer: League: (Brazil) Detinho (19); All: (Brazil) Detinho (26)

The 2007–08 season is South China's 2nd year after giving up the all-Chinese policy. This article shows statistics of the club's players in the season, and also lists all matches that the club have and will play in the season.

== Events ==
- On the 24 July 2007, South China were beaten 3-1 by Liverpool in the Barclays Asia Trophy 2007. Liverpool goals were scored by John Arne Riise, Xabi Alonso and Daniel Agger. South China's goal was scored by Li Haiqiang who found the net by curving the ball from 46 yards into the top left corner.
- On the 27 July 2007, Fulham beat South China 4-1 in the 3rd place play-off. South China pull one back after 56 minutes when Li Haiqiang’s quickly taken free-kick was volleyed home in impressive fashion by Flavio Barros.
- On November 27, 2008, Hong Kong Red Cross officially entered a charity partnership with the club and its logo will be printed on SCAA team jerseys, extending and spreading humanity everywhere the team goes. The charity partnership is a pioneer between a sports association and a humanitarian organization in Hong Kong.
- On March 9, 2008, an All-Star team primarily consisting of SCAA players (credited as Hong Kong Union) hosted a friendly versus Los Angeles Galaxy in the MLS side's last match in their preseason tour of Asia. The Hong Kong side won the penalty shootout 5-4 after drawing 2-2 in regulation.

== Players ==
=== Squad stats ===
				Total			First Division		Senior Shield		League Cup		FA Cup		AFC Cup	
No.	Pos.	Nat.	Name	Sts	App	Gls	App	Gls	App	Gls	App	Gls	App	Gls	App	Gls
1	GK	(Hong Kong)	Chung Ho Yin	3	4		1				1				2	
12	GK	(Hong Kong)	Siu Leong													
16	GK	(China)	Zhang Jianzhong	2	2		1				1					
23	GK	(China)	Zhang Chunhui	29	29		16		2		4		2		5	
31	GK	(Hong Kong)	Chan Chun Yu													
2	DF	(Hong Kong)	Lee Chi Ho	28	29	1	15	1	2		6		2		4	
3	DF	(Brazil)	Sidraílson	17	18		11		2		3		2			
4	DF	(China)	Deng Jianzhong	5	12		5				2				5	
6	DF	(Hong Kong)	Wong Chin Hung	31	33	1	18	1	2		5		2		6	
14	DF	(Hong Kong)	Chan Ka Chun	1	1										1	
15	DF	(Hong Kong)	Chan Wai Ho	28	26	1	15	1	1		4		1		5	
21	DF	(Hong Kong)	Man Pei Tak	24	27		14		2		6		1		4	
22	DF	(Hong Kong)	Lai Man Fei	4	5										5	
25	DF	(Togo)	Cris	24	27	5	12	2	1		6		2		6	3
5	MF	(China)	Bai He	9	19		12		2		4		1			
8	MF	(Hong Kong)	Yeung Ching Kwong	6	14		5				2		1		6	
9	MF	(Hong Kong)	Cheng King Ho													
11	MF	(China)	Li Haiqiang	24	25	4	16	3	2		5	1	2			
13	MF	(Hong Kong)	Chan Chi Hong	15	21	1	10	1	1		5		2		3	
17	MF	(China)	Du Ping	1	2		2									
18	MF	(Hong Kong)	Kwok Kin Pong	11	22	4	10	3	2	1	3		2		5	
20	MF	(Hong Kong)	Yip Chi Ho	?	12	1	5				1	1			6	
24	MF	(Brazil)	J. Petrolina													
24	MF	(Portugal)	Nuno	2	3		1		2							
26	MF	(Brazil)	Itaparica	21	26	5	16	3	2		6	1	2	1		
39	MF	(China)	Fan Weijun	22	22	1	11				4	1	2		5	
19	FW	(Hong Kong)	Cheng Siu Wai	6	21	5	13	2			2				6	3
9	FW	(Brazil)	Barros		1		1									
27	FW	(Brazil)	Maxwell	26	26	15	17	11	2		6	4	1			
28	FW	(Brazil)	Schütz	15	18	8	7	4			5	3	1		5	1
30	FW	(Brazil)	Detinho	24	29	26	16	19	2	3	4	4	2		5	

Last updated: 12 April
Ordered by start team and position on pitch (from back right to front left)
0 shown as blank

=== Players in/out ===
==== In ====
- (Hong Kong) Wong Chin Hung (黃展鴻) from Rangers
- (Hong Kong) Yip Chi Ho (葉志豪) from Rangers
- (Brazil) Flavio Barros (巴路士) from Vila Nova Futebol Clube (loan)
- (Brazil) Sidrailson (沙域臣) from Santa Cruz (Brazilian Pernambuco Football Championship Série A1) (loan)
- (Brazil) Juninho Petrolina (S·祖利亞) from Central (Brazilian Campeonato Pernambucano Série A1 / Campeonato Brasileiro Série C)
- (China) (Hong Kong) Fan Weijun (樊偉軍) from Rangers
- (China) Du Ping (杜蘋) from Shaanxi Baorong (Chinese Super League) (loan)
- (Togo) (Brazil) Cris (基斯) from Metropolitano (Brazilian Campeonato Catarinense) (loan)
- (Brazil) Itaparica (伊達) from Paysandu (loan)
- (Brazil) Maxwell (麥士維) from Riffa Club (Bahraini Premier League)
- (Portugal) Nuno (盧諾) from Moreirense FC (Portuguese Second Division Serie A)
- (Hong Kong) Chung Ho Yin (鍾皓賢) from Eastern (return from loan)
- (Brazil) Tales Schütz (T·史高斯) from Leixões (Portuguese Liga)

==== Out ====
- (Brazil) Edemar Picoli (比高) to Eastern
- (Togo) (Brazil) Cris (基斯) to Metropolitano (return from loan)
- (Ghana) Yaw Anane (友友) to Citizen (return from loan)
- (Brazil) Cleiton (基頓) to Santa Cruz (return from loan)
- (Serbia) Mihailo Jovanović (袓雲奴域) (released)
- (Hong Kong) Wong Chun Yue (黃鎮宇) (released)
- (Hong Kong) Au Wai Lun (歐偉倫) (retired)
- (Brazil) Tales Schütz (T·史高斯) to Grêmio Inhumense (Brazilian Campeonato Goiano) (return from loan)
- (Hong Kong) Chung Ho Yin (鍾皓賢) to Eastern (loan)
- (Brazil) Juninho Petrolina (S·祖利亞) to ABC (Brazilian Campeonato Potiguar / Campeonato Brasileiro Série C)
- (China) Liang Zicheng (梁子成) to Rangers (loan)
- (Brazil) Flavio Barros (巴路士) to Vila Nova (return from loan)
- (China) Du Ping (杜蘋) (released)
- (Portugal) Nuno (盧諾) to Rangers

== Club ==
=== Coaching staff ===
Position	Staff
Head coach	(Portugal) José Luís

=== Kit ===
Supplier: Adidas
Sponsor(s): PCCW (main sponsor)
Features: Hong Kong Red Cross

Source: southchinafc.com

== Competitions ==
=== Hong Kong First Division League ===
==== Results by round ====
Round	1	2	3	4	5	6	7	8	9	10	11	12	13	14	15	16	17	18
Ground	H	A	A	H	A	H	A	H	A	A	H	H	A	H	A	H	A	H
Result	L	W	W	W	D	D	W	W	W	W	W	W	W	L	L	D	L	W

Updated to match(es) played on 31 May. Source: Competitive Matches
A = Away; H = Home; W = Win; D = Draw; L = Loss

== Matches ==
=== Hong Kong First Division ===
Game	Date	Tournament	Round	Ground	Opponent	Score^{1}	Report
1	2 September	First Division	1	HR	Kitchee	1 – 2	HKFA.com
2	15 September	First Division	2	A (China)	Lanwa Redbull (China)	3 – 1	
3	22 September	First Division	3	A	Eastern	2 – 0	
4	26 September	First Division	4	HR	Workable	6 – 1	
5	5 October	First Division	5	A	Happy Valley	1 – 1	
6	13 October	First Division	6	H	Citizen	0 – 0	
7	2 November	First Division	7	A	Bulova Rangers	9 – 1	
8	13 November	First Division	8	HR	Wofoo Tai Po	6 – 1	
9	29 November	First Division	9	A	Convoy Sun Hei	2 – 1	
10	14 December	First Division	10	A	Kitchee	5 – 0	
11	11 January	First Division	11	H	Lanwa Redbull (China)	4 – 1	
12	24 February	First Division	12	H	Eastern	2 – 0	
14	29 March	First Division	14	H	Happy Valley	0 – 2	
15	5 April	First Division	15	A	Citizen	1 – 2	
13	9 April	First Division	13	A	Workable	4 – 1	
16	12 April	First Division	16	H	Bulova Rangers	0 – 0	
17	22 April	First Division	17	A	Wofoo Tai Po	1 – 2	
18	27 April	First Division	18	H	Convoy Sun Hei	4 – 1	

Last updated: 31 May 2008
^{1}South China goals come first.
National flags for Ground and Opponent columns are only shown when different from that of South China.
M = Match; Ground: H = Home, A = Away, N = Neutral, HR = Home replacement, AR = Away replacement.

=== Senior Shield ===
25 November 2007 Quarter-finals	South China AA	6 – 1	Wofoo Tai Po	Mong Kok, Kowloon, Hong Kong
				Stadium: Mong Kok Stadium

8 December 2007 Quarter-finals	South China AA	1 – 2	Kitchee	Mong Kok, Kowloon, Hong Kong
				Stadium: Mong Kok Stadium

=== League Cup ===
19 January 2008 Group stage	South China AA	0 – 1	Workable	Mong Kok, Kowloon, Hong Kong
				Stadium: Mong Kok Stadium

29 January 2008 Group stage	South China AA	3 – 1	Wofoo Tai Po	Mong Kok, Kowloon, Hong Kong
				Stadium: Mong Kok Stadium

3 February 2008 Group stage	South China AA	2 – 1	Kitchee	Siu Sai Wan, Hong Kong
				Stadium: Siu Sai Wan Sports Ground

17 February 2008 Group stage	South China AA	4 – 2	Happy Valley	Mong Kok, Kowloon, Hong Kong
				Stadium: Mong Kok Stadium

2 March 2008 Semi-finals	South China AA	1 – 0	Eastern	Mong Kok, Kowloon, Hong Kong
				Stadium: Mong Kok Stadium

24 March 2008 Final	South China AA	4 – 2	Kitchee	Mong Kok, Kowloon, Hong Kong
				Stadium: Mong Kok Stadium

=== AFC Cup ===
11 March 2008 Group stage	South China AA (Hong Kong)	2 – 3	(Singapore) Home United	Mong Kok, Kowloon, Hong Kong
				Stadium: Mong Kok Stadium

18 March 2008 Group stage	Victory SC (Maldives)	0 – 0	(Hong Kong) South China AA	Malé, Maldives
				Stadium: Galolhu National Stadium

2 April 2008 Group stage	South China AA (Hong Kong)	1 – 2	(Malaysia) Kedah	Mong Kok, Kowloon, Hong Kong
				Stadium: Mong Kok Stadium

16 April 2008 Group stage	Kedah (Malaysia)	1 – 4	(Hong Kong) South China AA	Kedah, Malaysia
				Stadium: Darul Aman Stadium

30 April 2008 Group stage	Home United (Singapore)	4 – 1	(Hong Kong) South China AA	Kallang, Singapore
				Stadium: Jalan Besar Stadium

14 May 2008 Group stage	South China AA (Hong Kong)	3 – 0	(Maldives) Victory SC	Mong Kok, Kowloon, Hong Kong
				Stadium: Mong Kok Stadium

=== FA Cup ===
4 May 2008 Group stage	South China AA	1 – 0	Convoy Sun Hei	Mong Kok, Kowloon, Hong Kong
				Stadium: Mong Kok Stadium

10 May 2008 Group stage	South China AA	1 – 2	Wofoo Tai Po	Mong Kok, Kowloon, Hong Kong
				Stadium: Mong Kok Stadium
