= 2006–07 in Hong Kong football =

Hong Kong football season

The 2006–07 season in Hong Kong football, starting July 2006 and ending June 2007:

== Overview ==
The number of teams in the First Division increased from eight to ten, as the HKFA decided to keep the two bottom teams from the last season, South China and Hong Kong 08, in the First Division, while HKFC and Wofoo Tai Po were promoted.

Wofoo Tai Po, who earned promotion to the First Division by finishing second in the Second Division, played their first ever season in the top division of Hong Kong football.

== Events ==
- 21 July 2006 – Tim Bredbury took over as head coach of Rangers, replacing Qiu Jingwei.
- 1 August 2006 – Portuguese Jorge Amaral took over as head coach of South China.
- 13 August 2006 – Kitchee played Chinese Super League club Shanghai Shenhua in a pre-season exhibition match, Canon Cup, at the Hong Kong Stadium. After a 1–1 draw in regulation time with the home team, Shenhua requested to cancel to take the penalty shootout. The title was shared.
- 2 September 2006 – The First Division League season began with Happy Valley and Xiangxue Sun Hei drawing 1–1.
- 19 September 2006 – Xiangxue Sun Hei were beaten by Jordanian Al-Faisaly 2–2 (4–5 on penalties), in the AFC Cup quarter-final.
- 25 September 2006 – Rangers sacked head coach Tim Bredbury after a 1–1 draw at Happy Valley. Cheung Wai Hong took over as caretaker coach.
- 11 October 2006 – Brazilian-born defender Cristiano Preigchadt Cordeiro made his international debut for Hong Kong in the 2007 AFC Asian Cup qualifying match against Qatar.
- 4 November 2006 – Kitchee, the last unbeaten team in the First Division League up that time, lost 2–0 to South China at Mong Kok.
- 15 November 2006 – Hong Kong played the last game in their 2007 AFC Asian Cup qualifying round group F against Bangladesh. After two wins and two draws in six games, Hong Kong ended third in the group.
- 30 November 2006 – Brazilian Casemiro Mior was appointed new head coach of South China, replacing Jorge Amaral.
- 10 December 2006 – The Senior Shield kicked off, with HKFC beating Hong Kong 08 2–1 in the first round.
- 12 December 2006 – Former England international midfielder Steve McManaman visited Hong Kong at the invitation of Rangers chairman Carson Yeung Ka Shing.

== Representative team ==
=== Hong Kong team ===
For all-time list, see Hong Kong national football team results

Hong Kong have gone through their Asian Cup 2007 qualifying campaign, where they ended 3rd in group F.

Date	Venue	Opponents	Score	Comp	Hong Kong scorers	Match Report(s)
12 August 2006	Hong Kong Stadium (H)	Singapore	1–2	F	Lee Sze Ming	HKFA; FAS sleague.com
16 August 2006	Pakhtakor Stadium (A)	Uzbekistan	2–2	ACQ07	Sham Kwok Keung (2)	AFC
6 September 2006	Hong Kong Stadium (H)	Uzbekistan	0–0	ACQ07	–	AFC; HKFA
11 October 2006	Al Gharrafa Stadium (A)	Qatar	0–2	ACQ07	–	AFC
15 November 2006	Mong Kok Stadium (H)	Bangladesh	2–0	ACQ07	Gerard Ambassa Guy (2)	AFC; HKFA
1 June 2007	Indonesia (A)	Indonesia	0–3	F	–	
19 June 2007	Macau (N)	Chinese Taipei	1–1	EAC08Q	Lo Chi Kwan	
21 June 2007	Macau (N)	Guam	15–1	EAC08Q	Chan Siu Ki (5); Lo Kwan Yee (2); Poon Yiu Cheuk; Cheng Siu Wai; Lo Chi Kwan; Cordeiro; Dominic Gadia (o.g.); Law Chun Bong; Ambassa Guy; Luk Koon Pong	
24 June 2007	Macau (N)	North Korea	0–1	EAC08Q	–	

=== Hong Kong futsal team ===
2007 AFC Futsal Championship

- 13 May 2007 – Tajikistan 6–4 Hong Kong
- 14 May 2007 – Hong Kong 0–8 Japan
- 15 May 2007 – Hong Kong 3–2 Philippines

=== Hong Kong U-23 ===
2006 Asian Games

- 29 November 2006 – India 1–1 Hong Kong
- 3 December 2006 – Hong Kong 1–2 Iran
- 6 December 2006 – Hong Kong 1–0 Maldives

Guangdong-Hong Kong Cup

- 30 December 2006 – Guangdong 1–0 Hong Kong
- 7 January 2007 – Hong Kong 3–2 (4–2 Extra Time) Guangdong

Hong Kong captured the championship of 29th Guangdong-Hong Kong Cup

2008 Olympic Games Qualifying

Preliminary Round

- 7 February 2007 – Bangladesh 0–3 Hong Kong
- 14 February 2007 – Hong Kong 0–1 Bangladesh

Second Round (Group B)

- 28 February 2007 – Japan 3–0 Hong Kong
- 14 March 2007 – Hong Kong 0–2 Syria
- 28 March 2007 – Hong Kong 0–1 Malaysia
- 18 April 2007 – Malaysia 0–1 Hong Kong
- 16 May 2007 – Hong Kong 0–4 Japan
- 6 June 2007 – Syria vs Hong Kong

=== Hong Kong U-19 ===
AFC U19 Youth Championship Qualification Competition 2007

=== Hong Kong U-16 ===
AFC U16 Youth Championship Qualification Competition 2007

=== Hong Kong U-14 ===
EAFF U-14 Youth Festival 2006 held in China

- 21 July 2006 – Hong Kong 4–0 Guam
- 21 July 2006 – Japan 1–4 Hong Kong
- 21 July 2006 – Hong Kong 3–0 Mongolia
- 22 July 2006 – Hong Kong 0–3 China
- 22 July 2006 – Macau 0–3 Hong Kong
- 22 July 2006 – South Korea 1–0 Hong Kong
- 22 July 2006 – Hong Kong 0–1 Chinese Taipei
- 23 July 2006 – Northern Mariana Islands 0–7 Hong Kong
- 23 July 2006 – Hong Kong 1–0 North Korea
- 25 July 2006 – Hong Kong 1–0 Chinese Taipei

=== Hong Kong U-13 ===
2007 AFC (U13) Festival of Football held in Beijing, China

- 14 April 2007 – South Korea 8–0 Hong Kong
- 14 April 2007 – Hong Kong 0–2 Japan
- 14 April 2007 – China 0–0 Hong Kong
- 15 April 2007 – Mongolia 0–4 Hong Kong
- 15 April 2007 – Hong Kong 1–3 Chinese Taipei
- 15 April 2007 – Guam 0–4 Hong Kong
- 17 April 2007 – Hong Kong 7–0 Macau
- 17 April 2007 – Hong Kong 0–5 North Korea
- 18 April 2007 – China 3–1 Hong Kong

== Honours ==
Competition	Winner	Details	Match Report
First Division	South China	First Division 2006–07	
League Cup	Kitchee	League Cup 2006–07	
Senior Shield	South China	Senior Shield 2006–07	
FA Cup	South China	FA Cup 2006–07	
Second Division	Tung Po	Second Division 2006–07	
Third 'A' Division	Tuen Mun F.C.		
Third 'District' Division	Hong Kong 09		

== Asian clubs competitions ==
=== AFC Cup 2006 ===
- Xiangxue Sun Hei – Quarter finals
- Happy Valley – Group phase

=== AFC Cup 2007 ===
- Happy Valley
- Xiangxue Sun Hei

== Exhibition Matches ==
=== Canon Cup ===
12 August 2006
20:15

Kitchee	1–1	Shanghai Shenhua
Xiao Zhanbo 35' (o.g.)	(in Chinese)	Julius Akosah 44' (o.g.)

Hong Kong Stadium, Hong Kong
Attendance: 4,667
Referee: Fong Yau Fat

KITCHEE:
GK	1	(China) Wang Zhenpeng
MF	6	(China) Gao Wen
FW	9	(Cameroon) Julius Akosah		(substituted off) 60'
MF	10	(Cameroon) Wilfed Bamnjo
FW	11	(Saint Kitts and Nevis) Keith Gumbs	(yellow card) 30'
MF	14	(Hong Kong) Liu Quankun
MF	15	(Hong Kong) Szeto Man Chun	(yellow card) 40'
DF	16	(Hong Kong) Luk Koon Pong
DF	20	(Serbia) Darko Rakočević
DF	21	(Serbia) Ivan Jević
DF	25	(Hong Kong) Leung Chi Wing		(substituted off) 53'
Substitutions:
GK	23	(Hong Kong) Goldbert Chi Chiu
GK	26	(China) Li Jian
DF	3	(China) Lin Junsheng
DF	13	(Hong Kong) Cheung Kin Fung		(substituted on) 53'
FW	18	(Hong Kong) Chan Siu Ki
FW	19	(Hong Kong) Cheng Lai Hin
MF	28	(Hong Kong) Kwok Yue Hung		(substituted on) 60'
Coach:

SHANGHAI SHENHUA:
GK	12	(China) Zhou Yajun
	4	(China) Li Yinan		(substituted off) 46'
DF	6	(Hong Kong) Ng Wai Chiu		(substituted off) 58'
MF	7	(China) Xiao Zhanbo		(substituted off) 36'
FW	9	(Honduras) Luis Ramírez		(substituted off) 58'
MF	11	(Serbia) Ivan Jovanović
	13	(China) Cheng Liang
MF	16	(China) Yu Tao		(substituted off) 17'
	19	(China) Li Chengming	(yellow card) 38'
	26	(China) Wang Hongliang
FW	35	(Germany) Carsten Jancker		(substituted off) 73'
Substitutions:
GK	21	(China) Qiu Shengjiong
	3	(China) Liu Yinlao		(substituted on) 73'
	8	(China) Xie Hui		(substituted on) 58'
	15	(China) Wang Ke		(substituted on) 17'
	17	(China) Sun Ji		(substituted on) 46'
	18	(China) Zheng Kewei		(substituted on) 36'
	20	(China) Chen Lei		(substituted on) 58'
Coach:

== Transfer deals ==
=== Transfers ===
Updated 21 May 2007

1 July 2006

- (Hong Kong) Xiao Guoji from Kitchee to Rangers
- (Hong Kong) Chiu Chun Kit from Rangers to Wofoo Tai Po

3 July 2006

- (Hong Kong) So Loi Keung from Rangers to Wofoo Tai Po

4 July 2006

- (Hong Kong) Poon Man Tik from Xiangxue Sun Hei to Happy Valley
- (Brazil) Marcio Gabriel Anacleto from Rangers to Xiangxue Sun Hei
- (Hong Kong) Li Hon Ho from Xiangxue Sun Hei to Wofoo Tai Po
- (Ghana) Christian Kwesi Annan from Eastern to Wofoo Tai Po
- (India) (Hong Kong) Manprit Singh from HKFC to Wofoo Tai Po
- Lo Chun Kit from Citizen to Hong Kong 08

11 July 2006

- (Hong Kong) Li Chun Yip from Happy Valley to Citizen, loan
- (Hong Kong) Fung Chun Ting from Happy Valley to Citizen, loan

13 July 2006

- (Hong Kong) Man Pei Tak from Rangers to South China

14 July 2006

- (Hong Kong) Leung Chi Wing from Xiangxue Sun Hei to Kitchee
- (Hong Kong) Luk Koon Pong from South China to Kitchee

15 July 2006

- (Hong Kong) Li Hang Wui from Citizen to Kitchee
- (Hong Kong) Ha Shing Chi from South China to HKFC
- Zhang Chunghui from Rangers to South China

16 July 2006

- Wei Zhao from South China to Rangers
- (Hong Kong) Tse Man Wing from South China to Xiangxue Sun Hei

22 July 2006

- (Hong Kong) Leung Tsz Chun from South China to Rangers

23 July 2006

- (Hong Kong) Fung Ka Ki from Kitchee to Rangers

27 July 2006

- (Ghana) Stephen Joseph Musah from Lanwa Redbull to Citizen
- (Republic of the Congo) Delphin Tshibanda Tshibangu from Lanwa Redbull to Citizen
- (Cameroon) Julius Akosah from Xiangxue Sun Hei to Kitchee

31 July 2006

- (Brazil) Vítor Hugo to Happy Valley

1 August 2006

- (Portugal) Marco Almeida to South China
- (Portugal) Carlos Oliveira to South China
- (Portugal) Hugo Coelho to South China
- (Portugal) André Correia to South China
- (Brazil) Detinho to South China
- (Macau) Rineo Sousa to South China, trial
- Li Haiqiang from Chengdu Wuniu to South China, loan
- Tang Jinkai from Chengdu Wuniu to South China, loan

2 August 2006

- (China) Ju Yingzhi from Dalian Shide to Citizen, loan

4 August 2006

- (Brazil) Alex Xavier to Rangers

14 August 2006

- (Brazil) Tales Schutz to South China, loan
- (Hong Kong) (Nigeria) Lawrence Akandu from Tung Po to HKFC
- (Hong Kong) Leung Kam Fai from Happy Valley to Wofoo Tai Po

18 August 2006

- (Croatia) Ivan Cop to Xiangxue Sun Hei, trial

22 August 2006

- (Hong Kong) Lee Wai Tik from South China to HKFC
- (Hong Kong) Pau Ka Yiu from Xiangxue Sun Hei to HKFC

28 August 2006

- Chan Hon Hing from Hong Kong 08 to HKFC
- (Brazil) Michel Platini Ferreira Mesquita from Grêmio to South China, loan

31 August 2006

- (Hong Kong) Tung Ho Yin from Rangers to Xiangxue Sun Hei

10 September 2006

- (China) Yu Yang to Rangers

16 September 2006

- (Cameroon) Ayock Louis Berty to Rangers
- (Hong Kong) Cheng Lai Hin from Kitchee to HKFC, loan

27 September 2006

- (Brazil) Edgar Aldrighi Junior to Wofoo Tai Po
- (Brazil) Joel Bertoti Padilha to Wofoo Tai Po
- (Brazil) Silvano Pessoa Monteiro to Wofoo Tai Po

29 September 2006

- (India) (Hong Kong) Manprit Singh from Wofoo Tai Po to HKFC

6 October 2006

- (England) Kyle Jordan from Sheffield Wednesday to Xiangxue Sun Hei, loan

20 October 2006

- (Serbia) Mihailo Jovanović to Rangers
- (Australia) Engelo Rumora to Wofoo Tai Po

3 November 2006

- Bai He from Chengdu Wuniu to South China, loan
- Zhang Jianzhong from Guangzhou Pharmaceutical to South China
- (Brazil) Vítor Hugo from Happy Valley to Xiangxue Sun Hei

9 November 2006

- (Russia) Torin William Didenko to HKFC
- (Serbia) Mihailo Jovanović from Rangers to South China
- (Botswana) Destiny O Ugo from Fukien AA to HKFC
- (Hong Kong) Li Hang Wui from Kitchee to HKFC, loan

17 November 2006

- (Brazil) Ícaro to Happy Valley
- (Brazil) Vandré to Happy Valley
- (Brazil) Joao Miguel Pinto da Silva to Xiangxue Sun Hei
- (India) (Hong Kong) Manprit Singh from HKFC to Rangers

24 November 2006

- (Cameroon) Ghislain Bell Bell to Rangers
- (Togo) (Brazil) Cristiano Alves Pereira to South China
- (Hong Kong) (Nigeria) Colly Barnes Ezeh from Happy Valley to Xiangxue Sun Hei

6 December 2006

- (Finland) Petri Jalava to South China, trial

9 December 2006

- (China) Li Ming to Happy Valley
- (Cameroon) Engelbert Romaric Asse-Etoga to Happy Valley
- (Chad) Blaise Ndolar to Happy Valley

15 December 2006

- (Nigeria) Victor Inegbenoise to Xiangxue Sun Hei
- (Republic of Ireland) Colin Baker to Rangers, trial

12 January 2007

- (Brazil) Jorginho to Citizen
- (Brazil) Waldir to South China
- (Brazil) Picoli to South China
- Liang Zicheng to South China
- (China) Wang Gang to Lanwa Redbull
- (China) Duan Gaoyuan to Lanwa Redbull
- (China) Luo Jing to Lanwa Redbull
- (Cameroon) Francis Yonga to Kitchee
- (Nigeria) Cornelius Udebuluzor to Rangers

23 January 2007

- (Wales) Richard Jeffries to HKFC

2 March 2007

- (China) Liu Lei to Lanwa Redbull
- (China) Wang Fengqing to Lanwa Redbull
- (China) Zhang Sheng to Lanwa Redbull
- (Hong Kong) Chan Chun Yu to South China
- (Brazil) Anderson da Silva to Kitchee
- (China) Ye Jia to Rangers
- (Brazil) Alexandre de Moraes to Rangers

15 March 2007

- (Republic of the Congo) Delphin Tshibanda Tshibangu to Citizen
- (Ghana) Yaw Anane from Citizen to South China

16 March 2007

- (Hong Kong) Cheung Tsz Kin from Kitchee to HKFC, loan
- (Hong Kong) Lo Chi Hin from Kitchee to HKFC, loan
- (Ghana) Wisdom Fofo Agbo to Rangers
- (Hong Kong) Hon Kwok Chun to Wofoo Tai Po
- (Hong Kong) Li Shu San to Wofoo Tai Po

17 March 2007

- (Republic of Ireland) Colin Baker from Rangers to HKFC
- (Hong Kong) Tam Kwok Fu to Wofoo Tai Po
- (Peru) Antonio Serrano to Xiangxue Sun Hei

17 March 2007

- (Hong Kong) (England) Jaimes McKee from HKFC to Kitchee
- (Hong Kong) Lai Kai Cheuk from Shek Kip Mei to Xiangxue Sun Hei
- (Brazil) Juninho Petrolina to Happy Valley
- (Brazil) Marcão to Happy Valley
- (Brazil) Denisson to Happy Valley
- (Brazil) Cleiton Mendes dos Santos to South China
- (Hong Kong) Chan Wai Ho from Rangers to South China, HKD$40k

== Deaths ==
- Yuen Kuen Tao, 63, former Hong Kong international.
- Henry Fok, 83, former member of FIFA's executive committee HKFA's Life Honorary President.
