= 2006–07 South China AA season =

South China
2006–07 season
- Chairman: (Hong Kong) (Macau) Steven Lo (Football Management Committee)
- Head coach: (Brazil) Casemiro Mior
- Hong Kong First Division: 1st
- Senior Shield: Winners
- League Cup: Semi-finals
- FA Cup: Winners
- Top goalscorer: League: (Brazil) Tales Schütz (17); All: (Brazil) Tales Schütz (24)

== Events ==
- On 21 January 2007, the club beat Xiangxue Sun Hei by 2–1 in the final of Hong Kong Senior Shield 2006–07 final at the Hong Kong Stadium. This was the first trophy for the team since winning the Shield in 2003 and the first for convenor Steven Lo Kit Shing since his return to the club in August. By winning the Shield, the team won a place to represent Hong Kong in the AFC Cup 2008.
- On 23 February 2007, SCAA beat the guest team Yokohama F. Marinos of J. League in an exhibition competition called the BMA Cup. SCAA won over the Japanese side by an aggregate 6–5 after penalty shootout in front of a crowd of 21,355. See here for details of the match.
- On 11 March 2007, SCAA were beaten 1–2 by Kitchee in extra time in the semi-final of the League Cup. On 15 April 2007, SCAA played to a 1–1 draw with Kitchee in the penultimate game of the league season at Mongkok Stadium. The game attracted a full house of 8,426, the first full house for 11 years at Mongkok Stadium.
- On 19 April 2007, SCAA signed Chan Wai Ho from the Rangers for a transfer fee of HK$400,000. This broke the record of highest local transfer fee and highest transfer fee in Hong Kong First Division League. The highest local transfer fee record had been held by Tam Ah Fook when he moved to Ernest Borel from Happy Valley for HK$140,000 in 1992. The highest overall transfer fee was held by Cheng Siu Chung Ricky when he moved from Alajuela in Costa Rica to South China in the 1994–95 season for a fee of US$30,000 (about HK$234,000).
- On 27 April 2007, SCAA played their last match of the 2006-07 League season against Lanwa Redbull at Lanwa's home ground in Dongguan, China. SCAA's Detinho scored a hat-trick in the match to seal SCAA's 3–1 win. By winning this match, they secured the League title, and their 28th title overall. As the league champions, SCAA qualified for the continental competition AFC Cup 2008.
- On 19 May 2007, SCAA played the final of the Hong Kong FA Cup 2006-07 against Happy Valley at the Hong Kong Stadium. With a penalty scored by Detinho and goals scored by Chan Chi Hong and Cheng Siu Wai. SCAA secured their 9th overall Hong Kong FA Cup title and their local treble this season (Hong Kong First Division League champions, Hong Kong Senior Shield champions and the Hong Kong FA Cup).

== Players ==
=== South China Star of the Month ===
Winners are given a prize of HK$8,000

- August 2006: Hugo Coelho (曉高·古希路)
- September 2006: Detinho (迪天奴)
- October 2006: Zhang Chunhui (張春暉)
- November 2006: Tales Schütz (T·史高斯)
- December 2006: Man Pei Tak (文彼得)
- January 2007: Wong Chun Yue (黃鎮宇)
- February 2007: Li Haiqiang (李海強)
- March 2007: Zhang Chunhui (張春暉)
- April 2007: Detinho (迪天奴)
- May 2007: Detinho (迪天奴)

=== Playeys in/out ===
==== In ====
- (China) Li Haiqiang (李海強) from Chengdu Blades (Chinese Football Association Jia League)
- (China) Tang Jinkai (唐金凱) from Chengdu Blades (Chinese Football Association Jia League) (loan)
- (Brazil) Detinho (迪天奴) from Imortal DC (Portuguese Second Division Serie D)
- (China) (Hong Kong) Zhang Chunhui (張春暉) from Rangers
- (Hong Kong) Man Pei Tak (文彼得) from Rangers
- (Portugal) Marco Almeida (馬高·艾美達) from SL Nelas (Portuguese Second Division Serie C)
- (Portugal) Carlos Oliveira (卡路士·奧利韋拉)
- (Portugal) Hugo Coelho (曉高·古希路) from U. Micaelense (Portuguese Second Division Serie D)
- (Brazil) Tales Schütz (T·史高斯) from Grêmio Inhumense (Brazilian Campeonato Goiano) (loan)
- (Portugal) André Costa (A·哥斯達) from Lousada (Portuguese Second Division Serie A)
- (Brazil) Platini (柏天尼) from Grêmio Inhumense (Brazilian Campeonato Goiano) (loan)
- (China) Bai He (白鶴) from Chengdu Blades (Chinese Football Association Jia League)
- (China) Zhang Jianzhong (張健忠) from Guangzhou Pharmaceutical (Chinese Football Association Jia League)
- (Serbia) Mihailo Jovanović (祖雲奴域) from Rangers
- (Togo) (Brazil) Cris (基斯) from Metropolitano (Brazilian Campeonato Catarinense) (loan)
- Petri Jalava (柏烈) from RoPS (Ykkönen of Finland)
- (Brazil) Edemar Picoli (比高) from CSA (Brazilian Série C)
- (China) Liang Zicheng (梁子成) from Guangzhou Pharmaceutical (Chinese Football Association Jia League)
- (Brazil) Waldir (華迪)
- (Ghana) Yaw Anane (友友) from Citizen (loan)
- (Brazil) Cleiton (基頓) from Santa Cruz (Brazilian Pernambuco Football Championship Série A1) (short term loan until 20 May 2007)
- (Hong Kong) Chan Wai Ho (陳偉豪) from Rangers

==== Out ====
- (Hong Kong) (Macau) Leung Tsz Chun (梁子駿) to Rangers
- (China) Wei Zhao (魏釗) to Rangers
- Chan Qian (陳謙) to Guangzhou Pharmaceutical (China)
- (China) Wan Liyu (萬立昱) to Dalian Shide (Chinese Super League)
- (China) Zhang Enhua (張恩華) (retired)
- (Hong Kong) Luk Koon Pong (陸冠邦) to Kitchee
- (Portugal) Marco Almeida (馬高·艾美達) (contract terminated)
- (Portugal) André Costa (A·哥斯達) (contract terminated)
- (Portugal) Carlos Oliveira (卡路士·奧利韋拉) (contract terminated)
- (Portugal) Hugo Coelho (曉高·古希路) (contract terminated)
- (Brazil) Platini (柏天尼) (contract terminated)
- (China) Tang Jinkai (唐金凱) to Chengdu Blades (loan contract terminated)
- (Finland) Petri Jalava (柏烈) (unsuccessful trial)
- (Brazil) Waldir (華迪) (unsuccessful trial)

== Club ==
=== Coaching staff ===
Position	Staff
Head coach	(Portugal) Jorge Amaral
Head coach	(Brazil) Casemiro Mior

=== Kit ===
Supplier: Adidas
Sponsor(s): JNC-Digital (main sponsor)
