= 2001–02 C.D. Santa Clara season =

Santa Clara
2001–02 season
- Head coach: Carlos Manuel; Manuel Fernandes
- Primeira Liga: 14th
- Taça de Portugal: Fifth round
- Top goalscorer: League: Toñito (7); All: Toñito (7)

The 2001–02 season was the 81st season in the existence of C.D. Santa Clara and the club's first consecutive season in the top-flight of Portuguese football. In addition to the domestic league, Santa Clara participated in this season's edition of the Taça de Portugal.

== Season summary ==
Santa Clara comfortably escaped relegation and finished in 14th, which was until 2019 their best-ever league finish. They also qualified for the UEFA Intertoto Cup.

== First-team squad ==
Squad at end of season

Note: Flags indicate national team as defined under FIFA eligibility rules; some limited exceptions apply. Players may hold more than one non-FIFA nationality.

| No. | Pos. | Nation | Player |
|---|---|---|---|
| 1 | GK | ANG | Fernando Pereira |
| 2 | DF | POR | Portela |
| 3 | DF | BRA | Sandro |
| 4 | DF | BRA | Telmo |
| 5 | DF | ANG | Kali |
| 6 | DF | POR | Rui Gregório |
| 7 | MF | ESP | Ivan Cortes Garcia (Míner) |
| 8 | MF | POR | Paiva |
| 9 | MF | BRA | George |
| 10 | MF | ANG | Paulo Figueiredo |
| 11 | FW | CPV | Toni |
| 12 | GK | GNB | Hidraldo José Carvalho Nogueira (Du) |
| 13 | DF | POR | José Leal (Note: José Leal was born in Sá da Bandeira (now Lubango), Angola.) |
| 14 | FW | ESP | José Luis Morales |

| No. | Pos. | Nation | Player |
|---|---|---|---|
| 16 | MF | POR | António Barrigana |
| 18 | MF | POR | Sérgio Nunes |
| 19 | MF | CIV | Idrissa Keita (on loan from Real Oviedo) |
| 20 | MF | ANG | Cláudio Abreu |
| 22 | DF | BRA | Luís Soares |
| 23 | MF | ARG | Mauricio Hanuch (on loan from Sporting CP) |
| 24 | GK | POR | Jorge Silva |
| 25 | MF | ESP | Toñito |
| 26 | MF | POR | Vítor Vieira |
| 27 | MF | BRA | Geraldo |
| 28 | MF | BRA | Glaedson |
| 29 | FW | BRA | Brandão |
| 30 | FW | BRA | Flávio Galvão |
| — | MF | HUN | Gábor Vayer |

=== Left club during season ===
Note: Flags indicate national team as defined under FIFA eligibility rules; some limited exceptions apply. Players may hold more than one non-FIFA nationality.

| No. | Pos. | Nation | Player |
|---|---|---|---|
| 15 | MF | POR | Nuno Sociedade (de-registered) |
| 17 | DF | POR | Bruno Melo |

| No. | Pos. | Nation | Player |
|---|---|---|---|
| 21 | MF | POR | Nelson Faria |

== Competitions ==
=== Overview ===
| Competition | First match | Last match | Starting round | Final position | Record | | | | | | | |
| Competition | First match | Last match | Starting round | Final position | Pld | W | D | L | GF | GA | GD | Win % |
|---|---|---|---|---|---|---|---|---|---|---|---|---|
| Primeira Liga | 12 August 2001 | 5 May 2002 | Matchday 1 | 14th | 34 | 9 | 10 | 15 | 32 | 46 | −14 | 26.47 |
| Taça de Portugal | 18 November 2001 | 12 December 2001 | Fourth round | Fifth round | 2 | 1 | 0 | 1 | 4 | 4 | +0 | 50.00 |
| Total | | | | | 36 | 10 | 10 | 16 | 36 | 50 | −14 | 27.78 |

Source: Competitions

=== Primeira Liga ===
==== League table ====
| Pos | Team | Pld | W | D | L | GF | GA | GD | Pts | Qualification or relegation |
|---|---|---|---|---|---|---|---|---|---|---|
| 12 | Gil Vicente | 34 | 10 | 8 | 16 | 42 | 56 | −14 | 38 | |
| 13 | Vitória de Setúbal | 34 | 9 | 11 | 14 | 40 | 46 | −6 | 38 | |
| 14 | Santa Clara | 34 | 9 | 10 | 15 | 32 | 46 | −14 | 37 | Qualification to Intertoto Cup first round |
| 15 | Varzim | 34 | 8 | 8 | 18 | 27 | 55 | −28 | 32 | |
| 16 | Salgueiros (R) | 34 | 8 | 6 | 20 | 29 | 71 | −42 | 30 | Relegation to Segunda Liga |

Source: Primeira Divisão
Rules for classification: 1) points; 2) head-to-head points; 3) head-to-head goal difference; 4) goal difference; 5) number of goals scored
(R) Relegated

==== Results summary ====
| Overall | | | | | | | | Home | | | | | | Away | | | | | |
| Pld | W | D | L | GF | GA | GD | Pts | W | D | L | GF | GA | GD | W | D | L | GF | GA | GD |
|---|---|---|---|---|---|---|---|---|---|---|---|---|---|---|---|---|---|---|---|
| 34 | 9 | 10 | 15 | 32 | 46 | −14 | 37 | 7 | 7 | 3 | 16 | 13 | +3 | 2 | 3 | 12 | 16 | 33 | −17 |

==== Results by round ====
| Round | 1 | 2 | 3 | 4 | 5 | 6 | 7 | 8 | 9 | 10 | 11 | 12 | 13 | 14 | 15 | 16 | 17 | 18 | 19 | 20 | 21 | 22 | 23 | 24 | 25 | 26 | 27 | 28 | 29 | 30 | 31 | 32 | 33 | 34 |
|---|---|---|---|---|---|---|---|---|---|---|---|---|---|---|---|---|---|---|---|---|---|---|---|---|---|---|---|---|---|---|---|---|---|---|
| Ground | H | A | H | A | H | A | A | H | A | H | A | H | A | H | A | H | A | A | H | A | H | A | H | H | A | H | A | H | A | H | A | H | A | H |
| Result | W | D | D | L | W | L | L | D | D | L | L | W | L | W | W | W | D | L | D | W | W | L | W | D | L | L | L | D | L | D | L | D | L | L |
| Position | 6 | 3 | 7 | 11 | 7 | 11 | 15 | 15 | 15 | 15 | 16 | 15 | 16 | 13 | 11 | 9 | 10 | 11 | 11 | 10 | 8 | 9 | 9 | 9 | 9 | 10 | 10 | 11 | 11 | 11 | 13 | 12 | 14 | 14 |

Source: FootballPortugal
A = Away; H = Home; W = Win; D = Draw; L = Loss
