= Jalava =

Jalava is a Finnish surname. Notable people with the surname include:

- Oskari Jalava (1876–1950), Finnish plater and politician
- Hugo Jalava (1874–1950), Finnish train driver
- Pertti Jalava (born 1960), Finnish composer
- Petri Jalava (born 1976), Finnish footballer
- Reijo Jalava
- Randy T. Jalava (Born 1965), Canadian independent music artist
