= Cavaleiro =

Cavaleiro, the Portuguese word for "knight" and a common surname, can refer to:

- Deonise Cavaleiro (1983), Brazilian handball player
- Fernando Cavaleiro (1917–2012), Portuguese equestrian
- Ivan Cavaleiro (1993), Portuguese footballer
- Nuno Cavaleiro (1976), Portuguese footballer
