= Chung Ho Yin =

Hong Kong footballer

Chung Ho Yin 鍾皓賢
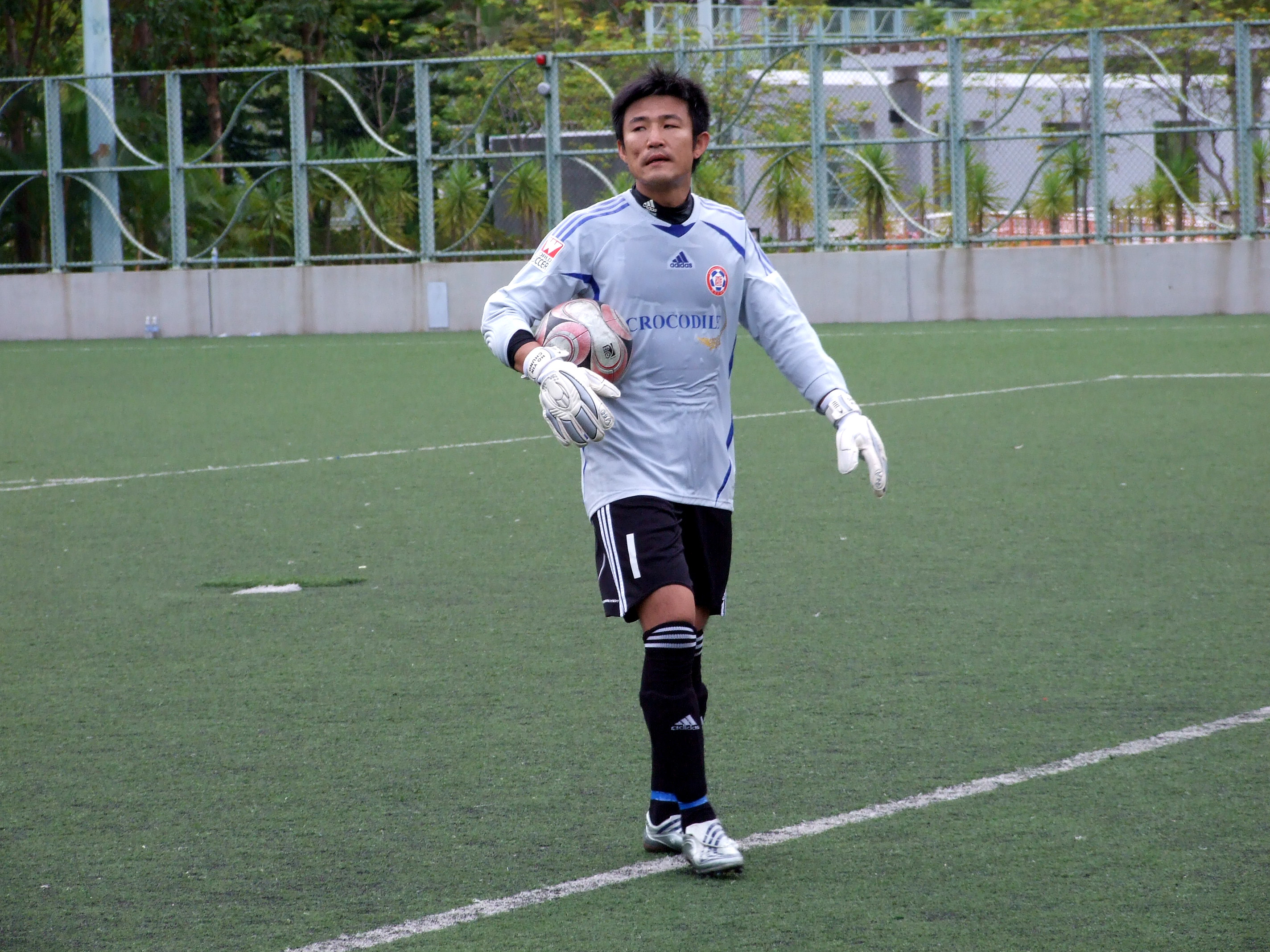

Personal information
- Date of birth: 15 April 1971 (age 55)
- Place of birth: Hong Kong
- Height: 1.76 m (5 ft 9 1/2 in)

Senior career*
Years	Team	Apps	(Gls)
1990–1992	Kitchee	0	(0)
1992–1994	Eastern	0	(0)
1994–1995	Kui Tan	0	(0)
1995–1996	Hong Kong Rangers	0	(0)
1996–2000	Instant-Dict	0	(0)
2000–2001	Hong Kong Rangers	0	(0)
2001–2008	South China	11	(0)
2007	→ Eastern (loan)	5	(0)
2008–2013	Eastern	70	(0)

International career^{‡}
1989–1991	Hong Kong U-23		
1993–2003	Hong Kong	18	(0)

Managerial career
- 2013–2018: Eastern (goalkeeping coach)
- * Club domestic league appearances and goals ‡ National team caps and goals as of 20 October 2026

Chung Ho Yin (Chinese: 鍾皓賢; Cantonese Yale: Jūng Houh Yìn; born 15 April 1971, in Hong Kong) is a former Hong Kong professional footballer.

== Club career ==
He made his debut in first level game in Lai Sun's FA Cup match against Sing Tao on 6 April 1990.

He was released by South China of Hong Kong First Division League after 2006–07 season. However, he resigned a contract with The Caroliners after the start of 2007–08 season. He then was loaned to Eastern for the first half of the season and played 5 matches for the team. In 2008–09 season, he signed again with Eastern as a contract player.

== International career ==
He has capped for Hong Kong at various youth levels, the Olympic team and was a season international. He also played in the 1992 FIFA Futsal World Championship, helping Hong Kong to finish 10th while beating Nigeria 4–1 in the process.

== Career statistics ==
As of 14 May 2008

Club	Season	League		Senior Shield		League Cup		FA Cup		AFC Cup		Total	
Club	Season	Apps	Goals	Apps	Goals	Apps	Goals	Apps	Goals	Apps	Goals	Apps	Goals
South China	2005–06	5 (1)	0	0 (0)	0	0 (0)	0	1 (0)	0	NA	NA	6 (1)	0
South China	2006–07	4 (0)	0	0 (0)	0	0 (0)	0	0 (0)	0	NA	NA	4 (0)	0
South China	2007–08	1 (0)	0	0 (0)	0	1 (0)	0	0 (0)	0	1 (1)	0	3 (1)	0
South China	All	? (?)	?	? (?)	?	? (?)	?	? (?)	?	0	0	? (?)	?
Eastern (loan)	2007–08	5 (0)	0	0 (0)	0	0 (0)	0	0 (0)	0	NA	NA	5 (0)	0
Eastern (loan)	All	5 (0)	0	0 (0)	0	0 (0)	0	0 (0)	0	NA	NA	5 (0)	0

Preceded by Yau Kin Wai; Tam Siu Wai	Hong Kong First Division League Best Youth Player Award (with Lo Kai Wah); 1992–93	Succeeded by Yau Kin Wai; Yeung Hei Chi
