= Nuno Sociedade =

Portuguese footballer

Personal information
- Full name: Nuno Alexandre Teixeira Sociedade
- Date of birth: 6 June 1979 (age 47)
- Place of birth: Ponta Delgada, Portugal
- Height: 1.78 m (5 ft 10 in)
- Position: Midfielder

Team information
- Current team: Vasco Gama Açores

Youth career
- 1991–1996: Vasco Gama Açores
- 1996–1997: Bota Fogo
- 1997–1998: Micaelense

Senior career*
Years	Team	Apps	(Gls)
1998–2000	Micaelense		
2000–2010	Santa Clara	149	(3)
2010–2020	Santiago	71	(1)
2020–	Vasco Gama Açores	15	(0)
- * Club domestic league appearances and goals as of 11:17, 27 October 2023 (UTC)

Nuno Alexandre Teixeira Sociedade (born 6 January 1979) is a Portuguese footballer who plays mainly as a left midfielder for Vasco Gama V.F. do Campo.

== Club career ==
Sociedade was born in Ponta Delgada. Being able to operate as either a midfielder or a defender on the left flank, he spent most of his professional career with local C.D. Santa Clara, playing nearly 200 competitive matches with the Azores club and also being eventually awarded captaincy. His only Primeira Liga experience arrived in the 2002–03 season, but he failed to appear in the league – only six presences as an unused substitute – as the side were also relegated after ranking in 16th position.

In the summer of 2010, after just four Segunda Liga games during the campaign, the 31-year-old Sociedade left Santa Clara and signed for Santiago Futebol Clube, an amateur team in the island of São Miguel, in his birth region.
