= Ícaro Oliveira =

Brazilian footballer

Personal information
- Full name: Ícaro Passos de Oliveira
- Date of birth: June 11, 1984 (age 42)
- Place of birth: Tapes, Rio Grande do Sul, Brazil
- Height: 1.90 m (6 ft 3 in)
- Position: Striker

Team information
- Current team: Sapucaiense

Senior career*
Years	Team	Apps	(Gls)
- Joinville
2005	São José (POA)		
2006	Clube 15 de Novembro		
2006	Mogi Mirim		
2007	Happy Valley	5	(0)
2008	Internacional de Santa Maria		
2008	Cruzeiro-RS		
2009	Sapucaiense		
- * Club domestic league appearances and goals as of February 3, 2007 ‡ National team caps and goals as of February 3, 2007

Ícaro Passos de Oliveira (born June 11, 1984 in Tapes, Rio Grande do Sul, Brazil), is a Brazilian footballer. He played as a striker for Sapucaiense.

He is known as Ícaro in Brazil, but as Oliveira in Hong Kong.

== Biography ==
Early career

Ícaro Oliveira played for Sport Club Internacional, Joinville, São José (POA), Clube 15 de Novembro and Mogi Mirim

After that, he played for Happy Valley A.A.

Ícaro Oliveira returned to Internacional de Santa Maria after being released by Happy Valley. He signed a contract until the end of state league in February 2008.

== Career statistics ==
Club career

As of February 3, 2007

Club	Season	No.	League		League Cup		Senior Shield		FA Cup		AFC Cup		Total	
Club	Season	No.	Apps	Goals	Apps	Goals	Apps	Goals	Apps	Goals	Apps	Goals	Apps	Goals
Happy Valley	2006-07	11	3	1	1	1	1	2	1	1	2	2	8	7
Happy Valley	Total													
Career Total														
