= Hong Kong national football team results =

The following are the Hong Kong national football team results.

== Best / Worst Results ==
=== Best ===
1. 15–0 Guam 2005
2. 15–1 Guam 2008
3. 12–0 Guam 2009
4. 11–0 Guam 2003
5. 10–0 Mongolia 2003
5. 10–0 Brunei 2023
7. 9–1 Bangladesh 1975
7. 9–1 Macau 2008
9. 8–0 Brunei 1986
9. 8–0 Philippines 1996
9. 8–0 Fiji 2025

=== Worst ===
1. 0–7 China 1980
1. 0–7 China 2004
1. 0–7 Paraguay 2010
1. 0–7 Argentina 2014
5. 1–7 Brazil 2005
6. 0–6 Oman 1998
6. 0–6 Japan 2009
6. 0–6 Japan 2022
9. 1–6 Japan 2025
10. 0–5 South Vietnam 1967
10. 0–5 Burma 1970
10. 0–5 Burma 1975
10. 0–5 Thailand 1998
10. 0–5 South Korea 2010
10. 0–5 Saudi Arabia 2011
10. 0–5 Japan 2019

== Competitive Record Review ==
=== FIFA World Cup record ===
| FIFA World Cup record | | | | | | | | | FIFA World Cup qualification record | | | | | |
| Year | Result | Position | Pld | W | D* | L | GF | GA | Pld | W | D | L | GF | GA |
|---|---|---|---|---|---|---|---|---|---|---|---|---|---|---|
| (Uruguay) 1930 to (Switzerland) 1954 | Not a FIFA member | | | | | | | | Not a FIFA member | | | | | |
| (Sweden) 1958 to (Mexico) 1970 | Did not enter | | | | | | | | Did not enter | | | | | |
| (West Germany) 1974 | Did not qualify | | | | | | | | 4 | 3 | 0 | 1 | 4 | 3 |
| (Argentina) 1978 | Did not qualify | | | | | | | | 13 | 3 | 2 | 8 | 15 | 31 |
| (Spain) 1982 | Did not qualify | | | | | | | | 4 | 0 | 3 | 1 | 3 | 4 |
| (Mexico) 1986 | Did not qualify | | | | | | | | 8 | 5 | 1 | 2 | 20 | 7 |
| (Italy) 1990 | Did not qualify | | | | | | | | 6 | 0 | 3 | 3 | 5 | 10 |
| (United States) 1994 | Did not qualify | | | | | | | | 8 | 2 | 1 | 5 | 9 | 19 |
| (France) 1998 | Did not qualify | | | | | | | | 4 | 1 | 0 | 3 | 3 | 10 |
| (South Korea) (Japan) 2002 | Did not qualify | | | | | | | | 6 | 1 | 1 | 4 | 3 | 10 |
| (Germany) 2006 | Did not qualify | | | | | | | | 6 | 2 | 0 | 4 | 5 | 15 |
| (South Africa) 2010 | Did not qualify | | | | | | | | 4 | 2 | 1 | 1 | 11 | 6 |
| (Brazil) 2014 | Did not qualify | | | | | | | | 2 | 0 | 0 | 2 | 0 | 8 |
| (Russia) 2018 | Did not qualify | | | | | | | | 8 | 4 | 2 | 2 | 13 | 5 |
| (Qatar) 2022 | Did not qualify | | | | | | | | 8 | 1 | 2 | 5 | 4 | 13 |
| (Canada) (Mexico) (United States) 2026 | Did not qualify | | | | | | | | 8 | 1 | 2 | 5 | 8 | 17 |
| (Morocco) (Portugal) (Spain) 2030 | To be determined | | | | | | | | To be determined | | | | | |
| (Saudi Arabia) 2034 | To be determined | | | | | | | | To be determined | | | | | |
| Total | — | 0/18 | – | – | – | – | – | – | 89 | 25 | 18 | 46 | 103 | 158 |

=== AFC Asian Cup record ===
| AFC Asian Cup record | | | | | | | | | Qualification record | | | | | |
| Year | Result | Position | Pld | W | D* | L | GF | GA | Pld | W | D | L | GF | GA |
|---|---|---|---|---|---|---|---|---|---|---|---|---|---|---|
| (Hong Kong) 1956 | Third place | 3rd | 3 | 0 | 2 | 1 | 6 | 7 | Qualified as hosts | | | | | |
| (South Korea) 1960 | Did not qualify | | | | | | | | 2 | 1 | 0 | 1 | 11 | 7 |
| (Israel) 1964 | Fourth place | 4th | 3 | 0 | 0 | 3 | 1 | 5 | 3 | 2 | 1 | 0 | 11 | 7 |
| (Iran) 1968 | Fifth place | 5th | 4 | 0 | 1 | 3 | 2 | 11 | 4 | 4 | 0 | 0 | 9 | 1 |
| (Thailand) 1972 | Did not qualify | | | | | | | | 3 | 0 | 0 | 3 | 3 | 6 |
| (Iran) 1976 | Did not qualify | | | | | | | | 5 | 1 | 2 | 2 | 6 | 5 |
| (Kuwait) 1980 | Did not qualify | | | | | | | | 6 | 3 | 1 | 2 | 10 | 6 |
| (Singapore) 1984 | Did not qualify | | | | | | | | 4 | 0 | 2 | 2 | 1 | 4 |
| (Qatar) 1988 | Did not qualify | | | | | | | | 4 | 0 | 1 | 3 | 0 | 5 |
| (Japan) 1992 | Did not qualify | | | | | | | | 3 | 0 | 3 | 0 | 2 | 2 |
| (United Arab Emirates) 1996 | Did not qualify | | | | | | | | 3 | 2 | 0 | 1 | 12 | 3 |
| (Lebanon) 2000 | Did not qualify | | | | | | | | 4 | 2 | 1 | 1 | 7 | 5 |
| (China) 2004 | Did not qualify | | | | | | | | 8 | 2 | 2 | 4 | 10 | 14 |
| (Indonesia) (Malaysia) (Thailand) (Vietnam) 2007 | Did not qualify | | | | | | | | 6 | 2 | 2 | 2 | 5 | 7 |
| (Qatar) 2011 | Did not qualify | | | | | | | | 6 | 0 | 1 | 5 | 1 | 18 |
| (Australia) 2015 | Did not qualify | | | | | | | | 6 | 1 | 1 | 4 | 2 | 13 |
| (United Arab Emirates) 2019 | Did not qualify | | | | | | | | 14 | 5 | 4 | 5 | 17 | 12 |
| (Qatar) 2023 | Group stage | 23rd | 3 | 0 | 0 | 3 | 1 | 7 | 11 | 3 | 2 | 6 | 9 | 18 |
| (Saudi Arabia) 2027 | Did not qualify | | | | | | | | 14 | 3 | 4 | 7 | 16 | 25 |
| Total | Third place | 4/19 | 13 | 0 | 3 | 10 | 10 | 30 | 106 | 31 | 27 | 48 | 132 | 158 |

=== Asian Games record ===
Since 2002, see Hong Kong national under-23 football team

Asian Games Record
| Hosts / Year | Result | Position | GP | W | D* | L | GS | GA |
|---|---|---|---|---|---|---|---|---|
| (India) 1951 | Did not enter | | | | | | | |
| (Philippines) 1954 | First round | 5 | 2 | 1 | 1 | 0 | 7 | 5 |
| (Japan) 1958 | Quarter-finals | 7 | 3 | 1 | 2 | 0 | 8 | 6 |
| 1962 to 1986 | Did not enter | | | | | | | |
| (China) 1990 | First round | 9 | 3 | 1 | 0 | 2 | 3 | 4 |
| (Japan) 1994 | First round | 12 | 4 | 1 | 0 | 3 | 6 | 8 |
| (Thailand) 1998 | First round | 22 | 2 | 0 | 0 | 2 | 0 | 11 |
| Total | 5/13 | Quarter-finals | 14 | 4 | 3 | 7 | 24 | 34 |

=== East Asian Football Championship record ===
| EAFF E-1 Football Championship record | | | | | | | | | EAFF E-1 Football Championship qualification record | | | | | |
| Year | Result | Position | Pld | W | D* | L | GF | GA | Pld | W | D | L | GF | GA |
|---|---|---|---|---|---|---|---|---|---|---|---|---|---|---|
| (Japan) 2003 | Fourth place | 4 | 3 | 0 | 0 | 3 | 2 | 7 | 4 | 4 | 0 | 0 | 26 | 0 |
| (South Korea) 2005 | Did not qualify | | | | | | | | 4 | 3 | 0 | 1 | 26 | 2 |
| (China) 2008 | Did not qualify | | | | | | | | 3 | 1 | 1 | 1 | 16 | 3 |
| (Japan) 2010 | Fourth place | 4 | 3 | 0 | 0 | 3 | 0 | 10 | 3 | 2 | 1 | 0 | 16 | 0 |
| (South Korea) 2013 | Did not qualify | | | | | | | | 4 | 2 | 0 | 2 | 4 | 6 |
| (China) 2015 | Did not qualify | | | | | | | | 3 | 1 | 1 | 1 | 2 | 2 |
| (Japan) 2017 | Did not qualify | | | | | | | | 3 | 2 | 0 | 1 | 7 | 5 |
| (South Korea) 2019 | Fourth place | 4 | 3 | 0 | 0 | 3 | 0 | 9 | 3 | 2 | 1 | 0 | 7 | 2 |
| (Japan) 2022 | Fourth place | 4 | 3 | 0 | 0 | 3 | 0 | 10 | Qualified via FIFA Ranking | | | | | |
| (South Korea) 2025 | Fourth place | 4 | 3 | 0 | 0 | 3 | 1 | 9 | 3 | 3 | 0 | 0 | 10 | 1 |
| Total | 5/10 | Fourth place | 15 | 0 | 0 | 15 | 3 | 45 | 30 | 20 | 4 | 6 | 114 | 21 |

=== FIFA ASEAN Challenge Cup record ===
FIFA ASEAN Challenge Cup record
| Year | Result | Pld | W | D | L | GF | GA |
|---|---|---|---|---|---|---|---|
| (Hong Kong) 2026 | Champions | 3 | 3 | 0 | 0 | 8 | 0 |
