= Telmo (Brazilian footballer) =

Brazilian footballer

Personal information
- Full name: Telmo Além da Silva
- Date of birth: 13 January 1975 (age 51)
- Place of birth: Volta Redonda, Brazil
- Height: 1.74 m (5 ft 9 in)
- Position: Left-back

Senior career*
| Years | Team | Apps | (Gls) |
| 1994 | Volta Redonda | | |
| 1995 | Barra Mansa | | |
| 1996–1998 | Madureira | | |
| 1997 | → Central (loan) | | |
| 1997 | → Sport (loan) | | |
| 1998 | Campomaiorense | 8 | (0) |
| 1998–2002 | Santa Clara | 101 | (2) |
| 2001 | → Sport (loan) | | |
| 2002–2004 | Braga | 22 | (0) |
| 2004–2015 | Varzim | 236 | (5) |
| Total | | 367 | (7) |
- * Club domestic league appearances and goals

Telmo Além da Silva (born 13 January 1975), known simply as Telmo, is a Brazilian retired professional footballer who played as a left-back.

== Club career ==
Born in Volta Redonda, Rio de Janeiro, Telmo arrived in Portugal in January 1998, joining S.C. Campomaiorense of the Primeira Liga. He remained in the country the following 17 years, save for a loan return in Brazil with Sport Club do Recife.

Telmo also represented C.D. Santa Clara, S.C. Braga and Varzim SC. With the latter team, he appeared in seven consecutive Segunda Liga seasons, being relegated in 2010–11 (13 matches, one goal from the player). He continued to play with the same club until June 2015, when he announced his retirement aged already 40.

== Honours ==
Santa Clara

- Segunda Liga: 2000–01
