= Du Ping =

Chinese footballer (born 1978)

Du Ping 杜苹
Personal information
- Full name: Du Ping
- Date of birth: February 28, 1978 (age 48)
- Place of birth: Shenyang, China
- Height: 1.82 m (6 ft 0 in)
- Position: Midfielder

Youth career
- 1994–1998: Shenyang Ginde

Senior career*
Years	Team	Apps	(Gls)
1998–2004	Shenyang Ginde	95	(18)
2004–2007	Shaanxi Baorong Chanba	48	(2)
2007–2008	South China (loan)	2	(0)
2008–2009	Shenyang Dongjin	3	(0)
2010	Panjin Mengzun	?	(?)

International career
2003–2004	China PR	4	(0)
Medal record
Representing China
Men's football
East Asian Football Championship
Bronze medal – third place	2003 Japan	Team
- * Club domestic league appearances and goals as of 1 Jan 2012

Du Ping (Chinese: 杜苹, born 28 February 1978) is a Chinese former international footballer who predominantly played for Shenyang Jinde and Shaanxi Baorong Chanba as a midfielder.

== Club career ==
Du started his football career in the 1998 Chinese league season with top tier football club Shenyang Ginde where he would gradually establish himself as talented attacking midfielder. His performances for his club would soon see him called up to the Chinese international team and on February 16, 2003 he would make his debut against Estonia in a friendly, which saw China win 1-0. By the 2004 Chinese league season, league runners-up Shanghai COSCO Sanlin purchased him for Four million Yuan, however in his debut season a poor run of form and injuries saw him only limited to six league games without scoring. While he would overcome his injuries the following season his performances were not as inspiring as the club were hoping for and the team finished the league in eighth.

In 2007, he joined Hong Kong First Division League club South China on loan and made his debut for the team in a First Division League match against Workable as a substitution player on 26 September 2007 where SCAA won by 6-1. On 16 October 2007, it was released on SCAA Official Blog that the contract with Du had been terminated due to his discipline problem. The issue was mainly due to a quarrel between Du and teammate Detinho before a match against Citizen on 13 October 2007. Detinho also received a verbal warning after the incident. After his brief period within Hong Kong, Du would return to China and transferred to second tier club Shenyang Dongjin before joining third tier football team Panjin Mengzun in 2010.

== Career statistics ==
Club	Season	League		Cup		Continental		Total	
Club	Season	Apps	Goals	Apps	Goals	Apps	Goals	Apps	Goals
Shenyang Ginde	1998	0	0	0	0	-	-	0	0
Shenyang Ginde	1999	9	0	0	0	-	-	9	0
Shenyang Ginde	2000	19	1	0	0	-	-	19	1
Shenyang Ginde	2001	18	8	0	0	-	-	18	8
Shenyang Ginde	2002	27	7	0	0	-	-	27	7
Shenyang Ginde	2003	22	2	0	0	-	-	22	2
Shanghai COSCO Sanlin	2004	6	0	0	0	-	-	6	0
Shanghai Yungtay	2005	23	2	0	0	-	-	23	2
Xi'an Chanba International	2006	18	0	0	0	-	-	18	0
Shaanxi Baorong Chanba	2007	1	0	-	-	-	-	1	0
South China	2007-08	2	0	-	-	-	-	2	0
Shenyang Dongjin	2008	0	0	-	-	-	-	0	0
Shenyang Dongjin	2009	3	0	-	-	-	-	3	0
Panjin Mengzun	2010	?	?	-	-	-	-	?	?
Career total		148	20	0	0	-	-	148	20

Last updated: 1 Jan 2012
