= 2006–07 Hong Kong Second Division League =

2006–07 Hong Kong Second Division League was the 93rd season of Hong Kong Second Division League.

The top 2 teams in 2005–06 season, HKFC and Tai Po have promoted to First Division. However, the bottom 2 teams in First Division are retained by HKFA in the top division. Therefore, the number of teams competing in the Second Division in 2006–07 is reduced from 13 to 11 teams. The 2 teams promoted from Third Division were Shek Kip Mei and Yau Tsim Mong.

== League table ==
Pos	Team	Pld	W	D	L	GF	GA	GD	Pts	Promotion or relegation
1	Tung Po (C)	20	15	3	2	47	8	+39	48	Refused promotion to First Division
2	Shek Kip Mei (P)	20	14	4	2	68	18	+50	46	Promotion to First Division
3	Fukien	20	9	5	6	39	28	+11	32	
4	New Fair Kui Tan	20	9	4	7	18	28	−10	31	
5	Double Flower	20	8	4	8	27	35	−8	28	
6	Kwai Tsing	20	7	5	8	23	33	−10	26	
7	Lucky Mile	20	8	2	10	28	31	−3	26	
8	Mutual	20	5	8	7	22	25	−3	23	
9	Kwok Keung	20	7	1	12	17	31	−14	22	
10	Eastern (P)	20	5	4	11	28	45	−17	19	Relegation to Third 'A' Division by rule but subsequently invited to promote to First Division League after obtaining sufficient sponsorship
11	Yau Tsim Mong (R)	20	1	4	15	16	51	−35	7	Relegation to Third 'District' Division

Source: The Hong Kong Football Association
(C) Champions; (P) Promoted; (R) Relegated

== Results ==
Home \ Away	DOU	EAS	FUK	KWA	KWO	LUC	MUT	NEW	SKM	TUN	YTM
Double Flower		2–0	2–2	1–0	0–1	0–1	1–1	2–0	0–3	0–5	4–0
Eastern	1–3		4–4	1–0	2–0	1–2	1–1	0–1	2–7	0–3	2–2
Fukien	2–0	6–1		2–0	0–3	4–0	1–1	2–2	2–1	0–1	3–2
Kwai Tsing	1–1	3–2	0–3		1–0	4–2	0–0	2–0	0–4	0–3	1–1
Kwok Keung	1–3	0–3	0–3	2–1		1–0	0–1	0–4	0–3	0–2	1–0
Lucky Mile	3–1	1–3	0–2	1–2	3–0		2–1	0–1	1–1	0–1	6–2
Mutual	0–2	0–2	3–1	2–2	1–1	0–0		3–1	1–2	0–2	4–0
New Fair Kui Tan	1–0	1–0	0–0	1–2	2–1	1–0	1–1		0–9	0–4	0–0
Shek Kip Mei	12–2	2–0	3–0	2–2	0–3	4–1	4–0	2–0		2–2	4–1
Tung Po	0–0	5–1	3–1	4–0	1–0	1–2	2–0	0–1	1–1		6–0
Yau Tsim Mong	1–3	2–2	2–1	1–2	1–3	1–3	0–2	0–1	0–2	0–1	

Legend: Blue = home team win; Yellow = draw; Red = away team win.

== Top goalscorers ==
Pos	Name	Club	Number of goals
1	Ching Ho Yin	Shek Kip Mei	20
2	Chan Kung Pok	Fukien	12
2	James John Daws	Tung Po	12
4	Lo Chi Fung	Tung Po	11
5	Wong Lung Fai	Fukien	9
5	Michael John Risely	Lucky Mile	9

== Featured matches ==
- Highest Scoring Match:

Rank	Date	Teams and Results	Total Goals
1	Round 22: 15 April 2007	Shek Kip Mei 12–2 Double Flower	14
2	Round 9: 4 November 2006	Eastern 2–7 Shek Kip Mei	9
2	Round 12: 28 January 2007	New Fair Kui Tan 0–9 Shek Kip Mei	9
4	Round 7: 22 October 2006	Eastern 4–4 Fukien AA	8
4	Round 12: 28 January 2007	Lucky Mile 6–2 Yau Tsim Mong	8

- Biggest Goal Difference Match:

Rank	Date	Teams and Results	Goal Difference
1	Round 22: 15 April 2007	Shek Kip Mei 12–2 Double Flower	10
2	Round 12: 28 January 2007	New Fair Kui Tan 0–9 Shek Kip Mei	9
3	Round 18: 18 March 2007	Tung Po 6–0 Yau Tsim Mong	6
4	Round 9: 4 November 2006	Eastern 2–7 Yau Tsim Mong	5
4	Round 12: 28 January 2007	Double Flower 0–5 Tung Po	5
4	Round 18: 18 March 2007	Fukien 6–1 Eastern	5
