= CU Micaelense =

Portuguese football club

U. Micaelense
- Full name: Clube União Micaelense
- Founded: 1911
- Ground: Campo Municipal Jâcome Correia; Ponta Delgada, Azores; Portugal
- Capacity: 1,500
- Chairman: Manuel Arruda
- League: AF Ponta Delgada 1ª Divisão
Home colours

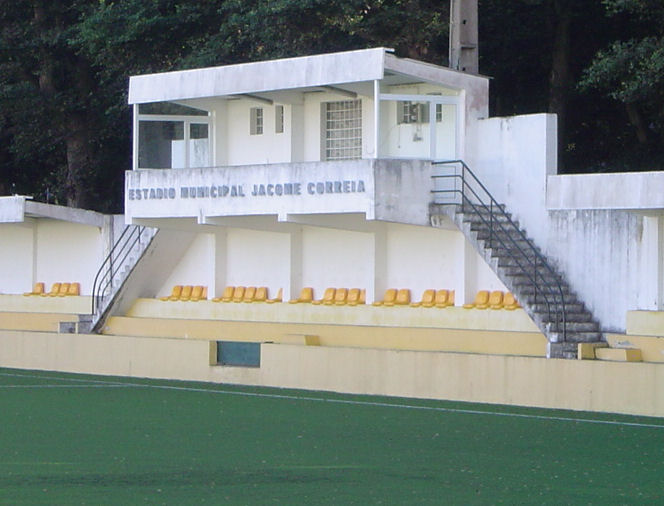
The administration block of Campo Municipal Jâcome Correia

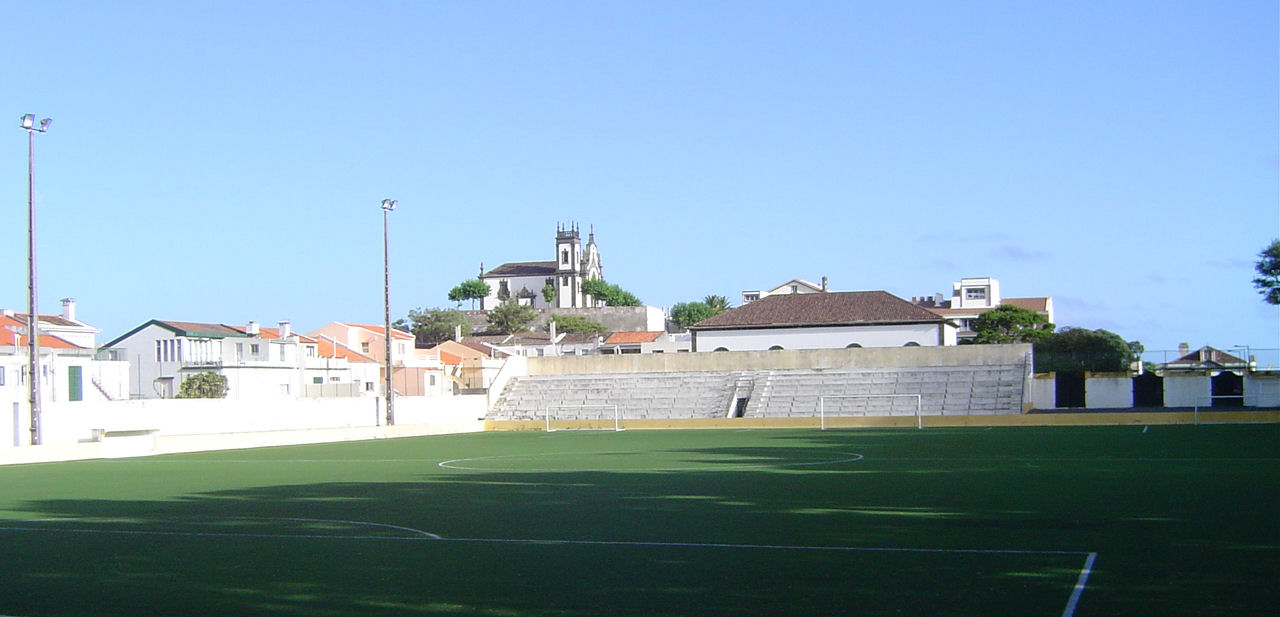
Setting of the stadium in Ponta Delgada

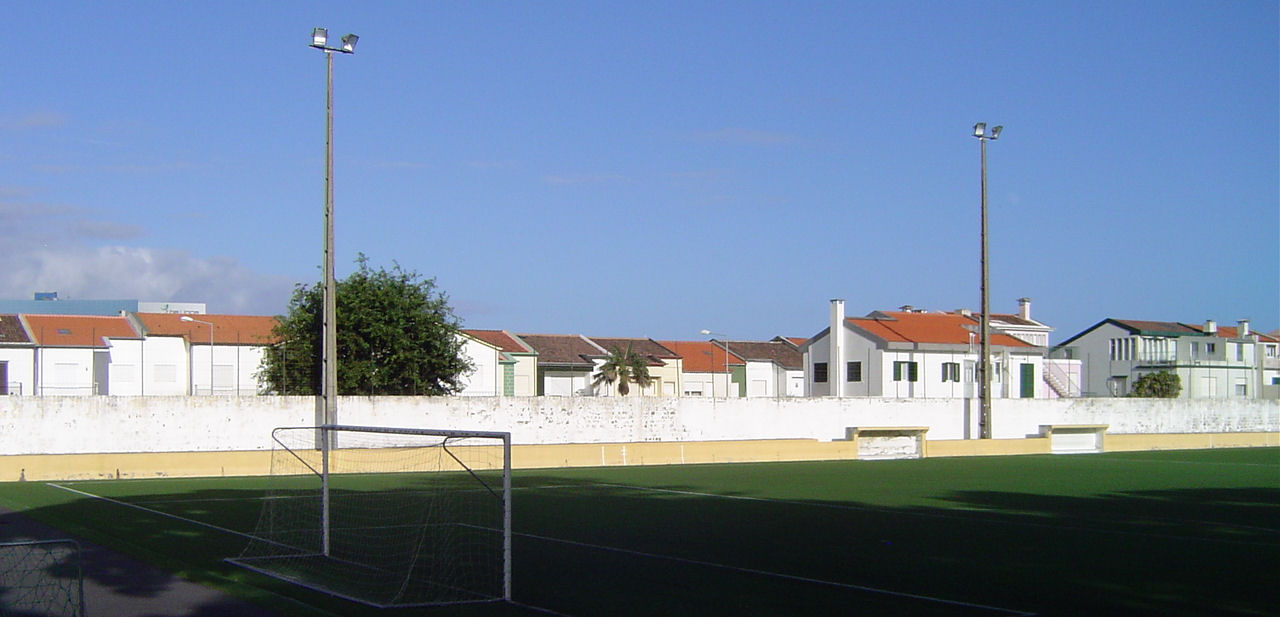
Eastern view of the ground

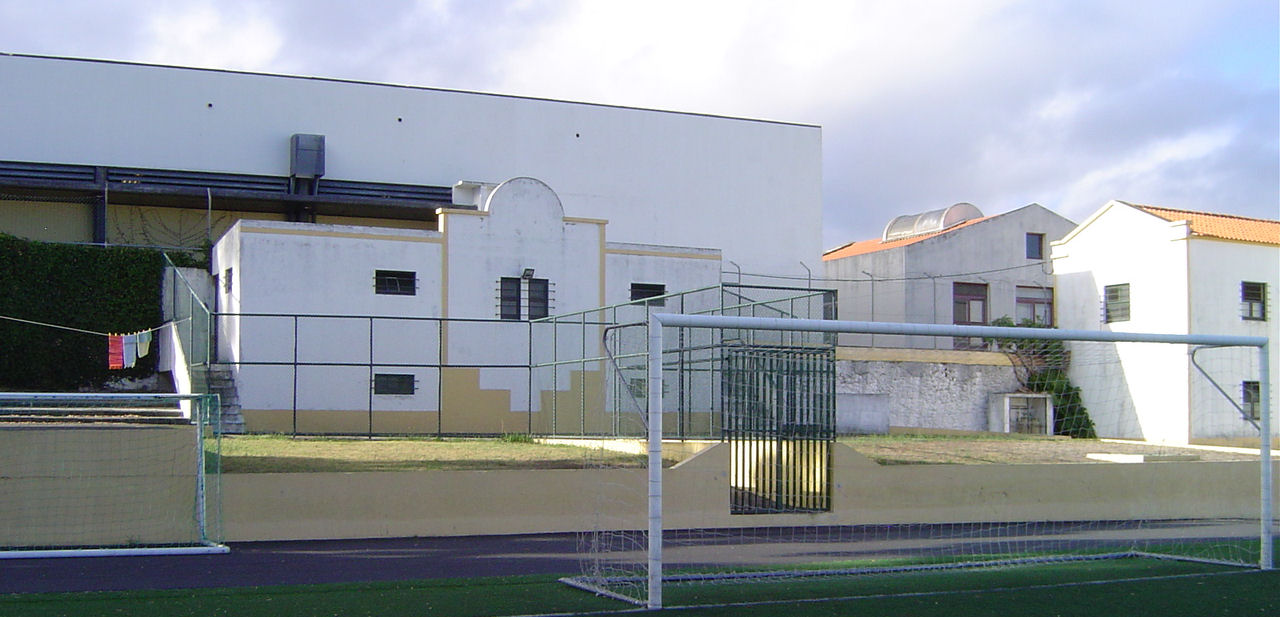
Changing rooms

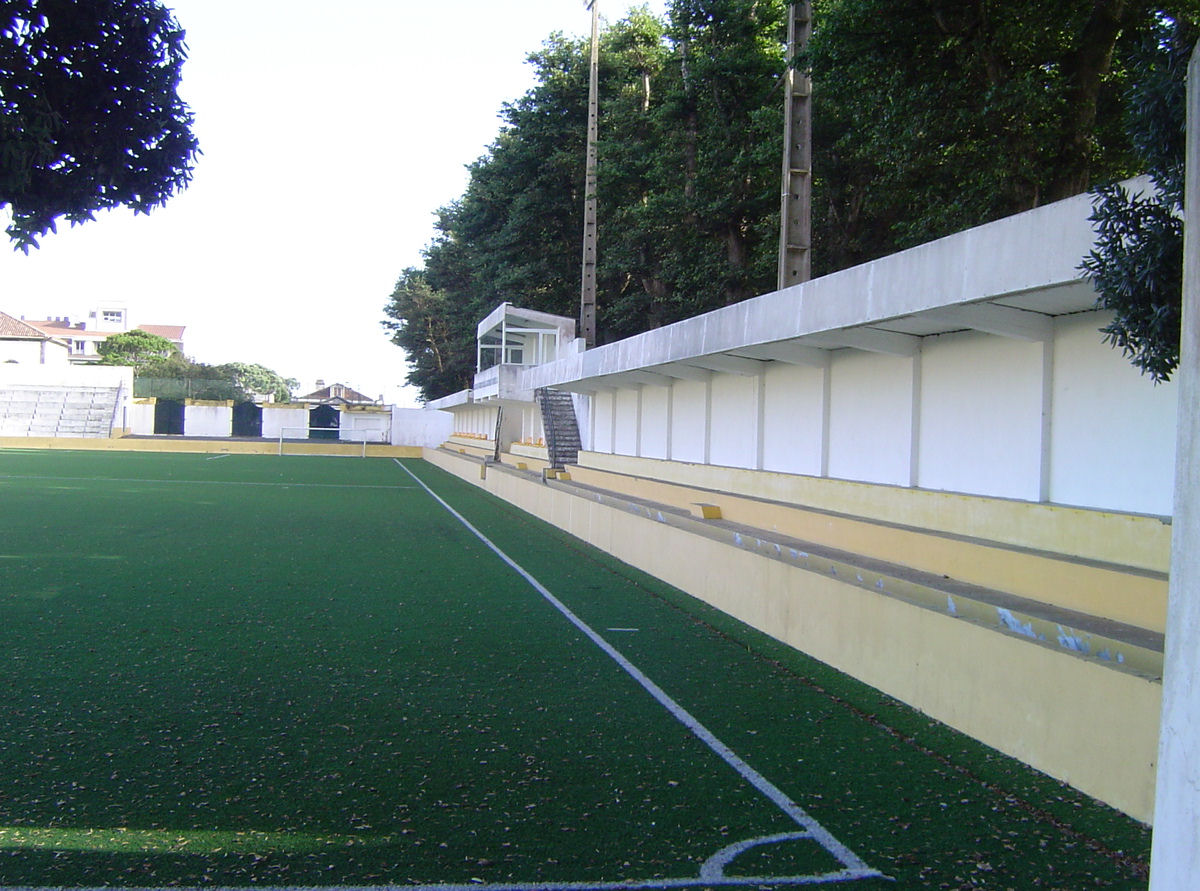
Covered standing area

Clube União Micaelense (known as CU Micaelense or U. Micaelense), is a Portuguese football club based in Ponta Delgada, Azores on the island of São Miguel in the Azores.

== Background ==
CU Micaelense currently plays in the AF Ponta Delgada 1ª Divisão (known as the Campeonato de S. Miguel) which is the fifth tier of Portuguese football. The club was founded in 1911 and they currently play their home matches at the Campo Municipal Jâcome Correia in Ponta Delgada. The stadium is able to accommodate 1,500 spectators.

The club is affiliated to Associação de Futebol de Ponta Delgada and has competed in the AF Ponta Delgada Taça. The club has also entered the national cup competition known as Taça de Portugal on many occasions.

== History ==
Clube União Micaelense was founded in late 1911 but it has links to the Sociedade Promotora da Agricultura Micaelense (English: Promotional Society of Micalense Agriculture) and Sociedade dos Amigos das Letras e Artes (English: Society of Friends of Arts and Letters) which was founded on 9 September 1848 by António Feliciano de Castilho. The new Clube União Micaelense specialised in a number of sports including football and made use of a field at Mercado Agrícola in São Gonçalo.

The club won the Campeonato de Ponta Delgada (District Championship) in 1928–29, 1945–46, 1946–47, 1947–48, 1955–56, 1958–59, 1959–69, 1960–61, 1961–62, 1962–63, 1963–64, 1964–65, 1965–66, 1966–67 and 1967–68 but first came to national prominence in 1961-62 when they proceeded to the quarter-finals of the Taça de Portugal before going out 2-1 and 8–1 over two legs to Vitoria Guimaraes. To get to this stage Micaelense won a qualifying tournament at the expense of Angústias Atlético of Horta, SC Lusitânia and finally CS Marítimo of Madeira. The results of the qualifying tournament were:

18 March 1962: Clube União Micaelense 4 Angústias Atlético Clube 1
20 March 1962: Clube União Micaelense 2 Sport Clube Lusitânia 2

Açores – Madeira Elimination Final

6 April 1962: Clube União Micaelense 2 Clube Sport Marítimo 0
8 April 1962: Clube União Micaelense 1 Clube Sport Marítimo 2

The attendances at these matches and the trip to play Vitoria Guimaraes on the mainland represented a huge event at that time. Micaelense were represented by João Maciel, Tibério A. M. Ribeiro, João M. R. Carroça, José T. Amorim, João M. Arruda, Rui S. Martins, Fernando C. Raposo, Miguel C. Dias, Manuel V. Félix, José da Silva, D. A. Santos Pereira, Manuel Luís da M. J. Costa, Octávio M. F. Pacheco and Eugénio R. Oliveira and the head coach was Henrique Ben David.

Micaelense have never been able to match their quarter-final appearance in the 1961-62 Taça de Portugal but in 2002-03 did reach the fifth round of the competition following victories against Casa Pia (4–2), Esposende (3–0), Sp.Pombal (3-3, 5-4 pens) before finally bowing out 4–1 away to Académica.

In terms of league success Micaelense first gained promotion to the Terceira Divisão at the end of the 1993–94 season. In their first season in Série E of the Terceira Divisão (Third Division) the club finished in 15th place and should have been relegated. However, they were offered a reprieve with the formation of the Terceira Divisão Série Açores. The club had a successful period in this new competition, which culminated in them winning the championship in the 1999–2000 season.

In 2000–01 Micaelense played in Segunda Divisão Série Sul (Second Division South) for the first time but were relegated at the end of the season. They returned a year later and played third-tier football for the next 4 seasons, the most successful being in 2003–04 when the club finished in third position. Relegation arose at the end of the 2005–06 followed by six seasons back in the Terceira Divisão Série Açores, during which there has been a gradual decline in the club's fortunes. The descent culminated in a further relegation at the end of the 2011–12 season and they are now back in the Campeonato de Ponta Delgada (District Championship) where they previously played up until 1993–94.

The most famous player to have appeared for the club is Pauleta, former star of Paris Saint-Germain. However, he left the islands at the age of 16, and only learned his basic skills at U. Micaelense.

The club's derby rival for a number of years were CD Operário from the neighbouring town of Lagoa. Also the team from FC Madalena, the capital Pico Island, has been considered a part of local rivalry.

The club previously played at Campo da Grotinha.

== Season to season ==
Season	Level	Division	Section	Place	Movements
1990–91	Tier 5	Distritais	AF Ponta Delgada - 1ª Divisão		
1991–92	Tier 5	Distritais	AF Ponta Delgada - 1ª Divisão		
1992–93	Tier 5	Distritais	AF Ponta Delgada - 1ª Divisão		
1993–94	Tier 5	Distritais	AF Ponta Delgada - 1ª Divisão		Promoted
1994–95	Tier 4	Terceira Divisão	Série E	15th	
1995–96	Tier 4	Terceira Divisão	Série Açores - 1ª Fase	3rd	Promotion Group
	Tier 4	Terceira Divisão	Série Açores Primeiros	2nd	
1996–97	Tier 4	Terceira Divisão	Série Açores - 1ª Fase	2nd	Promotion Group
	Tier 4	Terceira Divisão	Série Açores Primeiros	2nd	
1997–98	Tier 4	Terceira Divisão	Série Açores - 1ª Fase	2nd	Promotion Group
	Tier 4	Terceira Divisão	Série Açores Primeiros	2nd	
1998–99	Tier 4	Terceira Divisão	Série Açores - 1ª Fase	2nd	Promotion Group
	Tier 4	Terceira Divisão	Série Açores Primeiros	2nd	
1999–2000	Tier 4	Terceira Divisão	Série Açores - 1ª Fase	1st	Promotion Group
	Tier 4	Terceira Divisão	Série Açores Primeiros	1st	Promoted
2000–01	Tier 3	Segunda Divisão	Série Sul	17th	Relegated
2001–02	Tier 4	Terceira Divisão	Série Açores - 1ª Fase	1st	Promotion Group
	Tier 4	Terceira Divisão	Série Açores Primeiros	1st	Promoted
2002–03	Tier 3	Segunda Divisão	Série Sul	11th	
2003–04	Tier 3	Segunda Divisão	Série Sul	3rd	
2004–05	Tier 3	Segunda Divisão	Série Sul	12th	
2005–06	Tier 3	Segunda Divisão	Série D	10th	Relegated
2006–07	Tier 4	Terceira Divisão	Série Açores - 1ª Fase	1st	Promotion Group
	Tier 4	Terceira Divisão	Série Açores Primeiros	2nd	
2007–08	Tier 4	Terceira Divisão	Série Açores - 1ª Fase	1st	Promotion Group
	Tier 4	Terceira Divisão	Série Açores Primeiros	3rd	
2008–09	Tier 4	Terceira Divisão	Série Açores - 1ª Fase	7th	Relegation Group
	Tier 4	Terceira Divisão	Série Açores Últimos	3rd	
2009–10	Tier 4	Terceira Divisão	Série Açores - 1ª Fase	7th	Relegation Group
	Tier 4	Terceira Divisão	Série Açores Últimos	3rd	
2010–11	Tier 4	Terceira Divisão	Série Açores - 1ª Fase	5th	Relegation Group
	Tier 4	Terceira Divisão	Série Açores Últimos	2nd	
2011–12	Tier 4	Terceira Divisão	Série Açores - 1ª Fase	8th	Relegation Group
	Tier 4	Terceira Divisão	Série Açores Últimos	5th	Relegated
2012–13	Tier 5	Distritais	AF Ponta Delgada - 1ª Divisão		

== Honours ==
- Terceira Divisão: 1999–00

== Notable former players ==
- (Portugal) Hugo Nunes Coelho
- (Portugal) Pauleta
- (Portugal) Nuno Sociedade
- (Portugal) Tininho

== Notable former managers ==
- (Portugal) Quim
