= Sergio Aure =

Spanish footballer

Personal information
- Full name: Sergio Aure Esquerre
- Date of birth: 20 August 1986 (age 40)
- Place of birth: Amposta, Spain
- Height: 1.86 m (6 ft 1 in)
- Position: Goalkeeper

Senior career*
Years	Team	Apps	(Gls)
- Rapitenca
2007–2008	Terrassa	5	(0)
2008–2009	Badalona	0	(0)
2009–2010	Kitchee	14	(0)
2010	Comarca de Níjar	1	(0)
	Milsami	0	(0)
- Remolins-Bitem
–2013	Comarca de Níjar	25+	(0+)
- Vinaròs
2016	Skallagrímur	12	(0)
–2017	Masdenverge	1+	(0+)
2017–	Aldeana	60	(0)
- * Club domestic league appearances and goals

Sergio Aure Esquerre (born 20 August 1986) is a Spanish footballer who plays as a goalkeeper for Aldeana.

== Career ==
In 2009, Aure signed for Kitchee, Hong Kong's most successful club, where he made 14 league appearances, after playing for Badalona in the Spanish third division.

In 2010, he signed for Moldovan side Milsami after playing for Comarca de Níjar in the Spanish fourth division.

In 2013, he signed for Spanish fifth division team Vinaròs.

Before the 2016 season, Aure signed for Skallagrímur in the Icelandic fifth division.

In 2017, he signed for Spanish seventh division outfit Aldeana.
