= Zhang Jianzhong =

Chinese footballer

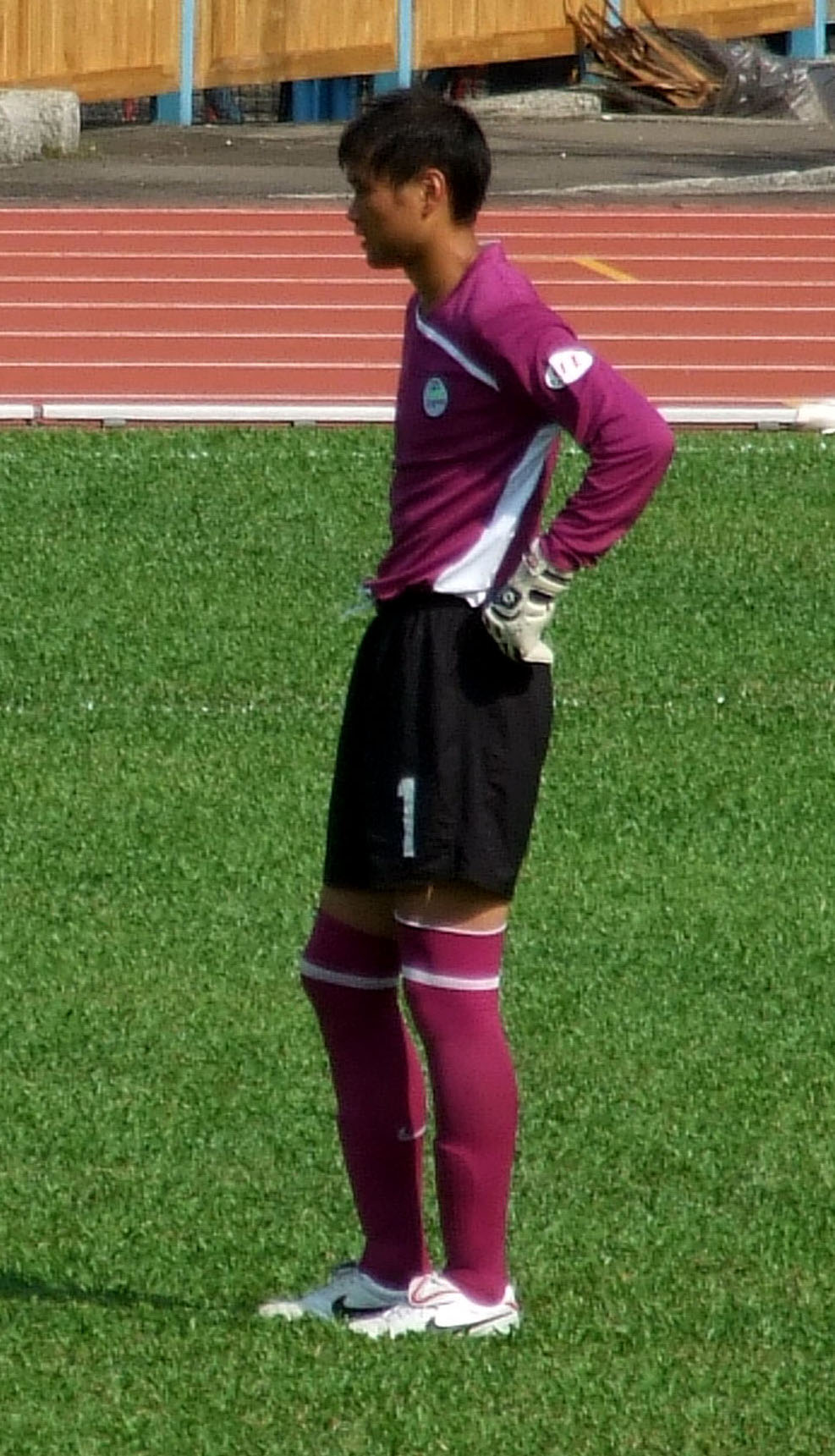

Personal information
- Full name: Zhang Jianzhong
- Date of birth: 18 September 1985 (age 41)
- Place of birth: Guangzhou, Guangdong, China
- Height: 1.82 m (6 ft 0 in)
- Position: Goalkeeper

Youth career
- 2003–2005: Guangdong Youth

Senior career*
Years	Team	Apps	(Gls)
2006	Ningbo Huaao		
2006–2009	South China	2	(0)
2010	Sun Hei	6	(0)
- * Club domestic league appearances and goals as of 13:36, 7 September 2010 (UTC)

Zhang Jianzhong (simplified Chinese: 张健忠; traditional Chinese: 張健忠, born 18 September 1985) is a Chinese former professional association football player.

== Career statistics in Hong Kong ==
As of 3 September 2009

Club	Season	League		Senior Shield		League Cup		FA Cup		AFC Cup		Total	
Club	Season	Apps	Goals	Apps	Goals	Apps	Goals	Apps	Goals	Apps	Goals	Apps	Goals
South China	2006–07	0 (0)	0	0 (0)	0	0 (2)	0	0 (0)	0	N/A	N/A	0 (2)	0
South China	2007–08	1 (0)	0	0 (0)	0	1 (0)	0	0 (0)	0	N/A	N/A	2 (0)	0
South China	2008–09	1 (0)	0	0 (0)	0	0 (0)	0	0 (0)	0	N/A	N/A	1 (0)	0
All		2 (0)	0	0 (0)	0	1 (2)	0	0 (0)	0	0 (0)	0	3 (2)	0
