= Marco Almeida =

Portuguese footballer (born 1977)

Personal information
- Full name: Marco António Bernardo Paracana Almeida
- Date of birth: 4 April 1977 (age 49)
- Place of birth: Barreiro, Portugal
- Height: 1.85 m (6 ft 1 in)
- Position: Centre back

Youth career
- 1988–1995: Sporting CP

Senior career*
Years	Team	Apps	(Gls)
1995–2000	Sporting CP	5	(2)
1995–1996	→ Casa Pia (loan)	16	(0)
1996–1998	→ Lourinhanense (loan)	4	(0)
1998–1999	→ Campomaiorense (loan)	21	(2)
1999	→ Southampton (loan)	1	(0)
2000–2001	Campomaiorense	20	(1)
2001–2004	Alverca	76	(5)
2004–2005	Ciudad Murcia	3	(0)
2005–2006	Maia	23	(1)
2006–2007	Portimonense	24	(2)
2007–2008	Nea Salamis	3	(0)
2008–2009	Lourosa	9	(2)
2009–2011	Akritas Chlorakas	36	(2)
Total		241	(17)

International career
1996–1997	Portugal U20	14	(0)
1998–2000	Portugal U21	18	(3)
- * Club domestic league appearances and goals

Marco António Bernardo Paracana Almeida (born 4 April 1977) is a Portuguese retired footballer who played as a central defender.

He started his career with Sporting, going on to amass Primeira Liga totals of 90 games and five goals over the course of six seasons, also representing in the competition Campomaiorense and Alverca. He also played professionally in England, Spain and Cyprus.

== Club career ==
Almeida was born in Barreiro, Setúbal District, and played youth football with Sporting CP. He started his senior career with Casa Pia A.C. on loan, moving to Sporting Clube Lourinhanense in 1996 as the latter acted as farm team to the Primeira Liga giants. For the 1998–99 season, still in the top division, he was again loaned, now to S.C. Campomaiorense.

In July 1999, Almeida was signed by Southampton's manager Dave Jones on a year's loan, with a view to a permanent move. After impressing in pre-season friendlies he made his first-team debut as a 71st-minute substitute for Claus Lundekvam in a Premier League match against Arsenal at the Dell, on 19 September 1999: within eight minutes, he was alongside fellow substitute Thierry Henry just outside the Southampton area, when the latter received a pass from Tony Adams. He stumbled while trying to clear the ball, allowing Henry to wrap his foot around the ball and send a rocket of a shot into the far corner of the Southampton net, in what was the Frenchman's first goal in English football.

Although Almeida made a few appearances for the Saints' reserves, including scoring in a 2–2 draw with Chelsea on 22 September 1999, he was never again called into the main squad and, in December, the loan was cancelled. Also in the United Kingdom, he would also have unsuccessful trials with Bolton Wanderers in September 2000 and Cardiff City (managed by former Southampton boss Jones) in 2007; subsequently he returned to Sporting, being released in the following summer after which he re-joined Campomaiorense, now as a free agent.

Almeida's most steady period came at F.C. Alverca, which he helped promote from the Segunda Liga in 2002–03 by netting a career-best five times in 32 games. After three seasons he moved abroad again, going almost unnoticed at Ciudad de Murcia – Spanish Segunda División – and he subsequently returned to his country, playing one campaign apiece with second level sides F.C. Maia and Portimonense SC.

In the following years, already in his 30s, Almeida alternated between the Portuguese lower leagues and Cypriot football.
