= Flávio Barros (footballer, born 1978) =

Brazilian footballer

Flavio Barros
Personal information
- Full name: Flavio Barros Souza
- Date of birth: January 23, 1978 (age 48)
- Place of birth: Rio de Janeiro, Brazil
- Height: 1.89 m (6 ft 2 in)
- Position: Center forward

Youth career
- 1996–2000: Vasco da Gama

Senior career*
Years	Team	Apps	(Gls)
2000	Campo Grande		
2000–2001	Barcelona de Guayaquil		
2001–2002	Nacional		
2002–2003	Necaxa		
2003–2004	Flamengo		
2004–2005	Racing de Ferrol		
2006	América		
2007	Vila Nova		
2007	South China		
2008–2009	Ethnikos Piraeus		
2009	CRAC		
2009–2010	Maghreb Fez		
2010	América do Recife		
2011	Ceres		
2012	Araguaína		
2013	4 de Julho		
2014	Santo Ângelo		
- * Club domestic league appearances and goals

Flavio Barros Souza (born 23 January 1978) is a Brazilian former football striker.

Flávio previously played for Flamengo in Campeonato Brasileiro Série A, Barcelona in Serie A de Ecuador and Necaxa in the Primera División de México.

== Honours ==
Nacional

- Primera División: 2000

Flamengo

- Campeonato Carioca: 2004
