= Colin Baker (Irish footballer) =

Irish footballer

Personal information
- Full name: Colin Patrick Baker
- Date of birth: 29 October 1985 (age 41)
- Place of birth: Limerick, Ireland
- Position: Winger

Senior career*
Years	Team	Apps	(Gls)
2004–2005	Aylesbury United	25	(3)
2005–2006	Stevenage Borough	0	(0)
2005–2006	→ Chesham United (loan)	?	(?)
2005–2006	Windsor & Eton	4	(0)
2006–2007	Rangers (HK)	1	(0)
2007–2008	Hong Kong FC	22	(26)
2008	Limerick 37	14	(1)
- Aisling Anacotty
- Fairview Rangers
- Geraldines
- Pike Rovers
- * Club domestic league appearances and goals

Colin Patrick Baker (born 29 October 1985), also known as Colin Scanlan, is an Irish former footballer.

== Career ==
He started his career at Aylesbury United, and played for other non-league clubs up until 2006, where he moved to play football in Hong Kong. There, he represented Rangers and Hong Kong FC, before returning to his native Ireland to join Limerick 37. He only scored one goal for Limerick, a late equaliser against Shelbourne, which denied Shelbourne the title and promotion in the 2008 season. He left the club at the end of the season, but stayed in the area to play locally in the Limerick & District League. He is currently the youth academy coach at Limerick.
