= Engelo Rumora =

- Born: Australia
- Occupations: Real estate executive, investor
- Website: engelorumora.com

Engelo Rumora is a real estate executive, investor, and former association football player. He is the CEO and founder of a real estate investment company called Ohio Cashflow located in Toledo, Ohio, US.

== Career ==
His knowledge into investment coupled with construction knowledge led him to buy his first property in Victoria, Australia in 2012. Within the next six months, he bought seven more properties. After this, Engelo decided to move to the U.S.

After moving to the US, Engelo founded the turnkey real estate investment company, Ohio Cashflow. Ohio Cashflow specializes in providing turnkey properties in the Toledo, Dayton, Cincinnati and Columbus, Ohio markets.

In 2014 Rumora named 30under30 by Anthill Magazine. In 2018, Rumora featured in TLC episode “This Is Life Live". In 2018 and 2019, Ohio Cashflow named to Inc. magazine’s list of the 5,000 fastest-growing private companies in America.

=== Oz Realty ===
Engelo is also the co-founder of a property management company in Toledo, Ohio called Oz Realty.
