= Antônio Picoli =

Brazilian footballer and manager (born 1972)

Personal information
- Full name: Edemar Antônio Picoli
- Date of birth: April 28, 1972 (age 54)
- Place of birth: Caibi (SC), Brazil
- Position: Defensive midfielder

Team information
- Current team: Pelotas (manager)

Senior career*
Years	Team	Apps	(Gls)
1993	Palmeirense		
1994	15 de Novembro		
1994	Guarani-VA		
1995–1997	Juventude		
1998	→ América-RN (loan)		
1999	Juventude		
2000–2002	Coritiba		
2003	Guangdong Hongyuan	22	(3)
2005	Juventude		
2006	CSA		
2006–2007	South China	2	(0)
2007–2008	Eastern	7	(0)

Managerial career
- 2010–2012: Juventude
- 2012–2014: Caxias
- 2014: Ferroviária
- 2014: Juventude
- 2015: Operário-PR
- 2017: Ferroviária
- 2017: Capivariano
- 2017: Brusque
- 2018–2019: Maringá
- 2019–: Pelotas
- * Club domestic league appearances and goals

Edemar Antonio Picoli (born 28 April 1972) is a Brazilian former football player and current coach. He played in Hong Kong First Division League club South China before in 2006–07 season. He joined the team in 2006 as one of the first immediate signings by Casemiro Mior after re-taking his position as South China head coach.

After the 2006–07 season, South China convenor Steven Lo announced that Picoli will not stay in the team in the next season.

He scored once for Eastern on the 2007-08 league match against Wofoo Tai Po. However, the match result was cancelled due to a technical mistake made by the referee.

== Honours ==
=== Player ===
Juventude

- Copa do Brasil: 1999

=== Manager ===
Juventude

- Copa FGF: 2011

== Career statistics ==
As of 23 December 2007

Club	Season	League		Senior Shield		League Cup		FA Cup		AFC Cup		Total	
Club	Season	Apps	Goals	Apps	Goals	Apps	Goals	Apps	Goals	Apps	Goals	Apps	Goals
South China	2006-07	0 (2)	0	0 (0)	0	3 (0)	0	0 (0)	0	NA	NA	3 (2)	0
South China	All	0 (2)	0	0 (0)	0	3 (0)	0	0 (0)	0	NA	NA	3 (2)	0
Eastern	2007-08	7 (0)	0	2 (0)	0	0 (0)	0	0 (0)	0	NA	NA	9 (0)	0
Eastern	All	7 (0)	0	2 (0)	0	0 (0)	0	0 (0)	0	NA	NA	9 (0)	0
