= Cleiton (footballer, born 1978) =

Brazilian footballer

Personal information
- Full name: Cleiton Mendes dos Santos
- Date of birth: 12 September 1978 (age 48)
- Place of birth: Brasília, Brazil
- Height: 1.81 m (5 ft 11 in)
- Position: Midfielder

Senior career*
Years	Team	Apps	(Gls)
2007	Santa Cruz		
2007	→ South China (loan)	0	(0)
2011	Juazeiro	7	(0)
2011–2012	Comercial-PI	7	(0)
2014	Cori-Sabbá	8	(0)
- * Club domestic league appearances and goals

Cleiton Mendes dos Santos, known as Cleiton, (born 12 September 1978) is a Brazilian former footballer who played as a midfielder.

== Club career ==
He joined Hong Kong First Division League team South China for a short-term loan in 2007 as a strengthening of the squad for Hong Kong FA Cup 2006–07. As he did not meet the deadline of league player registration, he could not represent SCAA for the league matches in the season. He scored his only goal for South China in his debut match against Wofoo Tai Po and South China won 3–0 in this quarter-final match of FA Cup.

== Career statistics in Hong Kong ==
As of 19 May 2007

Club	Season	League		Senior Shield		League Cup		FA Cup		AFC Cup		Total	
Club	Season	Apps	Goals	Apps	Goals	Apps	Goals	Apps	Goals	Apps	Goals	Apps	Goals
South China	2006-07	0 (0)	0	0 (0)	0	0 (0)	0	4 (0)	1	NA	NA	4 (0)	1
South China	All	0 (0)	0	0 (0)	0	0 (0)	0	4 (0)	1	NA	NA	4 (0)	1
