= Nuno Cavaleiro =

Portuguese footballer

Personal information
- Full name: Nuno Miguel Mendes Cavaleiro
- Date of birth: 7 January 1976 (age 50)
- Place of birth: Lisbon, Portugal
- Height: 1.84 m (6 ft 1/2 in)
- Position: Winger

Youth career
- 1988–1991: Sacavenense
- 1991–1994: Belenenses

Senior career*
Years	Team	Apps	(Gls)
1994–1997	Olivais Moscavide	59	(6)
1997–1998	Machico	31	(1)
1998–1999	Famalicão	29	(5)
1999–2000	Braga B	25	(4)
1999–2000	Braga	10	(0)
2000–2001	Moreirense	37	(9)
2001–2002	Estrela Amadora	15	(0)
2002–2003	Moreirense	7	(1)
2003–2006	Vizela	84	(18)
2006–2008	Moreirense	30	(5)
2007	→ South China (loan)	1	(0)
2008–2009	Oliveirense	28	(4)
2009–2010	Famalicão	22	(2)
Total		378	(55)

International career
1992	Portugal U17	2	(0)
- * Club domestic league appearances and goals

Nuno Miguel Mendes Cavaleiro (born 7 January 1976 in Lisbon) is a Portuguese former professional footballer who played as a winger.
