= André Correia (footballer) =

Portuguese footballer

Personal information
- Full name: André Gil Gomes Correia Costa
- Date of birth: 9 February 1979 (age 47)
- Place of birth: Porto, Portugal
- Height: 1.86 m (6 ft 1 in)
- Position: Centre back

Youth career
- 1989–1998: Porto

Senior career*
Years	Team	Apps	(Gls)
1998–1999	Maia	11	(1)
1999–2000	Porto B	29	(0)
2000–2001	Alverca	3	(0)
2002	Penafiel	14	(0)
2002–2003	Alverca	1	(0)
2003–2004	Chaves	41	(2)
2004–2006	Espinho	41	(0)
2006	South China	5	(0)
2007–2008	Portosantense	34	(0)
2008–2009	Pontassolense	30	(0)
2009–2010	Aliados Lordelo	28	(0)
2010–2011	Espinho	18	(0)
2011–2012	Gondomar	28	(0)
2012–2013	Infesta	18	(1)
2013–2014	Canidelo	14	(1)
Total		315	(5)

International career
1998–1999	Portugal U20	17	(3)
2001	Portugal U21	3	(0)
- * Club domestic league appearances and goals

André Gil Gomes Correia Costa (born 9 February 1979), known as Correia, is a Portuguese retired footballer who played as a central defender.

== Club career ==
Born in Porto, Correia was a youth product of hometown's FC Porto, never appearing officially for its first team and going to play three Primeira Liga matches with F.C. Alverca in the 2000–01 season. From January 2002–June 2005 he represented, in the second division, Alverca, F.C. Penafiel, G.D. Chaves and S.C. Espinho.

Correia was one of five Portuguese players signed by South China AA in the 2006 off-season along with compatriot manager António Amaral, being referred by the team and local media as André Costa (Chinese: A哥斯達). After a series of disappointing performances he was released, returning to his country and going on to resume his career exclusively in the third level, with a host of clubs.

== International career ==
Correia represented Portugal at the 1999 FIFA World Youth Championship in Nigeria, making three appearances in an eventual round-of-16 exit.
