= Shek Kip Mei SA =

Shek Kip Mei Sports Association (Chinese: 石硤尾體育會) was a Hong Kong football club which played in the Hong Kong First Division League. It is better known as Workable FC (Chinese: 華家堡足球會) and Tuen Mun Progoal FC (Chinese: 屯門普高足球會), which are under the football division of the Hong Kong Football Association from 2007 to 2009.

== History ==
The team got the 1st Runner-up in Hong Kong Third A Division League in 2005–06 season and qualified into Third Division League Final Round to fight for 2 promotion positions among 4 teams. Shek Kip Mei topped the table and was promoted to Second Division.

=== Workable (2007–2008) ===
Logo of the team in 2007–2008 season.

After the promotion, the team added a few former Hong Kong national football team players to strengthen the team for further promotion to the First Division. The team finished second in the Second Division in the 2006–07 season and has been promoted to the First Division in 2007–08.

After the promotion, the team obtained an HK$4,000,000 naming sponsorship from Workable Corporation and was named as Workable Football Club to compete in First Division League. The team released all the promotion heroes in Shek Kip Mei and obtained a few players from the extinct Hong Kong 08 as the stem of team construction.

They played its debut match in First Division on 8 September 2007, drawing 2–2 with Tai Po in Mong Kok Stadium. The match was also highlighted by that Workable manager Chan Hiu Ming was the head coach of Tai Po in the previous season.

The club dissolved after the end of the 2007–08 season, which they finished 9th out of 10 teams in First Division.

=== Tuen Mun Progoal (2008–2009) ===
The team was renamed as Tuen Mun Progoal for the 2008–09 Hong Kong First Division League season, after lending its entry to Progoal Limited. However, in November 2009, Shek Kip Mei was disqualified because Tuen Mun Progoal defaulted labour insurance.

== Honours ==
- Second Division
  - Runners-up (1): 2006–07
- Third Division Final
  - Winners (1): 2005–06
- Third Division "A"
  - Runners-up (1): 2005–06

== Sponsors ==
Period	Kit Manufacturer	Kit sponsor
2007–2008	Adidas	Crocodile Garments

== Recent seasons ==
Season		Pos.	Pl.	W	D	L	GS	GA	P	Senior Shield	League Cup	FA Cup	Asia	Notes
2006–07	D2	2	20	14	4	2	68	18	46					promoted
2007–08	D1	9	18	3	6	9	14	34	15	first round	group stage	first round		Team name had changed to Workable Football Club for 1 season.
