= Hugo Coelho =

Portuguese footballer

Personal information
- Full name: Hugo Nunes Coelho
- Date of birth: 30 October 1980 (age 45)
- Place of birth: Mafamude, Portugal
- Height: 1.86 m (6 ft 1 in)
- Position: Centre back

Youth career
- 1991–1999: Fiães

Senior career*
Years	Team	Apps	(Gls)
1999–2001	Fiães		
2001–2002	Milheiroense		
2002–2003	São João Ver	26	(2)
2003–2004	Académico Viseu	30	(1)
2004–2005	Micaelense	29	(2)
2005	Ovarense	12	(1)
2006	Micaelense	17	(0)
2006–2007	South China	11	(0)
2007–2008	Olympiakos Nicosia	13	(0)
2008–2010	AEP	47	(0)
2010–2011	Sektzia Ness Ziona		
2013–2014	AEP	10	(0)
2015–2016	ENAD	21	(0)
- * Club domestic league appearances and goals as of 10 April 2015

Hugo Nunes Coelho (born 30 October 1980) is a retired Portuguese footballer who played as a central defender.

== Football career ==
Born in Mafamude, Vila Nova de Gaia, Porto District, Coelho played mostly at amateur level in his country, his biggest achievement being appearing in 12 matches in the second division for A.D. Ovarense in 2005–06, in a relegation-ending season.

He played top flight football in Hong Kong (one year) and Cyprus (three).
