= Petri Jalava =

Finnish footballer (born 1976)

Petri Jalava (born 14 June 1976 in Turku) is a Finnish association football central defender. He currently plays for PK-35.

He was on trial to South China in December 2006, but failed to get a contract.

== Teams and clubs ==
- Turun Palloseura
- IFK Mora
- Åbo IFK
- Nybergsund IL
- ? - 2006: RoPS (Finnish second division)
- December 2006: South China AA (HK first division, trial)
- 2007: FC Viikingit (Finnish second division)
- 2008: PK-35 (Finnish second division)
