= Guam national football team results =

This article details the fixtures and results of the Guam national football team.

== Fixtures and results ==
Guam's score is shown first in each case.

Guam national football team results
No.	Date	Venue	Opponents	Score	Competition	Guam scorers	Att.	Ref.
1	2 August 1975	Tumon (H)	Solomon Islands	1–5	1975 South Pacific Games	Unknown	–	
2	4 August 1975	Tumon (H)	Fiji	0–11	1975 South Pacific Games		–	
3	29 August 1979	Buckhurst Park, Suva (N)	New Hebrides	0–4	1979 South Pacific Games		–	
4	30 August 1979	Buckhurst Park, Suva (N)	New Caledonia	1–10	1979 South Pacific Games	Unknown	–	
5	5 September 1979	Ratu Cakobau Park, Nausori (N)	Western Samoa	4–2	1979 South Pacific Games	Unknown	–	
6	6 September 1979	Ratu Cakobau Park, Nausori (N)	Tuvalu	7–2	1979 South Pacific Games	Unknown	–	
7	10 September 1991	Sir Ignatius Kilage Stadium, Lae (N)	Tahiti	0–15	1991 South Pacific Games		–	
8	12 September 1991	Sir Ignatius Kilage Stadium, Lae (N)	Fiji	1–14	1991 South Pacific Games	Urbano	–	
9	14 September 1991	Sir Ignatius Kilage Stadium, Lae (N)	New Caledonia	0–18	1991 South Pacific Games		–	
10	18 September 1991	Sir Ignatius Kilage Stadium, Lae (N)	Wallis and Futuna	0–5	1991 South Pacific Games		–	
11	7 December 1993	Port Vila (N)	Tahiti	0–11	1993 South Pacific Mini Games		–	
12	11 December 1993	Port Vila (N)	Solomon Islands	1–12	1993 South Pacific Mini Games	Unknown	–	
13	13 December 1993	Port Vila (N)	Fiji	0–12	1993 South Pacific Mini Games		–	
14	16 August 1995	Papeete (N)	Vanuatu	0–6	1995 South Pacific Games		–	
15	20 August 1995	Papeete (N)	Fiji	0–8	1995 South Pacific Games		–	
16	22 August 1995	Papeete (N)	Papua New Guinea	0–9	1995 South Pacific Games		–	
17	5 August 1996	Thong Nhat Stadium, Ho Chi Minh City (N)	South Korea	0–9	1996 AFC Asian Cup qualification		–	
18	7 August 1996	Ho Chi Minh City (N)	Vietnam	0–9	1996 AFC Asian Cup qualification		192	
19	10 August 1996	Ho Chi Minh City (N)	Chinese Taipei	2–9	1996 AFC Asian Cup qualification	E. Cunliffe, Marinos	–	
20	30 July 1998	Emmaus High School Field, Koror (N)	Northern Mariana Islands	2–1	1998 Micronesian Games	Unknown	–	
21	1 August 1998	Emmaus High School Field, Koror (N)	Palau	15–2	1998 Micronesian Games	Unknown	–	
22	3 August 1998	Emmaus High School Field, Koror (N)	Northern Mariana Islands	0–3	1998 Micronesian Games		–	
23	6 June 1999	Guam (H)	Federated States of Micronesia	3–0	Friendly	Unknown	–	
24	7 June 1999	Guam (H)	Federated States of Micronesia	4–1	Friendly	Unknown	–	
25	8 June 1999	Guam (H)	Federated States of Micronesia	5–0	Friendly	Unknown	–	
26	23 January 2000	Thống Nhất Stadium, Ho Chi Minh City (N)	Vietnam	0–11	2000 AFC Asian Cup qualification		–	
27	26 January 2000	Thống Nhất Stadium, Ho Chi Minh City (N)	China	0–19	2000 AFC Asian Cup qualification		–	
28	29 January 2000	Thống Nhất Stadium, Ho Chi Minh City (N)	Philippines	0–2	2000 AFC Asian Cup qualification		–	
29	24 November 2000	Takhti Stadium, Tabriz (A)	Iran	0–19	2002 FIFA World Cup qualification		30,000	
30	26 November 2000	Takhti Stadium, Tabriz (N)	Tajikistan	0–16	2002 FIFA World Cup qualification		5,000	
31	24 February 2003	Hong Kong Stadium, Hong Kong (N)	Mongolia	0–2	2003 East Asian Football Championship		1,602	
32	26 February 2003	Hong Kong Stadium, Hong Kong (N)	Macau	0–2	2003 East Asian Football Championship		672	
33	28 February 2003	Hong Kong Stadium, Hong Kong (N)	Chinese Taipei	0–7	2003 East Asian Football Championship		1,814	
34	2 March 2003	Hong Kong Stadium, Hong Kong (A)	Hong Kong	0–11	2003 East Asian Football Championship		6,862	
35	23 April 2003	Thimphu (A)	Bhutan	0–6	2004 AFC Asian Cup qualification		–	
36	25 April 2003	Thimphu (N)	Mongolia	0–5	2004 AFC Asian Cup qualification		–	
37	5 March 2005	Zhongshan Soccer Stadium, Taipei (A)	Chinese Taipei	0–9	2005 East Asian Football Championship		–	
38	7 March 2005	Zhongshan Soccer Stadium, Taipei (N)	Hong Kong	0–15	2005 East Asian Football Championship		–	
39	9 March 2005	Zhongshan Soccer Stadium, Taipei (N)	Mongolia	1–4	2005 East Asian Football Championship	Pangelinan	–	
40	11 March 2005	Zhongshan Soccer Stadium, Taipei (N)	North Korea	0–21	2005 East Asian Football Championship		–	
41	1 April 2006	Bangabandhu Stadium, Dhaka (N)	Palestine	0–11	2006 AFC Challenge Cup		3,000	
42	3 April 2006	Bangabandhu Stadium, Dhaka (N)	Bangladesh	0–3	2006 AFC Challenge Cup		18,000	
43	6 April 2006	Bangabandhu Stadium, Dhaka (N)	Cambodia	0–3	2006 AFC Challenge Cup		500	
44	25 March 2007	Oleai Sports Complex, Saipan (A)	Northern Mariana Islands	3–2	2008 East Asian Football Championship	Jamison, Pangelinan (2)	—	
45	1 April 2007	Guam National Football Stadium, Hagåtña (H)	Northern Mariana Islands	9–0	2008 East Asian Football Championship	Pangelinan (5), Mendoza, Merfalen, Jamison, Calvo	1,324	
46	17 June 2007	Macau Stadium, Macau (N)	Chinese Taipei	0–10	2008 East Asian Football Championship		300	
47	21 June 2007	Macau Stadium, Macau (N)	Hong Kong	1–15	2008 East Asian Football Championship	Mendiola	300	
48	23 June 2007	Macau Stadium, Macau (N)	Mongolia	2–5	2008 East Asian Football Championship	Pangelinan, Mendiola	100	
49	2 April 2008	Zhongshan Soccer Stadium, Taipei (N)	Sri Lanka	1–5	2008 AFC Challenge Cup qualification	Mendiola	300	
50	4 April 2008	Zhongshan Soccer Stadium, Taipei (A)	Chinese Taipei	1–4	2008 AFC Challenge Cup qualification	Pangelinan	850	
51	6 April 2008	Zhongshan Soccer Stadium, Taipei (N)	Pakistan	2–9	2008 AFC Challenge Cup qualification	Pangelinan, I. Ahmed (o.g.)	200	
52	27 April 2008	Oleai Sports Complex, Saipan (A)	Northern Mariana Islands	3–2	Marianas Cup	Manibusan, unknown (o.g.), Cruz	—	

Notes

1. A: Guam played six matches at the 1998 Micronesian Games, however only three were against full international sides. The other matches against Pohnpei, Yap and Palau B is considered an unofficial matches.

=== 2008–2009 ===
Date	Tournament	Location	Home team	Score	Away team	Guam Scorers	Refs
2 April 2008	2008 AFC Challenge Cup qualification	(Chinese Taipei) Taipei	Sri Lanka	5:1	Guam	Christopher Mendiola 62'	
4 April 2008	2008 AFC Challenge Cup qualification	(Chinese Taipei) Taipei	Chinese Taipei	4:1	Guam	Zachary Pangelinan 17'	
6 April 2008	2008 AFC Challenge Cup qualification	(Chinese Taipei) Taipei	Pakistan	9:2	Guam	Zachary Pangelinan 74'; Iltaf Ahmed 80' (o.g.)	
27 April 2008	2008 Marianas Cup	(Northern Mariana Islands) Saipan	Northern Mariana Islands	2:3	Guam	David Manibusan 20'; Unknown 52' (o.g.); Matthew Cruz 95'	
11 March 2009	East Asian Football Championship 2010	(Guam) Yona	Guam	1:0	Mongolia	Christopher Mendiola 9'	
13 March 2009	East Asian Football Championship 2010	(Guam) Yona	Guam	2:1	Northern Mariana Islands	Josh Borja 10'; Ian Mariano 68'	
15 March 2009	East Asian Football Championship 2010	(Guam) Yona	Guam	2:2	Macau	Josh Borja 36'; Jason Cunliffe 90'	
23 August 2009	East Asian Football Championship 2010	(Chinese Taipei) Kaohsiung	Guam	2:9	North Korea	Josh Borja 1'; Jason Cunliffe 20'	
25 August 2009	East Asian Football Championship 2010	(Chinese Taipei) Kaohsiung	Chinese Taipei	4:2	Guam	Josh Borja 5', 26'	
27 August 2009	East Asian Football Championship 2010	(Chinese Taipei) Kaohsiung	Guam	0:12	Hong Kong		

=== 2010–present ===
Date	Tournament	Location	Home team	Score	Away team	Guam Scorers	Refs
19 June 2010	2010 Marianas Cup	(Northern Mariana Islands) Saipan	Northern Mariana Islands	1:1	Guam	Jason Cunliffe 89'	
30 November 2010	Friendly	(Guam) Yona	Guam	1:4	(Japan) Senshu University Select	Matthew Cruz	
27 August 2011	2011 Pacific Games	(New Caledonia) Noumea	Solomon Islands	7:0	Guam		
30 August 2011	2011 Pacific Games	(New Caledonia) Noumea	New Caledonia	9:0	Guam		
1 September 2011	2011 Pacific Games	(New Caledonia) Noumea	American Samoa	0:2	Guam	Dylan Naputi 49'; Elias Merfalen 70'	
3 September 2011	2011 Pacific Games	(New Caledonia) Noumea	Vanuatu	4:1	Guam	Jason Cunliffe 14'	
5 September 2011	2011 Pacific Games	(New Caledonia) Noumea	Tuvalu	1:1	Guam	Jason Cunliffe 18' (pen.)	
12 June 2012	Friendly	(Philippines) Bacolod	Philippines	3:0	Guam		
14 June 2012	Friendly	(Philippines) Manila	(Philippines) Global	5:3	Guam	Jason Cunliffe; Ian Adamos; Zachary DeVille 47'	
16 June 2012	Friendly	(Philippines) Manila	(Philippines) Stallions	3:1	Guam	Unknown	
18 July 2012	2013 EAFF East Asian Cup preliminary round	(Guam) Yona	Guam	3:1	Northern Mariana Islands	Jason Cunliffe 44', 68', 90' (pen.)	
22 July 2012	2013 EAFF East Asian Cup preliminary round	(Guam) Yona	Guam	3:0	Macau	Jason Cunliffe 15'; Marcus Lopez 22'; Zachary DeVille 90+3'	
25 September 2012	2012 Paulino Alcántara Cup	(Philippines) Manila	Philippines	1:0	Guam		
27 September 2012	2012 Paulino Alcántara Cup	(Philippines) Manila	Chinese Taipei	2:0	Guam		
29 September 2012	2012 Paulino Alcántara Cup	(Philippines) Manila	Macau	0:3	Guam	Marcus Lopez 45', 56'; Dylan Naputi 90'	
1 December 2012	2013 EAFF East Asian Cup Semi-final round	Hong Kong	Hong Kong	2:1	Guam	Elias Merfalen 56'	
3 December 2012	2013 EAFF East Asian Cup Semi-final round	Hong Kong	North Korea	5:0	Guam		
5 December 2012	2013 EAFF East Asian Cup Semi-final round	Hong Kong	Chinese Taipei	1:1	Guam	Dylan Naputi 67'	
7 December 2012	2013 EAFF East Asian Cup Semi-final round	Hong Kong	Guam	0:9	Australia		
2 March 2013	2014 AFC Challenge Cup qualification	(Myanmar) Yangon	Myanmar	5:0	Guam		
4 March 2013<	2014 AFC Challenge Cup qualification	(Myanmar) Yangon	Guam	0:4	India		
6 March 2013	2014 AFC Challenge Cup qualification	(Myanmar) Yangon	Chinese Taipei	0:3	Guam	Jason Cunliffe 15', 78'; Ian Mariano 54'	
16 November 2013	Friendly	(Laos) Vientiane	Laos	1:1	Guam	Jason Cunliffe 90' (pen.)	
19 November 2013	Friendly	(Cambodia) Phnom Penh	Cambodia	0:2	Guam	Ryan Guy 18'; Jason Cunliffe 68'	
27 March 2014	Friendly	(Aruba) Oranjestad	Aruba	2:2	Guam	Jason Cunliffe 65' (pen.), 77'	
30 March 2014	Friendly	(Aruba) Oranjestad	Aruba	2:0	Guam		
11 June 2015	2018 FIFA World Cup (AFC) and 2019 AFC Asian Cup qualification	(Guam) Dededo	Guam	1:0	Turkmenistan	Serdar Annaorazow 14' (o.g.)	
16 June 2015	2018 FIFA World Cup (AFC) and 2019 AFC Asian Cup qualification	(Guam) Dededo	Guam	2:1	India	Brandon McDonald 37'; Travis Nicklaw 62'	
3 September 2015	2018 FIFA World Cup (AFC) and 2019 AFC Asian Cup qualification	(Iran) Tehran	Iran	6:0	Guam		
8 September 2015	2018 FIFA World Cup (AFC) and 2019 AFC Asian Cup qualification	(Guam) Dededo	Guam	0:0	Oman		
13 October 2015	2018 FIFA World Cup (AFC) and 2019 AFC Asian Cup qualification	(Turkmenistan) Ashgabat	Turkmenistan	1:0	Guam		
12 November 2015	2018 FIFA World Cup (AFC) and 2019 AFC Asian Cup qualification	(India) Bangalore	India	1:0	Guam		
17 November 2015	2018 FIFA World Cup (AFC) and 2019 AFC Asian Cup qualification	(Guam) Dededo	Guam	0:6	Iran		
19 March 2016	Friendly	(Chinese Taipei) Taipei	Chinese Taipei	3:2	Guam	Justin Lee 34'; Shane Malcolm 44'	
24 March 2016	2018 FIFA World Cup (AFC) and 2019 AFC Asian Cup qualification	(Oman) Muscat	Oman	1:0	Guam		
6 November 2016	2017 EAFF Championship Second preliminary round	Hong Kong	Hong Kong	3:2	Guam	Jason Cunliffe 74'; Shane Malcolm 81'	
9 November 2016	2017 EAFF Championship Second preliminary round	Hong Kong	Guam	0:2	North Korea		
12 November 2016	2017 EAFF Championship Second preliminary round	Hong Kong	Chinese Taipei	2:0	Guam		
2 September 2018	2019 EAFF Championship First preliminary round	(Mongolia) Ulaanbaatar	Guam	4:0	Northern Mariana Islands	Devan Mendiola 13'; Marcus Lopez 26', 68'; Jason Cunliffe 65'	
4 September 2018	2019 EAFF Championship First preliminary round	(Mongolia) Ulaanbaatar	Macau	2:0	Guam		
6 September 2018	2019 EAFF Championship First preliminary round	(Mongolia) Ulaanbaatar	Mongolia	1:1	Guam	Devan Mendiola 89'	
6 June 2019	2022 World Cup qualification AFC first round	(Bhutan) Thimphu	Bhutan	1:0	Guam		
11 June 2019	2022 World Cup qualification AFC first round	(Guam) Dededo	Guam	5:0	Bhutan	Isiah Lagutang 23'; Jason Cunliffe 27', 82', 90+4'; Shane Malcolm 51'	
5 September 2019	2022 World Cup qualification AFC second round	(Guam) Dededo	Guam	0:1	Maldives		
10 September 2019	2022 World Cup qualification AFC second round	(Guam) Dededo	Guam	1:4	Philippines	Marcus Lopez 67' (pen.)	
10 October 2019	2022 World Cup qualification AFC second round	(China) Guangzhou	China	7:0	Guam		
15 October 2019	2022 World Cup qualification AFC second round	(United Arab Emirates) Dubai	Syria	4:0	Guam		
19 November 2019	2022 World Cup qualification AFC second round	(Maldives) Malé	Maldives	3:1	Guam	John Matkin 49'	
30 May 2021	2022 World Cup qualification AFC second round	(China) Suzhou	Guam	0:7	China		
7 June 2021	2022 World Cup qualification AFC second round	(United Arab Emirates) Sharjah	Guam	0:3	Syria		
11 June 2021	2022 World Cup qualification AFC second round	(United Arab Emirates) Sharjah	Philippines	3:0	Guam		
9 October 2021	2023 Asian Cup qualification play-off round	(Bahrain) Isa Town	Guam	0:1	Cambodia		
12 October 2021	2023 Asian Cup qualification play-off round	(Bahrain) Isa Town	Cambodia	2:1	Guam	Devan Mendiola 36'	
19 February 2022	Friendly	(Guam) Hagåtña	Guam	2:0	Northern Mariana Islands	Ryan Quitugua; Devan Mendiola	
22 February 2022	Friendly	(Guam) Hagåtña	Guam	3:2	Northern Mariana Islands	Jason Cunliffe 40', 60', 72'	
12 October 2023	2026 World Cup Qualifiers First round	(Singapore) Kallang	Guam	1:2	Singapore	Jason Cunliffe 90'	
17 October 2023	2026 World Cup Qualifiers First round	(Guam) Dededo	Guam	0:1	Singapore		
6 April 2024	Friendly	(Northern Mariana Islands) Saipan	Guam	2:2	Northern Mariana Islands	Manibusan 48'; Stenson 60'	
7 April 2024	Friendly	(Northern Mariana Islands) Saipan	Guam	1:2	Northern Mariana Islands	Harmon 74'	

Indicates unofficial matches.
