= 2016–17 Guam Soccer League =

Guam Soccer League
- Season: 2016–2017
- Highest scoring: Guam Shipyard 17–2 Haya United (19 goals)

The 2016–17 Guam Soccer League (Budweiser Soccer League for sponsorship reasons) is the 28th season of Guam Soccer League, Guam's First tier professional football league. Rovers are the defending champions.

== Changes from last season ==
=== Team changes ===
The following teams had changed division since the 2016 season.

==== To Guam Soccer League ====
Promoted from 2015-16 Guam Second Division

- None

New clubs

- Haya United

==== From Guam Soccer League ====
Relegated to 2016-17 Guam Second Division

- Sidekicks
- Southern Cobras

== Date and Venue ==
All matches were held in GFA Center Lower Field, Harmon from 8 October 2016 to 25 April 2017.

== League table ==
Pos	Team	Pld	W	D	L	GF	GA	GD	Pts	Qualification
1	Rovers	16	13	0	3	87	25	+62	39	Qualification to 2018 AFC Cup
2	Guam Shipyard	16	12	0	4	86	27	+59	36	
3	Quality Distributors	16	7	1	8	42	45	−3	22	
4	BOG Strykers	16	5	1	10	47	64	−17	16	
5	Haya United	16	2	0	14	24	125	−101	6	

Updated to match(es) played on 29 April 2017. Source:
Rules for classification: 1) Points; 2) Goal difference; 3) Goals scored; 4) Head-to-head points; 5) Head-to-head goal difference; 6) Head-to-head goal scored; 7) Head-to-head away goal scored

== Results ==
Home \ Away	BOG	GSY	HYA	ROV	QLT	BOG	GSY	HYA	ROV	QLT
BOG Strykers		2–3	2–3	0–8	6–5		1–4	5–6	0–10	1–3
Guam Shipyard	5–0		17–2	1–5	1–2	5–2		10–1	1–2	3–1
Haya United	0–11	1–7		2–8	0–8	2–4	0–15		2–9	3–6
Rovers	5–1	2–4	7–0		5–1	2–6	3–2	10–1		3–1
Quality Distributors	3–3	2–4	3–1	3–2		0–3	1–4	3–0	0–6	

Updated to match(es) played on 29 April 2017. Source:
Legend: Blue = home team win; Yellow = draw; Red = away team win.

== Season statistics ==
As of 8 April 2017

=== Top scorers ===
Rank	Player	Club	Goals
1	(Guam) Min Sung Choi	Guam Shipyard	25
2	(Guam) Ashton Surber	Rovers	23
3	(Guam) Clayton Mitchell	BOG Strykers	14
4	(Guam) Marcus Lopez	Rovers	12
4	(Guam) Scott Spindel	BOG Strykers	12
6	(Guam) Ian Mariano	Rovers	10
6	(Guam) Seth Surber	Haya United	10
6	(Guam) Mark Chagualaf	Guam Shipyard	10
9	(Guam) Antonio Prieto	Quality Distributors	9
10	(Guam) Jeremy Boldt	Quality Distributors	8
10	(Guam) Donald Wealey	Guam Shipyard	8

== End of season ==
Rovers continue winning the league and qualified to AFC Cup. While, Haya United finished at the bottom with only 2 wins and 125 conceded goals.

=== Season awards ===
==== Golden Boot ====
(Guam) Min Sung Choi (Rovers)

==== Golden Gloves ====
(Guam) David Drews (Rovers)

==== Fair-play ====
Haya United
