= Jason Cunliffe =

Guamanian soccer player

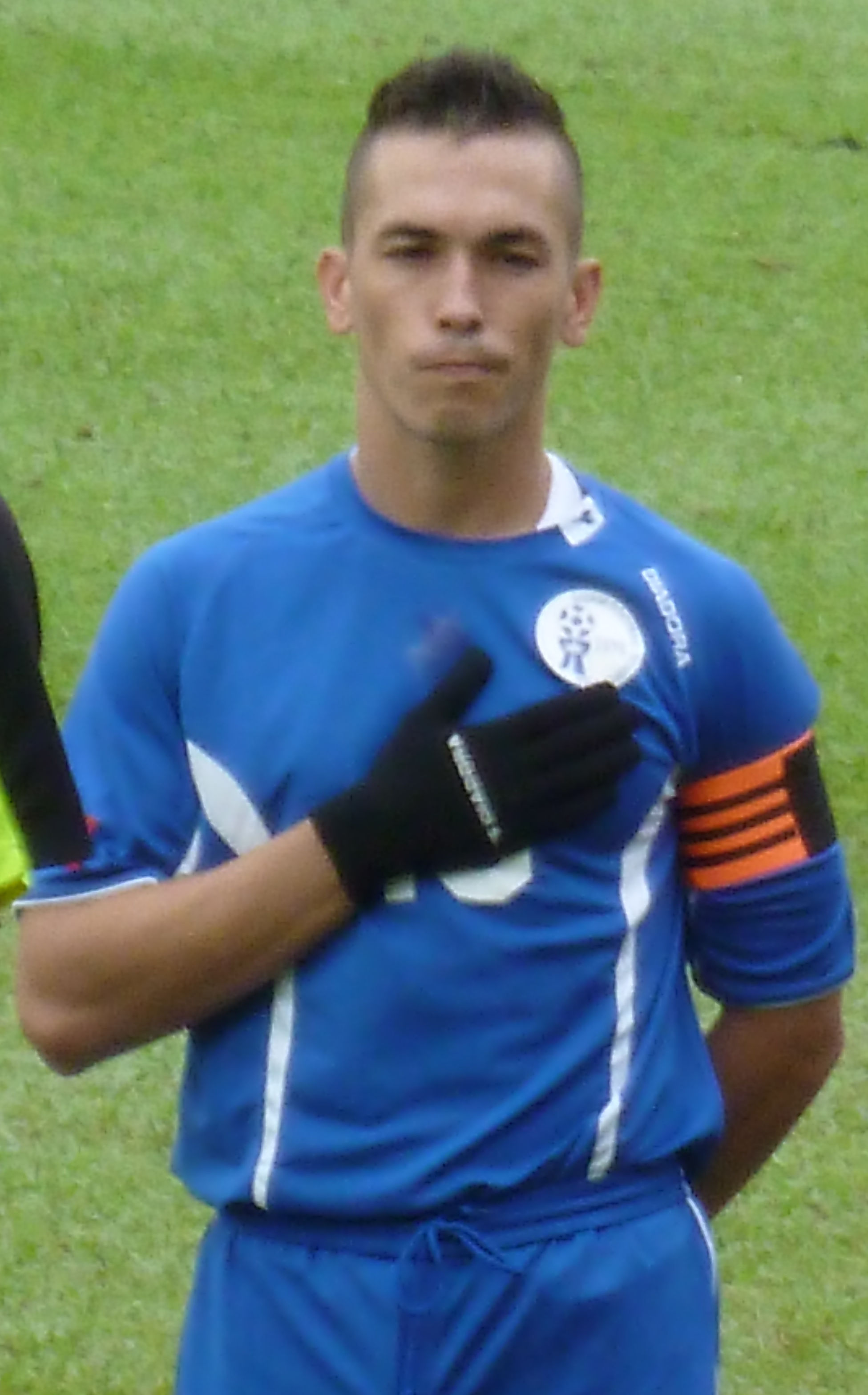
- Cunliffe lining up for Guam in 2012.

Personal information
- Full name: Jason Ryan Quitugua Cunliffe
- Date of birth: October 23, 1983 (age 43)
- Place of birth: Hagåtña, Guam
- Height: 1.79 m (5 ft 10 in)
- Positions: Striker; midfielder

Team information
- Current team: Arizona

Youth career
- Tumon Soccer Club
- Houston Texans

College career
Years	Team	Apps	(Gls)
2001–2004	Santa Clara Broncos	55	(7)

Senior career*
Years	Team	Apps	(Gls)
2006–2008	Quality Distributors	49	(38)
2010–2012	Guam Shipyard	55	(52)
2012–2013	Pachanga Diliman	13	(4)
2013–2018	Rovers	36	(43)
2017–2018	→ Isla de Ladrones (loan)		
2018–2024	Bank of Guam Strykers	28	(19)
2025–	Arizona		

International career^{‡}
2006–	Guam	74	(26)
- * Club domestic league appearances and goals as of January 31, 2024 (UTC) ‡ National team caps and goals as of June 6, 2026

Jason Ryan Quitugua Cunliffe (born October 23, 1983) is a Guamanian soccer player who plays as a striker and midfielder for National Premier Soccer League club FC Arizona, and captains the Guamanian national team. He is the record holder in terms of both appearances and goals for the Guam national team.

== Youth and club career ==
Cunliffe first played for Guam’s Tumon Soccer Club at the age of five. He was part of the Houston Texans team that won two youth national championships in 2001 and 2002, and was part of the 2001 Texans team that won the Brazil Cup. Cunliffe played for the NCAA Division I men’s soccer team, the Santa Clara University Broncos, including playing for its 2003 team that competed in the NCAA Final Four.

From 2010 to 2012, he played for Guam Shipyard in the Guam Men's Soccer League. In 2012, he signed for Philippine side Pachanga in the United Football League.

After his stint with the Philippine club, Cunliffe returned home to Guam to join Rovers FC. He played for the Rovers from 2013 to 2018, including the 2017 AFC Cup playoff qualifiers. He then moved to Bank of Guam Strykers FC and played for them at the 2018 Guam FA Cup.

== International career ==
He first represented Guam at youth level for its under-16 national team. He made his senior debut in the 2006 AFC Challenge Cup, with his first match as a starting player on 3 April 2006 against the host nation, Bangladesh. Since 2006, Cunliffe has become a mainstay in the national team and has been captain since 2012.

He made his first hat-trick for Guam in the 2013 EAFF East Asian Cup match against the Northern Mariana Islands, which helped them to win 3–1. He scored another hat trick against Bhutan in a 2022 World Cup qualifier on 11 June 2019, which ended 5–0 for Guam.

He made his 50th international cap on September 4, 2018, in Guam's match against Macau at the 2019 EAFF Football Championship. He is the first Guam national team player to achieve the said feat.

== Career statistics ==
=== International goals ===
Scores and results list Guam's goal tally first.

List of international goals scored by Jason Cunliffe
No.	Date	Venue	Opponent	Score	Result	Competition
1.	March 15, 2009	Leo Palace Resort Soccer Ground, Yona, Guam	Macau	2–2	2–2	2010 East Asian Football Championship
2.	August 23, 2009	National Stadium, Kaohsiung, Taiwan	North Korea	2–2	2–9	2010 East Asian Football Championship
3.	June 19, 2010	Oleai Sports Complex, Saipan, Northern Mariana Islands	Northern Mariana Islands	1–1	1–1	Friendly
4.	September 3, 2011	Stade Rivière Salée, Nouméa, New Caledonia	Vanuatu	1–0	1–4	2011 Pacific Games
5.	September 5, 2011	Stade Rivière Salée, Nouméa, New Caledonia	Tuvalu	1–0	1–1	2011 Pacific Games
6.	July 18, 2012	Leo Palace Resort Soccer Ground, Yona, Guam	Northern Mariana Islands	1–1	3–1	2013 EAFF East Asian Cup
7.	July 18, 2012	Leo Palace Resort Soccer Ground, Yona, Guam	Northern Mariana Islands	2–1	3–1	2013 EAFF East Asian Cup
8.	July 18, 2012	Leo Palace Resort Soccer Ground, Yona, Guam	Northern Mariana Islands	3–1	3–1	2013 EAFF East Asian Cup
9.	July 22, 2012	Leo Palace Resort Soccer Ground, Yona, Guam	Macau	1–0	3–0	2013 EAFF East Asian Cup
10.	March 6, 2013	Thuwunna Stadium, Yangon, Burma	Chinese Taipei	1–0	3–0	2014 AFC Challenge Cup
11.	March 6, 2013	Thuwunna Stadium, Yangon, Burma	Chinese Taipei	3–0	3–0	2014 AFC Challenge Cup
12.	November 16, 2013	New Laos National Stadium, Vientiane, Laos	Laos	1–1	1–1	Friendly
13.	March 27, 2014	Trinidad Stadium, Oranjestad, Aruba	Aruba	1–1	2–2	Friendly
14.	March 27, 2014	Trinidad Stadium, Oranjestad, Aruba	Aruba	2–1	2–2	Friendly
15.	November 13, 2014	Taipei Municipal Stadium, Taipei, Taiwan	Chinese Taipei	1–0	2–1	2015 EAFF East Asian Cup
16.	November 16, 2014	Taipei Municipal Stadium, Taipei, Taiwan	North Korea	1–1	1–4	2015 EAFF East Asian Cup
17.	March 31, 2015	Jalan Besar Stadium, Jalan Besar, Singapore	Singapore	2–1	2–2	Friendly
18.	November 6, 2016	Mong Kok Stadium, Mong Kok, Hong Kong	Hong Kong	1–3	2–3	2017 EAFF East Asian Cup
19.	September 2, 2018	MFF Football Centre, Ulaanbaatar, Mongolia	Northern Mariana Islands	3–0	4–0	2019 EAFF E-1 Football Championship
20.	June 11, 2019	Guam FA National Training Center, Dededo, Guam	Bhutan	2–0	5–0	2022 FIFA World Cup qualification
21.	June 11, 2019	Guam FA National Training Center, Dededo, Guam	Bhutan	4–0	5–0	2022 FIFA World Cup qualification
22.	June 11, 2019	Guam FA National Training Center, Dededo, Guam	Bhutan	5–0	5–0	2022 FIFA World Cup qualification
23.	February 22, 2022	Guam National Football Stadium, Hagåtña, Guam	Northern Mariana Islands	1–1	3–2	Friendly
24.	February 22, 2022	Guam National Football Stadium, Hagåtña, Guam	Northern Mariana Islands	2–2	3–2	Friendly
25.	February 22, 2022	Guam National Football Stadium, Hagåtña, Guam	Northern Mariana Islands	3–2	3–2	Friendly
26.	October 12, 2023	National Stadium, Kallang, Singapore	Singapore	1–2	1–2	2026 FIFA World Cup qualification
