= 2019–20 Guam Soccer League =

Guam Soccer League
- Season: 2019–20

The 2019–20 Guam Soccer League (also known as the Budweiser Soccer League for sponsorship reasons) is the 31st season of Guam Soccer League, Guam's first-tier professional soccer league.

The season started on 19 October 2019 and was suspended in March 2020 due to the COVID-19 pandemic.

== Teams ==
A total of nine teams competed in the league with UOG Tritons joining the league. NAPA Rovers were the defending champions.

Location football club of Guam Soccer League
- BOG Strykers
- Islanders
- LOA Heat
- NAPA Rovers
- Quality Distributors
- Guam Shipyard
- Sidekicks
- Manhoben Lalåhi
- UOG Tritons

== League table ==
| Pos | Team | Pld | W | D | L | GF | GA | GD | Pts |
|---|---|---|---|---|---|---|---|---|---|
| 1 | NAPA Rovers | 13 | 11 | 1 | 1 | 83 | 14 | +69 | 34 |
| 2 | BOG Strykers | 12 | 11 | 1 | 0 | 72 | 8 | +64 | 34 |
| 3 | Islanders | 14 | 9 | 0 | 5 | 68 | 39 | +29 | 27 |
| 4 | Manhoben Lalåhi | 14 | 8 | 1 | 5 | 70 | 35 | +35 | 25 |
| 5 | Quality Distributors | 13 | 5 | 2 | 6 | 30 | 38 | −8 | 17 |
| 6 | LOA Heat | 14 | 5 | 1 | 8 | 50 | 52 | −2 | 16 |
| 7 | Guam Shipyard | 13 | 3 | 0 | 10 | 17 | 83 | −66 | 9 |
| 8 | UOG Tritons | 14 | 2 | 2 | 10 | 17 | 93 | −76 | 8 |
| 9 | Sidekicks | 13 | 2 | 0 | 11 | 11 | 56 | −45 | 6 |

Updated to match(es) played on 10 September 2020. Source: Soccerway, RSSSF
Rules for classification: 1) Points; 2) Goal difference; 3) Goals scored.
