= 2017–18 Guam Soccer League =

Guam Soccer League
- Season: 2017–2018

The 2017–18 Guam Soccer League (Budweiser Soccer League for sponsorship reasons) was the 29th season of the Guam Soccer League, Guam's First tier professional football league. Rovers are the defending champions. The season started on 15 September 2017.

== Regular season ==
| Pos | Team | Pld | W | D | L | GF | GA | GD | Pts | Qualification |
|---|---|---|---|---|---|---|---|---|---|---|
| 1 | Isla De Ladrones | 16 | 16 | 0 | 0 | 110 | 16 | +94 | 48 | Play-off stage |
| 2 | NAPA Rovers | 16 | 15 | 0 | 1 | 124 | 18 | +106 | 45 | Play-off stage |
| 3 | UOG Tritons | 15 | 12 | 1 | 2 | 65 | 21 | +44 | 37 | Play-off stage |
| 4 | Islanders | 16 | 12 | 0 | 4 | 91 | 20 | +71 | 36 | Play-off stage |
| 5 | BOG Strykers | 15 | 11 | 0 | 4 | 115 | 24 | +91 | 33 | Play-off stage |
| 6 | Anderson Bombers | 16 | 10 | 1 | 5 | 51 | 22 | +29 | 31 | Play-off stage |
| 7 | BOG B | 16 | 9 | 2 | 5 | 55 | 42 | +13 | 29 | Play-off stage |
| 8 | LOA Heat | 16 | 9 | 1 | 6 | 53 | 45 | +8 | 28 | Play-off stage |
| 9 | Familia | 16 | 6 | 2 | 8 | 42 | 65 | −23 | 20 | |
| 10 | Eurocar | 16 | 6 | 1 | 9 | 46 | 53 | −7 | 19 | |
| 11 | Quality Distributors | 16 | 6 | 1 | 9 | 29 | 45 | −16 | 19 | |
| 12 | Shipyard Haya | 16 | 4 | 1 | 11 | 41 | 90 | −49 | 13 | |
| 13 | Sidekicks | 16 | 3 | 1 | 12 | 20 | 40 | −20 | 10 | |
| 14 | Beercelona | 16 | 3 | 0 | 13 | 20 | 94 | −74 | 9 | |
| 15 | Crushers | 16 | 3 | 0 | 13 | 14 | 114 | −100 | 9 | |
| 16 | Bobcat Rovers | 16 | 2 | 0 | 14 | 14 | 85 | −71 | 6 | |
| 17 | Pago Bay Disasters | 16 | 1 | 1 | 14 | 17 | 119 | −102 | 4 | |

Source: Soccerway FIFA
Rules for classification: 1) Points; 2) Goal difference; 3) Goals scored; 4) Head-to-head points; 5) Head-to-head goal difference; 6) Head-to-head goal scored; 7) Head-to-head away goal scored

== Playoff stage ==
The top eight teams of the regular season qualify for the playoff stage.

Quarter-finals
18 May
Isla De Ladrones | 5
LOA Heat | 6
12 May
Islanders | 1
BOG Strykers | 3
11 May
UOG Tritons (a.e.t.) | 3
Anderson Bombers | 2
12 May
NAPA Rovers | 7
BOG B | 1

Semi-finals
23 May
LOA Heat | 4
BOG Strykers | 3
18 May
UOG Tritons | 1
NAPA Rovers | 3

Final
27 May
LOA Heat | 3
NAPA Rovers | 4

== See also ==
- 2018 Guam FA Cup
