= 2018–19 Guam Soccer League =

Guam soccer league season

Guam Soccer League
- Season: 2018–19
- Champions: NAPA Rovers

The 2018–19 Guam Soccer League (Budweiser Soccer League for sponsorship reasons) is the 30th season of Guam Soccer League, Guam's first-tier professional soccer league.

The season started on 13 October 2018, and concluded on 27 April 2019, with each team playing 21 matches.

== Teams ==
A total of eight teams competed in the league, reduced from the previous season of 17 teams. NAPA Rovers were the defending champions. Guam U-19 (also known as Manhoben Lalåhi) entered this season.

- BOG Strykers
- Islanders
- LOA Heat
- NAPA Rovers
- Quality Distributors
- Guam Shipyard
- Sidekicks
- Guam U-19

== League table ==
Pos	Team	Pld	W	D	L	GF	GA	GD	Pts
1	NAPA Rovers (C)	21	19	2	0	130	27	+103	59
2	BOG Strykers	21	16	2	3	106	37	+69	50
3	Guam U-19	21	13	3	5	78	43	+35	42
4	Islanders	21	8	1	12	51	56	−5	25
5	LOA Heat	21	7	3	11	48	86	−38	24
6	Quality Distributors	21	6	1	14	37	90	−53	19
7	Sidekicks	21	5	3	13	26	54	−28	18
8	Guam Shipyard	21	2	1	18	32	115	−83	7

Source: Guam FA, RSSSF
Rules for classification: 1) Points; 2) Goal difference; 3) Goals scored.
(C) Champions

== See also ==
- 2019 Guam FA Cup
