= Jan-Willem Staman =

Guamanian footballer

Personal information
- Full name: Jan-Willem Staman
- Date of birth: 9 January 1984 (age 42)
- Place of birth: Nijverdal, Netherlands
- Height: 1.83 m (6 ft 0 in)
- Position: Midfielder

Team information
- Current team: Rovers
- Number: 14

Youth career
- Twente

Senior career*
Years	Team	Apps	(Gls)
2001–2008	v.v. DES	148	(52)
2011–2013	Strykers	56	(87)
2013–2016	Quality Distributors		
2016–	Rovers		

International career
2015–	Guam	4	(0)
- * Club domestic league appearances and goals

Jan-Willem Staman (born 9 January 1984) is a footballer who plays for Rovers in the Guam Men's Soccer League. Born in the Netherland, he has represented the Guam national team.

== Career ==
=== Early career ===
Staman briefly played for the youth team of Twente.

=== VV DES ===
In 1990, Staman joined a local amateur club in his hometown of Nijverdal called VV DES. He made his debut for the club in August 2001 at the age of 17.

=== Guam ===
In 2011, Staman joined a local amateur club in the Guam Men's Soccer League called Strykers. He switched clubs in 2013 and joined the Quality Distributors.

== International career ==
Staman received his first call up for the Guam national football team in March 2015 for the friendly matches against Hong Kong and Singapore. He made his debut by coming on at half time in the Hong Kong friendly. Staman made his second appearance in the friendly match against Singapore coming on the 84th minute.

Staman was called up for the 2018 FIFA World Cup qualification matches against Turkmenistan and India. Staman started his first match later during the qualification against Oman.

== Personal life ==
Staman moved to the island of Guam in 2011. He is married to an American woman named Marylou. He currently works full-time at an aquarium and is a part-time dive instructor.
