= 2007 Guam Men's Soccer League =

Guam Men's Soccer League
- Season: 2007
- Champions: Quality Distributors

Statistics of Guam League for the 2007 season.

== League standings ==
Pos	Team	Pld	W	D	L	GF	GA	GD	Pts
1	Quality Distributors	9	6	1	2	24	17	+7	19
2	Guam Shipyard	9	5	1	3	53	13	+40	16
3	U19 National Team	9	4	2	3	38	21	+17	14
4	Team No Ka Oi	9	1	0	8	7	71	−64	3

Source: rsssf.com
