= Min Sung Choi =

Guamanian footballer (born 1992)

Min-sung Choi
Personal information
- Full name: Min-sung Choi
- Date of birth: October 16, 1992 (age 34)
- Place of birth: Hagatna, Guam
- Height: 1.73 m (5 ft 8 in)
- Position: Forward

Team information
- Current team: Strykers
- Number: 10

Youth career
- 2006–2010: St. Paul Christian School

Senior career*
Years	Team	Apps	(Gls)
2008–2015	Strykers	88	(77)
2015-2017	Guam Shipyard	45	(73)
2017–2022	Rovers	122	(61)
2022–	Strykers	30	(12)

International career
2015–	Guam	2	(0)
- * Club domestic league appearances and goals

Min-sung Choi (born 16 October 1992) is a Guamanian professional footballer who plays for Strykers in the Guam Men's Soccer League.

== Club career ==
Choi was the Guam Men's Soccer League top scorer in the 2008–2009 season with 35 goals and joint top scorer in the 2009–2010 season with 28 goals.

== International career ==
Choi was called up for the Guam national football team in March 2015 for the friendlies against Hong Kong national football team and Singapore national football team.
