= 2013–14 Guam Men's Soccer League =

Guam Men's Soccer League
- Season: 2013–14

2013–14 Guam Men's Soccer League, officially named Budweiser Guam Men's Soccer League due to sponsorship reason, is the association football league of Guam.

Pos	Team	Pld	W	D	L	GF	GA	GD	Pts	Qualification
1	Rovers FC	20	16	0	4	110	23	+87	48	2015 AFC Cup
2	Guam Shipyard	20	11	5	4	75	44	+31	38	
3	Quality Distributors	20	10	3	7	57	63	−6	33	
4	Espada	20	8	3	9	61	54	+7	27	
5	Southern Cobras	20	7	2	11	68	88	−20	23	
6	Paintco Strykers	20	0	3	17	20	119	−99	3	

Source: rsssf.com
