= 2014–15 Guam Soccer League =

Guam Soccer League
- Season: 2014–15
- Champions: Rovers FC

2014–15 Guam Soccer League, officially named Budweiser Guam Soccer League due to sponsorship reason, is the association football league of Guam.

Pos	Team	Pld	W	D	L	GF	GA	GD	Pts	Qualification
1	Rovers FC	18	14	2	2	125	34	+91	44	2015 AFC Cup
2	Strykers FC	18	14	2	2	90	25	+65	44	
3	Quality Distributors	18	9	1	8	59	58	+1	28	
4	Guam Shipyard	18	8	2	8	61	38	+23	26	
5	Southern Cobras	18	6	2	10	75	61	+14	20	
6	Sidekicks FC	18	4	4	10	42	68	−26	16	
7	Doosan FC	18	1	1	16	15	183	−168	4	

Source: rsssf.com
