= 2017 Guam FA Cup =

Tournament details
- Country: Guam

Final positions
- Champions: Guam Shipyard
- Runners-up: NAPA Rovers

The 2017 Guam FA Cup is the 10th season of the Guam FA Cup knockout tournament.

The draw of the tournament was held on 1 April 2017.

== Qualifying round ==
Match	Date	Day	Time	Team 1	Score	Team 2	Field
1	4/25	TUES	7:00	Sidekicks SC	1:7	BOG Strykers	UA-2
2	4/26	WED	7:00	FC Beercelona	13:0	Big Blue	UA-2
3	4/27	THUR	7:00	BOG Strykers Masters	5:1	United Masters	UA-2
4	4/27	THUR	9:00	Hyundai Family FC	3:0	Pago Bay Disasters	UA-2
5	4/28	FRI	7:00	Gino’s FC	2:1	IT&E Boonie Dawgs	UA-2
6	4/28	FRI	9:00	NAPA Rovers Masters	0:3	Shinko EuroCar	UA-2
7	4/29	SAT	7:00	Bobcat Rovers	BYE		UA-2
8	4/29	SAT	9:00	Lots of Art Heat	6:2	Crushers FC	UA-2

== Round of 16 ==
Match	Date	Day	Time	Team 1	Score	Team 2	Field
9	5/2	TUES	7:00	BOG Strykers	1:9	NAPA Rovers D1	UA-2
10	5/3	WED	7:00	FC Beercelona	0:7	NAPA Rovers D2	UA-2
11	5/4	THUR	7:00	BOG Strykers Masters	0:10	BOG Strykers D1	UA-2
12	5/4	THUR	9:00	Hyundai Family FC	0:11	UOG Tritons	UA-2
13	5/5	FRI	7:00	Gino’s FC	0:13	Guam Shipyard	UA-2
14	5/5	FRI	9:00	Shinko EuroCar	0:1	Islanders FC	UA-2
15	5/6	SAT	7:00	Bobcat Rovers	0:1	Quality Distributors	UA-2
16	5/6	SAT	9:00	Lots of Art Heat	1:3	Haya United	UA-2

== Quarter-finals ==
Match	Date	Day	Time	Team 1	Score	Team 2	Field
17	5/12	FRI	7:00	NAPA Rovers D1	5:0	NAPA Rovers D2	UA-2
18	5/12	FRI	9:00	BOG Strykers D1	3:1	UOG Tritons	UA-2
19	5/13	SAT	7:00	Guam Shipyard	9:2	Islanders FC	UA-2
20	5/13	SAT	9:00	Quality Distributors	8:1	Haya United	UA-2

== Semi-finals ==
Match	Date	Day	Time	Team 1	Score	Team 2	Field
21	5/19	FRI	7:00	NAPA Rovers D1	5:0	BOG Strykers D1	UA-2
22	5/19	FRI	7:00	Guam Shipyard	4:3	Quality Distributors	UA-1

== Final ==
28 May 2017
19:00 UTC+10

NAPA Rovers	1–4	Guam Shipyard
	Report

Guam Football Association National Training Center, Dededo
Referee: Steven Higa

== See also ==
- 2016–17 Guam Soccer League
