= 2008–09 Guam Men's Soccer League =

Guam Men's Soccer League
- Season: 2008–09
- Champions: Quality Distributors

The final standings in the Guam Men's Soccer League for the 2008–09 season are below. Quality Distributors were Division One champions for the third season in a row, finishing with a record of 15–1–4. Second place were Paintco Strykers (14–2–4), who set a record for most goals scored in D1 play, with 18 goals against fifth place Wild Bill's II.

== Final standings ==
Pos	Team	Pld	W	D	L	GF	GA	GD	Pts
1	Quality Distributors	20	15	4	1	88	16	+72	49
2	Paintco Strykers	20	14	4	2	109	41	+68	46
3	Bank of Guam Crushers	20	9	2	9	53	47	+6	29
4	Guam Shipyard	20	8	2	10	44	44	0	26
5	Wild Bill's II	20	5	1	14	43	103	−60	16
6	No Ka Oi	20	2	1	17	32	118	−86	7

Source: rsssf.com
