= Football in Guam =

- Country: Guam
- Governing body: Guam Football Association
- National team: men's national team

Club competitions
- Guam Soccer League

International competitions
- AFC Challenge League; Marianas Club Championship; EAFF E-1 Football Championship; AFC Asian Cup; FIFA World Cup (men's)

The sport of association football in the United States territory of Guam is run by the Guam Football Association. The association administers the national football team, as well as the Guam Soccer League.

== League system ==
Level	League(s)/Division(s)
1	Guam Soccer League; 17 clubs

== Football stadiums in Guam ==
Stadium	Capacity	City
Guam National Football Stadium	1,000	Hagåtña

== See also ==
- Guam national futsal team
- Guam women's national football team
