= Anthony Moon (footballer) =

Guamanian footballer (born 2001)

Personal information
- Date of birth: 14 October 2001 (age 25)
- Place of birth: Guam
- Position: Midfielder

Team information
- Current team: Red Wings

Senior career*
Years	Team	Apps	(Gls)
–2020	Manhoben Lalåhi		
2021–	Red Wings		

International career^{‡}
2021–	Guam	1	(0)
- * Club domestic league appearances and goals as of 13:46, 11 October 2021 (UTC) ‡ National team caps and goals as of 13:46, 11 October 2021 (UTC)

Anthony Moon (born 14 October 2001) is a Guamanian footballer who plays as a midfielder for Red Wings and the Guam national football team.

== Club career ==
As a youth Moon played for Wings FC, Strykers FC, and Tigers FC. Through the 2019–20 Guam Soccer League season he played for Manhoben Lalåhi.

== International career ==
In December 2013 Moon was part of the national U12 squad that traveled to the Northern Marianas Islands for a friendly competition with academies from Saipan. It was one of the youngest groups from Guam ever taken abroad for international competition. He was later part of the Guam U14 side and competed in the Boys Festival of Football at the National Training Center in Xianghe, China. The tournament included teams from all eleven members of the EAFF. In 2019 he was part of Guam's combined U19/U23 squad which competed in the Marianas Cup.

In May 2021 Moon was called up to the senior squad for a 2022 FIFA World Cup qualification match against China. He went on to make his senior international debut in the eventual 0–7 defeat on 30 May 2021.

=== International career statistics ===
As of match played 30 May 2021

Guam national team
Year	Apps	Goals
2021	1	0
Total	1	0
