= 2006 Guam Men's Soccer League =

Guam Men's Soccer League
- Season: 2006
- Champions: Guam Shipyard

Statistics of Guam League for the 2006 season.

== Spring League ==
=== Group stage ===
| Pos | Team | Pld | W | D | L | GF | GA | GD | Pts |
|---|---|---|---|---|---|---|---|---|---|
| 1 | Guam Shipyard | 8 | 7 | 0 | 1 | 35 | 7 | +28 | 21 |
| 2 | Quality Distributors | 8 | 5 | 0 | 3 | 28 | 11 | +17 | 15 |
| 3 | Dodge Rams | 8 | 4 | 0 | 4 | 22 | 15 | +7 | 12 |
| 4 | Orange Crushers | 8 | 4 | 0 | 4 | 21 | 21 | 0 | 12 |
| 5 | Samurai Restaurant | 8 | 0 | 0 | 8 | 7 | 59 | −52 | 0 |

=== Semifinals ===
- Guam Shipyard 2-1 Orange Crushers
- Quality Distributors 4-2 Dodge Rams

=== Third-place match ===
- Orange Crushers 8-2 Dodge Rams

=== Final ===
- Guam Shipyard 6-1 Quality Distributors

== Fall League ==
| Pos | Team | Pld | W | D | L | GF | GA | GD | Pts |
|---|---|---|---|---|---|---|---|---|---|
| 1 | Guam Shipyard | 11 | 10 | 1 | 0 | 91 | 7 | +84 | 31 |
| 2 | U17 National Team | 11 | 9 | 1 | 1 | 93 | 10 | +83 | 28 |
| 3 | Quality Distributors | 11 | 7 | 3 | 1 | 40 | 10 | +30 | 24 |
| 4 | Team No Ka Oi | 11 | 7 | 2 | 2 | 54 | 41 | +13 | 23 |
| 5 | PaintCo Strykers | 11 | 5 | 1 | 5 | 34 | 46 | −12 | 16 |
| 6 | TakeCare Tigers | 11 | 5 | 1 | 5 | 29 | 44 | −15 | 16 |
| 7 | U15 National Team | 11 | 5 | 0 | 6 | 41 | 45 | −4 | 15 |
| 8 | Toyota 4Runners | 11 | 3 | 1 | 7 | 13 | 45 | −32 | 10 |
| 9 | CoreTech | 11 | 3 | 1 | 7 | 17 | 67 | −50 | 10 |
| 10 | Orange Crushers | 11 | 3 | 0 | 8 | 28 | 48 | −20 | 9 |
| 11 | Biohazard | 11 | 2 | 1 | 8 | 19 | 42 | −23 | 7 |
| 12 | Han Ma Um | 11 | 0 | 2 | 9 | 6 | 60 | −54 | 2 |

Source: rsssf.com
