= Devan Mendiola =

Guamanian footballer (born 1999)

Personal information
- Full name: Devan Jakob Camacho Mendiola
- Date of birth: 19 January 1999 (age 27)
- Place of birth: Tamuning, Guam
- Position: Midfielder

Team information
- Current team: Rovers
- Number: 16

Senior career*
Years	Team	Apps	(Gls)
2004–2010	Quality Distributors		
2010–2012	Cars Plus		
2012–	Table 35 Espada		

International career^{‡}
2019–	Guam	11	(2)
- * Club domestic league appearances and goals ‡ National team caps and goals as of 13 June 2021

Devan Jakob Camacho Mendiola is a Guamanian professional footballer who plays as a midfielder for GSL club Rovers and the Guam national team.

== International career ==
Mendiola appeared in 6 games for Guam and scored 2 goals, including 5 games in the 2022 FIFA World Cup qualification.

== International goals ==
No.	Date	Venue	Opponent	Score	Result	Competition
1.	2 September 2019	MFF Football Centre, Ulaanbaatar, Mongolia	Northern Mariana Islands	1–0	4–0	2019 EAFF E-1 Football Championship
2.	6 September 2019	MFF Football Centre, Ulaanbaatar, Mongolia	Mongolia	1–0	1–1	2019 EAFF E-1 Football Championship
3.	12 October 2021	Khalifa Sports City Stadium, Isa Town, Bahrain	Cambodia	1–0	1–2	2023 AFC Asian Cup qualification
