= Ross Awa =

Football coach from Guam

Personal information
- Date of birth: March 18, 1990 (age 36)
- Place of birth: Guam

Senior career*
Years	Team	Apps	(Gls)
- Strykers FC

Managerial career
- Strykers FC (Youth)
- 2014–2019: Guam (Team Manager)
- 2020–2022: Guam Women U20
- 2020–2022: Guam (Assistant Technical Director)
- 2022–2023: Guam Women's (Interim Coach)
- 2023–: Guam (Technical Director)
- 2023–: Guam
- 2025–: Guam Women (assistant)
- * Club domestic league appearances and goals

Ross Awa (born March 18, 1990) is a Guamanian football coach. He is the current head coach of the Guam national football team and the assistant coach of Guam women's national football team.

== Career ==
Awa has held various coaching roles with the Guam Football Association. He worked as team manager and head of the football school for the Guam national team from 2014 to 2019. He then served as Assistant Technical Director from 2020 to 2022 before taking over as interim head coach of the Guam women's national team in 2022–2023.

In 2023, Awa served as technical director for Guam and then being appointed head coach of the Guam men's national team in July 2023.
