= Isiah Lagutang =

Guamanian soccer player

Personal information
- Full name: Isiah Kazunori Kimura Lagutang
- Date of birth: August 3, 1997 (age 29)
- Place of birth: Tamuning, Guam
- Height: 1.73 m (5 ft 8 in)
- Position: Midfielder

Team information
- Current team: Bank of Guam Strykers FC
- Number: 7

Senior career*
Years	Team	Apps	(Gls)
2014–	Bank of Guam Strykers FC	10	(1)

International career^{‡}
2018–	Guam	11	(1)
- * Club domestic league appearances and goals ‡ National team caps and goals as of 13 June 2021

Isiah Kazunori Kimura Lagutang (born 3 August 1997) is a Guamanian international soccer player who plays for Bank of Guam Strykers FC in the Guam Men's Soccer League.

== International ==
Lagutang was called up for the Guam for the 2018 FIFA World Cup qualification matches against the Turkmenistan national football team and the India national football team.

He scored his first international goal on 11 June 2019 against Bhutan during the 2022 FIFA World Cup qualification at the Guam FA National Training Center.

=== International goals ===
Score and Result list Guam's goal tally first

#	Date	Venue	Opponent	Score	Result	Competition
1.	11 June 2019	Guam FA National Training Center, Dededo, Guam	Bhutan	1–0	5–0	2022 FIFA World Cup qualification
