= John Matkin =

Guamanian soccer player (born 1986)

Personal information
- Full name: John Landa Matkin
- Date of birth: April 20, 1986 (age 40)
- Place of birth: San Diego, California, United States
- Height: 1.80 m (5 ft 11 in)
- Position: Midfielder

College career
Years	Team	Apps	(Gls)
2004–2007	Southwestern Jaguars		
2007–2009	San Diego Toreros		

Senior career*
Years	Team	Apps	(Gls)
2009–2011	Halesowen Town	37	(12)
2011–2013	Grulla Morioka	67	(7)
2012–2013	United Sikkim	10	(2)
2014–2015	Pyunik	4	(0)
2015	Chaiyaphum United		
2016	UiTM		
2018	Rovers		
2019	Albion San Diego		
2021	Sitra Club		
2022	Whittlesea Ranges	6	(0)
2023	Strykers		

International career^{‡}
2011–	Guam	32	(2)
- * Club domestic league appearances and goals ‡ National team caps and goals as of 22 December 2024

John Landa Matkin (born 20 April 1986) is a soccer player who plays as a midfielder who played for UiTM FC. Born in the United States, he represents the Guam national team.

== Career ==
=== United Sikkim ===
On 8 January 2013 it was officially announced that Landa had signed with United Sikkim F.C. in the I-League until the end of the 2012-13 I-League. Landa then made his debut for the club in the I-League the next day on 9 January 2013 against Mumbai F.C. at home at the Paljor Stadium in which he came on as a 73rd-minute substitute for Nadong Bhutia as United Sikkim drew the match 2–2.

== International ==
Due to his heritage Matkin was able to represent the United States, Mexico, and Guam. After seeing that his chances of playing for the United States and Mexico fell short he decided to accept Guam's offer to be called up to represent them during the 2014 AFC Challenge Cup qualifiers to be held on 2 March 2013. Matkin then made his debut for Guam on 2 March 2013 against Myanmar in the first match of the qualifiers in which he started and played the full 90 minutes as Guam lost the match 5–0.

He scored his first international goal on 25 July 2014 against Northern Mariana Islands during the 2015 EAFF East Asian Cup qualification at the GFA National Training Center.

=== International goals ===
Scores and results list Guams's goal tally first.

No.	Date	Venue	Opponent	Score	Result	Competition
1.	25 July 2014	GFA National Training Center, Dededo, Guam	Northern Mariana Islands	1–0	5–0	2015 EAFF East Asian Cup qualification
2.	14 November 2019	National Football Stadium, Malé, Maldives	Maldives	2–1	3–1	2022 FIFA World Cup qualification
