= Marianas Club Championship =

Asian association football tournament for men's clubs

- Founded: 2023; 3 years ago
- Region: East Asia (EAFF)
- Teams: 2
- Current champions: (Northern Mariana Islands) Eleven Tiger
- Most championships: (Northern Mariana Islands) Eleven Tiger (1)

The Marianas Club Championship is an association football competition between clubs from neighboring Guam and the Northern Mariana Islands. Founded in 2023, the tournament features the champion of the Budweiser G-League and the Marianas Soccer League 1. The goal is to expand to four clubs by 2026. The competition is sanctioned by the East Asian Football Federation.

== History ==
In 2023, the pilot competition was created as part of the Guam Football Association Competition Department's four-year plan. It was believed the competition would spark renewed interest in soccer and the island's leagues while increasing the bond between the two islands. For the first edition of the championship, newly-formed Wings FC represented Guam while Eleven Tiger FC was Saipan's entrant. Eleven Tiger went on to win the match 2–1 with goals from Tanapon Unsa and Sunjoon Tenorio. Yvan Tcheugoue scored for Wings FC.

== Results and statistics ==
=== Matches ===
List of Marianas Club Championship matches
Date	Home team	Score	Away team	Venue	Location	Ref.
16 December 2023	(Northern Mariana Islands) Eleven Tiger	2–1	(Guam) Wings	NMI Soccer Training Center	Koblerville, Saipan	
28 February 2026	(Northern Mariana Islands) Kanoa	0–5	(Guam) Rovers	NMI Soccer Training Center	Koblerville, Saipan	

Northern Mariana Islands wins
Guam wins

=== Titles by nation ===
Nation	Titles
Northern Mariana Islands	1
Guam	0

=== Titles by club ===
Nation	Titles	Runner-up
(Northern Mariana Islands) Eleven Tiger	1	0
(Guam) Wings	0	1

== See also ==
- ASEAN Club Championship
- CAFA Silk Way Cup
- SAFF Club Championship
- Marianas Cup
