= 2019 Guam FA Cup =

Tournament details
- Country: Guam

Final positions
- Champions: Bank of Guam Strykers FC
- Runners-up: NAPA Rovers

The 2019 Guam FA Cup is the 12th season of the Guam FA Cup knockout tournament.

The draw of the tournament was held on 13 April 2019. It was played between 2 and 26 May 2019.

== First round ==
Matches played on 2–5 May 2019.

2 May: Bank of Guam Strykers II 12-0 Omega Warriors

2 May: GWM Bombers SC 6-1 NAPA Rovers Masters

3 May: Pago Bay Disasters lose by forfeit to Big Blue

3 May: IT&E Boonie Dawgs 1-5 Guam Shipyard (Amateur)

4 May: Eurocar Masters 2-0 Hi-5 Logo Rowdies

4 May: Gino's FC 1-12 FC Beercelona

5 May: Bank of Guam Strykers Masters 1-2 Crushers FC

5 May: Islanders FC (Amateur) beat (probably by forfeit) Mijoo Family

== Round of 16 ==
Matches played on 9–11 May 2019.

9 May: Guam Shipyard (Premier) 1-1 (1-3 p) GWM Bombers SC

9 May: Sidekicks SC 9-0 Guam Shipyard (Amateur)

10 May: University of Guam Tritons 9-0 FC Beercelona

10 May: Quality FC 4-1 Islanders FC (Amateur)

11 May: NAPA Rovers 6-2 Bank of Guam Strykers II

11 May: Islanders FC (Premier) beat by forfeit Big Blue

11 May: Bank of Guam Strykers (Premier) 17-0 Eurocar Masters

11 May: Lots of Art Heat 5-4 Crushers FC

== Quarterfinals ==
Matches played on 16–17 May 2019.

16 May: NAPA Rovers 10-1 GWM Bombers SC

16 May: Bank of Guam Strykers (Premier) 3-1 University of Guam Tritons

17 May: Islanders FC (Premier) 7-1 Sidekicks SC

17 May: Lots of Art Heat 1-7 Quality FC

== Semifinals ==
Matches played on 23 May 2019.

23 May: NAPA Rovers 6-4 Islanders FC (Premier)

23 May: Bank of Guam Strykers (Premier) 5-1 Quality FC

== Final ==
Match played on 26 May 2019.

26 May: NAPA Rovers 1-5 Bank of Guam Strykers (Premier)

== See also ==
- 2018–19 Guam Soccer League
