= 2018 Guam FA Cup =

Tournament details
- Country: Guam

Final positions
- Champions: Bank of Guam Strykers FC
- Runners-up: Rovers FC

The 2018 Guam FA Cup is the 11th season of the Guam FA Cup knockout tournament.

The tournament was played between 1 and 30 June 2018. In the final, Bank of Guam Strykers FC defeated Rovers FC 5–1 at the Guam Football Association National Training Center.

== See also ==
- 2017–18 Guam Soccer League
