= Wings FC =

Guam soccer club

Wings
- Full name: Wings Football Club
- Nickname: The Champions
- Short name: Wings
- Founded: 1985; 41 years ago
- Ground: GFA National Training Center
- Capacity: 5,000
- Chairman: Duane Pahl
- Manager: James Okuhama
- League: Guam Soccer League
- 2026: Guam Soccer League, 1st
| Home colours | Away colours |

Wings FC is a professional association football club from Guam, currently competing in the Guam Soccer League.

== History ==
Wings FC was founded in 1985. The club has fielded highly successful youth sides since that time. Wings FC fielded a senior team in the Guam Soccer League for the first time during the 2023 season. The club defeated Quality Distributors on February 11, 2023, for its first-ever win in the league. Nathan Nuwer and Shuntaro Suzuki scored for Wings.

In the senior team's first season, it went on to win the league title. Wings FC featured two of the top four scorers in the league. The roster also featured Jacob Toves, the league's Golden Glove winner. By virtue of its championship, the club traveled to Saipan to challenge Eleven Tiger FC in the first-ever Marianas Club Championship. Wings FC would secure another championship in 2024, beating NAPA Rovers in the championship match. Going into the match, both teams held undefeated records of 12–0, with Wings boasting the higher total goal tally of 158. The final would see Simeon Packer, Yaw Boateng, and Yvan Tcheugoue each scoring in a 3–2 victory.

== Honours ==
- Guam Men's Soccer League
  - Champions (2): 2023, 2024, 2026
