= 1994 Guam Men's Soccer League =

Statistics of Guam League in the 1994 season.

== Overview ==
Tumon Taivon won the championship.
