= Marcus Lopez =

Guamanian soccer player (born 1992)

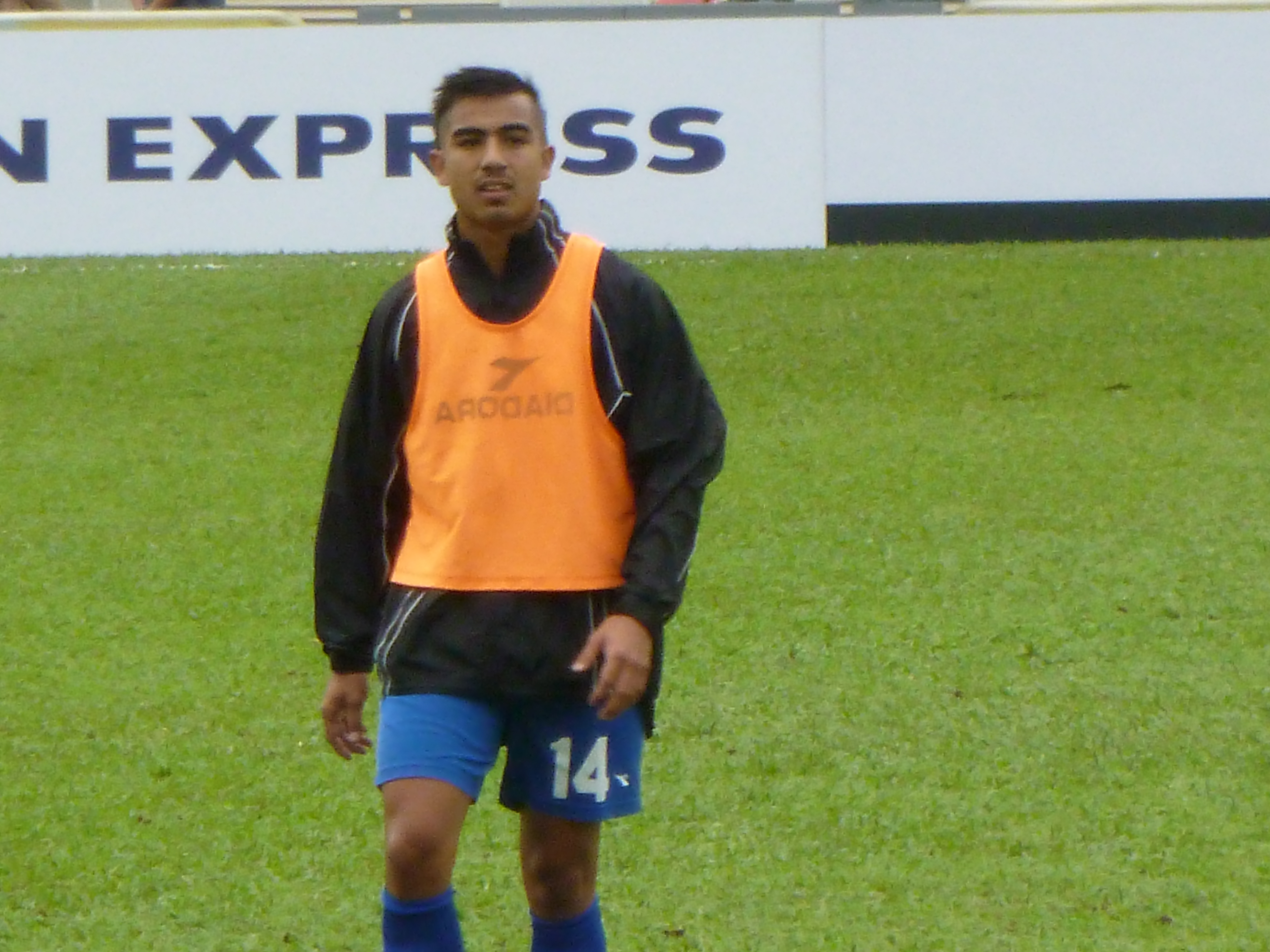

Personal information
- Full name: Marcus Phillip Joseph Lopez
- Date of birth: 9 February 1992 (age 34)
- Place of birth: Barrigada, Guam
- Height: 1.80 m (5 ft 11 in)
- Positions: Midfielder; striker

Team information
- Current team: Strykers

Youth career
- 2007: St. John's Knights
- 2007–2009: Harvest Christian Eagles

College career
Years	Team	Apps	(Gls)
2009–2011	Lasell Lasers		
2011–2012	UC Irvine Anteaters		

Senior career*
Years	Team	Apps	(Gls)
2009-2010	NO KA OI	19	(17)
2012	Guam Shipyard	17	(16)
2013	Pachanga Diliman	9	(5)
2013	Phnom Penh Crown FC		
2014-2016	Strykers	27	(33)
2016	Minerva Punjab FC	4	(2)
2016-2017	Rovers	13	(16)
2017-2018	Isla de Ladrones	16	(28)
2018-	Strykers	45	(128)

International career^{‡}
2012–	Guam	42	(7)
- * Club domestic league appearances and goals as of 2 June 2024 ‡ National team caps and goals as of 13 October 2023

Marcus Phillip Joseph Lopez (born 9 February 1992 in Barrigada, Guam) is a Guamanian international soccer player who plays for the Guam national team.

== Career ==
Lopez attended high school at St. John's School and later transferred to Harvest Christian Academy in Barrigada, Guam. He played from 2010 to 2011 for the Lasell College Lasers men's soccer team. In September 2011 he joined the Guam Men's Soccer League club Guam Shipyard.

In March 2013, Lopez joined Pachanga Diliman of the Filipino United Football League. In 2016, he joined the I-League side Minerva Punjab FC, where he scored 2 goals in 4 games.

=== International ===
Lopez made his first appearance for the Guam national football team in 2012.

He scored his first international goal on 22 July 2012 against Macau during the 2013 EAFF East Asian Cup qualification at the Leo Palace Resort, Yona.

=== International goals ===
Scores and results list the Guam's goal tally first.

List of international goals scored by Marcus Lopez
No.	Date	Venue	Opponent	Score	Result	Competition
1.	22 July 2012	Leo Palace Resort, Yona, Guam	Macau	2–0	3–0	2013 EAFF East Asian Cup qualification
2.	29 September 2012	Rizal Memorial Stadium, Manila, Philippines	Macau	2–0	3–0	2012 Philippine Peace Cup
3.	25 July 2014	Guam Football Association National Training Center, Dededo, Guam	Northern Mariana Islands	3–0	5–0	2015 EAFF East Asian Cup qualification
4.	2 September 2018	MFF Football Centre, Ulaanbaatar, Mongolia	Northern Mariana Islands	2–0	4–0	2019 EAFF E-1 Football Championship qualification
5.	2 September 2018	MFF Football Centre, Ulaanbaatar, Mongolia	Northern Mariana Islands	4–0	4–0	2019 EAFF E-1 Football Championship qualification
6.	10 September 2019	GFA National Training Center, Dededo, Guam	Philippines	1–2	1–4	2022 FIFA World Cup qualification
