= Leon Morimoto =

Guamanian soccer player

Leon Morimoto レオン・モリモト
Personal information
- Full name: Leon Marcus Morimoto
- Date of birth: 18 December 2001 (age 24)
- Place of birth: Honolulu, Hawaii, US
- Height: 1.72 m (5 ft 8 in)
- Position: Left-back

Team information
- Current team: Hunters Mongolia
- Number: 3

Youth career
- Strykers
- 2016–2017: Independiente
- 2017–2020: Temperley

Senior career*
Years	Team	Apps	(Gls)
2020–2023	Temperley II		
2024	Central Valley Fuego	0	(0)
2024–2025	Loyola	12	(0)
2025–	Hunters Mongolia	2	(2)

International career^{‡}
2021–	Guam	7	(1)
- * Club domestic league appearances and goals as of 14:57, 27 September 2025 (UTC) ‡ National team caps and goals as of September 25, 2025

Leon Marcus Morimoto (レオン・モリモト, Morimoto Leon; born 18 December 2001) is a professional soccer player who plays as a left-back for Mongolian Premier League club Hunters Mongolia. Born in the United States, he represents the Guam national team.

== Early life ==
Morimoto was born in Honolulu, Hawaii, United States, to Japanese parents. Morimoto's family moved to Argentina shortly thereafter, when he was 14 years old.

== Career ==
He plays football in the position of left back. At youth level, he played for the Strykers in Guam. He also played for the youth teams of Independiente and Temperley.

Since 2021, he has played for Temperley-2 from Greater Buenos Aires, which competes in the second division of Argentine football, Primera B Nacional.

Morimoto started his career with Temperley. He joined USL League One side Central Valley Fuego in February 2024. In summer 2025, Morimoto signed for Mongolian Premier League club Hunters FC Mongolia from Loyola of the Philippines Football League.

=== International ===
Since 2021, he has played for the Guam national team. He made his debut on May 30, 2021, in Suzhou in a World Cup qualifying second round match against China (0:7), playing for 90 minutes. By 2022, he had played four matches without scoring any goals.

He scored his first international goal on 14 December 2024 against Macau during the 2025 EAFF E-1 Football Championship qualifying at the Kai Tak Youth Sports Ground.

=== International goals ===
No.	Date	Venue	Opponent	Score	Result	Competition
1.	14 December 2024	Kai Tak Youth Sports Ground, Hong Kong	Macau	0–1	1–2	2025 EAFF E-1 Football Championship qualifying
