= 2015 EAFF East Asian Cup =

2015年东亚杯男子足球赛

Tournament details
- Host country: China
- City: Wuhan
- Dates: 2–9 August 2015 (Final)
- Teams: 4 (from 1 sub-confederation)

Final positions
- Champions: South Korea (3rd title)
- Runners-up: China
- Third place: North Korea
- Fourth place: Japan

Tournament statistics
- Matches played: 6
- Goals scored: 11 (1.83 per match)
- Top scorer: (Japan) Yuki Muto (2 goals)
- Best player: (South Korea) Jang Hyun-soo
- Best goalkeeper: (North Korea) Ri Myong-guk

The 2015 EAFF East Asian Cup was the 6th edition of the EAFF East Asian Cup, the football championship of East Asia. It was held in China in 2015. Two preliminary competitions were held during 2014.

== First preliminary round ==
- All matches were played in Guam.

Pos	Team	Pld	W	D	L	GF	GA	GD	Pts	Qualification
1	Guam (H)	3	2	1	0	7	0	+7	7	Advance to Preliminary round 2
2	Macau	3	1	1	1	4	4	0	4	
3	Mongolia	3	1	0	2	6	5	+1	3	
4	Northern Mariana Islands	3	1	0	2	2	10	−8	3	

Source: EAFF
(H) Hosts
21 July 2014
15:00 UTC+10

Mongolia	4–0	Northern Mariana Islands
Tögöldör 20'; Gal-Erden 23'; Murun 40'; Bilegtii 59'	Report

GFA National Training Center, Dededo
Referee: Jumpei Iida (Japan)
21 July 2014
17:30 UTC+10

Guam	0–0	Macau
	Report

GFA National Training Center, Dededo
Referee: Kao Jung-fang (Chinese Taipei)

23 July 2014
15:00 UTC+10

Northern Mariana Islands	2–1	Macau
Swaim 38'; Schuler 65'	Report	Pang Chi Hang 17'

GFA National Training Center, Dededo
Referee: Kim Hee-gon (South Korea)
23 July 2014
17:30 UTC+10

Guam	2–0	Mongolia
Guy 16', 75'	Report

GFA National Training Center, Dededo
Referee: Ng Kai Lam (Hong Kong)

25 July 2014
15:00 UTC+10

Macau	3–2	Mongolia
Lam Ka Seng ?'; Chan Man ?'; Tang Hou Fai ?'	Report	Lumbengarav ?'; Tsolmon ?'

GFA National Training Center, Dededo
Referee: Kao Jung-fang (Chinese Taipei)
25 July 2014
17:30 UTC+10

Guam	5–0	Northern Mariana Islands
Matkin 32'; Guy 35'; Lopez 40'; S. Nicklaw 69'; Mariano 90'	Report

GFA National Training Center, Dededo
Referee: Jumpei Iida (Japan)

=== Awards ===
Top Scorer	Most Valuable Player
(Guam) Ryan Guy	(Guam) Ryan Guy

== Second preliminary round ==
Venue: Taiwan
Date: 13 – 19 November 2014

Pos	Team	Pld	W	D	L	GF	GA	GD	Pts	Qualification
1	North Korea	3	2	1	0	7	2	+5	7	Advance to Final Competition
2	Hong Kong	3	1	1	1	2	2	0	4	
3	Guam	3	1	1	1	3	6	−3	4	
4	Chinese Taipei (H)	3	0	1	2	1	3	−2	1	

Source: EAFF
(H) Hosts
13 November 2014
16:00 UTC+8

North Korea	2–1	Hong Kong
Ri Chol-myong 59'; O Hyok-chol 80'	report	McKee 83'

Taipei Municipal Stadium, Taipei
Attendance: 800
Referee: Hiroyuki Kimura (Japan)
13 November 2014
19:00 UTC+8

Chinese Taipei	1–2	Guam
Chen Hao-wei 56'	report	Cunliffe 14' (pen.); Malcolm 42'

Taipei Municipal Stadium, Taipei
Attendance: 2,405
Referee: Kim Dae-yong (South Korea)

16 November 2014
16:00 UTC+8

Guam	1–5	North Korea
Cunliffe 61'	report	Jong Il-gwan 14', 72'; Ri Sang-chol 85', 89'; Kye Song-hyok 90'

Taipei Municipal Stadium, Taipei
Attendance: 657
Referee: Tan Hai (China)
16 November 2014
19:00 UTC+8

Chinese Taipei	0–1	Hong Kong
	report	Lam Ka Wai 54' (pen.)

Taipei Municipal Stadium, Taipei
Attendance: 8,860
Referee: Kim Song-ho (North Korea)

19 November 2014
16:00 UTC+8

Hong Kong	0–0	Guam
	report

Taipei Municipal Stadium, Taipei
Attendance: 167
Referee: Kim Dae-yong (South Korea)
19 November 2014
19:00 UTC+8

Chinese Taipei	0–0	North Korea
	report

Taipei Municipal Stadium, Taipei
Attendance: 5,807
Referee: Hiroyuki Kimura (Japan)

=== Awards ===
Top Scorer	Most Valuable Player
(Guam) Jason Cunliffe (North Korea) Jong Il-gwan (North Korea) Ri Sang-chol	(North Korea) Jong Il-gwan

== Final tournament ==
=== Match officials ===
Referees

- (Iran) Alireza Faghani
- (Saudi Arabia) Fahad Al-Mirdasi
- (Malaysia) Mohd Amirul Izwan
- (Singapore) Muhammad Taqi Aljaafari

Assistant referees

- (Australia) Nathan MacDonald
- (Iran) Mohammadreza Mansouri
- (Saudi Arabia) Abdullah Al-Shalawi
- (Malaysia) Mohd Yusri Bin Muhamad
- (Singapore) Jeffrey Goh
- (Chinese Taipei) Hsu Min Yu

=== Final stage ===
The final stage was held in Wuhan, Hubei, China on August 2 to 9, 2015.

Pos	Team	Pld	W	D	L	GF	GA	GD	Pts
1	South Korea (C)	3	1	2	0	3	1	+2	5
2	China (H)	3	1	1	1	3	3	0	4
3	North Korea	3	1	1	1	2	3	−1	4
4	Japan	3	0	2	1	3	4	−1	2

Source: EAFF
(C) Champions; (H) Hosts
2 August 2015
18:20 UTC+8

North Korea	2–1	Japan
Ri Hyok-chol 78'; Pak Hyon-il 88'	report	Muto 3'

Wuhan Sports Center Stadium, Wuhan
Referee: Alireza Faghani (Iran)
2 August 2015
21:00 UTC+8

China	0–2	South Korea
	report	Kim Seung-dae 45'; Lee Jong-ho 57'

Wuhan Sports Center Stadium, Wuhan
Referee: Fahad Al-Mirdasi (Saudi Arabia)

5 August 2015
18:20 UTC+8

Japan	1–1	South Korea
Yamaguchi 39'	report	Jang Hyun-soo 26' (pen.)

Wuhan Sports Center Stadium, Wuhan
Referee: Muhammad Taqi Aljaafari (Singapore)
5 August 2015
21:00 UTC+8

China	2–0	North Korea
Yu Dabao 36'; Wang Yongpo 51' (pen.)	report

Wuhan Sports Center Stadium, Wuhan
Referee: Mohd Amirul Izwan (Malaysia)

9 August 2015
17:10 UTC+8

South Korea	0–0	North Korea
	report

Wuhan Sports Center Stadium, Wuhan
Referee: Alireza Faghani (Iran)
9 August 2015
20:10 UTC+8

China	1–1	Japan
Wu Lei 10'	report	Muto 41'

Wuhan Sports Center Stadium, Wuhan
Referee: Fahad Al-Mirdasi (Saudi Arabia)

=== Awards ===
Best Goalkeeper	Best Defender	Top Scorer	Most Valuable Player
(North Korea) Ri Myong-guk	(South Korea) Kim Young-gwon	(Japan) Yuki Muto	(South Korea) Jang Hyun-soo

=== Goalscorers ===
2 goals

- (Japan) Yuki Muto

1 goal

- (China) Yu Dabao
- (China) Wang Yongpo
- (China) Wu Lei
- (Japan) Hotaru Yamaguchi
- (North Korea) Ri Hyok-chol
- (North Korea) Pak Hyon-il
- (South Korea) Jang Hyun-soo
- (South Korea) Kim Seung-dae
- (South Korea) Lee Jong-ho

== Final ranking ==
Pos	Team	Pld	W	D	L	GF	GA	GD	Pts	Final result
1	South Korea	3	1	2	0	3	1	+2	5	Champions
2	China	3	1	1	1	3	3	0	4	Runners-up
3	North Korea	6	3	2	1	9	5	+4	11	Third place
4	Japan	3	0	2	1	3	4	−1	2	Fourth place
5	Hong Kong	3	1	1	1	2	2	0	4	Eliminated in Second Preliminary Round
6	Guam	6	3	2	1	10	6	+4	11	Eliminated in Second Preliminary Round
7	Chinese Taipei	3	0	1	2	1	3	−2	1	Eliminated in Second Preliminary Round
8	Macau	3	1	1	1	4	4	0	4	Eliminated in First Preliminary Round
9	Mongolia	3	1	0	2	6	5	+1	3	Eliminated in First Preliminary Round
10	Northern Mariana Islands	3	1	0	2	2	10	−8	3	Eliminated in First Preliminary Round

Source: EAFF

Per statistical convention in football, matches decided in extra time are counted as wins and losses, while matches decided by penalty shoot-out are counted as draws.
