= Ian Mariano =

Guamanian soccer player

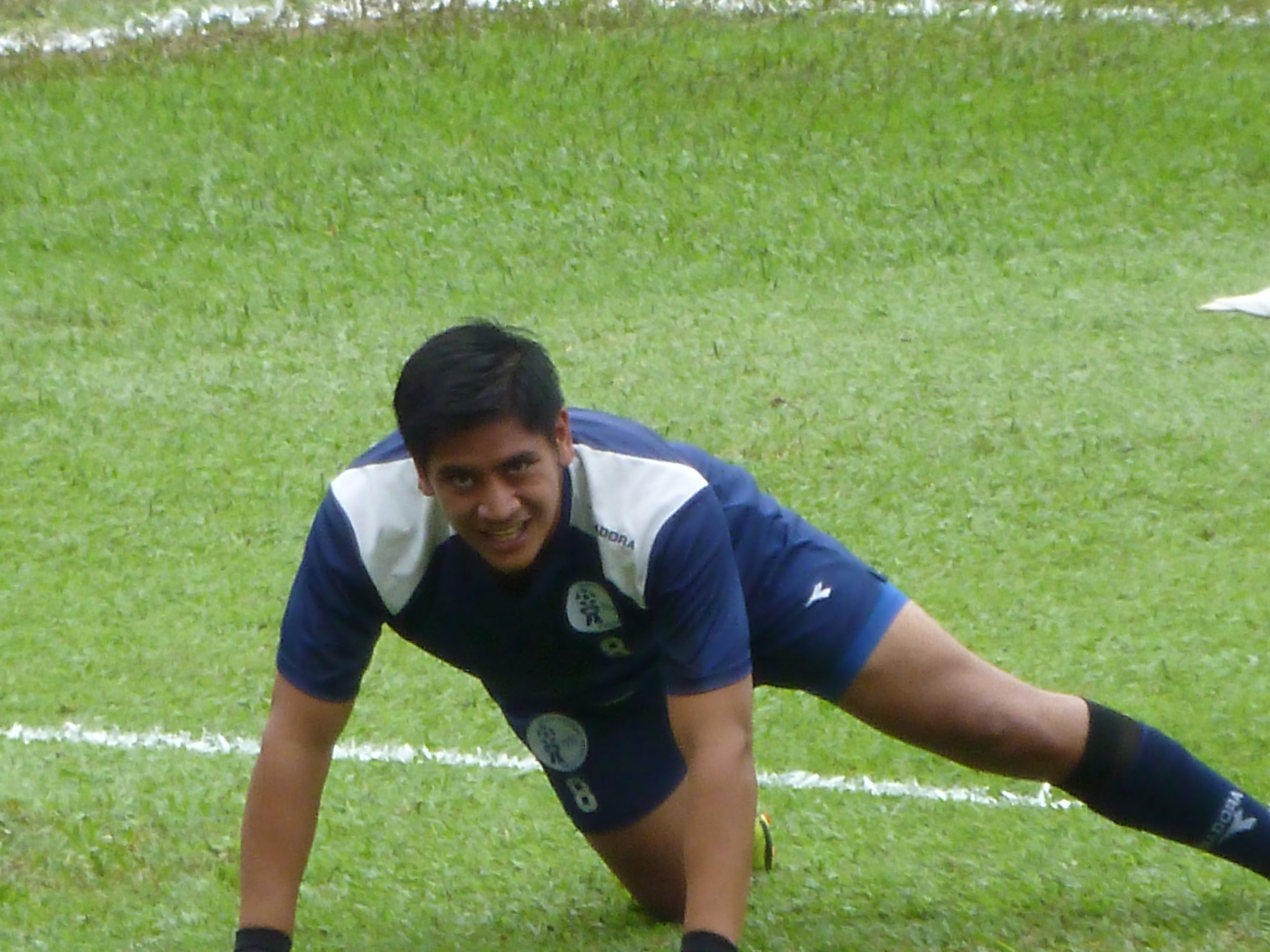
- Mariano with Guam in December 2012

Personal information
- Date of birth: October 7, 1990 (age 36)
- Place of birth: Tamuning, Guam
- Height: 1.78 m (5 ft 10 in)
- Position: Defender

Team information
- Current team: Bank of Guam Strykers

Senior career*
| Years | Team | Apps | (Gls) |
| 2007–2008 | Guam Shipyard | 14 | (5) |
| 2008–2010 | Islanders | 35 | (7) |
| 2010–2012 | Cars Plus FC | 48 | (2) |
| 2012 | Table 35 Espada | 7 | (2) |
| 2013 | Pachanga Diliman | 15 | (2) |
| 2013–2019 | Rovers FC | 22 | (12) |
| 2019– | Bank of Guam Strykers | | |

International career^{‡}
| 2007– | Guam | 42 | (3) |
- * Club domestic league appearances and goals as of 15 June 2013 ‡ National team caps and goals as of 13 June 2021

Ian Mariano (born 7 October 1990) is a Guamanian international soccer player who plays for Bank of Guam Strykers. He made his first appearance for the Guam national football team in 2007. Ian has Filipino blood. He is one quarter Filipino due to his grandmother who comes from Samar, Philippines.

== International goals ==
| No. | Date | Venue | Opponent | Score | Result | Competition |
|---|---|---|---|---|---|---|
| 1. | 13 March 2009 | Leo Palace Resort, Yona, Guam | Northern Mariana Islands | 2–0 | 2–1 | 2010 East Asian Football Championship |
| 2. | 6 March 2013 | Thuwunna Stadium, Yangon, Myanmar | Chinese Taipei | 2–0 | 3–0 | 2014 AFC Challenge Cup qualification |
| 3. | 25 July 2014 | Guam Football Association National Training Center, Dededo, Guam | Northern Mariana Islands | 5–0 | 5–0 | 2015 EAFF East Asian Cup |
