= Ka'eo Gonsalves =

Guamanian soccer player

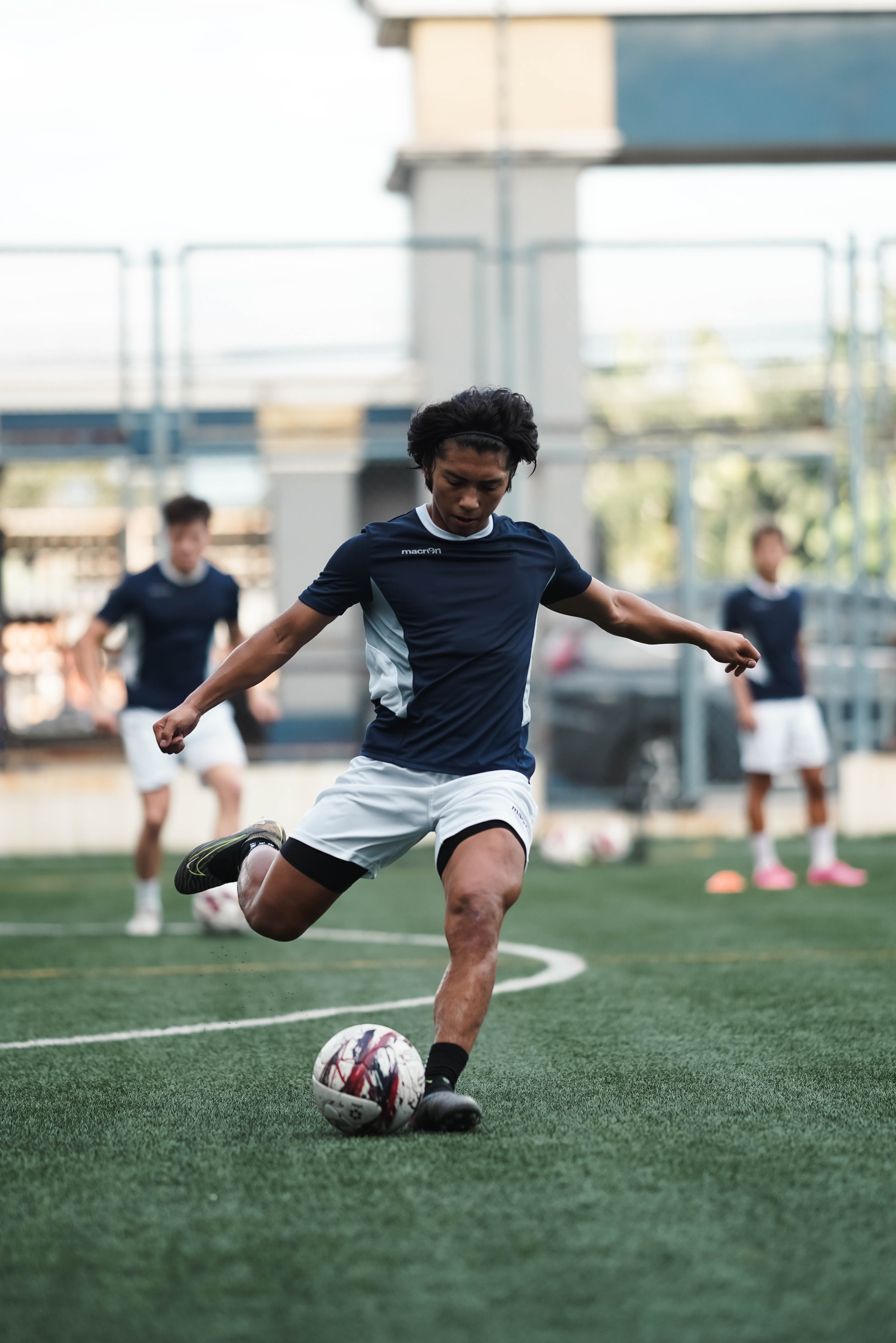
- Gonsalves at Inspire Academy in the Philippines

Personal information
- Full name: Ka’eo Kainoa Carino Gonsalves
- Date of birth: January 6, 2005 (age 21)
- Place of birth: Newport, Rhode Island, United States
- Height: 1.65 m (5 ft 5 in)
- Position: Forward

Team information
- Current team: Hampden–Sydney Tigers
- Number: 16

Youth career
- 2013–2023: Richmond Kickers

College career
Years	Team	Apps	(Gls)
2023–	Hampden–Sydney Tigers	7	(0)

International career^{‡}
2022–	Guam U20	4	(0)
2023–	Guam	2	(0)
- ‡ National team caps and goals as of 00:20, 18 October 2023 (UTC)

Ka’eo Kainoa Carino Gonsalves (born January 6, 2005) is a Guamanian soccer player who currently plays for the Hampden–Sydney Tigers and the Guam national team.

== Career ==
=== Youth ===
As a youth, Gonsalves joined the academy of the Richmond Kickers of the USL Championship and later USL League One at age eight. He remained with the club until 2023. He was also a standout high school soccer player with Cosby High School in Midlothian, Virginia. During his senior season in 2023, he tallied fifteen goals and ten assists en route to first team all-state and second team all-state honors. He served as the team's captain and was named co-MVP.

=== College ===
In May 2023, Gonsalves committed to play college soccer for the Tigers of Hampden–Sydney College of the NCAA Division III.

== International career ==
In 2018 Gonsalves was invited to an identification camp by the United States Soccer Federation for consideration for inclusion in the country's national teams. Gonsalves qualifies to represent Guam through his mother who is a Chamorro from Mangilao. His first international experience with Guam came in a training camp for the national under-20 team held in the Philippines in 2022. He scored for the team in a friendly against the Philippines U20 team as part of the camp. Later that year, he was included in Guam's squad for 2023 AFC U-20 Asian Cup qualification in Laos. He appeared in all of Guam's matches in the tournament including against Japan, Yemen, Palestine, and the hosts.

Gonsalves received his first call up to the Guam senior national team in October 2023 for a two-leg series against Singapore in 2026 FIFA World Cup qualification. He made his senior debut on October 12, 2023, in the first leg of the series. Gonsalves received a yellow card in the eventual 1–2 away defeat.

=== International career statistics ===
As of match played 17 October 2023

Guam national team
Year	Apps	Goals
2023	2	0
Total	2	0
