= Chris Mendiola =

Guamanian soccer player

Christopher Mendiola
Personal information
- Full name: Christopher Mendiola
- Date of birth: 28 January 1990 (age 36)
- Place of birth: Tamuning, Guam
- Height: 1.85 m (6 ft 1 in)
- Position: Striker

International career^{‡}
Years	Team	Apps	(Gls)
2007–	Guam	11	(4)
- ‡ National team caps and goals as of 4 December 2012

Christopher Mendiola (born 28 January 1990) is a Guamanian soccer player who plays as a striker.

== International goals ==
No.	Date	Venue	Opponent	Score	Result	Competition
1.	2 April 2008	Zhongshan Soccer Stadium, Taipei, Taiwan	Sri Lanka	1–2	1–5	2008 AFC Challenge Cup qualification
