= Guam national football team =

Guam
- Nickname: Matao (The Noblemen)
- Association: Guam Football Association (GFA)
- Confederation: AFC (Asia)
- Sub-confederation: EAFF (East Asia)
- Head coach: Ross Awa
- Captain: Jason Cunliffe
- Most caps: Jason Cunliffe (74)
- Top scorer: Jason Cunliffe (26)
- Home stadium: GFA National Training Center
- FIFA code: GUM
First colors	Second colors

FIFA ranking
- Current: 203 (7 October 2026)
- Highest: 146 (August–September 2015)
- Lowest: 207 (March 2022)

First international
- Guam 1–5 Solomon Islands (Tumon, Guam; 2 August 1975)

Biggest win
- Unofficial; Palau 2–15 Guam (Koror City, Palau; 1 August 1998); Official; Guam 9–0 Northern Mariana Islands (Hagåtña, Guam; 1 April 2007)

Biggest defeat
- North Korea 21–0 Guam (Taipei, Taiwan; 11 March 2005)

Pacific Games
- Appearances: 5 (first in 1975)
- Best result: Sixth place (1979)

Micronesian Games
- Appearances: 1 (first in 1998)
- Best result: Runners-up (1998)

The Guam national football team represents Guam, an overseas territory of the United States, in men's international soccer and is controlled by the Guam Football Association. Affiliated with FIFA since 1996 and a member of AFC since 1991.

Guam reached its highest ever position in the FIFA World Ranking at 146th in 2015 after victories over Turkmenistan and India. Guam's first FIFA World Cup qualification match was played against Iran national football team at Tabriz.

Guam has never qualified for the FIFA World Cup and AFC Asian Cup.

== History ==
=== Beginnings (1960s–1990s) ===
Football in Guam began in the 1960s, on the initiative of two pioneers: an Irish priest, Tony Gillespie, and an owner of a construction company, Charles Whang, who settled in Guam and created the Guam Soccer Cup before becoming the first president of the Guam Football Association in 1975.

Guam played its first international match at the 1975 Pacific Games against Solomon Islands, losing 5–1. This result was followed by an 11–0 loss to Fiji, eliminating them from the competition. In the 1979 Games, Guam again lost twice to New Caledonia 11–1 and New Hebrides 5–0. Progressing to the Consolation Tournament, Guam registered their first victories, beating Western Samoa 4–2, and Tuvalu 7–2 before losing again to New Hebrides, 5–1.

=== AFC and FIFA Member (1991–2011) ===
Despite being considered part of Oceania, and having never faced an Asian team to that point, Guam became an associate member of the AFC in 1991 but continued to participate in the Pacific Games. In 1996, Guam became both a full member of the AFC and of FIFA.

As a full member of the AFC and FIFA, Guam played its first matches against Asian teams as part of the 1996 AFC Asian Cup qualification losing all three matches against South Korea (9–0), Vietnam (9–0), and Chinese Taipei (9–2).

In 1998, Guam played in the Micronesian Games, though the tournament was a 9-a-side competition with 80 minute matches. Guam finished top of the group stage but lost 3–0 to Northern Mariana Islands in the final. Guam entered the 2000 Asian Cup qualification but finished last in their group again, losing to Vietnam (11–0), China (19–0), and Philippines (2–0).

Guam became one of the founding members of the East Asian Football Federation in 2002 and participated in the qualifiers for the inaugural 2003 East Asian Football Championship, finishing last again without registering a goal. The same is true for the 2004 AFC Asian Cup qualification, beaten by Bhutan and Mongolia. For the 2006 World Cup qualifiers, Guam entered and was scheduled to face Nepal in the first round but both Nepal and Guam withdrew for financial reasons before their first match.

In the 2005 East Asian Football Championship qualifiers, Guam lost all four matches heavily, against Chinese Taipei (9–0), Hong Kong (15–0), Mongolia (4–1), and North Korea (21–0). Following these defeats, Guam entered the 2006 AFC Challenge Cup, a competition designed for emerging nations to help develop their football. Guam again lost all three matches to Palestine (11–0), Bangladesh (3–0), and Cambodia (3–0).

Guam advanced to the second stage of qualifying in the 2008 East Asian Football Championship by beating Northern Marianas 12–2 over two legs but they were eliminated in the next round by Chinese Taipei (10–0), and Hong Kong (15–1). In the 2010 East Asian Football Championship qualifiers, Guam managed to get its first victory over a FIFA member, beating Mongolia 1–0. They would go on to top the group before being eliminated at the next stage. Guam returned to the 2011 Pacific Games after a sixteen-year absence, but only managed to beat American Samoa 2–0, finishing second last and failing to advance to the knock-out stages.

=== Building the football structure (2012–present) ===
Gary White became Guam's manager in 2012 and called-up players of Guamanian origin based in the United States like Ryan Guy and A. J. DeLaGarza to improve the level of his team. In the 2013 EAFF East Asian Cup, Matao managed to advance past the first round by beating Northern Marianas (3–1) and Macao (3–0). Guam then participated in the 2012 Philippine Peace Cup, replacing Hong Kong, losing against Philippines (1–0) and Chinese Taipei (2–0) but beat Macao (3–0) in its final group game to finish third. Guam advanced to the second qualifying stage of both the 2015 and 2017 EAFF Championship finishing third and fourth respectively and failing to advance the final competition.

Map of Guam stadium

- 1 Dededo
- 2 Hagåtña
- 3 Tumon
- 4 Yona

In 2018 FIFA World Cup qualification, Guam beat Turkmenistan (1–0) and India (2–1), finishing fourth in their group and qualifying for the 2019 Asian Cup third round qualifiers, although Guam withdrew before the draw took place. Guam then failed to progress past the first qualifying round for the 2019 EAFF Championship.

During the 2022 FIFA World Cup qualifiers, Guam beat Bhutan 5–1 over two legs but lost all eight of their second round matches and finished bottom of their group, scoring two goals and conceding 32.

After nearly not playing an international match for a year, Guam participated in the first round of the 2026 FIFA World Cup qualification against Singapore, where they would ultimately lost 3–1 on aggregate.

During the 2025 EAFF E-1 Football Championship preliminary, Guam won their first match against Macau on 14 December 2024 in a 2–1 win, its the first time they won against different opponents aside from Northern Mariana Islands.

==== 2026 FIFA Series ====
The men's competition of the 2026 FIFA Series was split into nine different sections hosted across eight countries. In November 2025, FIFA announced that Puerto Rico would host one such section in Bayamón, in which Guam, the U.S. Virgin Islands and American Samoa would also compete. The Puerto Rican section of the tournament was held in a four-match format (semi-finals, third-place match and final) in late March 2026. Guam finished third in the section after losing to hosts Puerto Rico in its semi-final but defeating American Samoa in the third-place match.

== Team image ==
=== Nicknames ===
Until 2011, the nickname of the Guamanian selection was Chamorros, in reference to the local population of Guam. When Gary White took charge of Guam, the team has changed their nickname to Matao, referring to highest social class in ancient Chamorro society in the Chamorro language. White also promoted the use of the Guam pledge before each match of the selection, referred to as the Inifresi.

== Results and fixtures ==
The following is a list of match results in the last 12 months, as well as any future matches that have been scheduled.

Win Draw Loss Fixture

=== 2026 ===
25 March 2026 FIFA Series	Puerto Rico	4–0	Guam	Bayamón, Puerto Rico
20:00 UTC−4	W. Rivera 52', 61'; R. Rivera 57'; Antonetti 76' (pen.)	Report		Stadium: Juan Ramón Loubriel Stadium; Referee: José Corporán (Dominican Republic)

28 March 2026 FIFA Series	American Samoa	0–6	Guam	Bayamón, Puerto Rico
16:00 UTC−4		Report	Mitchell 3' (o.g.); Berg 13', 35'; Ochoa 39' (pen.); Taitague 57'; Gomez 86'	Stadium: Juan Ramón Loubriel Stadium; Referee: José Torres (Puerto Rico)

3 June Friendly	Philippines	5–1	Guam	Manila, Philippines
19:30 UTC+8	Mrowka 5'; Gayoso 18'; Rublico 44'; Leipold 64', 90+2'		Berg 60'	Stadium: Rizal Memorial Stadium; Attendance: 2,243; Referee: Songkran Bunmeekiart (Thailand)

6 June Friendly	Guam	1–6	Myanmar	Manila, Philippines
19:30 UTC+8	J. Gomez 90+1' (pen.)		Soe Moe Kyaw 13'; Maung Maung Lwin 23'; Win Naing Tun 35', 53'; Zaw Win Thein 57'; Shai Wanna Aung 86'	Stadium: Rizal Memorial Stadium; Referee: Nawal Zubir (Malaysia)

== Coaching staff ==
Position	Name
Head coach	(Guam) (Philippines) Ross Awa
Assistant coach	(United States) Christopher Malenab
Assistant coach	(Austria) Manfred Preschern
Goalkeeper coach	(Netherlands) Jeroen Bos
Video Analyst	(United States) Christopher Malenab
Team Doctor	(Guam) Dr. Luis Cruz
Physiotherapist	(United States) Dr. Jon Thompson
Physiotherapist	(Philippines) Walfred Javier
Team Manager	(Guam) Vance Manibusan
High Performance Manager	(Russia) Pavel Gubenko
Media Officer	(Guam) Jill Espiritu
Equipment Director	(Guam) Thomas Castro

=== Coaching history ===
- (Northern Ireland) Willie McFaul (1999–2003)
- (Japan) Sugao Kambe (2003–2005)
- (Japan) Norio Tsukitate (2005–2009)
- (Japan) Kazuo Uchida (2011–2012)
- (England) Gary White (2012–2016)
- (United States) Darren Sawatzky (2016–2017)
- (Australia) Karl Dodd (2017–2021)
- (South Korea) Seo Dong-won (2021)
- (South Korea) Kim Sang-hoon (2021–2023)
- (Guam) Ross Awa (2023–present)

== Players ==
=== Current squad ===
The following players were called up for the 2025 EAFF E-1 Football Championship preliminary competition.

Caps and goals correct as of December 14, 2024, after the match against Macau.

No.	Pos.	Player	Date of birth (age)	Caps	Goals	Club
1	GK	John-Michael Guidroz	January 1, 2004 (age 22)	1	0	(United States Soccer Federation) University of West Florida
18	GK	Josiah Jones	November 28, 2006 (age 19)	1	0	(Guam Football Association) Bank of Guam Strykers FC
21	GK	Dallas Jaye	June 19, 1993 (age 33)	22	0	free agent
	GK	Zaine Rocca	June 28, 2007 (age 19)	0	0	(United States Soccer Federation) Total Futbol Academy
2	DF	Morgan McKenna	January 16, 2003 (age 23)	3	0	(United States Soccer Federation) Muskingum University
3	DF	Takumi Ito	February 3, 2000 (age 26)	4	0	(Lao Football Federation) Ezra
4	DF	Kyle Halehale	June 3, 2002 (age 24)	13	0	(United States Soccer Federation) Mercyhurst University
5	DF	Leon Morimoto	December 18, 2001 (age 24)	5	1	(Mongolian Football Federation) Hunters Mongolia
13	DF	Anthony Quidachay	June 11, 2002 (age 24)	2	0	(United States Soccer Federation) Chatham Cougars
15	DF	Shane Healy	July 3, 1998 (age 28)	3	0	(Guam Football Association) Bank of Guam Strykers FC
20	DF	Levi Buckwalter	December 29, 2004 (age 21)	2	0	(Guam Football Association) Wings FC
22	DF	Isiah Lagutang	August 3, 1997 (age 29)	13	1	(Guam Football Association) Bank of Guam Strykers FC
23	DF	Jonahan Romero	March 17, 1988 (age 38)	34	0	(United States Soccer Federation) SYC United
	DF	Nate Lee	May 6, 1994 (age 32)	11	0	(United States Soccer Federation) FC Frederick
	DF	Dane Agustin	January 23, 2006 (age 20)	2	0	(United States Soccer Federation) San Antonio FC Academy
6	MF	Joey Ciochetto	October 22, 1996 (age 29)	4	0	(United States Soccer Federation) Irvine Zeta
8	MF	Alec Taitague	May 9, 2000 (age 26)	31	3	(United States Soccer Federation) Roanoke Maroons
10	MF	Jason Cunliffe (captain)	October 23, 1983 (age 42)	69	26	(Guam Football Association) Bank of Guam Strykers FC
11	MF	Nainoa Norton	April 3, 2004 (age 22)	2	0	(United States Soccer Federation) Olivet Nazarene University
12	MF	Nathan Sablan	August 10, 1993 (age 33)	2	0	(Philippine Football Federation) Mendiola 1991
14	MF	Jason Castro	July 6, 2007 (age 19)	1	0	(United States Soccer Federation) Strikers FC Irvine
	MF	John Matkin	April 20, 1986 (age 40)	30	2	Free agent
	MF	Jude Bischoff	April 26, 1992 (age 34)	2	0	(Guam Football Association) Guam Shipyard
	MF	Travis Nicklaw	December 21, 1993 (age 32)	36	1	Free agent
7	FW	James Gomez	September 15, 2004 (age 22)	5	3	(United States Soccer Federation) Claremont McKenna College
9	FW	Oz Rocca	August 10, 2004 (age 22)	3	0	(United States Soccer Federation) Cal State Bakersfield Roadrunners
16	FW	Levi Berg	April 15, 2008 (age 18)	1	0	(Guam Football Association) Guam Shipyard
17	FW	Shuntaro Suzuki	October 21, 2005 (age 20)	3	1	(Guam Football Association) Wings FC
19	FW	Daniel Glasscock	May 19, 2004 (age 22)	1	0	(Guam Football Association) Manhoben Lalahi FC
	FW	Marcus Lopez	February 9, 1992 (age 34)	39	7	(Guam Football Association) Bank of Guam Strykers FC
	FW	Eddie Na	February 12, 1996 (age 30)	8	0	(United States Soccer Federation) Tacoma Stars
	FW	Ka'eo Gonsalves	January 6, 2005 (age 21)	2	0	(United States Soccer Federation) Richmond Kickers

== Player records ==
As of June 6, 2026
Players in bold are still active with Guam.

=== Most appearances ===
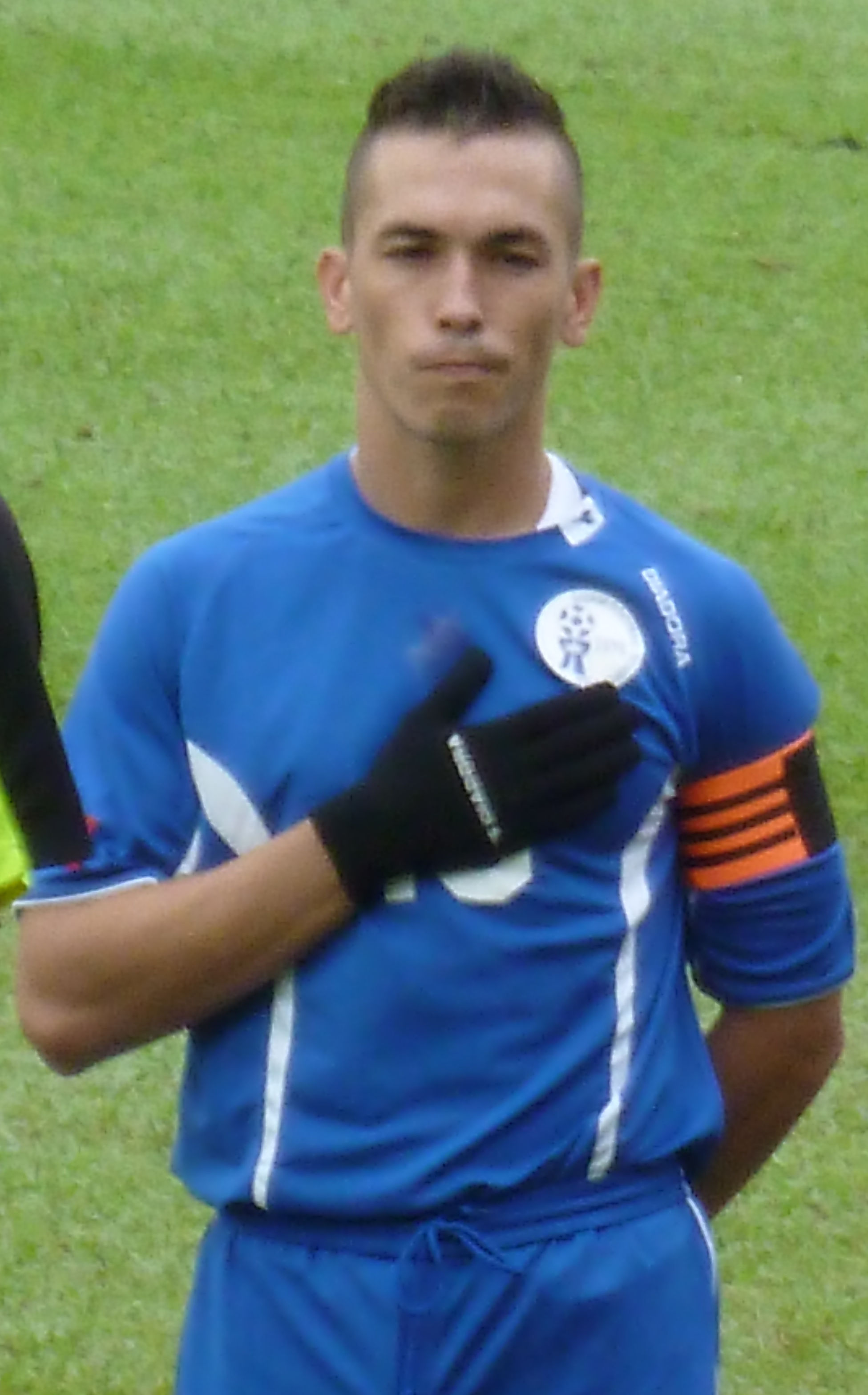
Jason Cunliffe is Guam's top goalscorer and their most-capped player

Rank	Player	Caps	Goals	Career
1	**Jason Cunliffe**	74	26	2006–present
2	**Marcus Lopez**	43	7	2012–present
3	Ian Mariano	42	3	2007–2019
4	Dylan Naputi	40	4	2011–2019
5	**Travis Nicklaw**	39	1	2012–present
6	Dominic Gadia	36	0	2003–2019
6	Mark Chargualaf	36	0	2007–2021
6	**Jonahan Romero**	36	0	2012–present
9	Shawn Nicklaw	35	2	2012–2019
10	Ryan Guy	33	4	2012–2016
10	Micah Paulino	33	0	2008–2016

=== Top goalscorers ===
Rank	Player	Goals	Caps	Ratio	Career
1	**Jason Cunliffe**	26	74	0.35	2006–present
2	Matthew Naputi	13	—	—	1998–2005
3	Zachary Pangelinan	8	12	0.67	2005–2008
4	**Marcus Lopez**	7	43	0.16	2012–present
5	Joshua Borja	5	15	0.33	2009–2013
6	**James Gomez**	4	9	0.44	2021–present
6	Christopher Mendiola	4	11	0.36	2007–2009
6	Shane Malcolm	4	29	0.14	2014–2019
6	Ryan Guy	4	33	0.12	2012–2016
6	Dylan Naputi	4	40	0.1	2011–2019

== Records and statistics ==
- Guam player sent off: (4 times)
  - John Matkin, v Iran, 17 November 2015 (51st minute)
  - Alex Lee, v Chinese Taipei, 12 November 2016 (18th minute)
  - Shawn Nicklaw, v Maldives, 5 September 2019 (81st minute)
  - Dane Agustin, v Singapore, 17 October 2023 (90+3rd minute)
- Opponent player sent off: (2 times)
  - Sehnaj Singh, v India, 12 November 2015 (41st minute)
  - Alireza Beiranvand, v Iran, 17 November 2015 (72nd minute)
- Guma first matches played: v Solomon Islands, 2 August 1975
- Longest winning streak: 3: (3 times)
  - from 6 June 1999 to 8 June 1999
  - from 27 April 2008 to 13 March 2009
  - from 23 July 2014 to 13 November 2014
- Longest unbeaten streak: 4: (2 times)
  - from 27 April 2008 to 15 March 2009
  - from 21 July 2014 to 13 November 2014
- Longest losing streak: 17: from 23 January 2000 to 3 April 2006
- Longest winless streak: 19: from 23 January 2000 to 6 April 2006
- Longest goalless streak: 1,238 minutes: from 23 January 2000 to 9 March 2005
- Most consecutive minutes without conceding a goal: 341 minutes: from 30 March 2014 to 13 November 2014
- Oldest Guam player: 42 years and 223 days: Jason Cunliffe, v Philippines, 3 June 2026
- Youngest Guam player: 15 years and 179 days: Levi Berg, v Singapore, 12 October 2023
- Most appearances: 74: Jason Cunliffe, from 3 April 2006 to present
- Most consecutive appearances:
  - 28: Jason Cunliffe, from 13 November 2014 to 19 November 2019
  - 27: Ryan Guy, from 2 March 2013 to 12 November 2016
- Top goalscorer: 26: Jason Cunliffe, from 3 April 2006 to present
- Largest comeback to wins the match: 1: v Northern Mariana Islands, 18 July 2012
- Largest blown lead to lose the match: 2: (2 times)
  - v Mongolia, 23 June 2007
  - v Chinese Taipei, 25 August 2009
- Most goals by a player in a match: 5: Zachary Pangelinan, v Northern Mariana Islands, 1 April 2007
- Most goals by a player in first half: 3: Zachary Pangelinan, v Northern Mariana Islands, 1 April 2007
- Most goals by a player in second half: 2: (6 times)
  - Zachary Pangelinan, v Northern Mariana Islands, 1 April 2007
  - Jason Cunliffe, v Northern Mariana Islands, 18 July 2012
  - Jason Cunliffe, v Aruba, 27 March 2014
  - Jason Cunliffe, v Bhutan, 11 June 2019
  - Jason Cunliffe, v Northern Mariana Islands, 22 February 2022
  - James Gomez, v Northern Mariana Islands, 22 December 2024
  - Erwin Manibusan, v Northern Mariana Islands, 22 December 2024
- Most goals by a opponent player in a match: 7: (2 times)
  - Chan Siu Ki, v Hong Kong, 7 March 2005
  - Kim Kwang-hyok, v North Korea, 11 March 2005
- Most goals by a opponent player in first half: 6: Chan Siu Ki, v Hong Kong, 7 March 2005
- Most goals by a opponent player in second half: 5: Qu Shengqing, v China, 26 January 2000
- Biggest win: 9: v Northern Mariana Islands, 1 April 2007
- Biggest defeat: 21: v North Korea, 11 March 2005
- Biggest win at the FIFA World Cup qualification: 5: v Bhutan, 11 June 2019
- Biggest defeat at the FIFA World Cup qualification: 19: v Iran, 26 November 2000
- Most goals by a team in a match: 9: v Northern Mariana Islands, 1 April 2007
- Most goals by a team at the FIFA World Cup qualification match: 5: v Bhutan, 11 June 2019
- Most goals by a team in first half: 3: v Northern Mariana Islands, 1 April 2007
- Most goals by a team in second half: 6: (2 times)
  - v Northern Mariana Islands, 1 April 2007
  - v Northern Mariana Islands, 22 December 2024
- Most goals conceded in a match: 21: v North Korea, 11 March 2005
- Most goals conceded at the FIFA World Cup qualification match: 19: v Iran, 26 November 2000
- Most goals conceded in first half: 12: v Hong Kong, 7 March 2005
- Most goals conceded in second half: 13: v China, 26 January 2000
- Most goals by both teams in a match: 21: v North Korea, 11 March 2005
- Most goals by both teams at the FIFA World Cup qualification match: 19: v Iran, 26 November 2000
- Most goals by both teams in first half: 12: v Hong Kong, 7 March 2005
- Most goals by both teams in second half: 13: v China, 26 January 2000
- Fewest goals by both teams in a match: 0: (4 times)
  - v Cambodia, 5 April 2006
  - v Macau, 21 July 2014
  - v Hong Kong, 19 November 2014
  - v Oman, 8 September 2015
- Fastest goals: 1st minutes: Josh Borja, v North Korea, 23 August 2009
- Fastest goals by a opponent: (3 times)
  - 1st minutes: Chu Wai Fung, v Taiwan, 10 August 1996
  - 1st miuutes: Phạm Như Thuần, v Vietnam, 23 January 2000
  - 1st minutes: Chan Wai Ho, v Hong Kong, 7 March 2005
- Fastest 2 goals to start the match: 8th minutes: v Mongolia, 23 June 2007
- Fastest 2 goals by a opponent to start the match: 2nd minutes: v Vietnam, 23 January 2000

== Competitive record ==
=== FIFA World Cup ===
FIFA World Cup									Qualification					
Year	Round	Position	Pld	W	D	L	F	A	Pld	W	D	L	F	A
(Uruguay) 1930	Not a FIFA member								Not a FIFA member					
(Italy) 1934	Not a FIFA member								Not a FIFA member					
(France) 1938	Not a FIFA member								Not a FIFA member					
(Brazil) 1950	Not a FIFA member								Not a FIFA member					
(Switzerland) 1954	Not a FIFA member								Not a FIFA member					
(Sweden) 1958	Not a FIFA member								Not a FIFA member					
(Chile) 1962	Not a FIFA member								Not a FIFA member					
(England) 1966	Not a FIFA member								Not a FIFA member					
(Mexico) 1970	Not a FIFA member								Not a FIFA member					
(West Germany) 1974	Not a FIFA member								Not a FIFA member					
(Argentina) 1978	Not a FIFA member								Not a FIFA member					
(Spain) 1982	Not a FIFA member								Not a FIFA member					
(Mexico) 1986	Not a FIFA member								Not a FIFA member					
(Italy) 1990	Not a FIFA member								Not a FIFA member					
(United States) 1994	Not a FIFA member								Not a FIFA member					
(France) 1998	Not a FIFA member								Not a FIFA member					
(South Korea) (Japan) 2002	Did not qualify								2	0	0	2	0	35
(Germany) 2006	Withdrew								Withdrew					
(South Africa) 2010	Withdrew								Withdrew					
(Brazil) 2014	Withdrew								Withdrew					
(Russia) 2018	Did not qualify								8	2	1	5	3	16
(Qatar) 2022	Did not qualify								10	1	0	9	7	33
(Canada) (Mexico) (United States) 2026	Did not qualify								2	0	0	2	1	3
(Morocco) (Portugal) (Spain) 2030	To be determined								To be determined					
(Saudi Arabia) 2034	To be determined								To be determined					
Total		0/4							22	3	1	18	11	87

=== AFC Asian Cup ===
AFC Asian Cup									Qualification record					
Year	Result	Position	Pld	W	D*	L	GS	GA	Pld	W	D*	L	GF	GA
(Hong Kong) 1956	Not a member of the AFC								Not a member of the AFC					
(South Korea) 1960	Not a member of the AFC								Not a member of the AFC					
(Israel) 1964	Not a member of the AFC								Not a member of the AFC					
(Iran) 1968	Not a member of the AFC								Not a member of the AFC					
(Thailand) 1972	Not a member of the AFC								Not a member of the AFC					
(Iran) 1976	Not a member of the AFC								Not a member of the AFC					
(Kuwait) 1980	Not a member of the AFC								Not a member of the AFC					
(Singapore) 1984	Not a member of the AFC								Not a member of the AFC					
(Qatar) 1988	Not a member of the AFC								Not a member of the AFC					
(Japan) 1992	Did not enter								Did not enter					
(United Arab Emirates) 1996	Did not qualify								3	0	0	3	2	27
(Lebanon) 2000	Did not qualify								3	0	0	3	0	32
(China) 2004	Did not qualify								2	0	0	2	0	11
(Indonesia) (Malaysia) (Thailand) (Vietnam) 2007	Did not enter								Did not enter					
(Qatar) 2011	Did not qualify								AFC Challenge Cup					
(Australia) 2015	Did not qualify								AFC Challenge Cup					
(United Arab Emirates) 2019	Withdrew during qualification								8	2	1	5	3	16
(Qatar) 2023	Did not qualify								12	1	0	11	8	36
(Saudi Arabia) 2027	Withdrew during qualification								2	0	0	2	1	3
Total	0/18	—							30	3	1	25	14	125

- 2019 – Withdrew from the third tournament due to financial constraints.

=== East Asian Football Championship ===
East Asian Football Championship record									Preliminary competition					
Year	Round	Position	Pld	W	D	L	GF	GA	Pld	W	D	L	GF	GA
East Asian Football Championship
(Japan) 2003	Did not qualify								4	0	0	4	0	22
(South Korea) 2005	Did not qualify								4	0	0	4	1	49
(China) 2008	Did not qualify								5	2	0	3	15	32
(Japan) 2010	Did not qualify								6	2	1	3	9	28
EAFF East Asian Cup
(South Korea) 2013	Did not qualify								6	2	1	3	8	18
(China) 2015	Did not qualify								6	3	2	1	10	6
EAFF E-1 Football Championship
(Japan) 2017	Did not qualify								3	0	0	3	2	7
(South Korea) 2019	Did not qualify								3	1	1	1	5	3
(Japan) 2022	Did not participate								Not held					
(South Korea) 2025	Did not qualify								2	1	0	1	2	6
Total	–	0/9	0	0	0	0	0	0	39	11	5	23	52	171

=== AFC Challenge Cup ===
AFC Challenge Cup record									Qualification record					
Year	Result	Position	Pld	W	D*	L	GF	GA	Pld	W	D	L	GF	GA
(Bangladesh) 2006	Group stage	16th	3	0	0	3	0	17	No qualification					
(India) 2008	Did not qualify								3	0	0	3	4	18
(Sri Lanka) 2010	Did not enter								Did not enter					
(Nepal) 2012	Did not enter								Did not enter					
(Maldives) 2014	Did not qualify								3	1	0	2	3	9
Total	Group stage	1/5	3	0	0	3	0	17	6	1	0	5	7	27

=== Pacific Games ===
Pacific Games record
Year	Round	Position	Pld	W	D	L	GF	GA
(Fiji) 1963	Did not enter							
(New Caledonia) 1966	Did not enter							
(Papua New Guinea) 1969	Did not enter							
(French Polynesia) 1971	Did not enter							
(Guam) 1975	Group stage	7th	2	0	0	2	1	16
(Fiji) 1979	Group stage	6th	5	2	0	3	13	25
(Samoa) 1983	Did not enter							
(New Caledonia) 1987	Did not enter							
(Papua New Guinea) 1991	Group stage	8th	4	0	0	3	1	52
(French Polynesia) 1995	Group stage	8th	3	0	0	3	0	23
(Fiji) 2003	Did not enter							
(Samoa) 2007	Did not enter							
(Fiji) 2011	Group stage	9th	5	1	1	3	4	21
(Papua New Guinea) 2015	N/A – tournament was U23							
(Samoa) 2019	Did not enter							
Total	Group stage	5/15	19	3	1	14	19	147

=== Pacific Mini Games ===
Pacific Mini Games record
Year	Round	Position	Pld	W	D*	L	GF	GA
(Solomon Islands) 1981	did not enter							
(Vanuatu) 1993	Group stage	8th	3	0	0	3	1	35
(Vanuatu) 2017	did not enter							
Total	Group Stage	1/3	3	0	0	3	1	35

=== Micronesian Games ===
Micronesian Games record
Year	Result	Position	Pld	W	D*	L	GS	GA
(Palau) 1998	Runners-up	2nd	6	5	0	1	52	7
(Pohnpei State) 2014	Did not enter							
(Yap State) 2018	Did not enter							
(Marshall Islands) 2024	Football was not part of the Games							
Total	Runners-up	1/3	6	5	0	1	43	5

== Head-to-head record ==
As of 6 June 2026

Opponent	First	Last	P	W	D	L	GF	GA	GD	Confederation
American Samoa	2011	2026	2	2	0	0	8	0	0	OFC
Aruba	2014	2014	2	0	1	1	2	4	–2	CONCACAF
Australia	2012	2012	1	0	0	1	0	9	–9	AFC
Bangladesh	2006	2006	1	0	0	1	0	3	–3	AFC
Bhutan	2003	2019	3	1	0	2	5	7	–2	AFC
Cambodia	2006	2021	4	1	0	3	3	6	–3	AFC
China	2000	2021	3	0	0	3	0	33	–33	AFC
Chinese Taipei	1996	2016	12	2	1	5	13	52	–39	AFC
Fiji	1975	1996	2	0	0	2	1	19	–18	OFC
Hong Kong	2003	2024	9	0	1	8	4	64	–60	AFC
India	2013	2015	3	1	0	2	2	6	–4	AFC
Iran	2000	2015	3	0	0	3	0	31	–31	AFC
North Korea	2005	2016	5	0	0	5	3	42	–39	AFC
South Korea	1996	1996	1	0	0	1	0	9	–9	AFC
Laos	2013	2013	1	0	1	0	1	1	0	AFC
Macau	2003	2024	7	3	2	2	10	7	3	AFC
Maldives	2019	2019	2	0	0	2	1	4	–3	AFC
Mongolia	2003	2018	7	2	1	4	7	17	–17	AFC
Myanmar	2013	2026	2	0	0	2	1	11	–10	AFC
New Caledonia	1979	2011	2	0	0	2	1	20	–19	OFC
Northern Mariana Islands	2007	2024	15	11	2	2	48	18	30	AFC
Oman	2015	2016	2	0	1	1	0	1	–1	AFC
Pakistan	2008	2008	1	0	0	1	2	9	–7	AFC
Palestine	2006	2006	1	0	0	1	0	11	–11	AFC
Papua New Guinea	1995	1995	1	0	0	1	0	9	–9	OFC
Philippines	2000	2026	6	0	0	6	2	18	–16	AFC
Puerto Rico	2026	2026	1	0	0	1	0	4	–4	CONCACAF
Singapore	2015	2023	3	0	1	2	3	5	–2	AFC
Solomon Islands	1975	2011	3	0	0	3	2	24	–22	OFC
Sri Lanka	2008	2008	1	0	0	1	1	5	–4	AFC
Syria	2019	2021	2	0	0	2	0	7	–7	AFC
Tahiti	1993	1993	1	0	0	1	0	11	–11	OFC
Tajikistan	2000	2000	1	0	0	1	0	16	–16	AFC
Turkmenistan	2015	2015	2	1	0	1	1	1	0	AFC
Vanuatu	1995	2011	2	0	0	2	0	2	–2	OFC
Vietnam	1996	2000	2	0	0	2	0	2	–20	AFC

== Honours ==
=== Regional ===
- Micronesian Games
  - (silver) Runners-up (1): 1998

=== Friendly ===
- Marianas Cup (3): 2007, 2008, 2009, 2010
- FIFA Series
  - (bronze) 3rd Place (1): 2026
