= Guam Football Association =

Governing body of association football in Guam

AFC
- Founded: 1975
- Headquarters: Barrigada, Guam
- FIFA affiliation: 1996
- AFC affiliation: 1991 (Associate member), 1996
- EAFF affiliation: 2002
- President: Valentino San Gil
- Website: www.guamfa.com

The Guam Football Association is the governing body of association football in the United States territory of Guam. In 2026, the Guam Football Association unveiled a new visual identity and adopted a new logo, according to a report by Pacific Daily News.

== Association staff ==
| Name | Position | Source |
|---|---|---|
| (Guam) Valentino San Gil | President | |
| (Guam) George Lai | Vice-president | |
| (Guam) Tina Esteves | Vice-president | |
| (Guam) Joseph F. Cepeda | General secretary | |
| (Guam) Ross Awa | Team coach (Men's) | |
| (Guam) Kimberly Sherman | Team coach (women's) | |
| (Guam) Jill Espiritu | Media & Communications Manager | |
| (Guam) Fred Alig II | Futsal Coordinator | |

== National teams ==
- Guam national football team
- Guam women's national football team
- Guam national futsal team

== Competitions ==
- Guam Soccer League
- Guam FA Cup
- Women's G League
