= Rovers FC (Guam) =

NAPA Rovers
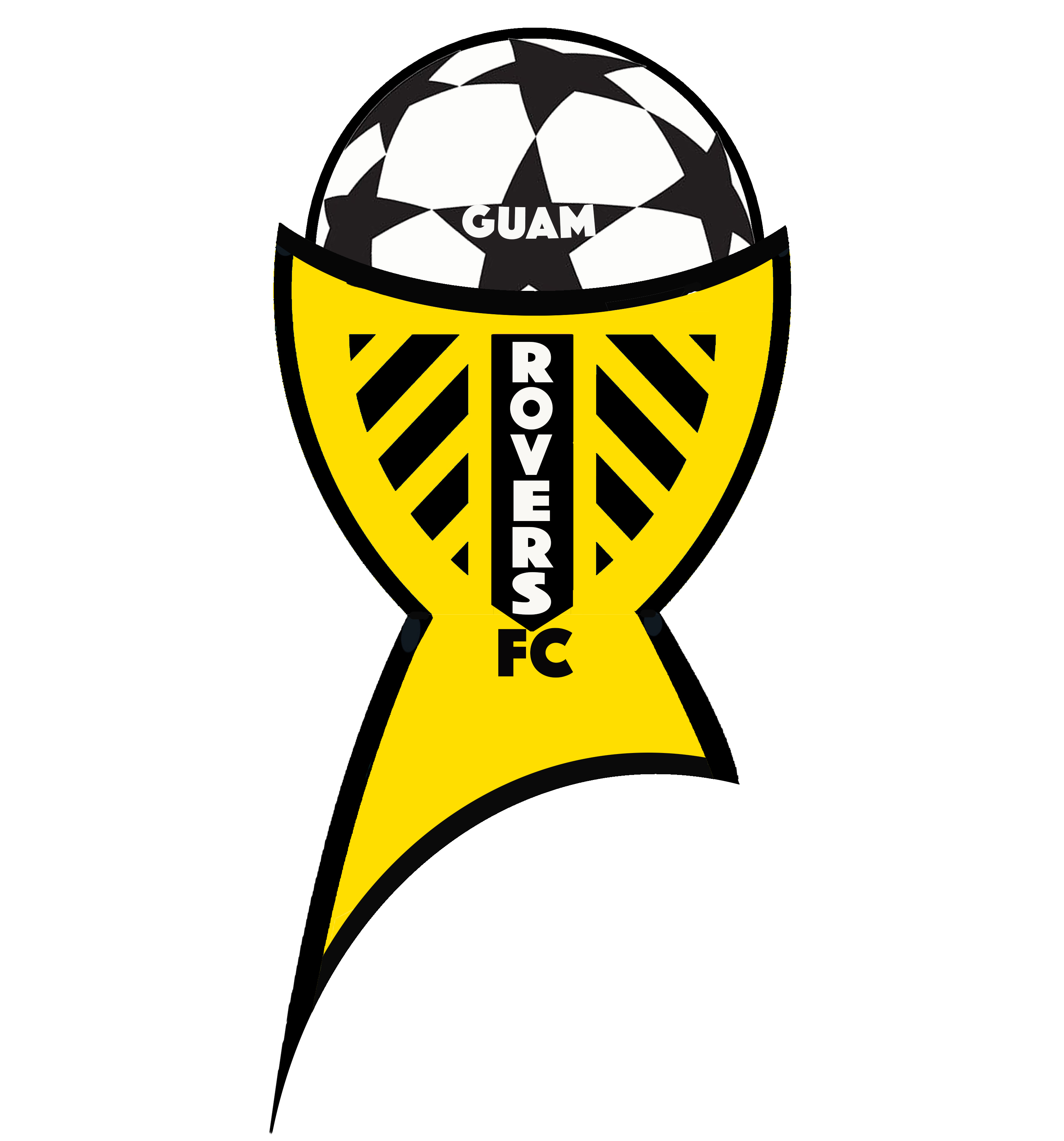
- Full name: NAPA Rovers Football Club
- Nickname: The Rovers
- Founded: 2009; 17 years ago
- Ground: Rovers Training Pitch "The Cage"
- President: Joel Sablan
- Manager: Jack Kido
- League: Guam Soccer League
- 2026: 2nd
- Website: www.guamroversfc.com
Home colours	Away colours

Rovers Football Club is a professional association football club based in Guam. Rovers FC senior team participates in the Guam Soccer League. Rovers FC has men's, women's and youth teams competing in various national divisions.

== History ==
Rovers Footbal Club (RFC) was founded in 2009 through the shared vision of four passionate amateur level footballers who committed to forming a competitive but social club. The masters (40+) team provided the foundation of the club with success in all championship finals from 2009–19. Numerous other fruitful tours resulted in travels to Saipan in the Northern Mariana Islands and Hong Kong. Plans for the club's growth were cultivated during the many trips abroad and bringing those plans back to Guam. In 2010, a RFC Division 2 team was established in the Guam Football Association Men's League, winning several championships. In 2013, the club decided to enter the top level on the island through the development of a Division 1 men's squad that went on to win several championships from 2014-2019. A Guam women's squad was incorporated into RFC and won the 2015 and 2016 championships.

In 2014 to provide a sustainable base of grassroots players, it was also decided to form the first Rovers Youth squad in the u6 division with a plan to expand into all divisions. In 2017, to grow this grass roots program the club developed a partnership and home field in association with St Johns School by adopting their field and accepting local students into the club. In 2019, Rovers FC became the second largest club on Guam (over 200 player members) with a team in every youth league and adult division.

In 2022, RFC acquired an abandoned tennis court and developed it with artificial turf, converting it into a mini-training pitch to use for all youth and adult club teams.

== Local competitions ==
The season for youth games held at Guam Football Association are usually spring (February to April) and fall (September to November). Rovers FC practices at St Johns School are held every Thursday 5pm-630pm and Sunday 8am-930am during the season. Offseason practices are held at Rovers Club mini pitch and are ongoing throughout the season. Mens, Women's and youth games schedule can be found on the Guam Football Association website.

Rovers FC D1 team secured a "double crown" by finishing as champions in their first year in the BGMSL and winning the Guam Football Association Cup in 2014. The Rovers FC D1 squad repeated as Division 1 champions again in 2015 securing the privilege to participate in regional AFC competitions such as the AFC President's Cup (AFC CL for “emerging nations”) and now in the AFC Cup Qualifying Playoffs which has replaced the AFC President's Cup (2016 AFC Cup). The club's rise mirrored national team success which has seen the Guam national team move from FIFA ranking 201 to 146 over the previous five years.

== International competitions ==
On many occasions Rovers FC has travelled to Hong Kong and Saipan with future plans to travel to the Philippines, Japan, Korea, Taiwan and other destinations. The Rovers FC also has plans to continue to springboard to new competitions in regional locations by becoming the very first club from Guam to take part in an official AFC Tournament, the AFC Cup Qualifying Play-offs. In the 2016 AFC Cup Qualifying Play-offs, Rovers FC competed against Dordoi Bishkek, the champions of Kyrgyzstan's premier league, and Benfica de Macau, the champions of Macau's premier league.

Rovers FC has a history of hosting various tournaments whereby clubs from foreign countries have traveled to Guam to compete. Club teams mostly from Japan and Saipan visit Guam to participate in these special weekend tournaments. There are plans on the horizon for these types of tournaments to become more frequent with visiting teams from Korea, China, Hong Kong, Taiwan and the Philippines as well as the teams from Japan and Saipan. Rovers FC have already acquired the reputation as an outstanding hosting club and will continue to elevate these events to bolster that reputation.

== Achievements ==
- Guam Soccer League

2013–14, 2014–15, 2015–16, 2016–17, 2017–18, 2018–19, 2025

- Guam FA Cup

2014, 2016

== Current squad ==
Note: Flags indicate national team as defined under FIFA eligibility rules; some limited exceptions apply. Players may hold more than one non-FIFA nationality.

No.	Pos.	Nation	Player
1	GK	USA	David Drews
3	DF	GUM	Bryan Torres
4	MF	COL	Gustavo Pro
5	DF	GUM	Ajay Pothen
6	MF	GUM	Darren Apiag
7	DF	YEM	Kazem Al Sulaiwi
8	MF	GUM	Bryan Cadiz
9	FW	GUM	Min Choi
10	MF	GUM	Mark Chargualaf (Captain)
11	FW	GUM	Matt Robles
12	DF	GUM	Ryan Quitigua

No.	Pos.	Nation	Player
14	FW	USA	Kayote Lawson
16	FW	GUM	Devan Mendiola
17	DF	GUM	Nathan Sablan
19	MF	CUB	Daniel Jurado
20	DF	GUM	Camden Aguon
21	DF	GUM	Jonah Sablan
23	MF	USA	Kelby Hernandez
24	MF	USA	Michael Crowley
25	DF	IRI	Mobin Rezaei
30	GK	GUM	JR Campos

== Club officials (board) ==
- Richard Hawes
- Joel Sablan
- Pedro Walls
- Saied Safa
- Craig Wade

== Continental history ==
Season	Competition	Round	Club	Home	Away	Position
2017	AFC Cup	Qualifying Round	(Kyrgyzstan) Dordoi Bishkek	0–2		3rd
2017	AFC Cup	Qualifying Round	Benfica de Macau	2–4		3rd
