= Guam Soccer League =

Budweiser G-League
- Organizing body: Guam Football Association (GFA)
- Founded: 1990; 36 years ago
- Country: Guam
- Confederation: AFC
- Divisions: 2
- Number of clubs: 15
- Level on pyramid: 1
- Domestic cup: Guam FA Cup
- International cup(s): AFC Challenge League; Marianas Club Championship
- Current champion(s): Wings (2nd title)
- Most championships: Guam Shipyard (9 titles)
- Top scorer: Marcus Lopez (225 goals)
- Broadcaster: FIFA+ (live streaming)
- Website: www.guamfa.com
- Current: 2026 Guam Soccer League

The Budweiser G-League or formerly Soccer League is the men's top level professional football league of the Guam Football Association in the United States territory of Guam. Previously, the then GSL was divided into Spring and Fall seasons. When the champions of both seasons were different, a one-off match was played to decide the year's overall champion.

== Clubs ==
There are currently 15 clubs competing in the 2024 league. Prior to the 2024 season, there was an amateur league that merged with the G League.

2024 Club	2022-23 Position	Top division titles	Most recent top division title
BOG Strykers	2nd	0	-
Beercelona	8th (Amateur)	0	-
Crushers FC	4th (Amateur)	0	-
Dededo SC	12th (Amateur)	0	-
Guam Shipyard	2nd	9	2006
Islanders FC	3rd	0	-
NAPA Rovers	6th	6	2018-19
Quality Distributors	4th	6	2012-13
Sidekicks SC	2nd (Amateur)	0	-
Southern Heat Omega	7th (Amateur)	0	-
Southern Cobras SC	5th (Amateur)	0	-
Tigers FC	Did not compete	0	-
Tumon Typhoons	Did not compete	0	-
UOG Tritons	1st (Amateur)	4	1993
Wings FC	1st	1	2022-23

== Previous champions ==
Champions were:

- 1990: University of Guam
- 1991: University of Guam
- 1992: University of Guam
- 1993: University of Guam
- 1994: Tumon Taivon (Tamuning)
- 1995: G-Force (Continental Micronesia)
- 1996: G-Force
- 1997: Tumon
- 1998 Overall: Anderson
  - 1998 Spring: Anderson
  - 1998 Fall: Island Cargo
- 1999 Overall: Coors Light Silver Bullets
  - 1999 Spring: Carpet One
  - 1999 Fall: Coors Light Silver Bullets
- 2000 Overall: Coors Light Silver Bullets
  - 2000 Spring: Coors Light Silver Bullets
  - 2000 Fall: Navy
- 2001 Overall: Staywell Zoom
  - 2001 Spring: Coors Light Silver Bullets
  - 2001 Fall : Staywell Zoom
- 2002 Overall: Guam Shipyard
  - 2002 Spring : Guam Shipyard
  - 2002 Fall: Guam Shipyard
- 2003 Overall: Guam Shipyard
  - 2003 Spring : Guam Shipyard
  - 2003 Fall: Guam Shipyard
- 2004 Overall: Guam U18
  - 2004 Spring : Guam U18
  - 2004 Fall: Guam U18
- 2005 Overall: Guam Shipyard
  - 2005 Spring: Guam Shipyard
  - 2005 Fall: Guam Shipyard
- 2006 Overall: Guam Shipyard
  - 2006 Spring: Guam Shipyard
  - 2006 Fall: Guam Shipyard
- 2007 Spring: Quality Distributors
- 2007–08: Quality Distributors
- 2008–09: Quality Distributors
- 2009–10: Quality Distributors
- 2010–11: Cars Plus
- 2011–12: Quality Distributors
- 2012–13: Quality Distributors
- 2013–14: Rovers
- 2014–15: Rovers
- 2015–16: Rovers
- 2016–17: Rovers
- 2017–18: Rovers
- 2018–19: Rovers
- 2019–20: Season cancelled due to COVID-19 pandemic in Guam
- 2020–22: No season
- 2022–23: Wings
- 2024: Wings
- 2025: Rovers

== Total championships ==
The number of league championships that clubs in Guam have attained.

Club	Number of Championships
Guam Shipyard (also as Staywell, Coors Light, G-Force)	9
Quality Distributors	6
Rovers	6
University of Guam	4
Tumon Soccer Club (also as Tumon Taivon)	2
Wings	2
Anderson Soccer Club	1
Guam U-18	1
Cars Plus	1

== Top goalscorers ==
Season	Player	Team	Goals
Fall 2006	(Guam) Eric Sotto	Under-17 National	32
Spring 2007	(Guam) Eric Sotto	Under-19 National	16
2007-08	Ashton Surber	NO KA OI	20
2008-09	(Guam) Min Sung Choi	Strykers	35
2009-10	(Guam) Min Sung Choi	Strykers	28
2009-10	Matthew Welton	Quality Distributors	28
2010-11	(Guam) Elias Merfalen	Cars Plus	15
2011-12	(Guam) Scott Spindel	Quality Distributors	32
2011-12	(Guam) Jason Cunliffe	Guam Shipyard	32
2012-13	(Guam) Scott Spindel	Quality Distributors	42
2013-14	Ashton Surber	Southern Cobras	32
2013-14	(Guam) Jason Cunliffe	Rovers	32
2014-15	(Guam) Ian Mariano	Rovers	32
2015-16	(Guam) Min Sung Choi	Guam Shipyard	41
2016-17	(Guam) Min Sung Choi	Guam Shipyard	32
2017-18	Ashton Surber	Islanders	38
2018-19	(Guam) Min Sung Choi	Rovers	36
2019-20	(Guam) Marcus Lopez	Strykers	27
2023	(Guam) Marcus Lopez	Strykers	16
2024	(Guam) Ivan Tcheugoue	Wings	37
2025	(Guam) Justin Cruz	Napa Rovers	49

Most time top goalscorer league

- 5 times
  - Min Sung Choi (2008-09, 2009-10, 2015-16, 2016-17 and 2018-19)

Most goals scored by a player in a single season

- 49 goals.
  - Justin Cruz (2025)

Most goals scored by a player in a single game

- 12 goals
  - Marcus Lopez (Strykers) 22-0 against Crushers (25 February 2024)

=== All-time goalscorers ===
Rank	Country	Player	Goals	Years
1	(Guam)	Marcus Lopez	225	2009
2	(Guam)	Min Sung Choi	223	2008
3	(Guam)	Scott Spindel	183	2009
4	(Guam)	Jason Cunliffe	153	2007
5	(Guam)	Ian Mariano	146	2007

== Multiple hat-tricks ==
Rank	Country	Player	Hat-tricks
1	(Guam)	Justin Cruz	13
2	(Guam)	Keyth Ordonez	9
2	(Guam)	Yvan Tcheugoue	9
4	(Guam)	Marcus Lopez	6
5	(Guam)	Brandon Auayan	5
5	(Guam)	George Martinez	5
7	(Guam)	Yaw Boateng	4
8	(Guam)	Seth Surber	3
8	(Guam)	Elder de Castro	3
8	(Guam)	Nathan Nuwer	3
8	(Guam)	Beau Perez	3
8	(Guam)	Nathan Toyes	3
8	(Guam)	Dan Weakley	3
Several players			2
Several players			1

== Women's League ==
=== Top goalscorers ===
Season	Player	Team	Goals
2014	Skyler Johnson	Doosan Crushers	19
2015 Spring	April Talledo	Quality Distribution	19
2015 Spring	Catherine Kendall	Lady	19
2015 Fall	Colleen Naden	Doosan Crushers	21
2016 Spring	Skyler Johnson	Crushers	15
2016 Fall	Colleen Naden	Crushers	13
2017 Spring	Colleen Naden	Crushers	21
2017 Fall	Jinae Terea	Bank of Guam	7
2018 Spring	Brianne Leon	Guam Shypard	12
2018-19	Alexandra Simasaki	Heat	9
2019-20	Colleen Naden	Tritons	19
2023	Colleen Naden	Shypard	10
2024	Taylor Camin	Heat	27
2024-25	Taylor Camin	Heavy HH	16
2025-26	Aubrey Ibanez	Haäzen Dazs	59

Most time goalscorers

- 5 times.
  - Colleen Naden (2015 Fall, 2016 Fall, 2017 Spring, 2019-20 and 2023).

Most goals by a player in a single season

- 59 goals.
  - Aubrey Ibanez (2025-26).
