= Quality Distributors =

- Full name: Quality Distributors Football Club
- Nicknames: Red, White and Blue
- Founded: 2001; 25 years ago
- Stadium: Guam National Training Facility
- Chairman: Aaron Mafnas
- Manager: John Perez
- League: Guam Soccer League
- 2026: 4th
Home colours	Away colours

Quality Distributors FC are a professional association football (soccer) club in Guam. They play in the Guam Soccer League. Their victory in the 2009–10 championship was achieved with a 100% score – played 20, won 20 matches.

== Honours ==
- Guam Men's Soccer League
  - Champions (5): 2007, 2007–08, 2008–09, 2009–10, 2011–12
- Guam FA Cup
  - Winners (4): 2008, 2009, 2011, 2012
