= Guam Shipyard =

Windward Wolverines
- Full name: Windward Wolverines Soccer Club
- Nicknames: The Blues; The Wolverines
- Founded: 1993; 33 years ago (as Guam Shipyard)
- Stadium: Guam National Football Stadium
- Capacity: 1,000
- Chairman: Kenneth Garrido
- Manager: Ewan Aguon
Home colours	Away colours

Windward Wolverines is a professional association football club that currently plays in the Guam Soccer League in the United States territory of Guam. The team have won three national cups and hold the record for the most league championships.

== Honours ==
- G-League
  - Champions (9): 1995, (Note: as Continental Micronesia G-Force.) 1996, 1999, (Note: as Coors Light Silver Bullets.) 2000, 2001, (Note: Fall league won as Staywell Zoom.) 2002, 2003, 2005, 2006
- Guam FA Cup
  - Champions (4): 2010, 2012, 2015, 2017
