= Bank of Guam Strykers FC =

Strykers
- Full name: Bank of Guam Strykers Football Club
- Nickname: The Strykers
- Founded: 2007; 19 years ago
- Stadium: GFA Center Upper Field
- Capacity: 1,000
- President: Keith Dickson
- Manager: Darren Quitugua
- League: Guam Soccer League
- 2026: 3rd
Home colours	Away colours

The Bank of Guam Strykers Football Club are a professional association football club based in Guam.

The club's youth team claimed victory in first Minetgot Cup Elite Youth League title and trophy. Aside from a football section, they have a successful beach soccer section which won the Land Shark Beach Soccer league in 2016. Its women's section took part in the AFC Women's Champions League.

== History ==
In 2005, Keith Dickson founded the club. In an interview with Pacific Daily News, he stated his reasons for starting the club were '[Other clubs they tried] were either too strict, or not strict enough'. The Strykers quickly became an important team in Guam, reaching the first division soon after being established. It now comprises over 16 teams engaging in different leagues of the Guam Football Association.

The Strykers are the first Guam club to play at the AFC Women's Champions League. They debuted in the preliminary round of the 2025–26 edition.

== Players (2023) ==
Note: Flags indicate national team as defined under FIFA eligibility rules; some limited exceptions apply. Players may hold more than one non-FIFA nationality.

No.	Pos.	Nation	Player
1	GK	USA	Nicky Butler
2	DF	GUM	Armand Sánchez
5	DF	GUM	Percy García
6	MF	TPE	Hong Tsu-huang
7	MF	GUM	Alan Thomas
8	DF	GUM	Luke Stewart
9	FW	GUM	Richard Advincula
10	FW	GUM	Nathan Fonseca
11	MF	GUM	Charles Davids
12	MF	GUM	Bob Santana

No.	Pos.	Nation	Player
13	DF	GUM	James Gallardo
14	FW	GUM	Anthony O'Brien
15	GK	GUM	Francis Peñaranda
17	FW	GUM	Alejandro Aguirre
18	MF	GUM	Moses Gambino
21	MF	GUM	Tyler Griffiths
23	MF	GUM	Séamus Kane
32	DF	GUM	Oliver González
99	FW	NAM	Shakes

== Women players (2023) ==
Note: Flags indicate national team as defined under FIFA eligibility rules; some limited exceptions apply. Players may hold more than one non-FIFA nationality.

No.	Pos.	Nation	Player
1	GK	GUM	Kalila Kim
2	DF	GUM	Sheena Borja
3	DF	GUM	Kiyoni Yamaguchi
4	DF	TPE	Hallie Wigsten
5	DF	GUM	Abigail San Gil
8	FW	GUM	Jenna Han
9	FW	GUM	Jinae Teria
10	MF	GUM	Koharu Minato
11	FW	GUM	Alexy Dacanay (Captain)
12	MF	GUM	Lauren Phillips
13	MF	GUM	Hannah Cruz

No.	Pos.	Nation	Player
14	FW	GUM	Christina Duenas (Vice-Captain)
15	DF	GUM	Ramona Nelson
17	DF	USA	Erica Alejandro
18	MF	GUM	Franceska Pangelinan
19	FW	GUM	Taylor Paige Aguon
22	GK	GUM	Amy Besagar
23	MF	GUM	Ashley Besagar
24	DF	GUM	Sabrina Kenney
25	DF	GUM	Isabella Bass
55	DF	GUM	Richelle Ragadio

== Honors ==
- Guam FA Cup
  - Runners-up (1): 2015
