= 2013 EAFF East Asian Cup Preliminary Competition Round 2 squads =

Below are the squads for the 2013 EAFF East Asian Cup Preliminary Competition Round 2 in Hong Kong.

== Australia ==
Head coach: (Germany) Holger Osieck

No.	Pos.	Player	Date of birth (age)	Caps	Goals	Club
1	GK	Eugene Galeković	12 June 1981 (aged 31)	4	0	(Australia) Adelaide United
2	DF	Michael Marrone	27 January 1987 (aged 25)	0	0	(Australia) Melbourne Heart
3	DF	Aziz Behich	16 December 1990 (aged 21)	1	1	(Australia) Melbourne Heart
4	DF	Robert Cornthwaite	24 October 1985 (aged 27)	2	1	(South Korea) Chunnam Dragons
5	DF	Michael Thwaite	2 May 1983 (aged 29)	7	0	(Australia) Perth Glory
6	DF	Dino Djulbic	16 February 1983 (aged 29)	0	0	(China) Guizhou Renhe
7	MF	Brett Emerton	22 February 1979 (aged 33)	92	19	(Australia) Sydney FC
9	FW	Eli Babalj	21 February 1992 (aged 20)	1	0	(Serbia) Red Star Belgrade
10	FW	Archie Thompson	23 October 1978 (aged 34)	42	24	(Australia) Melbourne Victory
11	MF	Mark Milligan	4 August 1985 (aged 27)	15	1	(Australia) Melbourne Victory
17	MF	Matt McKay	11 January 1983 (aged 29)	29	1	(South Korea) Busan IPark
18	GK	Mathew Ryan	8 April 1992 (aged 20)	0	0	(Australia) Central Coast Mariners
20	MF	Tom Rogić	16 December 1992 (aged 19)	1	0	(Australia) Central Coast Mariners
21	MF	Richard Garcia	4 September 1981 (aged 31)	14	0	(Australia) Melbourne Heart
24	DF	Ivan Franjic	10 September 1987 (aged 25)	0	0	(Australia) Brisbane Roar
25	DF	Matt Smith	14 October 1982 (aged 30)	0	0	(Australia) Brisbane Roar
27	MF	Aaron Mooy	15 September 1990 (aged 22)	0	0	(Australia) Western Sydney Wanderers
28	MF	Terry Antonis	26 November 1993 (aged 19)	0	0	(Australia) Sydney FC
29	DF	Scott Jamieson	13 October 1988 (aged 24)	2	0	(Australia) Perth Glory
30	FW	Adam Taggart	2 June 1993 (aged 19)	0	0	(Australia) Newcastle Jets

== Chinese Taipei ==
Head coach: (Taiwan) Chiang Mu-Tsai

No.	Pos.	Player	Date of birth (age)	Caps	Goals	Club
2	DF	Wei Pei-Lun	28 February 1990 (aged 22)	0	0	(Taiwan) National Sports Training Center Football Team
3	DF	Lin Cheng-Yi	30 September 1987 (aged 25)	2	0	Taiwan Power Company F.C.
4	DF	Wu Pai-Ho	29 November 1987 (aged 25)	2	0	(Taiwan) Tatung F.C.
5	MF	Tsai Hsien-Tang	29 April 1977 (aged 35)	0	0	(Taiwan) Tatung F.C.
7	FW	Chang Han	25 December 1985 (aged 26)	21	9	(Taiwan) Tatung F.C.
9	MF	Lo Chih-An	28 December 1988 (aged 23)	14	2	(Taiwan) Tatung F.C.
10	FW	Chen Hao-Wei	30 April 1991 (aged 21)	3	0	(China) Beijing Baxy F.C.
11	FW	Chen Po-Hao	10 February 1989 (aged 23)	0	0	(Taiwan) Tatung F.C.
12	FW	Lo Chih-En	28 December 1988 (aged 23)	12	7	(Taiwan) Tatung F.C.
13	DF	Chen Yi-Hung	30 October 1989 (aged 23)	0	0	(Taiwan) Tatung F.C.
16	DF	Yang Chao-Hsun	18 October 1987 (aged 25)	0	0	(Taiwan) Tainan City F.C.
17	MF	Chen Po-Liang	11 February 1988 (aged 24)	18	8	(China) Shenzhen Ruby F.C.
18	GK	Lu Kun-Chi	6 February 1985 (aged 27)	23	0	Taiwan Power Company F.C.
19	FW	He Ming-Chan	12 May 1983 (aged 29)	0	0	Taiwan Power Company F.C.
22	GK	Pan Wen-Chieeh	29 June 1991 (aged 21)	2	0	(Taiwan) Tatung F.C.
24	DF	Huang Wei-Min	16 August 1988 (aged 24)	0	0	Taiwan Power Company F.C.
25	MF	Hsu Che-Hao		0	0	(Taiwan) Tatung F.C.
26	MF	Chan Che-Yuan	23 October 1989 (aged 23)	9	0	(Taiwan) National Sports Training Center Football Team
30	DF	Chiang Ming-Han	6 October 1986 (aged 26)	8	0	(Taiwan) National Sports Training Center Football Team
32	MF	Wen Chih-Hao	25 March 1992 (aged 20)	0	0	Taiwan Power Company F.C.

== Guam ==
Head coach: (England) Gary White

No.	Pos.	Player	Date of birth (age)	Caps	Goals	Club
1	GK	Doug Herrick	2 June 1989 (aged 23)	4	0	(United States) Seattle Sounders FC U-23
2	DF	Shawn Nicklaw	15 April 1989 (aged 23)	0	0	(Denmark) HB Køge
3	MF	Scott Leon Guerrero	22 August 1990 (aged 22)	17	0	(United States) Loyola Marymount University
4	DF	Jonahan Romero	17 March 1988 (aged 24)	6	2	(Philippines) Kaya
5	DF	Micah Paulino	16 November 1992 (aged 20)	14	0	(United States) Niagara University
6	MF	Travis Nicklaw	21 December 1993 (aged 18)	0	0	(United States) San Diego State University
7	FW	Zachary DeVille	23 March 1993 (aged 19)	5	2	(United States) Northridge Matadors
8	DF	Ian Mariano	7 October 1990 (aged 22)	21	1	(United States) Monterray
9	MF	Josh Borja	1 August 1990 (aged 22)	12	5	Guam Shipyard
10	MF	Jason Cunliffe	23 October 1983 (aged 29)	18	9	(Philippines) Pachanga
11	MF	Dylan Naputi	4 January 1995 (aged 17)	11	2	(Guam) Quality Distributors
12	FW	Christian Schweizer	6 January 1995 (aged 17)	5	0	(Guam) Fuji-Ichiban Espada
13	MF	Ryan Guy	5 September 1985 (aged 27)	3	0	(United States) New England Revolution
14	MF	Marcus Lopez	9 February 1992 (aged 20)	5	3	Guam Shipyard
15	MF	Ian Adamos	3 April 1988 (aged 24)	6	1	(Guam) SoCal Elite
16	DF	Mark Chargualaf	3 January 1991 (aged 21)	20	0	(Guam) Cars Plus
17	MF	Thaddeus Atalig		2	0	(Guam) Fuji-Ichiban Espada
19	MF	Dominic Gadia				
20	FW	Elias Merfalen	7 September 1989 (aged 23)	15	1	(Guam) Cars Plus
22	GK	Dallas Jaye	19 June 1993 (aged 19)	3	0	(United States) University of South Florida

== Hong Kong ==
Head coach: (South Korea) Kim Pan-Gon

No.	Pos.	Player	Date of birth (age)	Caps	Goals	Club
1	GK	Yapp Hung Fai	21 March 1990 (aged 22)	16	0	(Hong Kong) South China
2	DF	Lee Chi Ho	16 November 1982 (aged 30)	41	0	(Hong Kong) South China
3	DF	Cheung Kin Fung	1 January 1984 (aged 28)	14	0	(Hong Kong) Sunray Cave JC Sun Hei
4	MF	Bai He	19 November 1983 (aged 29)	15	0	(Hong Kong) South China
6	MF	Huang Yang	1 October 1983 (aged 29)	6	0	(Hong Kong) Kitchee
7	FW	Chan Siu Ki	14 July 1985 (aged 27)	41	32	(China) Guangdong Sunray Cave
8	FW	Lee Hong Lim	29 September 1983 (aged 29)	17	3	(Hong Kong) South China
9	FW	Lee Wai Lim	5 May 1981 (aged 31)	19	5	(Hong Kong) South China
11	FW	Lam Hok Hei	18 September 1991 (aged 21)	6	2	(Hong Kong) Biu Chun Rangers
12	DF	Lo Kwan Yee	9 October 1984 (aged 28)	27	6	(Hong Kong) Kitchee
14	FW	Cheng Siu Wai	27 December 1981 (aged 30)	13	7	(Hong Kong) Kitchee
15	DF	Chan Wai Ho	24 April 1982 (aged 30)	50	4	(Hong Kong) South China
17	DF	Chiu Chun Kit	4 October 1983 (aged 29)	1	0	(Hong Kong) Citizen
18	GK	Tse Tak Him	10 February 1985 (aged 27)	9	0	(Hong Kong) Citizen
21	DF	Kwok Kin Pong	30 March 1987 (aged 25)	16	1	(Hong Kong) South China
22	MF	Chan Man Fai	19 June 1988 (aged 24)	6	2	(Hong Kong) Kitchee
23	MF	Chu Siu Kei	11 January 1980 (aged 32)	38	4	(Hong Kong) Kitchee
25	FW	Jaimes McKee	14 April 1987 (aged 25)	1	0	(Hong Kong) Sun Pegasus
26	MF	Michael Luk	22 August 1986 (aged 26)	1	0	(Hong Kong) South China
30	GK	Wang Zhenpeng	5 May 1984 (aged 28)	0	0	(Hong Kong) Kitchee

== North Korea ==
Head coach: (North Korea) Yun Jong-Su

No.	Pos.	Player	Date of birth (age)	Caps	Goals	Club
1	GK	Ri Myong-Guk	9 September 1986 (aged 26)	48	0	(North Korea) Pyongyang City
2	DF	Ri Hyong-Mu	4 November 1991 (aged 21)	1	0	(North Korea) Sobaeksu
3	DF	Pak Hyon-Il	21 November 1993 (aged 19)	0	0	
4	MF	Pak Nam-Chol I	2 July 1985 (aged 27)	60	9	(Thailand) Muangthong United
5	MF	Ri Myong-Jun	30 November 1990 (aged 22)	5	2	(Thailand) Muangthong United
6	DF	Kang Kuk-Chol	1 July 1990 (aged 22)	2	0	(North Korea) Pyongyang City
7	FW	Pak Kwang-Ryong	27 September 1992 (aged 20)	12	3	(Switzerland) Basel
8	MF	Ryang Yong-Gi	7 January 1982 (aged 30)	15	2	(Japan) Vegalta Sendai
9	MF	Pak Song-Chol	24 September 1987 (aged 25)	28	8	(North Korea) Rimyongsu
10	FW	So Tae-Song	21 October 1993 (aged 19)	0	0	
11	MF	Jong Il-Gwan	30 October 1992 (aged 20)	15	2	(North Korea) Rimyongsu
12	DF	Jon Kwang-Ik	4 May 1988 (aged 24)	30	1	(North Korea) Pyongyang City
13	MF	Choe Myong-Ho	3 July 1988 (aged 24)	30	1	(North Korea) Kyonggongop
14	DF	Pak Nam-Chol II	3 October 1988 (aged 24)	30	0	(North Korea) Amrokgang
15	MF	An Il-Bom	2 December 1990 (aged 21)	2	0	
16	DF	Ro Hak-Su	19 January 1990 (aged 22)	0	0	
17	MF	An Yong-Hak	25 October 1978 (aged 34)	36	2	(Japan) Kashiwa Reysol
18	GK	Ju Kwang-Min	20 May 1990 (aged 22)	14	0	(North Korea) Kigwancha
19	MF	Hong Kim-Song	3 June 1990 (aged 22)	0	0	
20	DF	Ri Kwang-Hyok	17 April 1987 (aged 25)	30	1	(North Korea) Kyonggongop
21	MF	Ri Il-Jin	20 August 1993 (aged 19)	0	0	(North Korea) Sobaeksu
22	DF	Jang Song-Hyok	18 January 1991 (aged 21)	10	2	(North Korea) Rimyongsu
23	GK	Ri Kwang-Il	13 April 1988 (aged 24)	0	0	(North Korea) Sobaeksu
24	DF	Jang Kuk-Chol	16 February 1994 (aged 18)	7	2	(North Korea) Rimyongsu
25	MF	Ri Hyong-Ju		0	0	
