= 2012–13 in Hong Kong football =

Football in Hong Kong
- Season: 2012–13

Men's football
- First Division: South China
- Second Division: Yuen Long
- Third Division: Wong Tai Sin
- Fourth Division: Yau Tsim Mong
- FA Cup: Kitchee
- Senior Shield: Wofoo Tai Po
- season play-off: Kitchee

The 2012–13 season is the 111th season of competitive football in Hong Kong, starting in July 2012 and ending in June 2013.

== Promotion and relegation ==
Team relegated from First Division League

- Hong Kong Sapling (folded)
- Sham Shui Po

Team promoted to First Division League

- Kam Fung
- Southern District

Team relegated from Second Division League

- Kwun Tong
- Kwai Tsing

Team promoted to Second Division League

- Eastern
- Tuen Mun FC

Team relegated from Third Division League

Third A Division League

- Sai Kung Friends
- Ornament
- Solon
- Lung Moon
- Tung Sing
- Sun Source
- Blake Garden
- Kwong Wah
- St. Joseph's

Third District Division League

- Central & Western District
- Sai Kung
- Yau Tsim Mong
- Northern District

== Honours ==
=== Trophy and league champions ===
Competition	Winner	Details	At	Match report
Senior Shield	Wofoo Tai Po	2012–13 Hong Kong Senior Shield beat Citizen 5–3 on penalties (2–2 after extra time)	Hong Kong Stadium	Report
FA Cup	Kitchee	2012–13 Hong Kong FA Cup beat Sun Pegasus 1–0	Hong Kong Stadium	Report
First Division	South China	2012–13 Hong Kong First Division League	Hong Kong Stadium	Report
Second Division	Yuen Long	2012–13 Hong Kong Second Division League beat Shatin 3–0	Yuen Long Stadium	Report
Third Division	Wong Tai Sin	2012–13 Hong Kong Third Division League beat New Fair Kuitan 2–1	Kwong Fuk Park	Report
Fourth Division	Yau Tsim Mong	2012–13 Hong Kong Fourth Division League beat Central & Western 2–0	Causeway Bay Sports Ground	Report
Junior Shield	Yuen Long	2012–13 Hong Kong Junior Shield beat Kwai Tsing 6–2	Hong Kong Stadium	Report

=== Promotion winners ===
Competition	Winner	Details
Second Division	Happy Valley	2nd in Second Division
Second Division	Eastern Salon	3rd in Second Division
Third Division	Lucky Mile	2nd in Third Division
Third Division	Kwun Tong	3rd in Third Division
Third Division	Kwai Tsing	4th in Third Division
Fourth Division	Mutual	2nd in Fourth Division
Fourth Division	Kwong Wah	3rd in Fourth Division
Fourth Division	Sun Source	4th in Fourth Division

=== Playoffs winners ===
Competition	Winner	Details
Hong Kong season play-offs	Kitchee	2012–13 Hong Kong season play-off beat Tuen Mun 3–0

== Representative team ==
=== Hong Kong ===
==== 2013 EAFF East Asian Cup qualification ====
The qualification stage (semi-final competition) of the 2013 EAFF East Asian Cup will be held from 1 December to 9 December 2012 in Hong Kong. Hong Kong will play against Australia, Chinese Taipei, Guam and North Korea. Winner of the group qualifies and advances to the final competition held in South Korea.

Team	Pld	W	D	L	GF	GA	GD	Pts
Australia	4	3	1	0	19	1	+18	10
North Korea	4	3	1	0	16	2	+14	10
Hong Kong (H)	4	2	0	2	4	6	−2	6
Chinese Taipei	4	0	1	3	2	17	−15	1
Guam	4	0	1	3	2	17	−15	1

(H) Hosts

1 December 2012 Matchday 1	Guam	1 – 2	Hong Kong	Mong Kok, Hong Kong
14:30 (GMT+8)	Guerrero (yellow card) 54'; Merfalen 56'; Nicklaw (yellow card) 90'	Report	2', 17' Chan Siu Ki; (yellow card) 55' Michael Luk; (yellow card) 85' Lee Wai Lim	Stadium: Mong Kok Stadium (Capacity: 6,680); Attendance: 3,040; Referee: Kim Dae Yong (Korea Republic); Assistant referees: Anuwat Feenuachang (Thailand), Sumate Saiwaew (Thailand); Fourth official: Mongkolchai Pechsri (Thailand)

Match detail

Guam	Hong Kong

GUAM:
GK	1	Doug Herrick
RB	3	Scott Leon Guerrero	(yellow card) 54'
CB	6	Travis Nicklaw	(yellow card) 90'
CB	5	Micah Paulino
LB	4	Jonahan Romero
DM	2	Shawn Nicklaw
DM	13	Ryan Guy
RM	15	Ian Adamos		(substituted off) 55'
AM	10	Jason Cunliffe (c)
LM	7	Zachary DeVille		(substituted off) 27'
CF	20	Elias Merfalen		(substituted off) 77'
Substitutes:
GK	22	Dallas Jaye
MF	8	Ian Mariano
DF	9	Josh Borja
FW	11	Dylan Naputi		(substituted on) 55'
DF	12	Christian Schweizer		(substituted on) 27'
FW	14	Marcus Lopez		(substituted on) 77'
DF	16	Mark Chargualaf
MF	17	Thaddeus Atalig
DF	19	Dominic Gadia
Coach:
(England) Gary White

HONG KONG:
GK	1	Yapp Hung Fai
RB	12	Lo Kwan Yee
CB	2	Lee Chi Ho
CB	15	Chan Wai Ho (c)
LB	13	Cheung Kin Fung
DM	6	Huang Yang
DM	26	Michael Luk	(yellow card) 54'	(substituted off) 63'
RM	11	Lam Hok Hei
LM	8	Lee Hong Lim		(substituted off) 63'
CF	25	Jaimes McKee
ST	7	Chan Siu Ki		(substituted off) 78'
Substitutions:
GK	18	Tse Tak Him
GK	30	Wang Zhenpeng
MF	4	Bai He
MF	9	Lee Wai Lim	(yellow card) 84'	(substituted on) 63'
FW	14	Cheng Siu Wai		(substituted on) 78'
DF	17	Chiu Chun Kit
DF	21	Kwok Kin Pong
FW	22	Chan Man Fai
MF	23	Chu Siu Kei		(substituted on) 63'
Manager:
(South Korea) Kim Pan-Gon

3 December 2012 Matchday 2	Hong Kong	0 – 1	Australia	Mong Kok, Hong Kong
20:30 (GMT+8)	Chu Siu Kei (yellow card) 12'; Chan Siu Ki (yellow card) 52'; Lam Hok Hei (yellow card) 88' (yellow-red card) 90'	Report	(yellow card) 26' Behich; (yellow card) 52' (goal) 85' Emerton	Stadium: Mong Kok Stadium (Capacity: 6,680); Attendance: 4,160; Referee: Jumpei Iida (Japan); Assistant referees: Lee Hung Ping (Chinese Taipei), Musi Ala (China PR); Fourth official: Kim Dae Yong (Korea Republic)

Match detail

Hong Kong	Australia

HONG KONG:
GK	1	Yapp Hung Fai
RB	12	Lo Kwan Yee
CB	2	Lee Chi Ho
CB	15	Chan Wai Ho (c)
LB	21	Kwok Kin Pong
DM	6	Huang Yang
DM	4	Bai He
RM	9	Lee Wai Lim		(substituted off) 82'
AM	23	Chu Siu Kei	(yellow card) 12'
LM	25	Jaimes McKee		(substituted off) 88'
CF	22	Chan Man Fai		(substituted off) 46'
Substitutions:
GK	18	Tse Tak Him
GK	30	Wang Zhenpeng
FW	7	Chan Siu Ki	(yellow card) 52'	(substituted on) 46'
MF	8	Lee Hong Lim		(substituted on) 82'
FW	11	Lam Hok Hei	(yellow card) 88' (yellow-red card) 90'	(substituted on) 88'
DF	13	Cheung Kin Fung
FW	14	Cheng Siu Wai
DF	17	Chiu Chun Kit
MF	26	Michael Luk
Manager:
(South Korea) Kim Pan-Gon

AUSTRALIA:
GK	1	Eugene Galeković
RB	24	Ivan Franjic
CB	25	Matt Smith
CB	13	Robert Cornthwaite
LB	3	Aziz Behich	(yellow card) 26'
DM	6	Mark Milligan
DM	5	Michael Thwaite
RM	21	Richard Garcia		(substituted off) 81'
AM	7	Brett Emerton (c)	(yellow card) 52'	(substituted off) 90'
LM	17	Matt McKay
CF	10	Archie Thompson		(substituted off) 70'
Substitutes:
GK	18	Mathew Ryan
DF	2	Michael Marrone
DF	4	Dino Djulbic
FW	9	Eli Babalj
MF	20	Tom Rogić		(substituted on) 81'
MF	26	Terry Antonis		(substituted on) 90'
MF	27	Aaron Mooy
FW	30	Adam Taggart		(substituted on) 70'
DF	33	Scott Jamieson
Coach:
(Germany) Holger Osieck

7 December 2012 Matchday 4	Hong Kong	2 – 0	Chinese Taipei	So Kon Po, Hong Kong
20:30 (GMT+8)	Chan Wai Ho 24'; Lee Hong Lim 25'; Cheng Siu Wai (yellow card) 72'	Report	(yellow card) 23' Yang Chao-hsun; (yellow card) 47' Lin Cheng-yi	Stadium: Hong Kong Stadium (Capacity: 40,000); Attendance: 2,315; Referee: Jumpei Iida (Japan); Assistant referees: Musi Ala (China PR), Anuwat Feenuachang (Thailand); Fourth official: Kim Dae-Yong (Korea Republic)

Match detail

Hong Kong	Chinese Taipei

HONG KONG:
GK	1	Yapp Hung Fai
RB	12	Lo Kwan Yee		(substituted off) 73'
CB	2	Lee Chi Ho		(substituted off) 46'
CB	15	Chan Wai Ho (c)
LB	13	Cheung Kin Fung
DM	4	Bai He
DM	26	Michael Luk
AM	23	Chu Siu Kei
RW	25	Jaimes McKee		(substituted off) 46'
LW	8	Lee Hong Lim
CF	7	Chan Siu Ki
Substitutions:
GK	18	Tse Tak Him
GK	30	Wang Zhenpeng
MF	6	Huang Yang		(substituted on) 46'
MF	9	Lee Wai Lim
FW	14	Cheng Siu Wai	(yellow card) 72'	(substituted on) 46'
DF	17	Chiu Chun Kit
DF	21	Kwok Kin Pong		(substituted on) 73'
Manager:
(South Korea) Kim Pan-Gon

CHINESE TAIPEI:
GK	22	Pan Wen-chie
RB	16	Yang Chao-hsun	(yellow card) 23'
CB	4	Wu Pai-ho
CB	3	Lin Cheng-yi	(yellow card) 47'
LB	30	Chiang Ming-han		(substituted off) 61'
DM	5	Tsai Hsien-tang		(substituted off) 70'
DM	9	Lo Chih-an
RM	12	Lo Chih-en
AM	17	Chen Po-liang (c)
LM	25	Hsu Che-hao
CF	10	Chen Hao-wei
Substitutes:
GK	18	Lu Kun-chi
DF	2	Wei Pei-lune
FW	7	Chang Han
FW	11	Chen Po-hao		(substituted on) 61'
DF	13	Chen Yi-hung
FW	19	He Ming-chan
DF	24	Huang Wei-min		(substituted on) 70'
MF	32	Wen Chih-haot
Coach:
(Taiwan) Chiang Mu-Tsai

9 December 2012 Matchday 4	Hong Kong	0 – 4	North Korea	So Kon Po, Hong Kong
14:20 (GMT+8)	Chan Siu Ki (yellow card) 68'; Lee Chi Ho (yellow card) 74'; Michael Luk (yellow card) 90'	Report	27' Pak Nam-Chol II; 33' Ryang Yong-Gi; 36' Pak Nam-Chol I (yellow card) 80' Jong Il-Gwan; 85' Pak Song-Chol	Stadium: Hong Kong Stadium (Capacity: 40,000); Attendance: 3,345; Referee: Yao Qing (China); Assistant referees: Lee Hung Ping (Chinese Taipei), Sumate Saiwaew (Thailand); Fourth official: Wang Zhe (China)

Match detail

Hong Kong	North Korea

HONG KONG:
GK	1	Yapp Hung Fai
RB	12	Lo Kwan Yee		(substituted off) 58'
CB	2	Lee Chi Ho	(yellow card) 74'
CB	15	Chan Wai Ho (c)
LB	21	Kwok Kin Pong
DM	6	Huang Yang
DM	4	Bai He
RM	9	Lee Wai Lim
AM	23	Chu Siu Kei		(substituted off) 73'
LM	8	Lee Hong Lim		(substituted off) 46'
CF	25	Jaimes McKee
Substitutions:
GK	18	Tse Tak Him
GK	30	Wang Zhenpeng
FW	7	Chan Siu Ki	(yellow card) 68'	(substituted on) 46'
FW	11	Lam Hok Hei
DF	13	Cheung Kin Fung		(substituted on) 58'
FW	14	Cheng Siu Wai
DF	17	Chiu Chun Kit
MF	26	Michael Luk	(yellow card) 90'	(substituted on) 73'
Manager:
(South Korea) Kim Pan-Gon

NORTH KOREA:
GK	1	Ri Myong-Guk (c)
RB	12	Jon Kwang-Ik
CB	20	Ri Kwang-Hyok
CB	14	Pak Nam-Chol II
LB	6	Kang Kuk-Chol
DM	17	An Yong-Hak
DM	9	Pak Song-Chol
RM	11	Jong Il-Gwan	(yellow card) 80'	(substituted off) 86'
LM	8	Ryang Yong-Gi
CF	4	Pak Nam-Chol I
CF	15	An Il-Bom		(substituted off) 57'
Substitutes:
GK	18	Ju Kwang-Min
DF	2	Ri Hyong-Mu
FW	3	Pak Hyon-Il
MF	5	Ri Myong-Jun		(substituted on) 57'	(substituted off) 86'
FW	10	So Tae-Song
MF	13	Choe Myong-Ho		(substituted on) 86'
DF	16	Ro Hak-Su
MF	19	Hong Kim-Song		(substituted on) 86'
Coach:
(North Korea) Yun Jong-Su

==== 2015 AFC Asian Cup qualification ====
The draw for the group stage of qualification was held in Australia on 9 October 2012. Hong Kong was drawn with Uzbekistan, United Arab Emirates and Vietnam. Hong Kong will start their 2015 Asian Cup qualifying campaign in February 2013.

Team	Pld	W	D	L	GF	GA	GD	Pts
United Arab Emirates	6	5	1	0	18	3	+15	16
Uzbekistan	6	3	2	1	10	4	+6	11
Hong Kong	6	1	1	4	2	13	−11	4
Vietnam	6	1	0	5	5	15	−10	3

6 February 2013 Matchday 1	Uzbekistan	0 – 0	Hong Kong	Tashkent, Uzbekistan
16:00 (GMT+5)		Report		Stadium: Pakhtakor Stadium (Capacity:35,000); Attendance: 16,287; Referee: Ali Abdulnabi (Bahrain); Assistant referees: Yaser Khalil Ebrahim Abdulla Tulefat (Bahrain), Ebrahim Moosa Saleh (Bahrain); Fourth official: Jameel Juma Abdulhusain Mohamed (Bahrain)

Match detail

Uzbekistan	Hong Kong

SINGAPORE:
GK	12	Ignatiy Nesterov
RB	23	Akmal Shorakhmedov
CB	5	Islom Inomov
CB	4	Artyom Filiposyan
LB	22	Shohruh Gadoev		(substituted off) 75'
DM	7	Azizbek Haydarov
CM	8	Server Djeparov	(c)	(substituted off) 82'
CM	18	Timur Kapadze		(substituted off) 44'
AM	9	Odil Ahmedov
LM	6	Jasur Hasanov
ST	10	Ulugbek Bakayev
Substitutes:
GK	1	Murod Zukhurov
GK	21	Sardor Kobuldjanov
DF	2	Davronbek Khashimov
DF	3	Shavkat Mullajanov
MF	11	Marat Bikmaev		(substituted on) 82'
FW	13	Alibobo Rakhmatullaev
MF	14	Stanislav Andreev
FW	15	Aleksandr Geynrikh		(substituted on) 44'
DF	16	Fozil Musaev
MF	17	Sanzhar Tursunov		(substituted on) 75'
DF	19	Islom Inomov
DF	20	Islom Tukhtakhodjaev
Coach:
Mirjalol Qosimov (Uzbekistan)

HONG KONG:
GK	1	Yapp Hung Fai	(yellow card) 60'
RB	12	Lo Kwan Yee	(red card) 58'
CB	15	Chan Wai Ho		(c)
CB	2	Lee Chi Ho
LB	13	Cheung Kin Fung
DM	4	Bai He	(yellow card) 90+1'
DM	3	Man Pei Tak		(substituted off) 12'
CM	23	Chu Siu Kei
RM	7	Chan Siu Ki		(substituted off) 74'
LM	8	Lee Hong Lim		(substituted off) 79'
ST	22	Jaimes McKee
Substitutions:
GK	18	Tse Tak Him
GK	19	Zhang Chunhui
ST	5	Cheng Lai Hin
MF	6	Huang Yang		(substituted on) 12'
FW	11	Lam Hok Hei		(substituted on) 74'
DF	17	Chiu Chun Kit		(substituted on) 79'
Manager:
(South Korea) Kim Pan-Gon

22 March 2013 Matchday 2	Hong Kong	1 – 0	Vietnam	Mong Kok, Hong Kong
20:00 (GMT+8)	Chan Wai Ho 87'	Report (AFC); Report (HKFA)		Stadium: Mong Kok Stadium (Capacity: 6,680); Attendance: 6,639; Referee: Abdulrahman Abdou (Qatar); Assistant referees: Taleb Salem Al-Marri (Qatar), Yaser Marad (Kuwait); Fourth official: Fahad Al-Marri (Qatar)

Match detail

Hong Kong	Vietnam

HONG KONG:
GK	1	Yapp Hung Fai
RB	21	Kwok Kin Pong
CB	15	Chan Wai Ho	(c)
CB	2	Lee Chi Ho	(yellow card) 84'
LB	13	Cheung Kin Fung
DM	6	Huang Yang
DM	4	Bai He	(yellow card) 78'
CM	23	Chu Siu Kei		(substituted off) 80'
RM	9	Lee Wai Lim		(substituted off) 57'
LM	22	Jaimes McKee
ST	20	Chan Man Fai		(substituted off) 57'
Substitutes:
GK	18	Tse Tak Him
GK	19	Leung Hing Kit
DF	5	Chak Ting Fung
MF	8	Lee Hong Lim		(substituted on) 57'
MF	10	Lam Ka Wai		(substituted on) 80'
FW	11	Lam Hok Hei
MF	14	Xu Deshuai		(substituted on) 57'
MF	16	Au Yeung Yiu Chung
DF	17	Chiu Chun Kit
Coach:
Kim Pan-Gon (South Korea)

VIETNAM:
GK	22	Tran Buu Ngọc
RB	2	Âu Văn Hoàn
CB	21	Michal Nguyễn	(yellow card) 49'
CB	3	Nguyễn Gia Từ
LB	15	Đào Văn Phong
DM	13	Phạm Nguyên Sa
CM	10	Nguyễn Văn Quyết
CM	14	Lê Tấn Tài	(c)	(yellow card) 34'
RM	19	Phạm Thành Lương
LM	16	Huỳnh Quốc Anh		(substituted off) 88'
ST	9	Mạc Hồng Quân		(substituted off) 81'
Substitutions:
GK	1	Nguyễn Thanh Bình
GK	23	Huỳnh Tuấn Linh
DF	4	Dương Thanh Hào
MF	5	Ngô Hoang Thinh
DF	6	Nguyễn Xuân Hùng
MF	7	Nguyễn Huy Hùng
MF	8	Hoàng Danh Ngọc
FW	11	Nguyen Hai Anh
MF	12	Trần Mạnh Dũng		(substituted on) 88'
MF	17	Lê Văn Thắng		(substituted on) 81'
FW	18	Hà Minh Tuấn
DF	20	Le Quang Hung
Manager:
(Vietnam) Hoàng Văn Phúc

==== 2013 Guangdong–Hong Kong Cup ====
This is a tournament between two teams representing Hong Kong and Guangdong Province of China respectively. The first leg will take place in Huizhou, Guangdong, being held in Huizhou Olympic Stadium, and the second leg took place in Hong Kong, being held in Mong Kok Stadium.

Guangdong took the 1–0 lead in the first leg, thanks to Yin Hongbo's goalscoring penalty before the end of match. However, Hong Kong levelled the game in the second leg, with Bai He's and Lee Wai Lim's header, while Guangdong's Shi Liang scored once. After 120 minutes of play, the scoreline levels in 2–2, thus the game proceeded to penalty shoot-out stage. Both team scored 8 out of 8 penalties perfectly, and Wisdom Fofo Agbo scored the ninth penalty for Hong Kong. However, Guangdong's Shi Liang, who scored once in the tournament, missed the kick as Yapp Hung Fai saved. Hong Kong won the champions of the 2013 edition.

29 December 2012 1st leg	Guangdong (China)	1 – 0	Hong Kong	Huizhou, Guangdong
15:00(GMT+8)	Yin Hongbo 88' (pen.)	Report		Stadium: Huizhou Olympic Stadium; Referee: Chen Honghui (China PR)

Match detail

Guangdong	Hong Kong

GUANGDONG:
GK	22	Hou Yu
RB	20	Zhu Cong
CB	5	Yuan Lin
CB	8	Chen Jianlong
LB	28	Rao Weihui
RM	16	Li Jian		(substituted off) 60'
CM	6	Li Yan
CM	25	Pan Jia		(substituted off) 85'
LM	23	Lu Lin	(yellow card) 45'	(substituted off) 75'
ST	10	Huang Fengtao
ST	18	Yin Hongbo	(c)
Substitutes:
GK	1	Li Weijun
DF	4	Guo Zichao
MF	7	Huang Long		(substituted on) 85'
FW	9	Huang Haoxuan
FW	11	Chang Feiya		(substituted on) 75'
FW	13	Shi Liang		(substituted on) 60'
MF	14	Tan Binliang
MF	17	Yu Jianfeng
MF	35	Liao Junjian
Coach:
Cao Yang (China)

HONG KONG:
GK	1	Yapp Hung Fai
RB	3	Man Pei Tak		(substituted off) 90'
CB	5	Sean Tse
CB	2	Wisdom Fofo Agbo	(yellow card) 16'
LB	21	Kwok Kin Pong
DM	16	Leung Chun Pong
DF	4	Bai He
DF	22	Michael Campion		(substituted off) 45'
AM	11	Lam Hok Hei		(substituted off) 71'
AM	23	Chu Siu Kei		(substituted off) 70'
ST	7	Chan Siu Ki	(c)
Substitutions:
GK	19	Leung Hing Kit
ST	6	Cheng Siu Wai		(substituted on) 90'
ST	9	Leung Wai Lim		(substituted on) 71'
DF	13	Cheung Kin Fung
FW	14	Sham Kwok Keung		(substituted on) 85'
DF	15	Chan Wai Ho
DF	24	Jack Sealy		(substituted on) 70'
FW	29	James Ha		(substituted on) 45' (substituted off) 85'
Manager:
(South Korea) Kim Pan-Gon

1 January 2013 2nd leg	Hong Kong	2 – 1 (a.e.t.) (9 – 8 p)	(China) Guangdong	Mong Kok, Hong Kong
15:00(GMT+8)		Report	66' Shi Liang	Stadium: Mong Kok Stadium; Attendance: 4,587; Referee: Liu Kwok Man (Hong Kong)
	Penalties
	Yin Hongbo (penalty scored); Huang Fengtao (penalty scored); Rao Weihui (penalty scored); Liao Junjian (penalty scored); Pan Jia (penalty scored); Chang Feiya (penalty scored); Huang Haoxuan (penalty scored); Guo Zichao (penalty scored); Shi Liang (penalty missed)		(penalty scored) Chan Siu Ki; (penalty scored) Cheung Kin Fung; (penalty scored) Lam Hok Hei; (penalty scored) Lee Wai Lim; (penalty scored) Bai He; (penalty scored) Kwok Kin Pong; (penalty scored) McKee; (penalty scored) Man Pei Tak; (penalty scored) Fofo

Match detail

Hong Kong	Guangdong

HONG KONG:
GK	1	Yapp Hung Fai
RB	24	Jack Sealy		(substituted off) 71'
CB	5	Chan Wai Ho	(c)	(substituted off) 79'
CB	2	Wisdom Fofo Agbo
LB	13	Cheung Kin Fung
DM	16	Leung Chun Pong		(substituted off) 90'
DF	4	Bai He
AM	23	Chu Siu Kei		(substituted off) 67'
RM	9	Lee Wai Lim
LM	25	Jaimes McKee
ST	7	Chan Siu Ki
Substitutions:
GK	19	Leung Hing Kit
MF	3	Man Pei Tak		(substituted on) 90'
DF	5	Sean Tse		(substituted on) 79'
ST	6	Cheng Siu Wai
ST	11	Lam Hok Hei		(substituted on) 100'
FW	14	Sham Kwok Keung
DF	21	Kwok Kin Pong		(substituted on) 71'
DF	22	Michael Campion	(yellow card) 82'	(substituted on) 67' (substituted off) 100'
FW	29	James Ha
Manager:
(South Korea) Kim Pan-Gon

GUANGDONG:
GK	22	Hou Yu
RB	20	Zhu Cong		(substituted off) 77'
CB	5	Yuan Lin
CB	8	Chen Jianlong		(substituted off) 83'
LB	28	Rao Weihui	(yellow card) 57'
RM	16	Li Jian		(substituted off) 75'
CM	6	Li Yan		(substituted off) 103'
CM	25	Pan Jia	(yellow card) 95'
LM	18	Yin Hongbo	(c)
ST	10	Huang Fengtao	(yellow card) 37'
ST	13	Shi Liang
Substitutes:
GK	1	Li Weijun
DF	4	Guo Zichao		(substituted on) 77'
MF	7	Huang Long		(substituted on) 83'
FW	9	Huang Haoxuan		(substituted on) 103'
FW	11	Chang Feiya		(substituted on) 75'
MF	14	Tan Binliang
MF	17	Yu Jianfeng
MF	24	Yang Bin
MF	35	Liao Junjian
Coach:
Cao Yang (China)

==== Friendly matches in first half season ====
An away friendly match for Hong Kong is proposed. Hong Kong will play against Singapore in August. The match was originally proposed to play at Bishan Stadium in Bishan, but then changed to Jurong West Stadium in Jurong West.

15 August 2012	Singapore	2 – 0	Hong Kong	Jurong West, Singapore
20:30(SST)	7', 21' Đurić	Report		Stadium: Jurong West Stadium (Capacity:3,200); Attendance: 837

Match detail

Singapore	Hong Kong

SINGAPORE:
GK	1	Izwan Mahbud
DF	5	Baihakki Khaizan
DF	16	Daniel Bennett
DF	21	Jufri Taha		(substituted off) 46'
MF	7	Shi Jiayi
MF	8	Shahdan Sulaiman		(substituted off) 77'
MF	14	Hariss Harun	(c)
MF	15	Fahrudin Mustafić		(substituted off) 72'
ST	20	Khairul Nizam		(substituted off) 46'
ST	11	Qiu Li		(substituted off) 60'
ST	9	Aleksandar Đurić		(substituted off) 81'
Substitutes:
GK		Hyrulnizam Juma'at
GK		Joey Sim
DF		Juma'at Jantan		(substituted on) 46'
DF		Irwan Shah		(substituted on) 77'
DF		Delwinder Singh
MF		Nazrul Nazari		(substituted on) 60'
MF		Isa Halim		(substituted on) 72'
MF		Yasir Hanapi
MF		Safirul Sulaiman
ST		Khairul Amri		(substituted on) 46'
ST		Shahfiq Ghani		(substituted on) 81'
Coach:
Radojko Avramović (Serbia)

HONG KONG:
GK	1	Yapp Hung Fai
RB	12	Lo Kwan Yee	(c)
CB	5	Bai He	(substituted off) 90'
CB	2	Lee Chi Ho
LB	13	Cheung Kin Fung	(substituted off) 61'
DM	6	Huang Yang
CM	10	Lam Ka Wai	(substituted off) 86'
RM	16	Leung Chun Pong	(substituted off) 44'
LM	9	Lee Hong Lim	(substituted off) 64'
ST	21	Lam Hok Hei
ST	7	Chan Siu Ki	(substituted off) 79'
Substitutions:
GK	19	Leung Hing Kit
MF	3	Liu Songwei
ST	9	Leung Tsz Chun	(substituted on) 90'
ST	11	Au Yeung Yiu Chung	(substituted on) 64'
MF	14	Tam Lok Hin
DF	17	Tsang Chi Hau	(substituted on) 44'
DF	20	Chak Ting Fung	(substituted on) 64'
FW	24	Yip Chi Chun	(substituted on) 86'
MF	25	Lee Ka Yiu	(substituted on) 79'
Manager:
(Scotland) Ernie Merrick

According to the official website of the FIFA, Hong Kong will play a home match against Malaysia on 16 October 2012.

16 October 2012	Hong Kong	0 – 3	Malaysia	Mong Kok, Kowloon, Hong Kong
20:00 (GMT+8)	Yapp Hung Fai (yellow card) 51'	Report	(yellow card) 20' Kunanlan; (yellow card) 51' (goal) 60' Sali; (yellow card) 61' Faizal; 82' (yellow card) 90' Rahim; 90+2' Saarani	Stadium: Mong Kok Stadium (Capacity:6,680); Attendance: 3,267; Referee: Liu Kwok Man (Hong Kong)

Match detail

Hong Kong	Malaysia

HONG KONG:
GK	1	Yapp Hung Fai	(yellow card) 51'
RB	12	Lo Kwan Yee (c)
CB	3	Liu Songwei
CB	4	Bai He
LB	13	Cheung Kin Fung
DM	6	Huang Yang
DM	23	Chu Siu Kei		(substituted off) 81'
RM	22	Ju Yingzhi		(substituted off) 54'
AM	10	Lam Ka Wai		(substituted off) 75'
LM	8	Lee Hong Lim		(substituted off) 72'
CF	9	Lam Hok Hei		(substituted off) 57'
Substitutions:
GK	18	Tse Tak Him
MF	5	Che Runqiu
MF	11	Au Yeung Yiu Chung		(substituted on) 72'
FW	14	Sham Kwok Keung		(substituted on) 57'
DF	17	Tsang Chi Hau
DF	20	Chak Ting Fung
MF	21	Lau Nim Yat		(substituted on) 81'
FW	24	Yip Chi Chun		(substituted on) 75'
MF	25	Lee La Yiu		(substituted on) 54'
Manager:
(Scotland) Ernie Merrick

MALAYSIA:
GK	22	Mohd Farizal Marlias
RB	2	Mahali Jasuli		(substituted off) 78'
CB	6	Mohd Faizal Muhammad	(yellow card) 61'	(substituted off) 78'
CB	27	Mohd Fadhli Mohd Shas
LB	25	Mohd Zubir Azmi
DM	12	Mohd Amar Rohidan
DM	16	S. Kunanlan	(yellow card) 20'	(substituted off) 60'
AM	15	Gary Steven Robbat		(substituted off) 74'
SS	23	Baddrol Bakhtiar		(substituted off) 83'
SS	9	Mohd Azamuddin Md Akil		(substituted off) 74'
CF	10	Mohd Safee Mohd Sali (c)	(yellow card) 51'
Substitutes:
GK	1	Norazlan Razali
DF	5	Mohd Bunyamin Umar		(substituted on) 78'
MF	8	Mohd Safiq Rahim	(yellow card) 90'	(substituted on) 74'
FW	13	Ahmad Fakri Saarani		(substituted on) 83'
MF	14	Wan Zack Haikal Wan Noor		(substituted on) 60'
MF	18	Yong Kuong Yong
FW	19	Gopinathan Ramachandra		(substituted on) 74'
DF	21	Irwan Fadzli Idrus		(substituted on) 78'
Coach:
(Malaysia) Datuk K. Rajagopal

According to the official website of the FIFA, Hong Kong will play an away match against Malaysia on 14 November 2012.

14 November 2012	Malaysia	1 – 1	Hong Kong	Shah Alam, Malaysia
20:45 (GMT+8)	Sali 58'	Report	88' Lam Hok Hei	Stadium: Shah Alam Stadium (Capacity: 80,000)

Match detail

Malaysia	Hong Kong

MALAYSIA:
GK	22	Khairul Fahmi Che Mat
RB	5	Mohd Bunyamin Umar		(substituted off) 74'
CB	7	Mohd Aidil Zafuan Abdul Radzak
CB	27	Mohd Fadhli Mohd Shas
LB	26	Mohd Zubir Azmi		(substituted off) 86'
DM	12	Mohd Amar Rohidan	(yellow card) 37'	(substituted off) 61'
DM	16	S. Kunanlan		(substituted off) 46'
MF	8	Mohd Safiq Rahim
SS	19	Mohd Azamuddin Md Akil		(substituted off) 41'
SS	9	Norshahrul Idlan Talaha
CF	10	Mohd Safee Mohd Sali (c)	(yellow card) 78'	(substituted off) 83'
Substitutes:
GK	1	Mohd Farizal Marlias
GK	28	Mohd Izham Tarmizi
DF	2	Mahali Jasuli		(substituted on) 74'
DF	3	Mohd Faizal Muhammad
DF	11	Mohd Azmi Muslim		(substituted on) 86'
MF	13	Ahmad Fakri Saarani
FW	14	Mohd Khyril Muhymeen Zambri		(substituted on) 83'
MF	15	Gary Steven Robbat
FW	17	Mohd Zaquan Adha Abdul Radzak
MF	18	Mohd Shakir Shaari		(substituted on) 61'
MF	20	Gopinathan Ramachandra		(substituted on) 46'
DF	21	Irwan Fadzli Idrus
MF	23	Baddrol Bakhtiar
FW	24	Ahmad Hazwan Bakri
MF	25	Wan Zack Haikal Wan Noor	(yellow card) 87'	(substituted on) 41'
Coach:
(Malaysia) Datuk K. Rajagopal

HONG KONG:
GK	1	Yapp Hung Fai
RB	12	Lo Kwan Yee
CB	2	Lee Chi Ho	(yellow card) 34' (yellow-red card) 79'
CB	15	Chan Wai Ho (c)
LB	21	Kwok Kin Pong
DM	6	Huang Yang		(substituted off) 90'
DM	3	Liu Songwei		(substituted off) 69'
RM	9	Lee Wai Lim		(substituted off) 66'
AM	10	Lam Ka Wai		(substituted off) 35'
LM	8	Lee Hong Lim		(substituted off) 76'
CF	25	Jaimes McKee
Substitutions:
GK	18	Tse Tak Him
MF	4	Bai He		(substituted on) 69'
MF	11	Lam Hok Hei		(substituted on) 76'
DF	13	Cheung Kin Fung
FW	14	Cheng Siu Wai		(substituted on) 35' (substituted off) 84'
DF	17	Chiu Chun Kit		(substituted on) 84'
DF	20	Chak Ting Fung
FW	22	Chan Man Fai		(substituted on) 66'
MF	23	Michael Luk		(substituted on) 90'
Manager:
(South Korea) Kim Pan-Gon

==== Friendly matches in second half season ====
According to the official website of the FIFA, Hong Kong will play a home match against the Philippines on 4 June 2013.

4 June 2013	Hong Kong	0 – 1	Philippines	Mong Kok, Hong Kong
20:00 (GMT+8)	Chan Siu Ki (penalty missed) 68'	Report	33' J Younghusband	Stadium: Mong Kok Stadium (Capacity: 6,680); Attendance: 4,578; Referee: Pratan Nasa Wang (Thailand); Assistant referees: Chan Shui Hung (Hong Kong); Fourth official: Liu Kwok Man (Hong Kong)

Match detail

Hong Kong	Philippines

HONG KONG:
GK	1	Yapp Hung Fai
RB	12	Lo Kwan Yee		(substituted off) 65'
CB	2	Lee Chi Ho
CB	15	Chan Wai Ho
LB	13	Cheung Kin Fung
DM	6	Huang Yang
DM	16	Leung Chun Pong		(substituted off) 77'
CM	23	Chu Siu Kei		(substituted off) 36'
RM	9	Lee Wai Lim		(substituted off) 61'
LM	22	Jaimes McKee		(substituted off) 61'
ST	7	Chan Siu Ki	(yellow card) 83'
Substitutions:
GK	19	Wang Zhenpeng
DF	3	Wisdom Fofo Agbo
FW	8	Lee Hong Lim		(substituted on) 61'
MF	10	Lam Ka Wai		(substituted on) 36'
MF	14	To Hon To
MF	20	Chan Man Fai	(yellow card) 80'	(substituted on) 61'
DF	21	Kwok Kin Pong		(substituted on) 65'
DF	24	Chak Ting Fung
MF	25	Wong Wai		(substituted on) 77'
Manager:
(South Korea) Kim Pan-Gon

PHILIPPINES:
GK	1	Neil Etheridge
RB	14	Carli de Murga
CB	2	Rob Gier		(substituted off) 68'
CB	5	Juan Luis Guirado	(yellow card) 67'
LB	28	Jeffrey Christiaens
CM	18	Chris Greatwich
CM	17	Stephan Schröck	(yellow card) 64'
LM	13	Emelio Caligdong		(substituted off) 46'
RM	7	James Younghusband		(substituted off) 90+4'
AM	22	Paul Mulders		(substituted off) 70'
ST	10	Phil Younghusband
Substitutes:
GK	11	Eduard Sacapaño
MF	4	OJ Porteria		(substituted on) 68'
MF	6	Manuel Ott
FW	9	Misagh Bahadoran	(yellow card) 47'	(substituted on) 46'
MF	15	Mike Ott
MF	24	Marwin Angeles		(substituted on) 70'
MF	33	Lexton Moy
Coach:
(Germany) Michael Weiß

=== Hong Kong Under-21 ===
==== Friendly matches in first half season ====
The Hong Kong Football Association has organised a friendly match between the Hong Kong U-21 and Australia U-19 on 29 August 2012 at Mong Kok Stadium, Hong Kong.

29 August 2012	Hong Kong U-21	0 – 3	Australia U-19	Mong Kok, Kowloon, Hong Kong
19:30 (GMT+8)		Report	Goal	Stadium: Mong Kok Stadium (Capacity:6,680)

== First Division League ==
Pos	Team	Pld	W	D	L	GF	GA	GD	Pts	Qualification or relegation
1	South China (C)	18	11	3	4	46	21	+25	36	2014 AFC Champions League play-off stage
2	Kitchee	18	9	5	4	39	23	+16	32	2014 AFC Cup (Note: Kitchee won the 2012–13 Hong Kong Season play-off and thus qualified for the 2014 AFC Cup Group stage.)
3	Tuen Mun	18	8	4	6	29	31	−2	28	2012–13 Hong Kong Season play-off (Note: Southern qualified for the play-offs as Kitchee defeated Sun Pegasus in the FA Cup while they have guaranteed a place for the play-offs, meaning the league 4th place qualifies.)
4	Southern	18	6	6	6	24	27	−3	24	2012–13 Hong Kong Season play-off
5	Sun Pegasus	18	4	9	5	35	29	+6	21	
6	Hong Kong Rangers	18	5	5	8	32	52	−20	20 (Note: HKR 3–3 CIT, HKR 2–2 SUN, HKR 1–1 YHK; CIT 2–3 HKR, CIT 1–2 SUN, CIT 3–0 YHK; SUN 2–2 HKR, SUN 1–1 CIT, SUN 1–1 YHK; YHK 2–4 HKR, YHK 1–1 CIT, YHK 2–0 SUN)	
7	Sunray Cave JC Sun Hei	18	4	8	6	26	33	−7	20	
8	Citizen	18	5	5	8	31	27	+4	20	
9	Yokohama FC Hong Kong	18	4	8	6	25	34	−9	20	
10	Wofoo Tai Po (Note: Wofoo Tai Po won the 2012–13 Hong Kong Senior Challenge Shield and thus qualified for the 2012–13 Hong Kong Season play-off along with Southern District whom qualified due to Kitchee winning the FA Cup along with coming runners up in the league.) (R)	18	4	7	7	34	44	−10	19	2012–13 Hong Kong Season play-off and relegation to the 2013–14 Hong Kong Second Division League

Updated to match(es) played on 26 May 2013. Source:
Rules for classification: 1) points; 2) head-to-head points; 3) head-to-head goal difference; 4) head-to-head goals scored; 5) goal difference; 6) number of goals scored.
(C) Champions; (R) Relegated

=== Monthly awards ===
The monthly awards are organised by the Hong Kong Sports Press Association. 20 journalists who specialise in football in Hong Kong will vote their best player of the month. Player with the highest number of votes wins the award.

Year	Month	Winner	Club	Source
2012	September	(Hong Kong) Lee Chi Ho	South China	
2012	October	(Brazil) Detinho	Citizen	
2012	November	(Brazil) Detinho	Citizen	
2012	December	(Hong Kong) Lee Wai Lim	South China	
2013	January	(Hong Kong) Au Yeung Yiu Chung	South China	
2013	February	(Ghana) Christian Annan	Wofoo Tai Po	
2013	March	(Hong Kong) Zhang Chunhui	Sunray Cave JC Sun Hei	
2013	April	(Hong Kong) Li Haiqiang	Tuen Mun	
2013	May	(Spain) Jordi Tarrés	Kitchee	

== Second Division League ==
Pos	Team	Pld	W	D	L	GF	GA	GD	Pts	Promotion or relegation
1	Yuen Long (C, P)	20	16	3	1	70	15	+55	51	Promotion to First Division
2	Happy Valley (P)	20	13	5	2	54	20	+34	44	Promotion to First Division
3	Eastern Salon (P)	20	12	6	2	41	21	+20	42	Promotion to First Division
4	Tai Chung	20	12	4	4	53	25	+28	40	
5	Hong Kong FC	20	12	1	7	49	33	+16	37	
6	Wing Yee	20	7	6	7	31	39	−8	27	
7	Shatin	20	7	4	9	28	29	−1	25	
8	Wanchai	20	4	3	13	28	44	−16	15	
9	Double Flower	20	3	2	15	19	64	−45	11	
10	Tuen Mun FC	20	3	1	16	32	73	−41	10	
11	Sham Shui Po (R)	20	2	3	15	16	58	−42	9	Relegation to Third Division

Updated to match(es) played on 5 May 2013. Source: Second Division Score Table
Rules for classification: 1) points; 2) head-to-head points; 3) head-to-head goal difference; 4) head-to-head goals scored; 5) goal difference; 6) number of goals scored.
(C) Champions; (P) Promoted; (R) Relegated

== Third Division League ==
Pos	Team	Pld	W	D	L	GF	GA	GD	Pts	Promotion or relegation
1	Wong Tai Sin (C, P)	26	18	5	3	59	25	+34	59	Promotion to Second Division
2	Lucky Mile (P)	26	18	3	5	66	29	+37	57	Promotion to Second Division
3	Kwun Tong (P)	26	16	6	4	48	25	+23	54	Promotion to Second Division
4	Kwai Tsing (P)	26	13	6	7	53	34	+19	45	Promotion to Second Division
5	New Fair Kui Tan	26	12	6	8	40	25	+15	42	
6	Fire Services	26	9	9	8	38	33	+5	36	
7	Tsuen Wan	26	9	8	9	21	23	−2	35	
8	Fu Moon	26	8	8	10	29	37	−8	32	
9	Eastern District	26	8	7	11	38	36	+2	31	
10	KCDRSC	26	8	3	15	24	47	−23	27	
11	Kowloon City	26	5	7	14	28	50	−22	22	
12	Kwok Keung	26	5	6	15	25	58	−33	21 (Note: KKA 1–0 TEL; TEL 0–3 KKA)	
13	Telecom	26	5	6	15	20	50	−30	21	
14	Fukien (R)	26	4	8	14	28	45	−17	20	Relegation to Fourth Division

Updated to match(es) played on 5 May 2013. Source: hkfa.com
Rules for classification: 1) points; 2) head-to-head points; 3) head-to-head goal difference; 4) head-to-head goals scored; 5) goal difference; 6) number of goals scored.
(C) Champions; (P) Promoted; (R) Relegated

== Fourth Division League ==
Pos	Team	Pld	W	D	L	GF	GA	GD	Pts	Promotion or relegation
1	Yau Tsim Mong (C, P)	28	26	0	2	148	20	+128	78	Promotion to Third Division
2	Mutual (P)	28	23	2	3	132	38	+94	71	Promotion to Third Division
3	Kwong Wah (P)	28	18	4	6	72	36	+36	58	Promotion to Third Division
4	Sun Source (P)	28	17	4	7	98	38	+60	55	Promotion to Third Division
5	Sai Kung Friends	28	15	5	8	62	41	+21	50	
6	St. Joseph's	28	13	6	9	43	39	+4	45	
7	Sai Kung	28	12	3	13	58	46	+12	39	
8	Central & Western	28	10	2	16	49	74	−25	32	
9	Solon	28	9	5	14	44	76	−32	32	
10	Lung Moon	28	10	1	17	28	66	−38	31	
11	North District	28	8	4	16	47	101	−54	28	
12	Ornament	28	8	4	16	46	74	−28	28	
13	Islands	28	8	3	17	49	70	−21	27	
14	Tung Sing	28	5	7	16	33	77	−44	22	
15	Blake Garden (E)	28	2	2	24	18	131	−113	8	Elimination from Hong Kong league

Updated to match(es) played on 19 May 2013. Source: Fourth Division Score Table
Rules for classification: 1) points; 2) head-to-head points; 3) head-to-head goal difference; 4) head-to-head goals scored; 5) goal difference; 6) number of goals scored.
(C) Champions; (E) Eliminated; (P) Promoted

== Exhibition matches ==
=== Arsenal's Asia Tour 2012 against Kitchee ===
English Premier League side Arsenal played against Hong Kong First Division League champions Kitchee on Sunday, 29 July 2012 at the Hong Kong Stadium as part of Arsenal's Asia Tour 2012.

29 July 2012	Kitchee (Hong Kong)	2 – 2	(England) Arsenal	So Kon Po, Hong Kong
17:00 (GMT+8)	Yago 8'; Dani 28'	Report(HKFA); Report(Arsenal.com)	24' Walcott; 77' Eisfeld; (yellow card) 80' Santos	Stadium: Hong Kong Stadium (Capacity: 40,000); Attendance: 39,209; Referee: Liu Kwok Man; Assistant referees: Cheng Oi Cho, Chan Shui Hung; Fourth official: Ng Chiu Kok
