= 2012 Philippine Peace Cup =

Tournament details
- Host country: Philippines
- Dates: September 25–29
- Teams: 4 (from 1 confederation)
- Venue(s): 1 (in 1 host city)

Final positions
- Champions: Philippines (1st title)
- Runners-up: Chinese Taipei
- Third place: Guam
- Fourth place: Macau

Tournament statistics
- Matches played: 6
- Goals scored: 19 (3.17 per match)
- Top scorer(s): (Philippines) Denis Wolf (4 goals)
- Best player(s): (Philippines) Denis Wolf
- Best goalkeeper: (Philippines) Eduard Sacapaño

The 2012 Philippine Peace Cup was the inaugural edition of the tournament, four-nation international football competition organized by the Philippine Football Federation (PFF). It was originally slated for October 12–16 but the PFF moved it to September 25–29 to give way to the participation of local side Loyola Meralco Sparks in the 2012 Singapore Cup. ABS-CBN covered the games on Studio 23.

The tournament was due to be the third annual Long Teng Cup, however, the organizers, the Chinese Taipei Football Association (CTFA), withdrew from staging the 2012 edition and requested the PFF to host it. The PFF then renamed it as the Paulino Alcántara Cup, after Filipino–Spanish football legend who played for FC Barcelona. It was again renamed to the Paulino Alcántara Peace Cup and eventually to the Philippine Peace Cup as the Philippine Sports Commission, which operates the Rizal Memorial Stadium where the tournament will be held, has a rule against events named after an individual. The month of September is also peace month in the Philippines and the tournament saw involvement of the office of the presidential adviser on the country's peace process.

After 99 years, the Philippines won their first international title since the 1913 Far Eastern Games.

== Competing teams ==
This tournament was due to be the third staging of the Long Teng Cup, all four participants of the tournament were to take part. However, Hong Kong withdrew from participating with Pakistan initially being mooted as their replacement. The PFF then invited Guam which they eventually accepted, thus replacing Hong Kong as the fourth team.

The four national teams that will take part are:

- Chinese Taipei
- Guam
- Macau
- Philippines

== Venue ==
The tournament was supposed to be held at Panaad Stadium in Bacolod, Negros Occidental. This was due to it supposedly being more financially feasible and that renovations were going to take place from August to September at Rizal Memorial Stadium. However, at the end of August 2012, PFF president Mariano Araneta announced that it will be moved back to the Rizal Memorial Stadium because the project, funded by FIFA which will turn the football field into an artificial turf, didn’t push through. Araneta added that conducting the tournament in Manila will lessen the expenses of the PFF in the event, which is estimated at ₱6 million.

Manila	Metro Manila
Rizal Memorial Stadium	2012 Philippine Peace Cup (Metro Manila)
Capacity: 30,000	2012 Philippine Peace Cup (Metro Manila)

== Matches ==
All times listed are UTC+8.

Group A

Pos	Team	Pld	W	D	L	GF	GA	GD	Pts
1	Philippines (H)	3	3	0	0	9	1	+8	9
2	Chinese Taipei	3	1	1	1	5	5	0	4
3	Guam	3	1	0	2	3	3	0	3
4	Macau	3	0	1	2	2	10	−8	1

(H) Hosts
September 25, 2012
16:00

Chinese Taipei	2–2	Macau
Lo Chih-en 48'; Yang Chao-hsun 89' (pen.)	Report	R. Torrão 45'; Chan Kin Seng 57'

Rizal Memorial Stadium, Manila
Referee: Jovanie Villagracia (Philippines)
September 25, 2012
19:30

Philippines	1–0	Guam
Reichelt 81'	Report

Rizal Memorial Stadium, Manila
Referee: Phung Dinh Dung (Vietnam)

September 27, 2012
16:00

Chinese Taipei	2–0	Guam
Lo Chih-an 11'; S. Guerrero 45' (o.g.)	Report

Rizal Memorial Stadium, Manila
Referee: Steve Supresencia (Philippines)
September 27, 2012
19:30

Philippines	5–0	Macau
Wolf 22', 45', 64'; De Murga 49'; Reichelt 69'	Report

Rizal Memorial Stadium, Manila
Referee: Vo Quang Vinh (Vietnam)

September 29, 2012
16:00

Macau	0–3	Guam
	Report	Lopez 45', 55'; Naputi 90'

Rizal Memorial Stadium, Manila
Referee: Jovanie Villagracia (Philippines)
September 29, 2012
19:30

Philippines	3–1	Chinese Taipei
Wolf 10'; Caligdong 34'; Porteria 43'	Report	Chang Han 51'

Rizal Memorial Stadium, Manila
Referee: Phung Dinh Dung (Vietnam)

== Awards ==
The following were awarded by the PFF after the tournament:

2012 Philippine Peace Cup champions

Philippines
First title

Best Goalkeeper Award	Best Defender Award	Best Midfielder Award
(Philippines) Eduard Sacapaño	(Philippines) Jeffrey Christiaens	(Philippines) Matthew Uy
Most Valuable Player	Golden Boot	Fair Play Award
(Philippines) Denis Wolf	(Philippines) Denis Wolf	Philippines

== Top goalscorers ==
4 goals
- (Philippines) Denis Wolf

2 goals
- (Guam) Marcus Lopez
- (Philippines) Patrick Reichelt

1 goal

- (Chinese Taipei) Chang Han
- (Chinese Taipei) Lo Chih-an
- (Chinese Taipei) Lo Chih-en
- (Chinese Taipei) Yang Chao-hsun
- (Guam) Dylan Naputi
- (Macau) Chan Kin Seng
- (Macau) Ricardo Torrão
- (Philippines) Emelio Caligdong
- (Philippines) Carli de Murga
- (Philippines) OJ Porteria

1 own goal
- (Guam) Scott Guerrero (against Chinese Taipei)
