= Bai He =

Hong Kong footballer

Bai He 白鶴
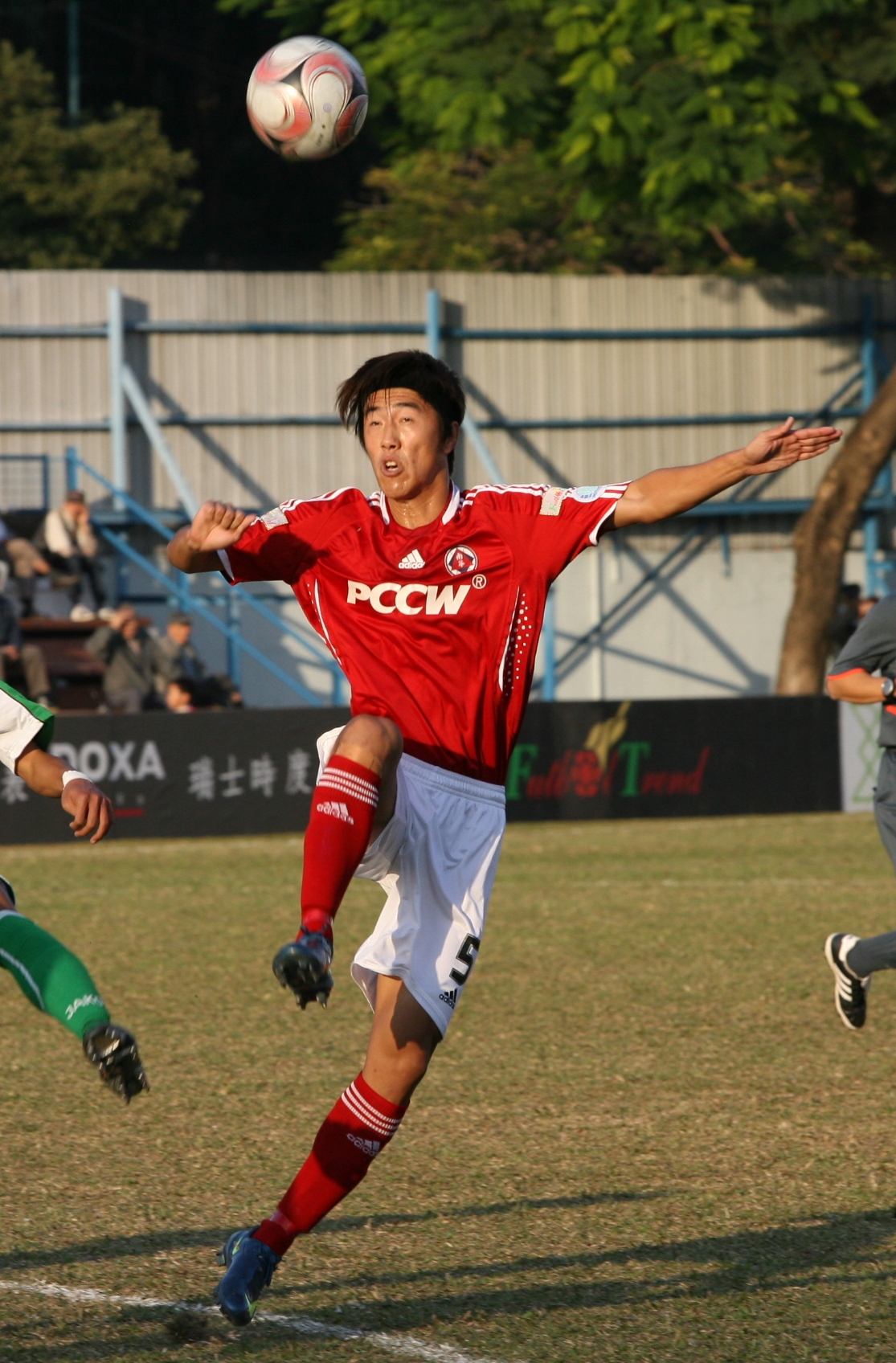

Personal information
- Full name: Bai He
- Date of birth: 19 November 1983 (age 42)
- Place of birth: Baoding, Hebei, China
- Height: 1.87 m (6 ft 2 in)
- Position: Defensive midfielder

Senior career*
Years	Team	Apps	(Gls)
2004–2006	Chengdu Wuniu	35	(0)
2006–2013	South China	79	(4)
2013	→ Pegasus (loan)	8	(0)
2013–2014	Pegasus	10	(0)
2014–2015	Shijiazhuang Ever Bright	30	(1)
2016–2018	Eastern	35	(4)
2018–2020	R&F	19	(2)

International career^{‡}
2009–2015	Hong Kong	34	(3)

Managerial career
- 2020–2024: Cangzhou Mighty Lions (assistant)
- * Club domestic league appearances and goals as of 25 June 2020 ‡ National team caps and goals as of 17 November 2015

Bai He
- Traditional Chinese: 白鶴
- Simplified Chinese: 白鹤
Transcriptions
Standard Mandarin
- Hanyu Pinyin: Bái Hè
- IPA: [pǎɪ xɤ̂]
Yue: Cantonese
- Jyutping: Baak6 Hok6
- IPA: [pak̚˨ hɔk̚˨]

Bai He (traditional Chinese: 白鶴; simplified Chinese: 白鹤, born 19 November 1983) is a former professional footballer who played as a defensive midfielder. Born in China, he represented Hong Kong internationally.

== Career statistics in Hong Kong ==
As of 11 May 2013

Club	Season	League		Senior Shield		League Cup		FA Cup		AFC Cup		Total	
Club	Season	Apps	Goals	Apps	Goals	Apps	Goals	Apps	Goals	Apps	Goals	Apps	Goals
South China	2006–07	7	0	4	0	4	0	3	0	-	-	18	0
South China	2007–08	12	0	2	0	4	0	1	0	-	-	19	0
South China	2008–09	18	2	2	0	1	0	2	0	7	0	30	2
South China	2009–10	9	1	3	0	-	-	0	0	9	0	21	1
South China	2010–11	13	1	3	1	2	1	2	0	5	0	25	3
South China	2011–12	16	0	3	0	1	0	1	0	-	-	21	0
South China	2012–13	4	0	1	0	0	0	0	0	-	-	5	0
Pegasus (loan)	2012–13	8	0	0	0	0	0	5	0	-	-	13	0
Total		87	4	18	1	12	1	14	0	21	0	152	6

== International career ==
He is selected by Hong Kong national football team for 2010 East Asian Football Championship semi-final while South China represent Hong Kong in the competition.

As of 19 November 2013

#	Date	Venue	Opponent	Result	Scored	Competition
1	23 August 2009	World Games Stadium, Kaohsiung, Taiwan	Chinese Taipei	4–0	0	2010 East Asian Football Championship Semi-final
2	25 August 2009	World Games Stadium, Kaohsiung, Taiwan	North Korea	0–0	0	2010 East Asian Football Championship Semi-final
3	27 August 2009	World Games Stadium, Kaohsiung, Taiwan	Guam	12–0	0	2010 East Asian Football Championship Semi-final
4	9 October 2009	Outsourcing Stadium, Shizuoka, Japan	Japan	0–6	0	2011 AFC Asian Cup qualification
5	18 November 2009	Hong Kong Stadium, Hong Kong	Japan	0–4	0	2011 AFC Asian Cup qualification
6	7 February 2010	Olympic Stadium, Tokyo, Japan	South Korea	0–5	0	2010 East Asian Football Championship
7	11 February 2010	Olympic Stadium, Tokyo, Japan	Japan	0–3	0	2010 East Asian Football Championship
8	14 February 2010	Olympic Stadium, Tokyo, Japan	China	0–2	0	2010 East Asian Football Championship
9	17 November 2010	Hong Kong Stadium, Hong Kong	Paraguay	0–7	0	Friendly
10	29 February 2012	Mong Kok Stadium, Hong Kong	Chinese Taipei	5–1	0	Friendly
11	1 June 2012	Hong Kong Stadium, Hong Kong	Singapore	1–0	0	Friendly
12	10 June 2012	Mong Kok Stadium, Hong Kong	Vietnam	1–2	0	Friendly
13	15 August 2012	Jurong West Stadium, Singapore	Singapore	0–2	0	Friendly
14	16 October 2012	Mong Kok Stadium, Mong Kok, Kowloon	Malaysia	0–3	0	Friendly
15	14 November 2012	Shah Alam Stadium, Shah Alam, Malaysia	Malaysia	1–1	0	Friendly
16	3 December 2012	Mong Kok Stadium, Mong Kok, Hong Kong	Australia	0–1	0	2013 EAFF East Asian Cup Preliminary Competition Round 2
17	7 December 2012	Hong Kong Stadium, So Kon Po, Hong Kong	Chinese Taipei	2–0	0	2013 EAFF East Asian Cup Preliminary Competition Round 2
18	9 December 2012	Hong Kong Stadium, So Kon Po, Hong Kong	North Korea	0–4	0	2013 EAFF East Asian Cup Preliminary Competition Round 2
19	6 February 2013	Pakhtakor Stadium, Uzbekistan	Uzbekistan	0–0	0	2015 AFC Asian Cup qualification
20	22 March 2013	Mong Kok Stadium, Mong Kok, Hong Kong	Vietnam	1–0	0	2015 AFC Asian Cup qualification
	6 September 2013	Thuwunna Stadium, Yangon, Myanmar	Myanmar	0–0	0	Friendly
21	10 September 2013	Mong Kok Stadium, Mong Kok, Hong Kong	Singapore	1–0	1	Friendly
22	15 November 2013	Mohammed Bin Zayed Stadium, Abu Dhabi, United Arab Emirates	United Arab Emirates	0–4	0	2015 AFC Asian Cup qualification
23	19 November 2013	Hong Kong Stadium, So Kon Po, Hong Kong	Uzbekistan	0–2	0	2015 AFC Asian Cup qualification

== Honours ==
=== Club ===
South China

- Hong Kong First Division: 2006–07, 2007–08, 2008–09, 2009–10
- Hong Kong FA Cup: 2010–11
- Hong Kong League Cup: 2010–11

Eastern

- Hong Kong Premier League: 2015–16
- Hong Kong Senior Shield: 2015–16
