= Christian Schweizer =

Guamanian footballer

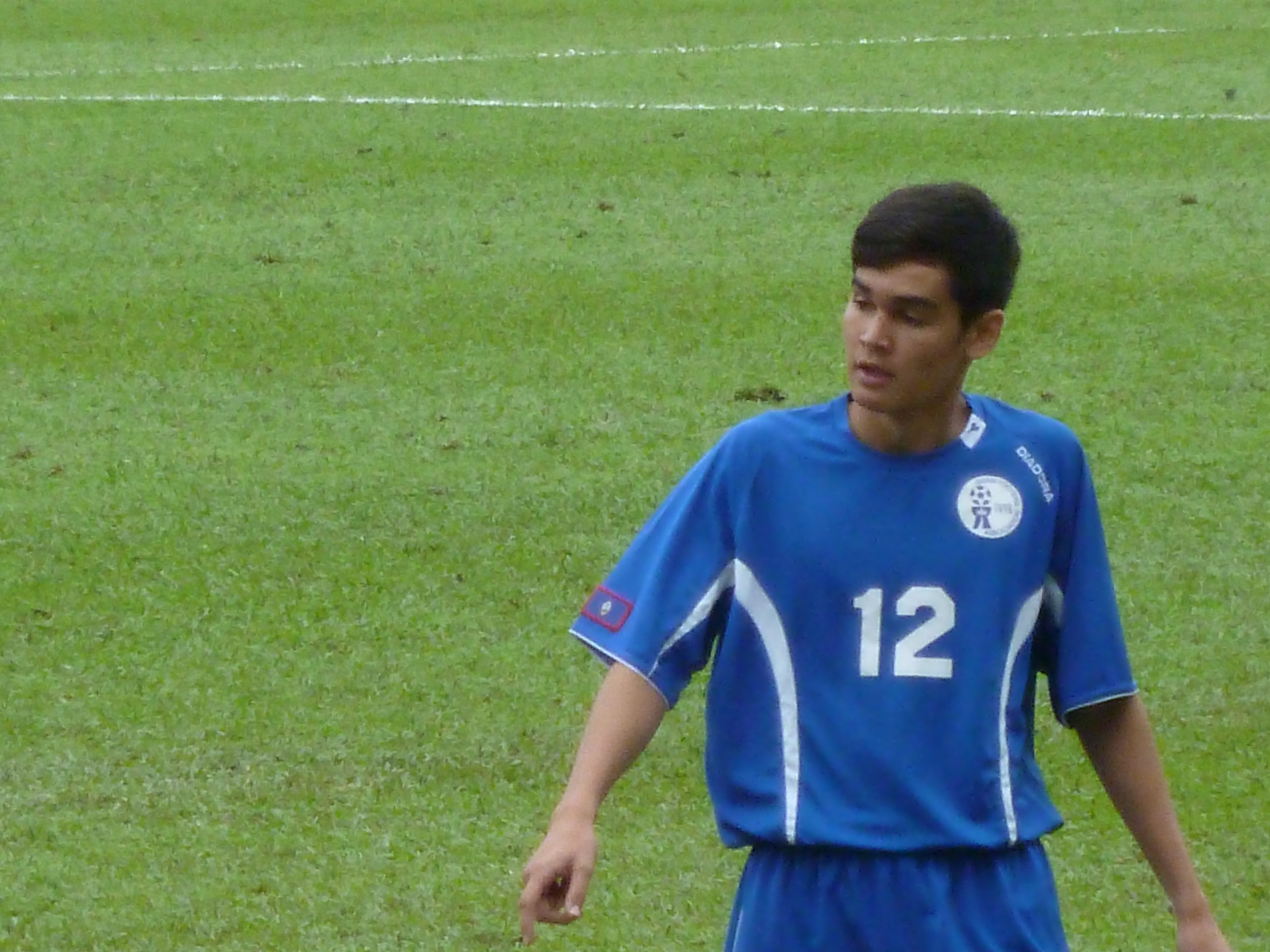

Personal information
- Full name: Christian Schweizer
- Date of birth: January 6, 1995 (age 31)
- Height: 1.75 m (5 ft 9 in)
- Position: Defender

Youth career
- 2002–2007: Crushers Football Club
- 2007–2008: Wings S.C.
- 2009–2011: St. John’s Knights

Senior career*
| Years | Team | Apps | (Gls) |
| 2011– | Fuji-Ichiban Espada FC | | |

International career^{‡}
| 2011– | Guam | 16 | (0) |
- * Club domestic league appearances and goals ‡ National team caps and goals as of 14 August 2014

Christian Schweizer (born 6 January 1995) is a Guamanian international footballer.

== Career ==
Schweizer started his soccer career with seven years in the Robbie Webber Youth Soccer League for the Crushers Football Club of Hagåtña, Guam. In 2007 joined the youth team of the Wings Soccer Club, who played until 2009. In 2009 attended the St. John's School (Guam) and played besides for the Tamuning based youth soccer club Wings SC.

Schweizer started his Senior career in 2011 in the Guam Men's Soccer League for Fuji-Ichiban Espada FC.

=== International ===
He made his first appearance for the Guam national football team in 2011.
