= Mark Chargualaf =

Guamanian soccer player

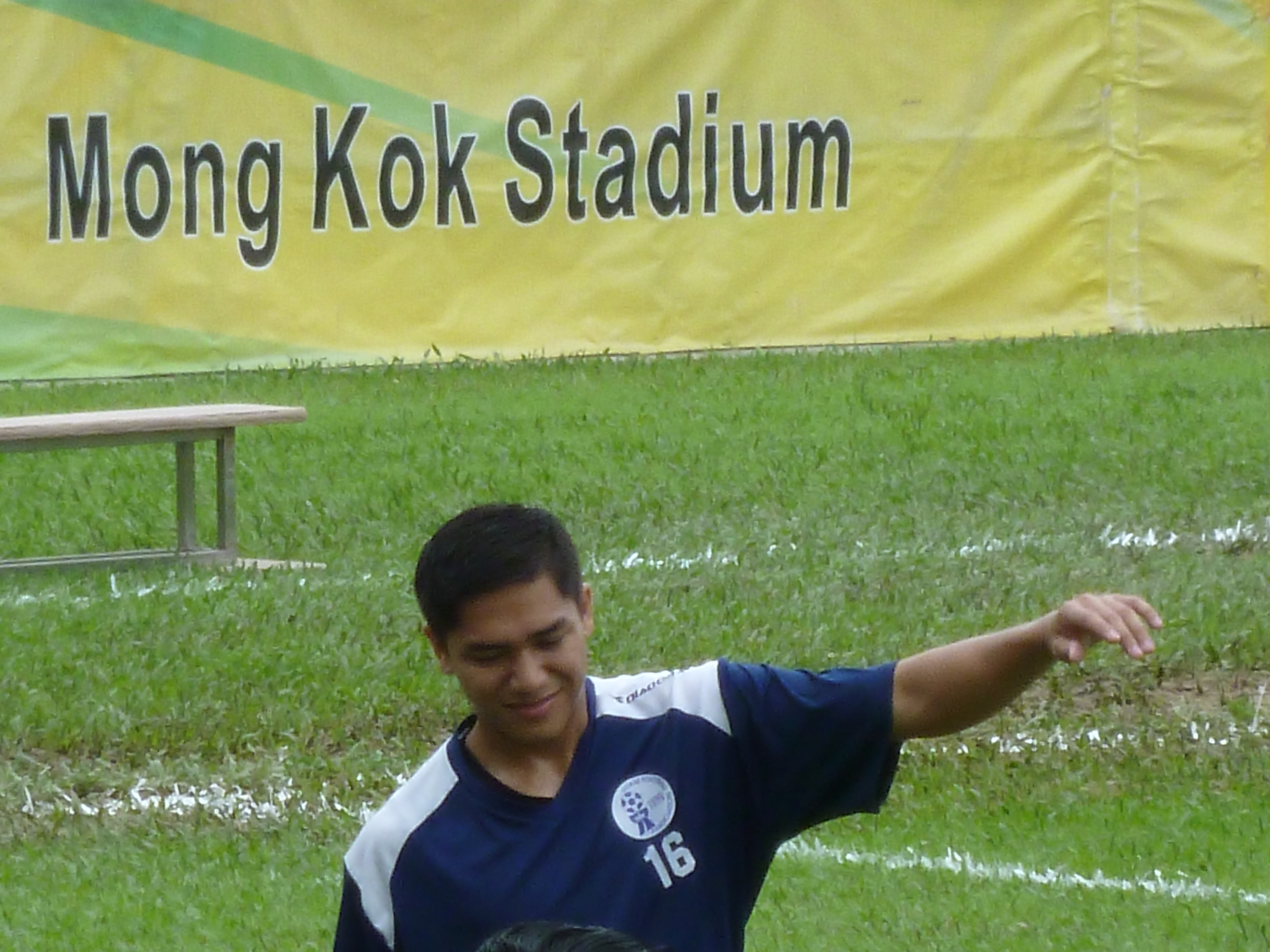

Personal information
- Full name: Mark Anthony Torres Chargualaf
- Date of birth: January 3, 1991 (age 35)
- Place of birth: Guam
- Position: Defender

Senior career*
Years	Team	Apps	(Gls)
2010–	Cars Plus FC		

International career^{‡}
2007–	Guam	36	(0)
- * Club domestic league appearances and goals ‡ National team caps and goals as of 13 June 2021

Mark Anthony Torres Chargualaf (born 3 January 1991) is a Guamanian soccer player who plays as a defender.
