= Elias Merfalen =

Guamanian footballer

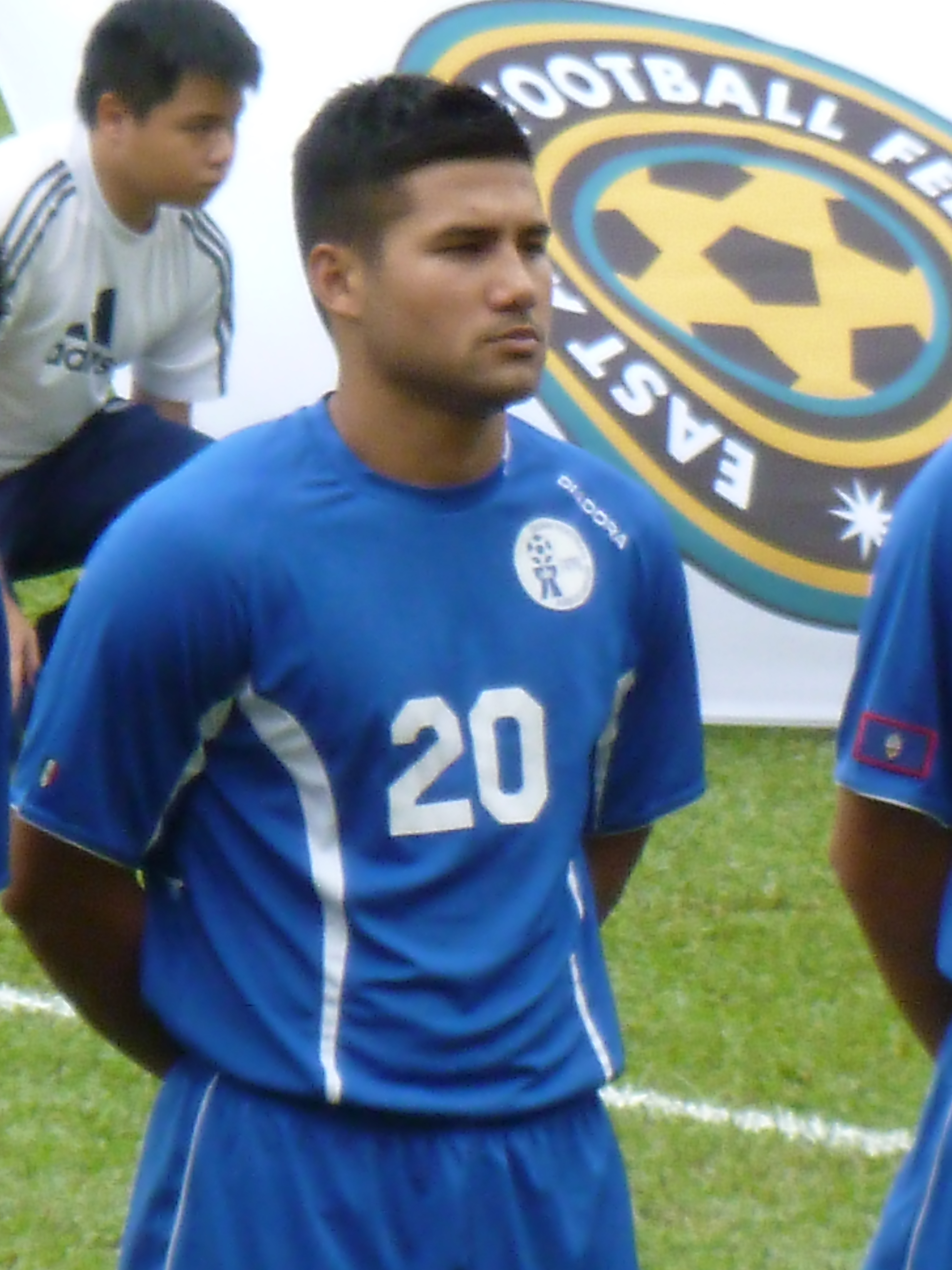

Personal information
- Full name: Elias Francis Merfalen
- Date of birth: 7 September 1989 (age 37)
- Place of birth: Tamuning, Guam
- Height: 1.75 m (5 ft 9 in)
- Position: Striker

Team information
- Current team: Table 35 Espada

Senior career*
Years	Team	Apps	(Gls)
2004	Guam U18		
2005–2009	Orange Crushers		
2009–2010	Guam Shipyard		
2010–2012	Cars Plus		
2013–	Table 35 Espada		

International career^{‡}
2005–	Guam	17	(2)
- * Club domestic league appearances and goals as of 3 December 2012 ‡ National team caps and goals as of 7 December 2012

Elias Francis Merfalen (born 7 September 1989 in Tamuning, Guam) is a Guamanian footballer who plays as a striker for Cars Plus.

He is also manager of the Guam national under-19 football team.

== Career statistics ==
=== International ===
Appearances and goals by national team and year
National team	Year	Apps	Goals
Guam	2005	4	0
Guam	2006	3	0
Guam	2007	5	1
Guam	2011	5	1
Guam	2012	2	1
Total		19	3

Scores and results list Guam's goal tally first, score column indicates score after each Merfalen goal.

List of international goals scored by Elias Merfalen
No.	Date	Venue	Opponent	Score	Result	Competition	Ref.
1	1 April 2007	Guam National Football Stadium, Hagåtña, Guam	Northern Mariana Islands	6–0	9–0	2008 East Asian Football Championship	
2	1 September 2011	Stade Rivière Salée, Nouméa, New Caledonia	American Samoa	2–0	2–0	2011 Pacific Games	
3	1 December 2012	Mong Kok Stadium, Kowloon, Hong Kong	Hong Kong	1–2	1–2	2013 EAFF East Asian Cup	
