= Thaddeus Atalig =

Guamanian footballer

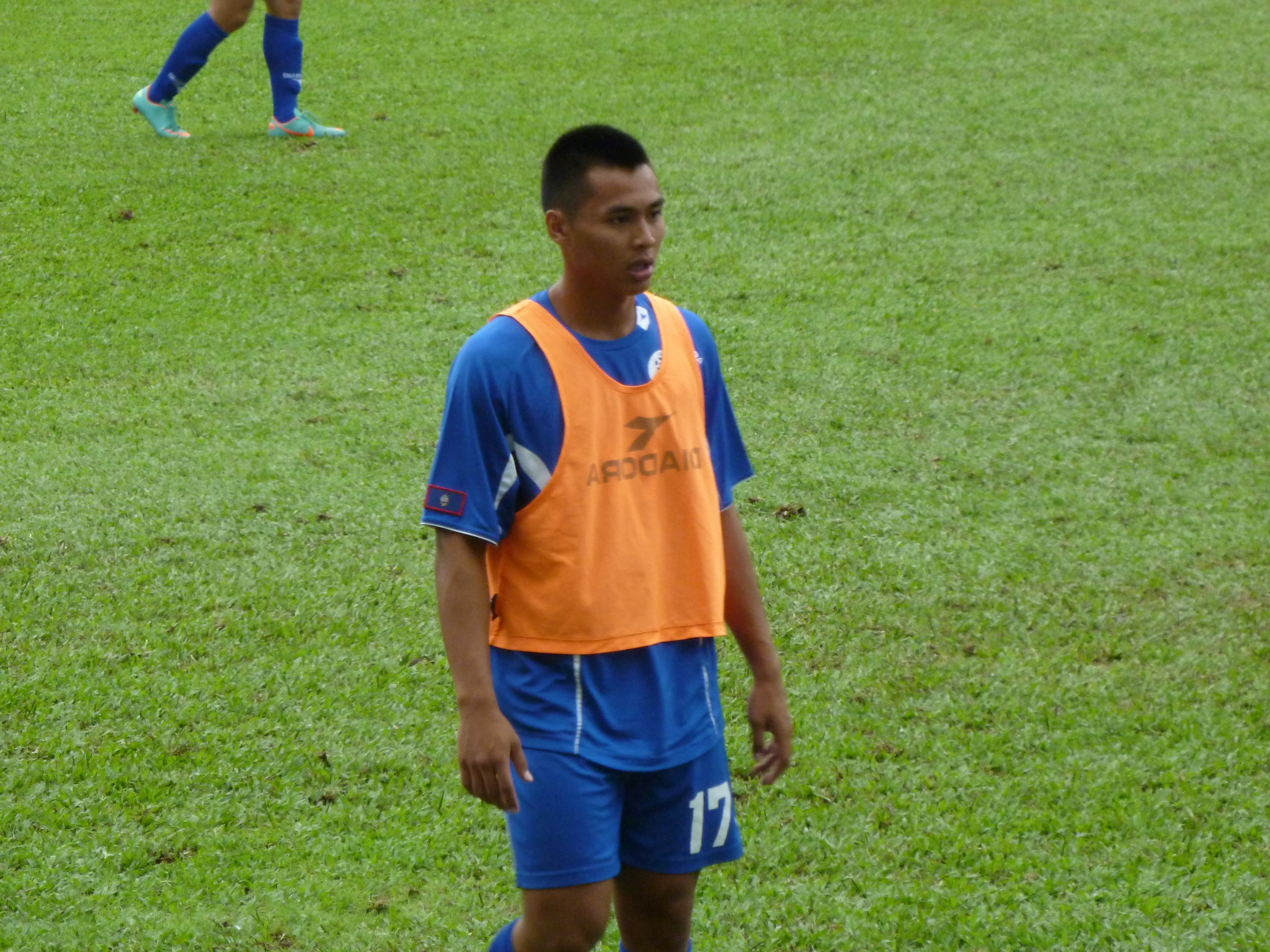

Personal information
- Full name: Thaddeus Joseph Cardines Atalig
- Date of birth: May 7, 1995 (age 31)
- Height: 1.70 m (5 ft 7 in)
- Position: Midfielder

Team information
- Current team: Fuji-Ichiban Espada
- Number: 18

Youth career
- 2009–2011: St. John's Knights
- 2013–: Bowling Green Falcons

Senior career*
Years	Team	Apps	(Gls)
2012	Fuji-Ichiban Espada		

International career^{‡}
2013	Guam U18	5	(1)
2012–2014	Guam	7	(0)
- * Club domestic league appearances and goals ‡ National team caps and goals as of 16 June 2023

Thaddeus Joseph Cardines Atalig (born 7 May 1995) is a Guamanian international footballer.

Atalig attended the St. John's School in Guam and played for the Knights soccer team, leading them to consecutive IIAAG Boys' Soccer League titles in his junior and senior years. He started in 2012 in the Budweiser Guam Men's Soccer League Division One for Fuji-Ichiban Espada.

Atalig earned a scholarship to play college soccer at Bowling Green Falcons.

== International ==
He made his first appearance for the Guam national football team in 2012.
