= Doug Herrick =

Guamanian footballer

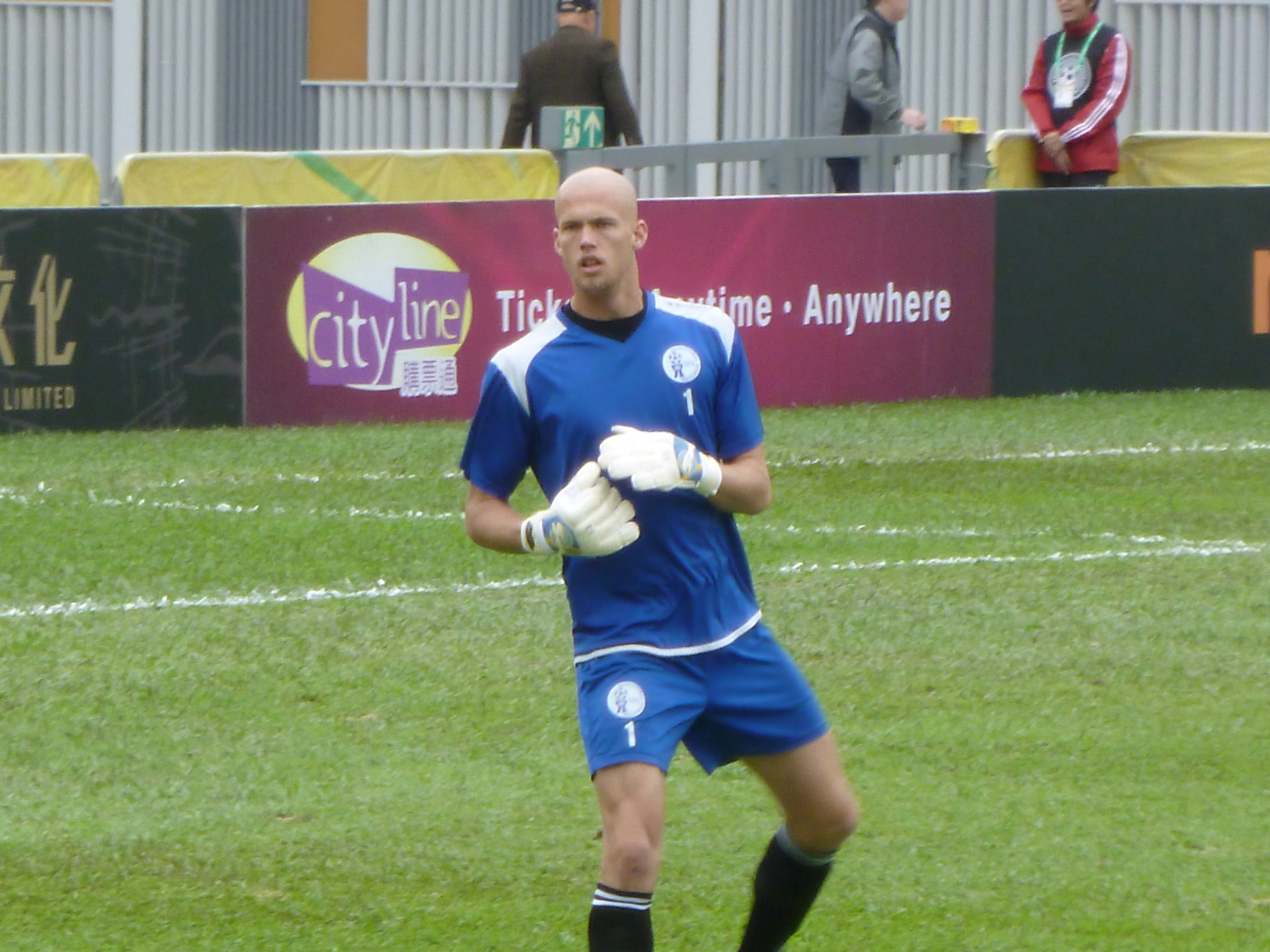

Personal information
- Full name: Douglas Herrick
- Date of birth: 2 June 1989 (age 37)
- Place of birth: Seattle, Washington, United States
- Height: 1.92 m (6 ft 3 1/2 in)
- Position: Goalkeeper

College career
Years	Team	Apps	(Gls)
2008–2011	Saint Mary's Gaels		

Senior career*
Years	Team	Apps	(Gls)
2010–2011	Washington Crossfire	19	(0)
2012	Seattle Sounders FC U-23	15	(0)
2013	MLS Pool		
2013	→ Seattle Sounders FC (loan)	0	(0)
2014	Charlotte Eagles	3	(0)
2015	Seattle Sounders FC U-23	1	(0)
2016–?	Rovers		

International career^{‡}
2012–2016	Guam	28	(0)
- * Club domestic league appearances and goals as of 2 October 2015 ‡ National team caps and goals as of 25 September 2016

Douglas Herrick (born 2 June 1989) is a Guamanian former international footballer. He played for the Guam national team.

After playing with the Seattle Sounders FC U-23 in the Premier Development League in 2012, he signed with Major League Soccer in 2013 to serve as a league emergency pool goalkeeper. As part of his signing, he would continue to train with Seattle Sounders FC and served as their backup for a match against the San Jose Earthquakes as Marcus Hahnemann was serving a suspension. He was released at the end of the season.

Today Herrick works in children's therapy and coaches for OL Reign Academy as their director of goalkeeping

After retiring, he joined Reign FC as goalkeeper coach in 2017.
