= 2013 EAFF East Asian Cup =

2013년 EAFF 동아시안컵

Tournament details
- Host country: South Korea
- City: Seoul
- Dates: 20–28 July
- Teams: 10 (from 2 sub-confederations)

Final positions
- Champions: Japan (1st title)
- Runners-up: China
- Third place: South Korea
- Fourth place: Australia

Tournament statistics
- Matches played: 6
- Goals scored: 21 (3.5 per match)
- Top scorer: (Japan) Yoichiro Kakitani (3 goals)
- Best player: (Japan) Hotaru Yamaguchi

The 2013 EAFF East Asian Cup was the 5th edition of this regional competition, the football championship of East Asia. Two preliminary competitions were held during 2012. Mongolia were suspended from the EAFF and could not compete in any EAFF competition until March 2014, whilst Australia accepted an invitation to take part.

== Preliminary round 1 ==
The first round of the Preliminary Competition was hosted by Guam between 18 and 22 July 2012. The winner of the group advanced to the second round.

- Times listed are UTC+10:00

Team	Pld	W	D	L	GF	GA	GD	Pts
Guam (H)	2	2	0	0	6	1	+5	6
Macau	2	1	0	1	5	4	+1	3
Northern Mariana Islands	2	0	0	2	2	8	−6	0

Source: EAFF
(H) Hosts

=== Matches ===
18 July 2012
16:00

Northern Mariana Islands	1–3	Guam
Miller 18'	Report	Cunliffe 25', 66', 90' (pen.)

Leo Palace Resort, Yona
Attendance: 450
Referee: Kim Dae-yong (Korea Republic)

20 July 2012
16:00

Northern Mariana Islands	1–5	Macau
Schuler 51'	Report	Chan Kin Seng 27', 55', 59'; Ho Man Hou 40'; Vernon 62'

Leo Palace Resort, Yona
Attendance: 150
Referee: Jumpei Iida (Japan)

22 July 2012
16:00

Guam	3–0	Macau
Cunliffe 15'; Lopez 22'; DeVille 90+3'	Report

Leo Palace Resort, Yona
Attendance: 1,000
Referee: Jumpei Iida (Japan)

=== Awards ===
Top Scorer	Most Valuable Player
(Guam) Jason Cunliffe	(Guam) Jason Cunliffe

=== Goals ===
4 goals

- (Guam) Jason Cunliffe

3 goals

- (Macau) Chan Kin Seng

1 goals

- (Guam) Zachary DeVille
- (Guam) Marcus Lopez
- (Macau) Ho Man Hou
- (Macau) Vernon
- (Northern Mariana Islands) Joe Wang Miller
- (Northern Mariana Islands) Kirk Schuler

== Preliminary round 2 ==
The second round of the preliminary competition was held in Hong Kong between 1 December and 9 December 2012. The winner of the group advanced to the final tournament.

=== Matches ===
- Times listed are UTC+8

Team	Pld	W	D	L	GF	GA	GD	Pts
Australia	4	3	1	0	19	1	+18	10
North Korea	4	3	1	0	16	2	+14	10
Hong Kong (H)	4	2	0	2	4	6	−2	6
Chinese Taipei	4	0	1	3	2	17	−15	1
Guam	4	0	1	3	2	17	−15	1

Source: EAFF
(H) Hosts
1 December 2012
14:30

Guam	1–2	Hong Kong
Merfalen 56'	Report	Chan Siu Ki 2', 17'

Mong Kok Stadium, Hong Kong
Attendance: 3,040
Referee: Kim Dae-yong (Korea Republic)
1 December 2012
17:10

Chinese Taipei	1–6	North Korea
Chen Hao-wei 79'	Report	An Il-bom 28'; Pak Song-chol 34'; Ri Kwang-hyok 42'; Pak Nam-chol 65'; Ri Myong-jun 67', 89'

Mong Kok Stadium, Hong Kong
Attendance: 3,040
Referee: Wang Zhe (China PR)

3 December 2012
17:50

North Korea	5–0	Guam
An Il-bom 25'; Ri Myong-jun 34', 59'; Pak Nam-chol 82'; Jong Il-gwan 87'	Report

Mong Kok Stadium, Hong Kong
Attendance: 4,160
Referee: Mongkolchai Pechsri (Thailand)
3 December 2012
20:30

Hong Kong	0–1	Australia
	Report	Emerton 85'

Mong Kok Stadium, Hong Kong
Attendance: 4,160
Referee: Jumpei Iida (Japan)

5 December 2012
17:50

Chinese Taipei	1–1	Guam
Lo Chih-an 90+2'	Report	Naputi 67'

Hong Kong Stadium, Hong Kong
Attendance: 989
Referee: Kim Dae-yong (Korea Republic)
5 December 2012
20:30

North Korea	1–1	Australia
An Yong-hak 64'	Report	Thompson 4'

Hong Kong Stadium, Hong Kong
Attendance: 989
Referee: Mongkolchai Pechsri (Thailand)

7 December 2012
17:50

Guam	0–9	Australia
	Report	Mooy 12'; Babalj 20', 56'; Marrone 43'; Thompson 59', 62', 65' (pen.); Milligan 71'; Garcia 83'

Hong Kong Stadium, Hong Kong
Attendance: 2,315
Referee: Wang Zhe (China PR)
7 December 2012
20:30

Hong Kong	2–0	Chinese Taipei
Chan Wai Ho 24'; Lee Hong Lim 25'	Report

Hong Kong Stadium, Hong Kong
Attendance: 2,315
Referee: Jumpei Iida (Japan)

9 December 2012
14:20

Hong Kong	0–4	North Korea
	Report	Pak Nam-chol 27'; Ryang Yong-gi 33'; Pak Nam-chol 36'; Pak Song-chol 85'

Hong Kong Stadium, Hong Kong
Attendance: 3,345
Referee: Mongkolchai Pechsri (Thailand)
9 December 2012
17:00

Australia	8–0	Chinese Taipei
Garcia 11'; Cornthwaite 17'; Taggart 19', 29'; Behich 34', 57'; Mooy 47'; Yang Chao-hsun 82' (o.g.)	Report

Hong Kong Stadium, Hong Kong
Attendance: 3,345
Referee: Kim Dae-yong (Korea Republic)

=== Awards ===
Top Scorer	Most Valuable Player
(North Korea) Ri Myong-jun	(Australia) Brett Emerton

=== Goals ===
4 goals

- (Australia) Archie Thompson
- (North Korea) Ri Myong-jun

3 goals

- (North Korea) Pak Nam-chol

2 goals

- (Australia) Eli Babalj
- (Australia) Aziz Behich
- (Australia) Richard García
- (Australia) Aaron Mooy
- (Australia) Adam Taggart
- (Hong Kong) Chan Siu Ki
- (North Korea) An Il-bom
- (North Korea) Pak Song-chol

1 goal

- (Australia) Robert Cornthwaite
- (Australia) Brett Emerton
- (Australia) Michael Marrone
- (Australia) Mark Milligan
- (Chinese Taipei) Chen Hao-wei
- (Chinese Taipei) Lo Chih-an
- (Guam) Elias Merfalen
- (Guam) Dylan Naputi
- (Hong Kong) Chan Wai Ho
- (Hong Kong) Lee Hong Lim
- (North Korea) An Yong-hak
- (North Korea) Jong Il-gwan
- (North Korea) Pak Nam-chol
- (North Korea) Ri Kwang-hyok
- (North Korea) Ryang Yong-gi

1 own goal

- (Chinese Taipei) Yang Chao-hsun

== Final tournament ==
=== Matches ===
The final stage of the tournament was played in South Korea between 20 and 28 July 2013.

- Times listed are UTC+9

Pos	Team	Pld	W	D	L	GF	GA	GD	Pts
1	Japan	3	2	1	0	8	6	+2	7
2	China	3	1	2	0	7	6	+1	5
3	South Korea (H)	3	0	2	1	1	2	−1	2
4	Australia	3	0	1	2	5	7	−2	1

Source: EAFF
(H) Hosts
20 July 2013
19:00

South Korea	0–0	Australia
	Report

Seoul World Cup Stadium, Seoul
Attendance: 31,571
Referee: Yuichi Nishimura (Japan)

21 July 2013
21:00

Japan	3–3	China
Kurihara 32'; Kakitani 59'; Kudo 60'	Report	Wang Yongpo 4' (pen.), 80' (pen.); Sun Ke 86'

Seoul World Cup Stadium, Seoul
Attendance: 3,500
Referee: Ben Williams (Australia)

24 July 2013
20:00

South Korea	0–0	China
	Report

Hwaseong Stadium, Hwaseong
Attendance: 23,675
Referee: Valentin Kovalenko (Uzbekistan)

25 July 2013
20:00

Japan	3–2	Australia
Saito 26'; Osako 56', 79'	Report	Duke 76'; Juric 78'

Hwaseong Stadium, Hwaseong
Attendance: 1,458
Referee: Tan Hai (China PR)

28 July 2013
17:15

Australia	3–4	China
Mooy 30'; Taggart 89'; Duke 90+3'	Report	Yu Dabao 5'; Sun Ke 56'; Yang Xu 87'; Wu Lei 88'

Seoul Olympic Stadium, Seoul
Attendance: 10,526
Referee: Kim Dong-jin (Korea Republic)

28 July 2013
20:00

South Korea	1–2	Japan
Yun Il-lok 33'	Report	Kakitani 24', 90+1'

Seoul Olympic Stadium, Seoul
Attendance: 47,258
Referee: Ben Williams (Australia)

=== Awards ===
Top Scorer	Most Valuable Player
(Japan) Yoichiro Kakitani	(Japan) Hotaru Yamaguchi

=== Goals ===
3 goals

- (Japan) Yoichiro Kakitani

2 goals

- (Australia) Mitchell Duke
- (China) Sun Ke
- (China) Wang Yongpo
- (Japan) Yuya Osako

1 goal

- (Australia) Adam Taggart
- (Australia) Tomi Juric
- (Australia) Aaron Mooy
- (China) Wu Lei
- (China) Yang Xu
- (China) Yu Dabao
- (Japan) Manabu Saito
- (Japan) Masato Kudo
- (Japan) Yuzo Kurihara
- (South Korea) Yun Il-lok

== Final standings ==
Rank	Team
1	Japan
2	China
3	South Korea
4	Australia
5	North Korea
6	Hong Kong
=7	Chinese Taipei
=7	Guam
9	Macau
10	Northern Mariana Islands

== Broadcasting ==
Territory	Broadcaster
(Arab League) Arab World	AD Sport
Australia	Fox Sports
Brazil	SporTV
Canada	TBA
China	CCTV 5
Europe	Eurosport
Hong Kong	Now TV
Japan	Fuji TV
Latin America	Fox Sports
New Zealand	TVNZ
South Korea	JTBC
Thailand	TrueVisions
United States	ESPN2

== Controversies ==
At the final match between South Korea and Japan on 28 July, South Korean fans booed the start of the Japanese anthem and later upped the political sloganeering with a banner that covered most of the width of one end of the ground that read, in Korean, "The nation that forgets history has no future." (Korean: 역사를 잊은 민족에게 미래는 없다), apparently aiming at the Japanese leaders' reluctance to admit to wrongdoings during its militaristic and colonial past, after they displayed huge pictures of Ahn Jung-geun, who assassinated the first prime minister of Japan and then-Japanese resident-general of Korea Itō Hirobumi in 1909, and Yi Sun-sin, a Korean naval commander who is famed for his victories against the Japanese navy during the Imjin War in the Joseon dynasty in the 16th century. The banner was not removed until Korea Football Association (KFA) directed supporters to do so after the first half of the match. After the banner was taken down, "Red Devils," a group of South Korean football supporters, refused to cheer on the national team in the second half. On its Facebook page, the Seoul sector of the Red Devils wrote that its members would not bang drums or chant songs for South Korea in protest of the decision by the KFA to remove the banner.

Kuniya Daini, President of Japan Football Association, said "We ask the East Asian Football Federation to thoroughly investigate the matter and act in the appropriate fashion," and Japanese Chief Cabinet Secretary Yoshihide Suga said the incident was "extremely regrettable" and the Japanese government "will respond appropriately based on FIFA rules when the facts are revealed.", while KFA said "We are still investigating the matter. We have no official statement now".

Japanese Sports Minister Hakubun Shimomura went further on Tuesday, saying the style of the banners called into question "the nature of the people" in South Korea.

The South Korean Ministry of Foreign Affairs then responded with a statement deploring Shimomura's "rude comments".

On 31 July, KFA issued a statement insisting that Japanese fans waving a large "rising sun" Japanese military flag had incited South Korean supporters.

Australia commitment to the ASEAN Football Federation is questioned due to its participation in this tournament while having not participated in a single edition of the AFF Championship, the top-level competition in the sub-confederation Australia which later became a member of in 2013.
