= Ian Adamos =

Guamanian footballer

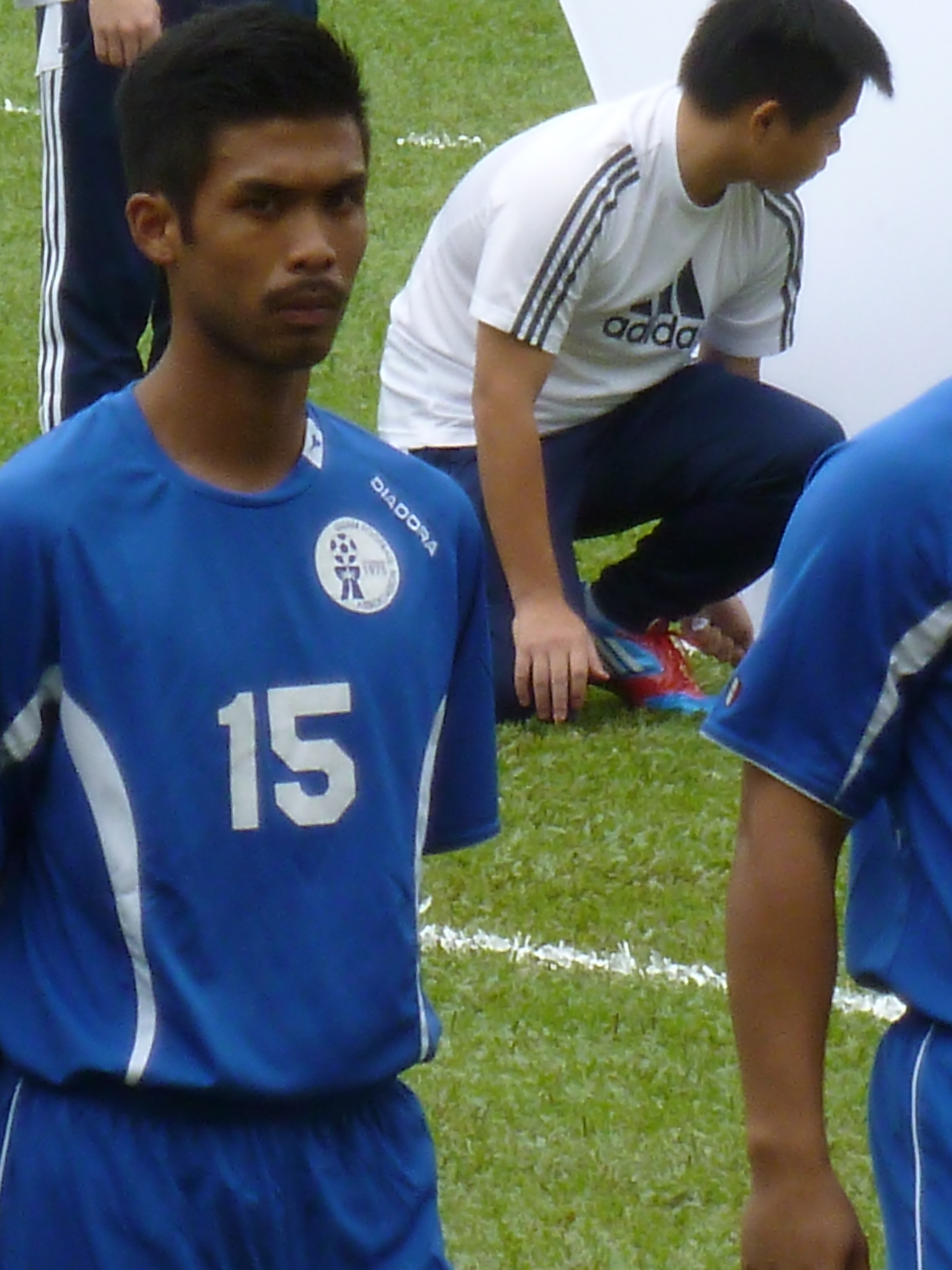

Personal information
- Full name: Ian James Adamos
- Date of birth: 3 April 1988 (age 38)
- Place of birth: San Diego, California, United States
- Height: 5 ft 9 in (1.75 m)
- Position: Midfielder

Team information
- Current team: SoCal Elite

Youth career
- 2004–2006: Morse Tigers

Senior career*
Years	Team	Apps	(Gls)
2007–2011	San Diego Flash		
2012	Global FC		
2012–	SoCal Elite		

International career
2012–2013	Guam	14	(0)
- * Club domestic league appearances and goals

Ian James Adamos (born 3 April 1988) is a professional footballer who plays as a midfielder. Born in San Diego, California, he represented Guam at international level.

== Club career ==
Adamos attended the Morse High School in San Diego, California and played for the Tigers soccer team. In 2006, he attended from the High School and started his soccer career with San Diego Flash. He then joined FIlipino side Global FC in January 2012, before signed in summer for American side SoCal Elite.

== International career ==
Adamos made his first appearance for the Guam national team in 2012.
