= Micah Paulino =

Guamanian soccer player

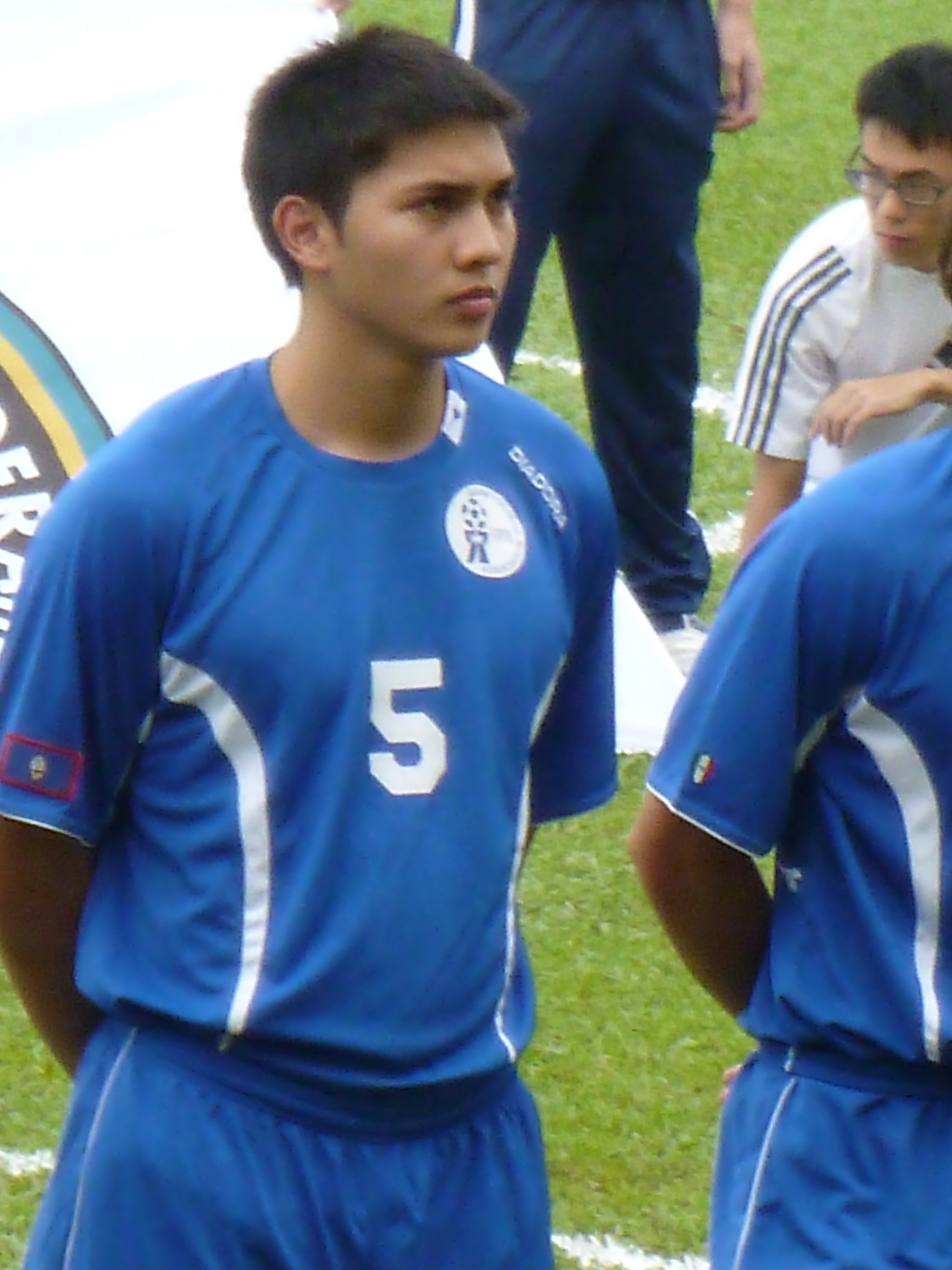

Personal information
- Full name: Micah Paulino
- Date of birth: November 16, 1992 (age 33)
- Place of birth: Guam
- Height: 1.80 m (5 ft 11 in)
- Position: Defender

Team information
- Current team: Niagara Purple Eagles
- Number: 16

College career
Years	Team	Apps	(Gls)
2011–2014	Niagara Purple Eagles		

Senior career*
Years	Team	Apps	(Gls)
2014–	Guam Shipyard		

International career^{‡}
2008–	Guam	26	(0)
- * Club domestic league appearances and goals ‡ National team caps and goals as of 25 September 2016

Micah Paulino is a Guamanian soccer player who plays as a defender for the American club the Niagara Purple Eagles and the Guam national team.
