= Zachary DeVille =

Guamanian footballer (born 1993)

Zach DeVille
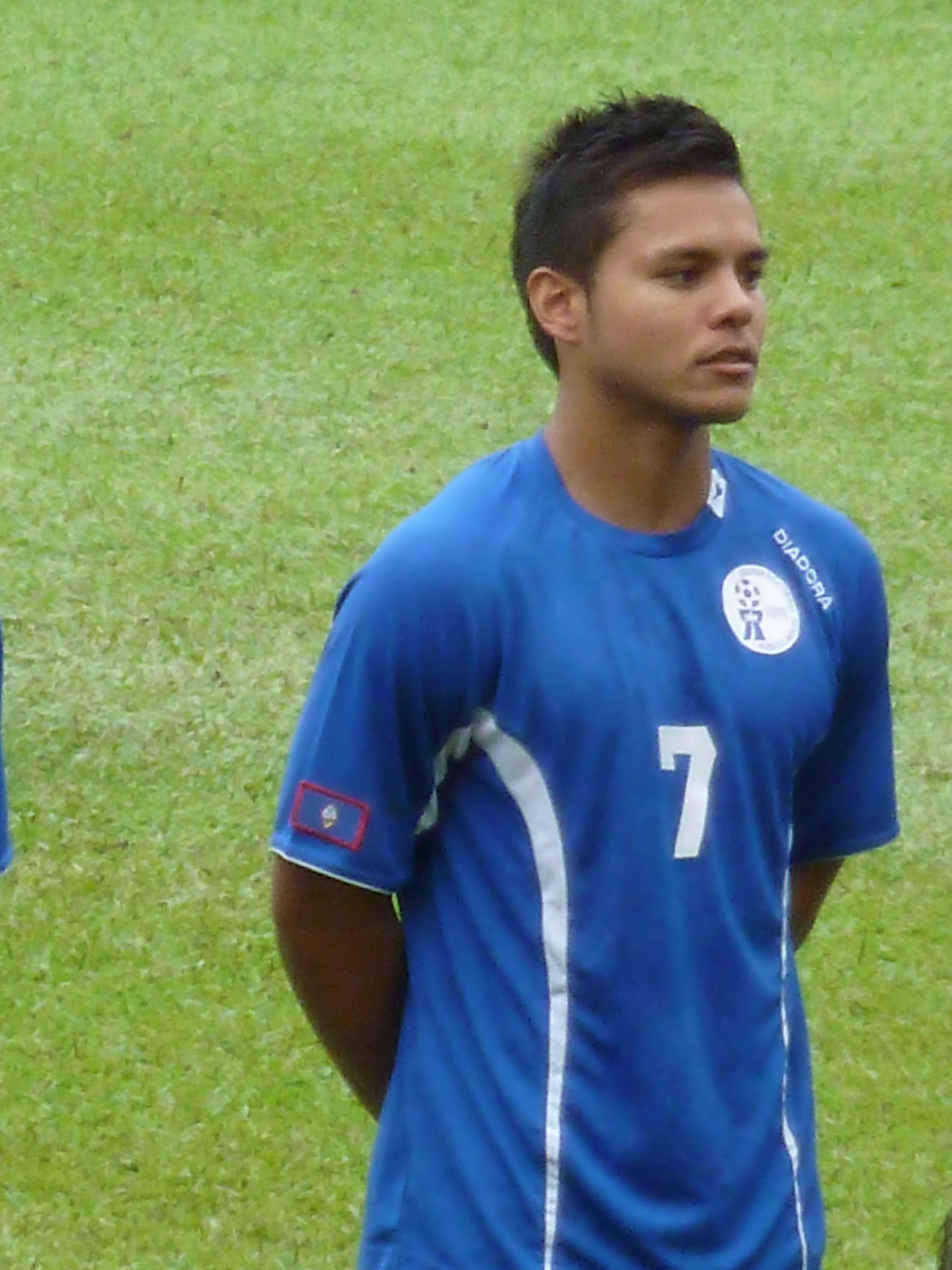

Personal information
- Full name: Zachary Thomas DeVille García
- Date of birth: March 23, 1993 (age 33)
- Place of birth: San Diego, California, United States
- Height: 5 ft 8 in (1.73 m)
- Position: Striker

Youth career
- 2008–2011: San Diego Surf

College career
Years	Team	Apps	(Gls)
2011–2013	Cal State Northridge Matadors		

Senior career*
Years	Team	Apps	(Gls)
2013–2017	San Diego Flash		

International career^{‡}
2012–2013	Guam	10	(2)
- * Club domestic league appearances and goals ‡ National team caps and goals as of 20:00, 2 March 2013 (UTC)

Zachary DeVille (born 23 March 1993 in San Diego, California, United States) is a former Guamanian international footballer who played for the Cal State Northridge Matadors and the Guam national team.

== Career ==
Deville played youth soccer for San Diego–based club Nott's Forest FC, not to be confused with Nottingham Forest.

In 2006 attended the St. Augustine Catholic High School in San Diego, California. After one year joined to the University City High School and played for the Centurions soccer team. Since 2008 played besides San Diego Surf as part of the US Soccer Development Academy. In August 2011 attended the Northridge University.

=== International ===
He made his first appearance for the Guam national football team in 2012.

== Career statistics ==
=== International ===
Appearances and goals by national team and year
National team	Year	Apps	Goals
Guam	2012	9	2
Guam	2013	1	0
Total		10	2

Scores and results list Guam's goal tally first, score column indicates score after each DeVille goal.

List of international goals scored by Zachary DeVille
No.	Date	Venue	Opponent	Score	Result	Competition	Ref.
1	22 July 2012	Yona, Guam	Macau	3–0	3–0	2013 EAFF East Asian Cup qualification	
2	29 September 2012	Rizal Memorial Stadium, Manila, Philippines	Macau	1–0	3–0	Friendly	
