= Chiu Chun Kit =

Hong Kong footballer

Chiu Chun Kit 趙俊傑
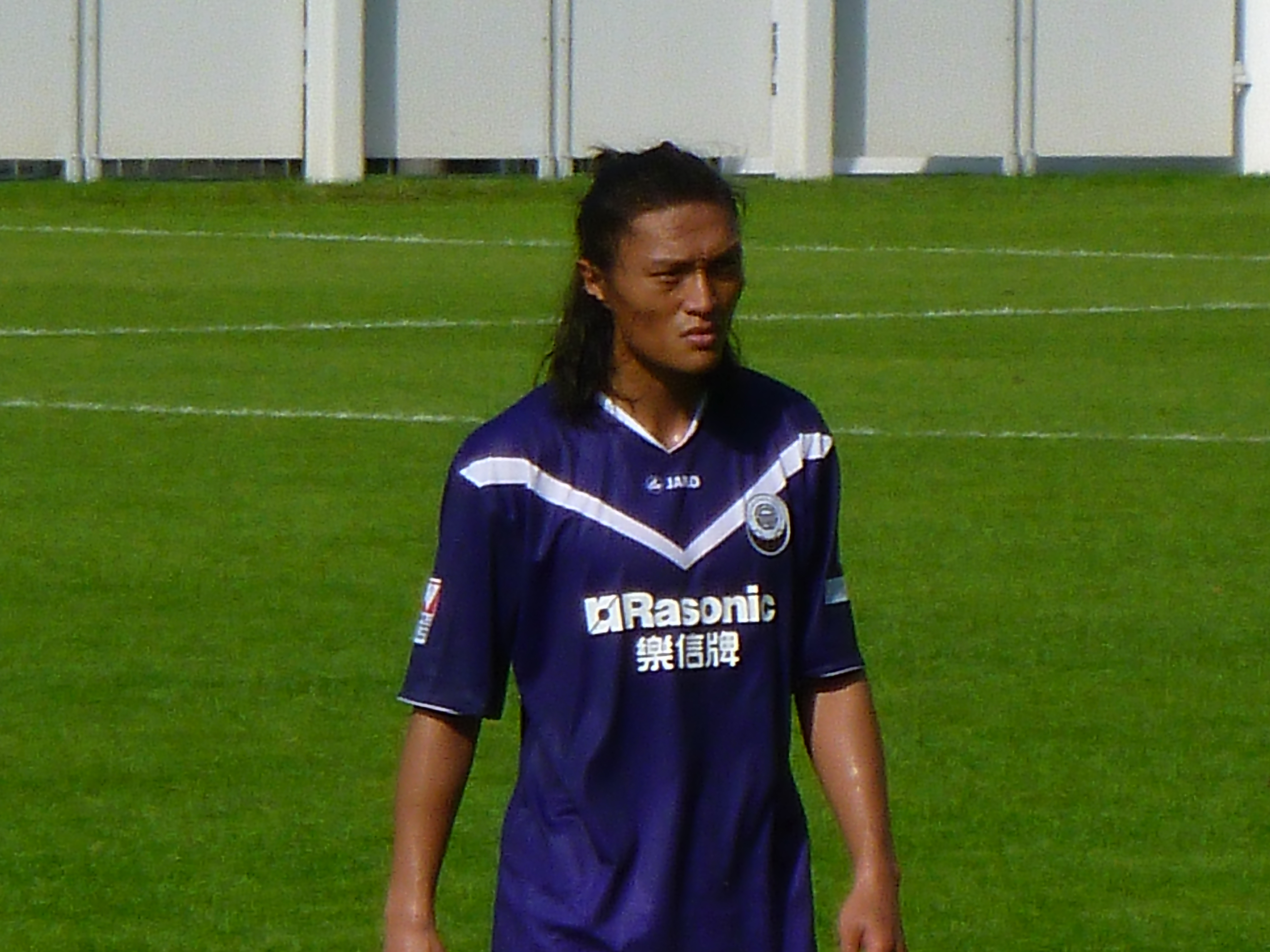

Personal information
- Full name: Chiu Chun Kit
- Date of birth: 4 October 1983 (age 43)
- Place of birth: Hong Kong
- Height: 1.85 m (6 ft 1 in)
- Position: Centre back

Youth career
- 1997: Instant-Dict

Senior career*
Years	Team	Apps	(Gls)
2000–2001	Orient & Yee Hope Union		
2001–2002	Double Flower		
2002–2005	Fukien		
2005–2006	Hong Kong Rangers	4	(0)
2006–2010	Tai Po	48	(0)
2010–2011	South China	5	(0)
2011–2013	Citizen	30	(0)
2013–2015	Yuen Long	32	(1)
2015–2016	Wong Tai Sin	16	(2)
2016–2017	Hong Kong Rangers	19	(2)
2017–2018	Lee Man	13	(1)
2018–2019	Hong Kong Rangers	12	(1)
2022–	Double Flower	27	(8)

International career
2012–2013	Hong Kong	2	(0)
- * Club domestic league appearances and goals as of 16 May 2026

Chiu Chun Kit (Chinese: 趙俊傑; Cantonese Yale: Jiuh Jeun Giht, born 4 October 1983) is a Hong Kong former professional footballer who played as a centre back.

== International career ==
Chiu made his international debut for Hong Kong on 14 November 2012 against Malaysia. He replaced Cheng Siu Wai in the 84th minute.

As of 6 February 2013

#	Date	Venue	Opponent	Result	Scored	Competition
1	14 November 2012	Shah Alam Stadium, Shah Alam, Malaysia	Malaysia	1–1	0	Friendly
2	6 February 2013	Pakhtakor Stadium, Tashkent, Uzbekistan	Uzbekistan	0–0	0	2015 AFC Asian Cup qualification
