= Jonahan Romero =

Soccer player (born 1988)

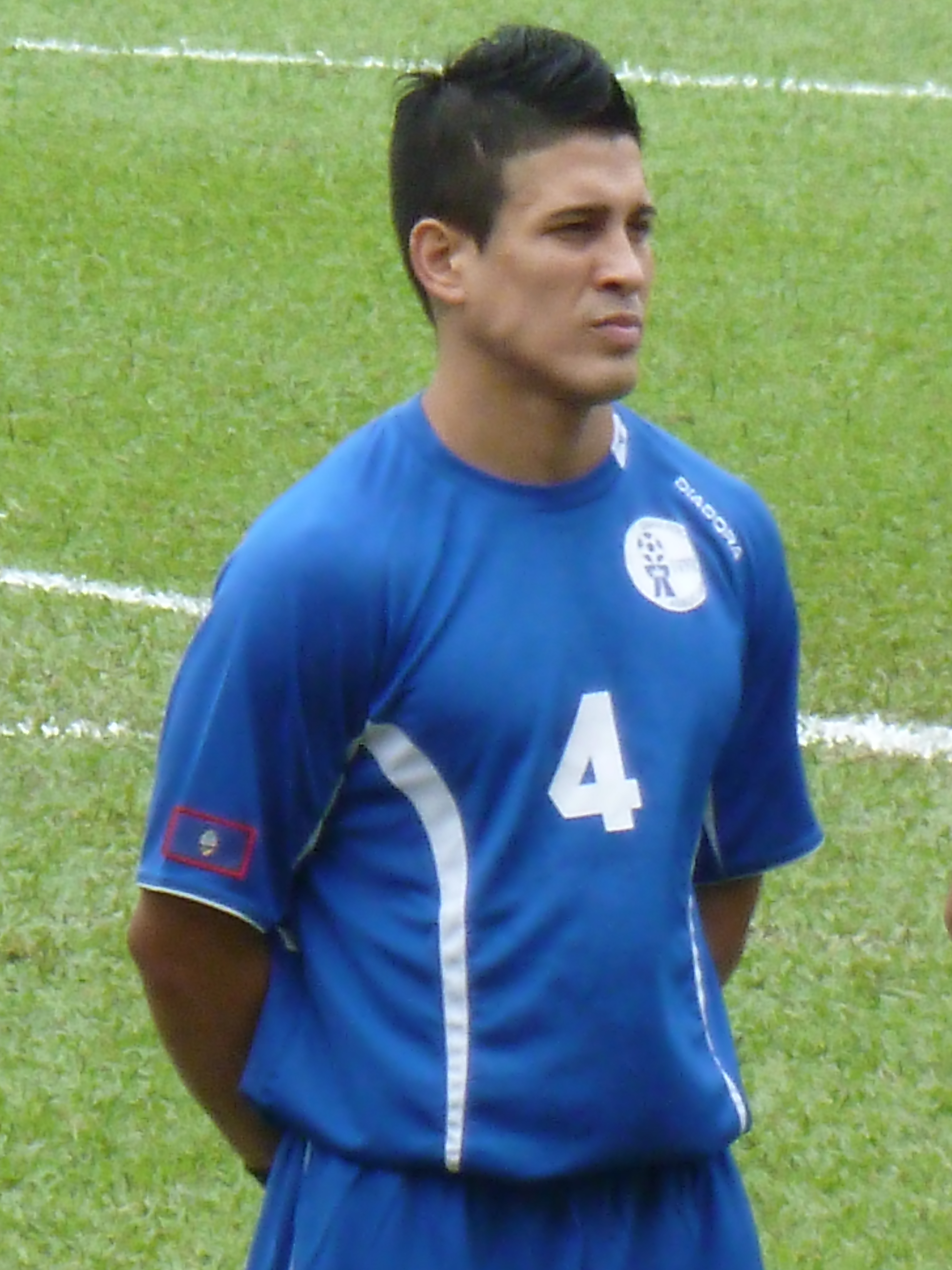
- Romero in 2012

Personal information
- Full name: Jonahan Artiga Romero
- Date of birth: 17 March 1988 (age 38)
- Place of birth: Fairfax, Virginia, United States
- Height: 5 ft 10 in (1.78 m)
- Positions: Midfielder; defender

Team information
- Current team: Rovers
- Number: 3

College career
Years	Team	Apps	(Gls)
2006–2007	Memphis Tigers		

Senior career*
Years	Team	Apps	(Gls)
2007–2008	Bayamón FC		
2008–2009	Puerto Rico Islanders		
2010	Joe Public FC		
2010	Cars Plus		
2011–2012	Kaya FC		
2013	Loyola		
2013–2014	Rovers FC		
2014–2015	Strykers FC		
2015–2016	Khoromkhon		
2016–	Rovers		

International career^{‡}
2013–2016	Guam	32	(0)
- * Club domestic league appearances and goals as of 14 August 2014 ‡ National team caps and goals as of 25 September 2016

Jonahan Artiga "Jonah" Romero (born 17 March 1988), is a soccer player who plays for Rovers FC in the Guam Soccer League. Born in the United States, he made 32 appearances the Guam national team.

== Early life and career ==
Jonahan was born in Fairfax, Virginia, to a Salvadoran father, Evelio Romero, and a Guamanian mother, Roxanna Artiga. Jonahan's father, who was a former professional footballer in his native El Salvador influenced him to pursue a football career. While growing up in Lorton, Virginia, he attended high school in Hayfield Secondary School where he became a wrestler for Roy Hill and a footballer for Daniel Drickey. He played two seasons for the University of Memphis, where he earned his Criminal Justice degree. He played 17 games for the Tigers coming off the bench.

Romero went on to play for Bayamon FC in Puerto Rico. After one year at Bayamon, he was transferred to Puerto Rico Islanders.

After one and a half years of playing football for the Islanders, he moved to his mother's native Guam, where he played for Cars Plus FC in the 2009–10 season. He was also listed in the lineup for the Guam national team. He decided to play in Trinidad and Tobago, in which he got only a six-month contract. He later moved back to Cars Plus and continued the season. After the 2010–11 season, he was signed by Kaya FC in the United Football League. He played in the 2011 United Football Cup, in which the team finished 4th place.

In 2015 Romero signed with defending Mongolian Premier league champions Khoromkhon FC in order to play in a consistent and challenging league to prepare himself for the upcoming world cup qualifiers. He also became the first Guamanian footballer to play in Mongolia.

As of September 2022, Romero is playing for United Premier Soccer League side SYC United in his native Virginia.

== Personal life ==
Romero is married to Courtney May. The couple have a 2 year old daughter Izabel, and share two kids from a previous relationship, Camila 6 and Sebastian 8.He was a teacher at Holy Family Catholic School for one school year.

== Honours ==
Kaya

- United Football League: Runner-up 2011–12
- PFF National Men's Club Championship : Third place 2013

Loyola

- UFL Cup: 2013

Rovers FC

- Guam Men's Soccer League: 2013–14
- Guam FA Cup: 2014
