= Dylan Naputi =

Guamanian footballer (born 1995)

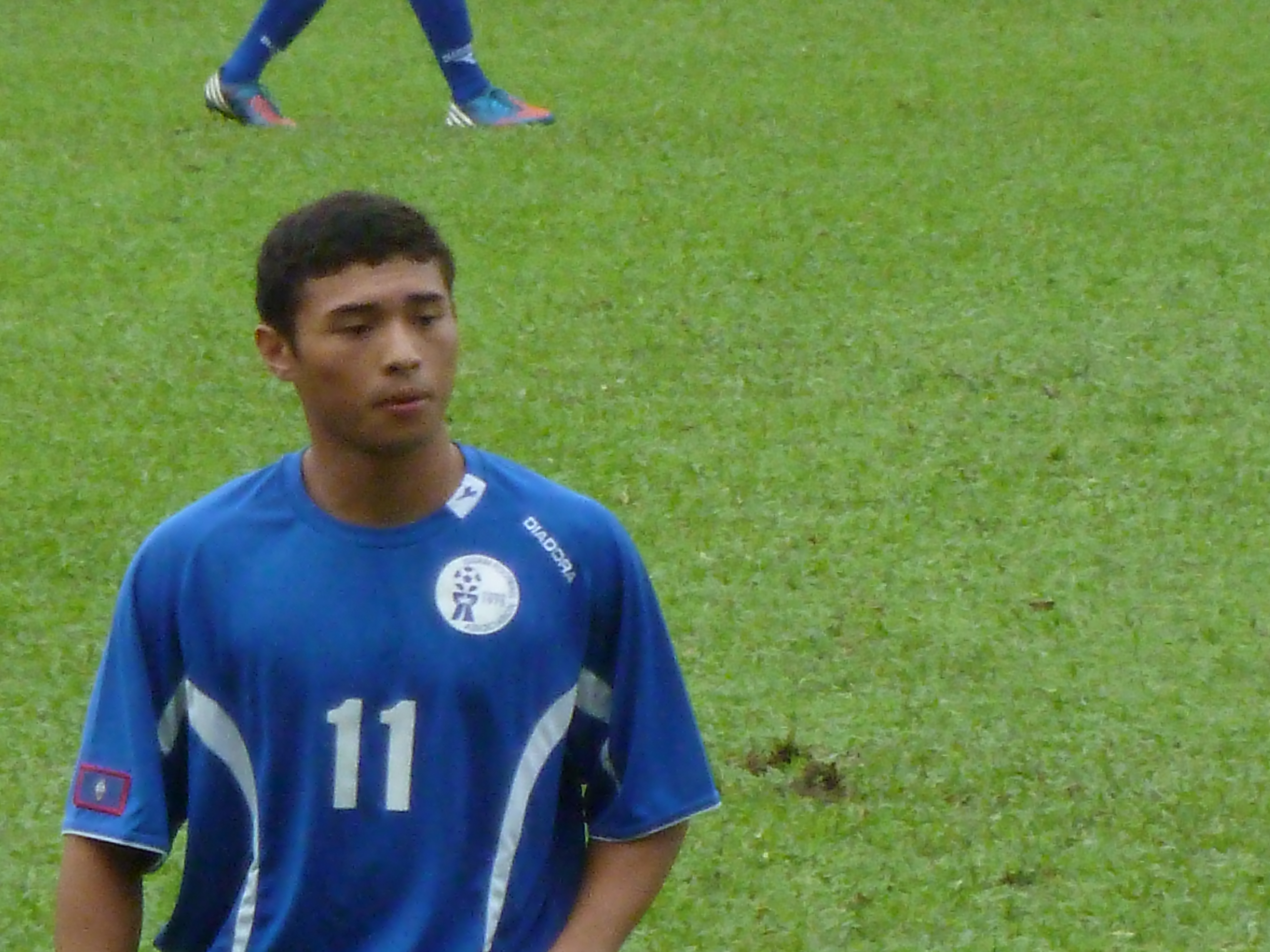

Personal information
- Full name: Dylan Pinaula Naputi
- Date of birth: January 4, 1995 (age 31)
- Place of birth: Barrigada, Guam
- Height: 1.65 m (5 ft 5 in)
- Position: Midfielder

Team information
- Current team: Ventura County Fusion
- Number: 11

Youth career
- 2009–2011: GW Geckos

Senior career*
Years	Team	Apps	(Gls)
2017-2020	University of Guam Tritons		
2016–	Ventura County Fusion		

International career^{‡}
2013–	Guam U-18	5	(0)
2011–	Guam	35	(4)
- * Club domestic league appearances and goals ‡ National team caps and goals as of January 4, 2020

Dylan Pinaula Naputi (born January 4, 1995) is a Guamanian international soccer player.

== Career ==
Naputi began his soccer career with Quality Distributors FC in the Guam Men's Soccer League while attending George Washington High School in Barrigada, Guam. After his graduation in 2013, he transferred to Payless Supermarket Strykers FC.

On January 5, 2016, Naputi joined the PDL side, Ventura County Fusion.

== International ==
He made his first appearance for the Guam national football team in 2011.

=== International goals ===
Scores and results list the Guam's goal tally first.

#	Date	Venue	Opponent	Score	Result	Competition
1.	September 1, 2011	Terrain football Riviere-Salée, Noumea	American Samoa	1–0	2–0	2011 Pacific Games
2.	September 29, 2012	Rizal Memorial Stadium, Manila	Macau	1–0	3–0	2012 Philippine Peace Cup
3.	December 5, 2012	Hong Kong Stadium, Hong Kong	Chinese Taipei	1–0	1–1	2013 EAFF East Asian Cup
