= Scott Guerrero =

Guamanian footballer

Scott Leon Guerrero
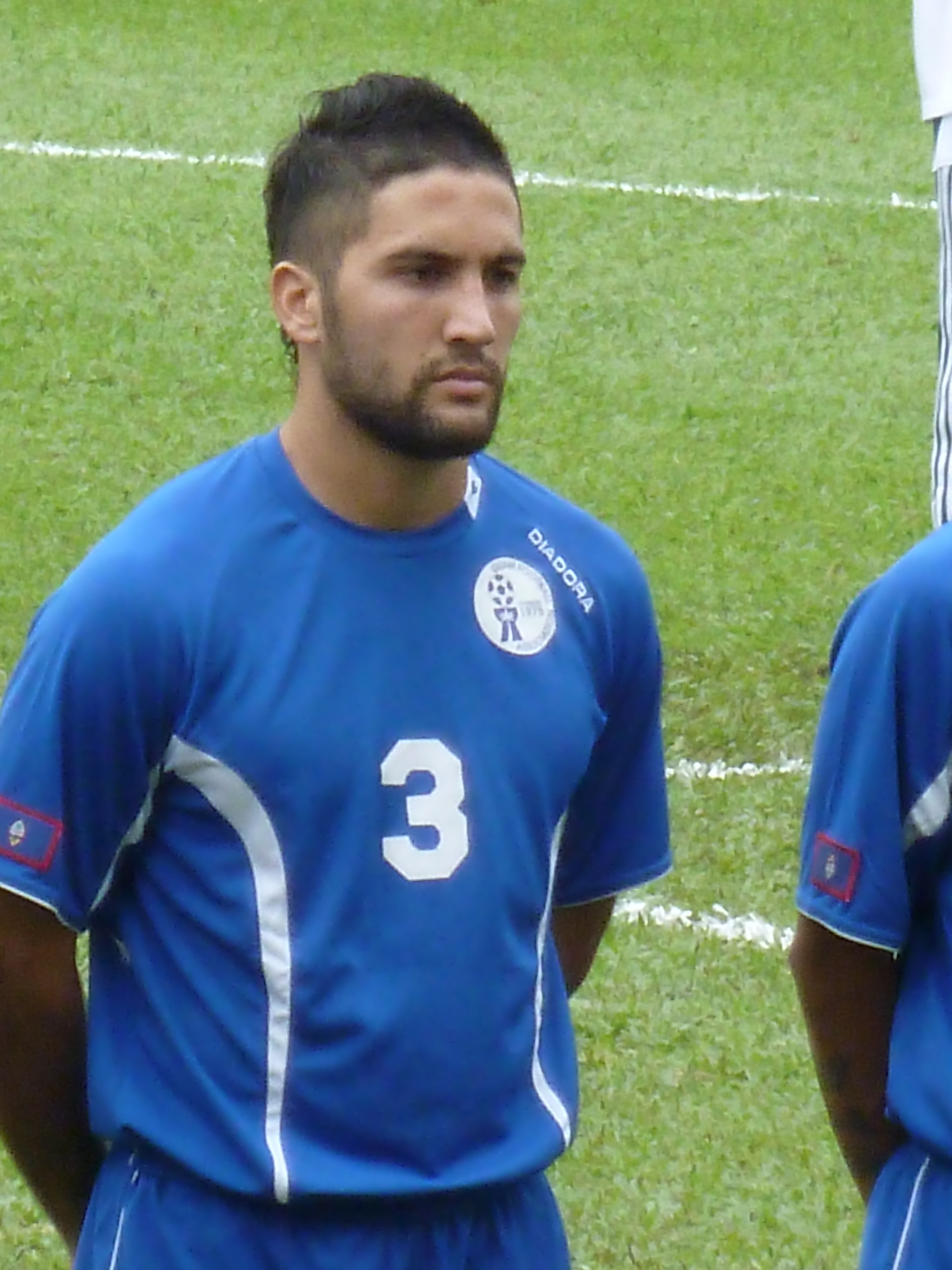

Personal information
- Full name: Scott Leon Guerrero
- Date of birth: August 22, 1990 (age 36)
- Place of birth: Tamuning, Guam
- Position: Defender

Team information
- Current team: Quality Distributors

Senior career*
Years	Team	Apps	(Gls)
2007–2008	Islanders		
2008	Loyola Marymount Lions	2	(0)
2008–2012	Fuji Ichiban Espada		
2012–	Quality Distributors		

International career^{‡}
2007–2016	Guam	21	(0)
- * Club domestic league appearances and goals ‡ National team caps and goals as of 25 September 2016

Scott Leon Guerrero is a Guamanian footballer who plays as a defender for Quality Distributors.
