= Yang Chao-hsun =

Taiwanese footballer

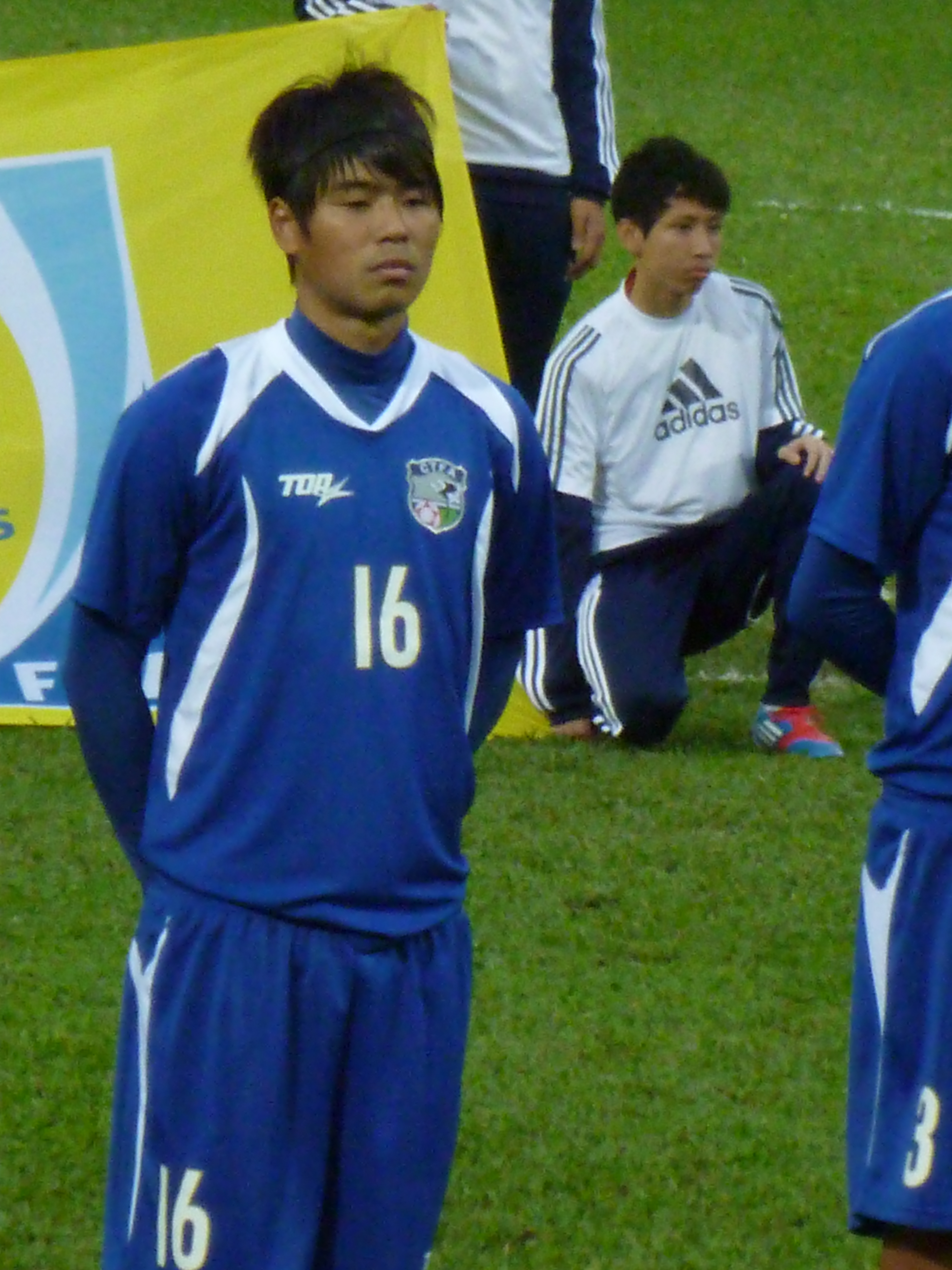

Personal information
- Full name: Yang Chao-hsun
- Date of birth: October 18, 1987 (age 39)
- Position: Defender

Senior career*
Years	Team	Apps	(Gls)
2006–2009	Pei Men High School		
2010	Taiwan PE College		
2011	NSTC		
2012–	Tainan City FC		

International career^{‡}
2010–	Chinese Taipei	8	(1)
- * Club domestic league appearances and goals ‡ National team caps and goals as of 9 January 2013

Yang Chao-hsun (Chinese: 楊朝勛) is a Taiwanese footballer who plays as a defender.
