= List of people from the Northern Mariana Islands =

Flag of the Northern Mariana Islands

An incomplete list of notable people have lived in or come from Northern Mariana Islands.

== Actors ==
- Ayra Mariano

== Business ==
- Vicente Camacho
- Larry Hillblom
- Jose Camacho Tenorio

== Educators ==
- Elizabeth Diaz Rechebei
- Don A Farrell
- Valentine Namio Sengebau
- Gonzalo Santos

== Lawyers and judges ==
- Gilbert Birnbrich
- Jesus Borja
- Edward Buckingham
- Joe Camacho
- Miguel S. Demapan
- Matthew Gregory
- Alfred Laureta
- Edward Manibusan
- Alex R. Munson
- Joey San Nicolas
- Ramona Villagomez Manglona

== Military ==
- David Borja

== Politics ==
- Francisco Ada
- James Ada
- Pedro Agulto Tenorio
- David M. Apatang
- Juan Babauta
- Sheila Babauta
- Diego Benavente
- Carlos S. Camacho
- Luis John Castro
- Francisco Dela Cruz
- Edith DeLeon Guerrero
- Larry DeLeon Guerrero Jr.
- Lorenzo I. De Leon Guerrero
- Ramon Deleon Guerrero
- Angel Demapan
- Carmen Fernandez
- Benigno Fitial
- Josie Fitial
- Donald Flores
- Juan Pan Guerrero
- Heinz Hofschneider
- Jude Hofschneider
- Victor Hocog
- Alice Santos Igitol
- Eloy Inos
- Rita Inos
- Karl King-Nabors
- Corina Magofna
- Benjamin Manglona
- Paul Manglona
- Janet Maratita
- Joseph M. Mendiola
- Misael H. Ogo
- Felicidad Ogumoro
- Edward Pangelinan
- Maria Frica Pangelinan
- Franz Reksid
- Jose Santos Rios
- Gregorio Sablan
- Jesus Sablan
- Tina Sablan
- Vinnie Sablan
- Teresita Santos
- Leila Staffler
- Tina Stege
- Froilan Tenorio
- Pedro Tenorio
- Kantoku Teruya
- Ralph Torres
- Juan B. Tudela
- Marian Tudela
- Edmund Villagomez
- Timothy Villagomez

== Religious figures ==
- Tomas Aguon Camacho
- Jayatirtha Dasa
- Ryan Jimenez

== Sportspeople ==
=== Association football ===
- Taka Borja
- Enrico del Rosario
- Euly Ermitanio
- Lucas Knecht
- Johann Noetzel
- Dai Podziewski
- Richard Steele
- Nicolas Swaim
- Sunjoon Tenorio
- Joe Wang Miller
- Daniel Westphal

=== Athletics ===
- Rachel Abrams
- Mamiko Oshima-Berger
- Yvonne Bennett
- Clayton Kenty
- Joe Wang Miller
- Beouch Ngirchongor
- Orrin Ogumoro Pharmin
- Jon Sakovich
- Zarinae Sapong
- Rezne Wong

=== Basketball ===
- Jericho Cruz

=== Martial arts ===
- Frank Camacho

=== Tennis ===
- Colin Sinclair
- Carol Young Suh Lee

== Other ==
- Aghurubw
- Theresa H. Arriola
- Chailang Palacios
