= Northern Mariana Islands national football team results =

This is a list of all the recorded matches played by the Northern Mariana Islands national football team, which represents the Commonwealth of the Northern Mariana Islands in international men's football. The team is controlled by the governing body for football in the Northern Mariana Islands, the Northern Mariana Islands Football Association, which is a member of the East Asian Football Federation (EAFF) and since December 2020 a full member of the Asian Football Confederation (AFC).

The federation is not a member of the world governing body FIFA and so whilst the national team is eligible to enter AFC and EAFF-run competitions, they are currently ineligible for global competitions such as the FIFA World Cup and FIFA Confederations Cup. As such, they do not have an official FIFA ranking. However, the team have been consistently ranked as one of the worst teams in the world on the Elo ratings and were in fact, in July 2016 rated as the worst men's senior international team in the world in a ratings system that also includes a number of other non-FIFA teams.

Following the completion of the preliminary qualifying round for the 2019 EAFF E-1 Football Championship the team have won only one official competitive match against international opposition and have a goal difference of −60 in official matches. The team have never qualified for the finals of a major tournament and beyond friendlies and qualifying matches, their only official competition has been in an exhibition tournament in the regional Micronesian Games in 1998, which they won, to date their only tournament success.

== Key ==
Key to matches

- Att.=Match attendance
- (H)=Home ground
- (A)=Away ground
- (N)=Neutral ground

Key to record by opponent

- Pld=Games played
- W=Games won
- D=Games drawn
- L=Games lost
- GF=Goals for
- GA=Goals against

== Results ==
Northern Mariana Islands's score is shown first in each case.

No.	Date	Venue	Opponents	Score	Competition	Northern Mariana Islands scorers	Att.	Ref.
2	30 July 1998	Emmaus High School Field, Koror	Guam	1–2	1998 Micronesian Games	Unknown	—	
3	31 July 1998	Emmaus High School Field, Koror	Palau	12–1	1998 Micronesian Games	Unknown	—	
5	3 August 1998	Emmaus High School Field, Koror	Guam	3–0	1998 Micronesian Games	Kewo, Guerrero (2)	—	
6	12 July 1999	Yap	Micronesia	0–7	1999 Micronesian Cup		—	
7	25 March 2007	Oleai Sports Complex, Saipan	Guam	2–3	2008 East Asian Football Championship	McDonald (2)	—	
8	1 April 2007	Guam National Football Stadium, Hagåtña	Guam	0–9	2008 East Asian Football Championship		1,324	
9	27 April 2008	Oleai Sports Complex, Saipan	Guam	2–3	Marianas Cup	Miller, McKagen	—	
10	11 March 2009	Leo Palace Resort, Yona	Macau	1–6	2010 East Asian Football Championship	Miller	—	
11	13 March 2009	Leo Palace Resort, Yona	Guam	1–2	2010 East Asian Football Championship	Loken	765	
12	15 March 2009	Leo Palace Resort, Yona	Mongolia	1–4	2010 East Asian Football Championship	Swaim	700	
13	19 June 2010	Oleai Sports Complex, Saipan	Guam	1–1	Marianas Cup	Miller	—	
14	18 July 2012	Leo Palace Resort, Yona	Guam	1–3	2013 EAFF East Asian Cup	Miller	450	
15	20 July 2012	Leo Palace Resort, Yona	Macau	1–5	2013 EAFF East Asian Cup	Schuler	150	
16	24 November 2012	Guam	Guam	0–8	Marianas Cup		—	
17	2 March 2013	Dasarath Rangasala Stadium, Kathmandu	Nepal	0–6	2014 AFC Challenge Cup qualification		17,000	
18	4 March 2013	Dasarath Rangasala Stadium, Kathmandu	Palestine	0–9	2014 AFC Challenge Cup qualification		2,700	
19	6 March 2013	Dasarath Rangasala Stadium, Kathmandu	Bangladesh	0–4	2014 AFC Challenge Cup qualification		2,000	
20	21 July 2014	GFA National Training Center, Dededo	Mongolia	0–4	2015 EAFF East Asian Cup		—	
21	23 July 2014	GFA National Training Center, Dededo	Macau	2–1	2015 EAFF East Asian Cup	Swaim, Schuler	—	
22	25 July 2014	GFA National Training Center, Dededo	Guam	0–5	2015 EAFF East Asian Cup		—	
23	30 June 2016	GFA National Training Center, Dededo	Chinese Taipei	1–8	2017 EAFF E-1 Football Championship	Schuler	—	
24	2 July 2016	GFA National Training Center, Dededo	Macau	1–3	2017 EAFF E-1 Football Championship	Griffin	—	
25	4 July 2016	GFA National Training Center, Dededo	Mongolia	0–8	2017 EAFF E-1 Football Championship		—	
26	2 September 2018	MFF Football Centre, Ulaanbaatar	Guam	0–4	2019 EAFF E-1 Football Championship		105	
27	4 September 2018	MFF Football Centre, Ulaanbaatar	Mongolia	0–9	2019 EAFF E-1 Football Championship		2,021	
28	6 September 2018	MFF Football Centre, Ulaanbaatar	Macau	1–1	2019 EAFF E-1 Football Championship	Tenorio	17	
29	19 February 2022	Guam National Football Stadium, Hagåtña	Guam	0–2	Friendly		—	
30	22 February 2022	Guam National Football Stadium, Hagåtña	Guam	2–3	Friendly	Unsa, Borja	—	
31	18 November 2023	SIFF Academy Field, Honiara (N)	Fiji	0–10	2023 Pacific Games		—	
32	24 November 2023	SIFF Academy Field, Honiara (N)	Tahiti	0–5	2023 Pacific Games		—	
33	27 November 2023	SIFF Academy Field, Honiara (N)	American Samoa	4–0	2023 Pacific Games	Yobech, R. Guerrero (2), Ngewakl		
34	30 November 2023	SIFF Academy Field, Honiara (N)	Tuvalu	1–4	2023 Pacific Games	Toves		
35	6 April 2024	Northern Mariana Islands Soccer Training Center, Saipan	Guam	2–2	Friendly	Toves, unknown (o.g.)	—	
36	7 April 2024	Northern Mariana Islands Soccer Training Center, Saipan	Guam	2–1	Friendly	Narvaez Jr., Lizama	—	
37	21 December 2024	Northern Mariana Islands Soccer Training Center, Saipan	Guam	1–2	Friendly	Bechani	—	
38	22 December 2024	Northern Mariana Islands Soccer Training Center, Saipan	Guam	0–8	Friendly		—	

Notes

1. A: Northern Mariana Islands played six matches at the 1998 Micronesian Games, however only three were against full international sides. The other matches against Pohnpei, Yap and Palau B is considered an unofficial matches.

== Record by opponent ==
Up to matches played on 22 December 2024.

Team	Pld	W	D	L	GF	GA	GD	WPCT
American Samoa	1	1	0	0	4	0	+4	100.00
Bangladesh	1	0	0	1	0	4	−4	0.00
Chinese Taipei	1	0	0	1	1	8	−7	0.00
Fiji	1	0	0	1	0	10	−10	0.00
Guam	17	2	2	13	19	58	−39	11.76
Macau	5	1	1	3	6	16	−10	20.00
Micronesia	1	0	0	1	0	7	−7	0.00
Mongolia	4	0	0	4	1	25	−24	0.00
Nepal	1	0	0	1	0	6	−6	0.00
Palau	1	1	0	0	12	1	+11	100.00
Palestine	1	0	0	1	0	9	−9	0.00
Tahiti	1	0	0	1	0	5	−5	0.00
Tuvalu	1	0	0	1	1	4	−3	0.00
Total	36	5	3	28	44	153	−109	13.89

Source: Results
