= Markus Toves =

Northern Marianas footballer

Personal information
- Full name: Markus Joaquin Attao Toves
- Date of birth: 27 May 2007 (age 19)
- Place of birth: Northern Mariana Islands
- Height: 1.77 m (5 ft 10 in)
- Position: Midfielder

Team information
- Current team: Tuloy
- Number: 42

Youth career
- 2016–2021: Kanoa

Senior career*
Years	Team	Apps	(Gls)
2021–2025	Kanoa		
2021–2022	→ Teen Ayuyu (loan)		
2026–	Tuloy	12	(1)

International career^{‡}
2023–	Northern Mariana Islands	6	(2)
- * Club domestic league appearances and goals ‡ National team caps and goals as of 19:44, 25 May 2026 (UTC)

Markus Toves is a Northern Mariana Islands international footballer who currently plays for Tuloy of the Philippines Football League, and the Northern Mariana Islands national team. When he signed a contract with Tuloy in January 2026, he became the first professional footballer from the Northern Mariana Islands.

== Club career ==
Toves had played for the academy teams of Kanoa FC since at least 2016. He was among the top scorers in the under-12 division in 2017. In 2019, he helped the club win the U15 league championship. Toves and Kanoa repeated the feat in 2021. When the same league was suspended because of the COVID-19 pandemic in 2020, Toves was tied with Kohtaro Goto as the league's top scorer with eight goals in five matches.

In 2021, Toves played for the U17 national team, known as the Teen Ayuyus, in the Marianas Soccer League 1. He remained with the club through 2022. By 2023, Toves had returned Kanoa FC in MSL1. The club won the league championship for the spring 2024 season with Toves as the league's top scorer with fourteen goals.

In January 2026, it was announced that Toves had signed a professional contract with Tuloy FC of the Philippines Football League. By doing so, he became the first-ever professional footballer from the Northern Mariana Islands. He made his league debut for the club on 7 February 2026 in a 6–2 victory over Philippine Army.

== International career ==
In 2022, Toves was part of the squads that competed in 2023 AFC U-17 Asian Cup qualification and 2023 AFC U-20 Asian Cup qualification. In preparation for the latter, he scored in a friendly against Guam as part of a training camp in Dededo. He was called up to the national under-23 team in August 2023 for the Marianas Cup against neighboring Guam. Toves scored two goals in his team's second match of the competition. The 2023 edition of the tournament marked the first-ever win for the Northern Mariana Islands since the cup's founding in 2007. Toves was then named the competition's most valuable player. Later in August, he was named the Northern Mariana Sports Association Male Student Athlete of the month.

Toves was called up to the senior national team in November 2023 for the 2023 Pacific Games. He made his senior debut on 18 November against Fiji in the team's opening match. Later in the competition, he appeared in his country's 4–0 win over American Samoa. The victory was the Northern Mariana Islands' first-ever win in the Pacific Games and first over a full member of the Oceania Football Confederation. Toves scored his first senior international goal against Tuvalu on 30 November in his team's final match of the competition.

In February 2024 Toves was nominated as the Northern Mariana Sports Association Male Student Athlete of the Year for 2023 because of his performances in both the Marianas Cup and Pacific Games. In April 2024, he was named to the senior squad again for a pair of 2024 Marianas Cup matches against Guam. In the first match, Toves opened the scoring in the eighth minute of the eventual 2–1 victory.

=== International goals ===
Scores and results list Northern Mariana Islands' goal tally first.

No.	Date	Venue	Opponent	Score	Result	Competition
1.	30 November 2023	SIFF Academy Field, Honiara, Solomon Islands	Tuvalu	1–4	1–4	2023 Pacific Games
2.	6 April 2024	NMI Training Center, Koblerville, Northern Mariana Islands	Guam	1–0	2–2	2024 Marianas Cup
Last updated 9 April 2024

=== International career statistics ===
As of match played 7 April 2024.

Northern Mariana Islands
Year	Apps	Goals
2023	4	1
2024	2	1
Total	6	2

== Personal ==
Toves is the brother of fellow Northern Mariana Islands international Merrick Toves.
