= Dai Podziewski =

Northern Mariana Islands footballer (born 2001)

Personal information
- Full name: Dai Takegami Podziewski
- Date of birth: 31 August 2001 (age 25)
- Place of birth: Tondabayashi, Osaka, Japan
- Height: 6 ft 0 in (1.83 m)
- Position: Defender

Youth career
- 2016–2017: Paire

College career
Years	Team	Apps	(Gls)
2019–2022	Suffolk University	35	(1)

Senior career*
Years	Team	Apps	(Gls)
2017	Paire		
2017	Teen Ayuyu		
2018–2019	MP United		

International career^{‡}
2018	Northern Mariana Islands U17	1	(0)
2019	Northern Mariana Islands U20	3	(0)
2018	Northern Mariana Islands	2	(0)
- * Club domestic league appearances and goals as of 12:57, 22 July 2023 (UTC) ‡ National team caps and goals as of 12:57, 22 July 2023 (UTC)

Dai Takegami Podziewski (born 31 August 2001) is a footballer who plays as a defender. Born in Japan, he played for the Northern Mariana Islands national team.

== Early life ==
Born in Tondabayashi in the Osaka Prefecture of Japan, Podziewski moved to the Northern Mariana Islands as a child. While on the islands, he also played baseball, and co-founded a futsal club in 2017. He was valedictorian of the Marianas High School's class of 2019. He is of Polish and Japanese descent.

== Club career ==
Podziewski was featured for Paire's under-17 side in 2016, and also played futsal for Astig FC at the 2016 Saipan Soccer School Christmas Youth Futsal Tournament. The following year, he began the season with Paire, before moving to Teen Ayuyu. He would later move to MP United, where he went on to serve as vice-captain as MP United won the NMIFA Men’s League Title in 2019.

== Collegiate soccer ==
In May 2019, it was announced that Podziewski, alongside Northern Mariana Islands national team teammate Sunjoon Tenorio, would move to the United States to enroll at Suffolk University in Boston. He made his NCAA Division III debut for the university's soccer team, the Suffolk Rams, on his birthday, 31 August 2019, in a 1–1 draw with the Massachusetts Maritime Academy.

Following eleven appearances in his first season, the 2020 season was cancelled due to the COVID-19 pandemic in Boston. Following the return of organised soccer in the 2021 season, Podziewski scored his first goal for the Rams in a 4–0 win against the Massachusetts Maritime Academy. The following year, he was named as co-captain of the side, along with Trevor Murdock. The same year, he was named to the CSC DIII Academic All-District Team.

== International career ==
Podziewski represented the Northern Mariana Islands' under-17 team at the 2018 edition of the Marianas Cup, as the Northern Mariana Islands lost 5–3 in a penalty shoot-out to Guam. In July 2019, he attended an under-18 training camp in Matsuyama, Ehime, Japan, playing against students from the St. Catherine University. He later featured three times for the Northern Mariana Islands at under-19 level, in qualification for the 2020 AFC U-19 Championship.

Podziewski was called up to the Northern Mariana Islands senior squad in 2018 for the first preliminary round of the 2019 EAFF E-1 Football Championship, Podziewski made his international debut against Guam. Having also featured in the nation's next game against Mongolia, Podziewski said that the experience "really boosted [his] confidence which helped [him] transition to college knowing what's ahead".

== Career statistics ==
=== International ===
As of matches played 10 January 2019.

National team	Year	Apps	Goals
Northern Mariana Islands	2018	2	0
Total		2	0
