= Konomo Suzuki =

Konomo Suzuki 鈴木 木乃実
Personal information
- Full name: Konomo Suzuki
- Date of birth: July 26, 1990 (age 36)
- Place of birth: Hokkaido, Japan

Youth career
- 2000–2003: Iwamizawa Junior FC 1985
- 2003–2006: Club Fields Linda

College career
| Years | Team | Apps | (Gls) |
| 2009–2013 | Daito Bunka University | | |

Managerial career
- 2014–2015: Nishidai Amica
- 2014–2015: Daito Bunka University (women) (assistant coach)
- 2015–2016: Obihiro Kita High School (women) (coach)
- 2016–2018: Obihiro Kita High School (women) (head coach)
- 2018–2019: Sapporo University (women) (coach)
- 2019–2021: AS Elfen Saitama Mari U-15 (head coach)
- 2021–2022: AS Elfen Saitama Mari U-15 (coach)
- 2022–2023: Japan Football Association (Kanto Women's Region Coach)
- 2023–2025: Northern Mariana Islands U17 (head coach & Interim technical director)
- 2023–2025: Northern Mariana Islands U20 (head coach & Interim technical director)
- 2024: Northern Mariana Islands (head coach)

Konomo Suzuki (鈴木 木乃実, Konomo Suzuki; born 26 July 1990) is a Japanese football manager.

On 5 October 2023 Suzuki was dispatched by the Japan Football Association to the Northern Mariana Islands Football Association (NMIFA) as part of the JFA's International Exchange and Social Contribution Project for overseas dispatch of instructors. Her assignment period is from October 2023 to March 2025. She was appointed as the head coach for both the U17 and U20 men's national teams. Her role also includes assisting with local coach development. In April 2024, Suzuki led the Northern Mariana Islands men's team to achieved a 2-2 draw in their first match and a 2-1 win in their second match against Guam. In August 2024, she guided the Northern Mariana Islands U20 team to win the Marianas Cup, defeating Guam.

== Qualifications ==
Suzuki obtained her JFA A-General coaching license in 2022.
