= Richard Steele (footballer) =

Northern Marianas footballer

Personal information
- Full name: Richard Ramon Pico Steele
- Date of birth: 30 March 2004 (age 22)
- Place of birth: Iloilo City, Philippines
- Height: 1.75 m (5 ft 9 in)
- Position: Striker

Team information
- Current team: Park–Gilbert Buccaneers
- Number: 13

Youth career
- 2010–2020: MP United

College career
Years	Team	Apps	(Gls)
2023–	Park–Gilbert Buccaneers	1	(0)

Senior career*
Years	Team	Apps	(Gls)
2021	Teen Ayuyu		
2022–2023	Eleven Tiger		

International career^{‡}
2022–	Northern Mariana Islands U20	2	(0)
2022–	Northern Mariana Islands	1	(0)
- * Club domestic league appearances and goals ‡ National team caps and goals as of 01:09, 17 September 2022 (UTC)

Richard Steele (born March 30, 2004) is a Northern Mariana Islands association footballer who currently plays for the Park–Gilbert Buccaneers and the Northern Mariana Islands national team.

== Career ==
=== Youth ===
As a youth Steele played for MP United for over ten years and won the top scorer award in local leagues multiple times. He was part of the MP United squad that won back-to-back U12 division titles in 2014 and 2015. Through 2016 he also played as a goalkeeper and won the Golden Gloves Award for the U12 division that season. In 2017 he was tied for fourth in scoring in the Northern Mariana Islands Football Association U14 division. That year he also competed with MPU in the Pacific Ocean Cup in Numazu, Japan. In 2019 he won the Golden Boot of the under-15 league with twenty three goals.

Following the 2019 season his family moved to California where he competed with the Pirates of Santa Ynez Valley Union High School. He was named the team's Best Offensive Player after his first season as the team's top scorer with five goals. While in California he also played club soccer for Kickers Soccer Club in Los Olivos. He was also the club's U16 top scorer that season, scoring twelves times.

=== Early club ===
After one year in California Steele returned to the Northern Mariana Islands and resumed playing with MP United and the national team player pool. In 2021 he moved to Teen Ayuyu of the M-League. Following the season he was one of sixteen players named to the league's All-Star team that competed against the Northern Mariana Islands national team in the All-Star Game.

In 2022, Steele joined Eleven Tiger FC. In the club’s first season in the Marianas League, it defeated Tan Holdings 4–2 in the final to win the league title. He scored two goals in the match en route to the upset victory.

=== College ===
In February 2022, as a senior at Mount Carmel School, Steele committed to play college soccer in the United States for the Wolves of Walla Walla University, a member of the NAIA. However, later that year it was announced that Steele instead opted to join the Park–Gilbert Buccaneers beginning with the 2023–2024 season. He was joined in the squad by national teammates Jeremiah Diaz and Dev Bachani.

== International career ==
Steele was a member of the national under-18 player pool. He made his senior international debut on 19 February 2022 in a friendly against Guam. As part of the same trip, he scored for the national under-20 team in a 4–1 victory against the Guam national under-17 team.

Later in 2022, Steele was named to the under-20 squad again for 2023 AFC U-20 Asian Cup qualification held in Jordan.

=== International career statistics ===
As of match played 19 February 2022.

Northern Mariana Islands
Year	Apps	Goals
2022	1	0
Total	1	0
