= Jerald Aquino =

Northern Marianas footballer

Personal information
- Full name: Jerald Araquel Aquino
- Date of birth: 25 October 2004 (age 22)
- Place of birth: Northern Mariana Islands
- Position: Defender

Team information
- Current team: Tuloy
- Number: 18

Youth career
- –2021: Tan Holdings

Senior career*
Years	Team	Apps	(Gls)
2021–2022	Teen Ayuyus		
2022–2023	Tan Holdings		
2023	Eleven Tiger		
2023–	Tuloy		

International career^{‡}
2023–	Northern Mariana Islands	4	(0)
- * Club domestic league appearances and goals ‡ National team caps and goals as of 13:57, 29 October 2024 (UTC)

Jerald Aquino (born 25 October 2004) is a Northern Mariana Islands international footballer who currently plays for Philippines Football League club Tuloy and the Northern Mariana Islands national team.

== Club career ==
As a youth, Aquino played for Tan Holdings in the island's various junior divisions, including the under-18 league in 2019. By 2021, he was competing in the Marianas Soccer League 1 with the NMI U18 national team, known as Teen Ayuyus. That season, he was named as a member of the league All-Star team that would compete against the senior national team in the All-Star match. The following season, he returned to Tan Holdings in the top division as the team went on to become champions of the Fall Season. By 2023, Aquino had moved to Eleven Tiger FC. With the club, he won his second consecutive league championship and qualified for the inaugural Marianas Club Championship. In the match, Eleven Tiger defeated Wings FC of Guam 2–1 to win the first-ever title.

In 2023, Aquino joined Tuloy F.C. of the Philippines Football League. He had previously played against the club in a friendly match as a member of the under-18 national team as the squad trained in the Philippines in 2019 and trained jointly with the club in 2022. He was joined at the club by international teammate Dev Bachani. However, when the 2024 Philippines Football League kicked off in April 2024, neither play was part of the matchday squad.

== International career ==
As a youth, Aquino represented the Northern Mariana Islands in 2023 AFC U-20 Asian Cup qualification. In preparation for the qualifying campaign, the team held a training camp in the Philippines. Aquino was called up to the senior national team for the 2023 Pacific Games. He made his senior debut in the competition on 18 November 2023 in the team's opening match against Fiji.

=== International career statistics ===
As of match played 30 November 2023.

Northern Mariana Islands
Year	Apps	Goals
2023	4	0
Total	4	0
