= Northern Mariana Islands national under-15 football team =

National association football team

Northern Mariana Islands
- Nickname(s): CNMI strikers
- Association: Northern Mariana Islands Football Association
- Confederation: AFC
- Sub-confederation: EAFF (East Asia)
- Home stadium: Oleai Sports Complex
- FIFA code: NMI
First colors	Second colors

Biggest win
- Northern Mariana Islands 2–1 Macau (Taipei, Taiwan; 24 July 2011)

The Northern Mariana Islands national under-15 football team is the under-15 football (soccer) team of the Northern Mariana Islands and is controlled by the Northern Mariana Islands Football Association. The team is not a member of FIFA. They have played in the EAFF U-15 Youth Tournament. Their last EAFF U-15 Youth Tournament came in 2018.

== Former coaches ==
- (Japan) Kiyoshi Sekiguchi

== 2011 Squad ==
Selected for 2011 EAFF U-15 Youth Tournament.

No.	Pos.	Player	Date of birth (age)	Caps	Goals	Club
		Jordan Butcher				(Northern Mariana Islands)
	DF	Enrico del Rosario	21 March 1997 (age 28)			
		Ethan Dickinson				(Northern Mariana Islands)
	DF	Kenneth Domingo	30 September 1996 (age 28)			(Northern Mariana Islands)
		Gregzon Fontanilla				(Northern Mariana Islands)
	MF	Joel Fruit	31 May 1998 (age 26)			(Northern Mariana Islands)
		Mason Fruit				(Northern Mariana Islands)
	MF	Dakota Hall	30 April 1998 (age 27)			(Northern Mariana Islands)
		William Hinson II				(Northern Mariana Islands)
	DF	Kennedy Izuka	27 May 1998 (age 26)			(Northern Mariana Islands)
		Hunter Jewell				
		Andrew Johnson				(Northern Mariana Islands)
		Angelo Jones				(Northern Mariana Islands)
	FW	Jehn Joyner	9 October 1997 (age 27)			(Northern Mariana Islands)
		Jake Lee				(Northern Mariana Islands)
		Sean Perez				(Northern Mariana Islands)
	DF	John Taisacan	9 August 1997 (age 27)			(Northern Mariana Islands)
	MF	Jireh Yobech	8 July 1996 (age 28)			(Northern Mariana Islands)
