= 2021 M-League Division 1 =

M*League Division 1
- Season: 2021

The 2021 M*League Division 1, played between top-level football club in the Northern Mariana Islands, consists of one tournaments: the Spring League.

== Spring League ==
=== Regular season ===
Pos	Team	Pld	W	D	L	GF	GA	GD	Pts
1	Tan Holdings	14	11	1	2	47	19	+28	34
2	U-18 National Team A	14	9	5	0	38	6	+32	32
3	MP United	14	10	2	2	35	12	+23	32
4	Paire	14	7	1	6	36	29	+7	22
5	U-18 National Team B	14	4	3	7	26	27	−1	15
6	Kanoa	14	3	4	7	19	29	−10	13
7	The One	14	2	1	11	16	48	−32	7
8	The Old B Bank	14	1	1	12	6	53	−47	4

Source: RSSSF
