= Taka Borja =

Northern Marianas footballer

Personal information
- Full name: Taka Horimoto Borja
- Date of birth: 20 November 2003 (age 22)
- Place of birth: Garapan, Northern Mariana Islands
- Position: Striker

Team information
- Current team: Teen Ayuyu
- Number: 8

Youth career
- 2014–2020: Tan Holdings

Senior career*
Years	Team	Apps	(Gls)
2021–	Teen Ayuyu		

International career^{‡}
2022–	Northern Mariana Islands U20	2	(0)
2022–	Northern Mariana Islands	2	(1)
- * Club domestic league appearances and goals ‡ National team caps and goals as of 15:34, 12 September 2022 (UTC)

Taka Borja (born 20 November 2003) is a Northern Mariana Islands footballer who currently plays Teen Ayuyu and the Northern Mariana Islands national team.

== Youth career ==
In 2015 Borja competed with Tan Holdings in a youth tournament in Guam. In the tournament he scored in a 2–4 defeat to Guam Shipyard FC. That year he also took an early lead in the under-12 division top scorer race. The following season he scored fifteen goals to secure the Golden Boot award as the top scorer for the under-14 league. As a youth he also played futsal and was the captain of Bedte FC.

By 2021 Borja had joined Teen Ayuyu and was playing with the senior squad in the Marianas Soccer League.

== International career ==
Borja represented the Northern Mariana Islands in 2018 AFC U-16 Championship qualification and 2020 AFC U-19 Championship qualification. In 2018, he was named to the youth national team again for the East Asian Football Federation U15 Tournament in Xianghe, China and the Tuloy XO Cup held in the Philippines. He served as captain of the team during its time in China.

Borja made his senior international debut on 19 February 2022 in a friendly against Guam. Three days later he scored his first senior international goal in the second match of the series.

=== International goals ===
Scores and results list Northern Mariana Islands' goal tally first.

No.	Date	Venue	Opponent	Score	Result	Competition
1.	22 February 2022	Guam National Football Stadium, Hagåtña, Guam	Guam	2–1	2–3	Friendly
Last updated 28 February 2022

=== International career statistics ===
As of match played 22 February 2022.

Northern Mariana Islands
Year	Apps	Goals
2022	2	1
Total	2	1
