= Nolan Ngewakl =

Northern Marianas footballer

Personal information
- Full name: Nolan Manuel Tsuneo Sablan Ngewakl
- Date of birth: 8 July 2008 (age 18)
- Place of birth: Northern Mariana Islands
- Height: 1.80 m (5 ft 11 in)
- Position: Forward

Team information
- Current team: Latte
- Number: 18

Youth career
- 2020–2023: Matansa

Senior career*
| Years | Team | Apps | (Gls) |
| 2023– | Latte | | |

International career^{‡}
| 2023– | Northern Mariana Islands | 4 | (1) |
- * Club domestic league appearances and goals ‡ National team caps and goals as of 19:14, 1 December 2023 (UTC)

Nolan Ngewakl (born 8 July 2008) is a Northern Mariana Islands footballer who currently plays Latte FC of the Marianas Soccer League 1 and the Northern Mariana Islands national team.

== Club career ==
As a youth, Ngewakl played for Matansa FC in the Youth Soccer League. He was one of the top scores in the league in 2020. In 2022, he was one of three national team players in the squad. He returned to the team for the 2023 season. Later in 2023, Ngewakl joined Latte FC in the Marianas Soccer League 1, scoring against Eleven Tiger FC in October.

== International career ==
Ngewakl represented the Northern Mariana Islands at the youth level as part of the national U15 squad. He scored for the side in a 6–0 friendly victory over Guam in July 2022. Later that year, he was part of the squad that competed in 2023 AFC U-17 Asian Cup qualification. He was credited with an own goal in a 0–23 defeat to Australia in the Group Stage of the competition. In 2023, he was named to the under-15 squad again, this time for the 2023 EAFF U-15 Men's Championship held in Qingdao, China. He was named co-captain of the side, along with Mark Costales.

Ngewakl was called up to the senior national team in November 2023 for the 2023 Pacific Games. He made his senior debut on 18 November against Fiji in the team's opening match. Later in the competition, he scored in a 4–0 win over American Samoa for his first senior international goal. Ngewakl, who at age fifteen was the youngest player in the NMI squad, scored almost immediately after entering the match and just before the final whistle. The victory was the Northern Mariana Islands' first-ever win in the Pacific Games and first over a full member of the Oceania Football Confederation.

=== International goals ===
Scores and results list Northern Mariana Islands' goal tally first.

| No. | Date | Venue | Opponent | Score | Result | Competition |
|---|---|---|---|---|---|---|
| 1. | 27 November 2023 | SIFF Academy Field, Honiara, Solomon Islands | American Samoa | 4–0 | 4–0 | 2023 Pacific Games |
Last updated 27 November 2023

=== International career statistics ===
As of match played 30 November 2023.

Northern Mariana Islands
| Year | Apps | Goals |
|---|---|---|
| 2022 | 4 | 1 |
| Total | 4 | 1 |
