= Johann Noetzel =

Northern Mariana Islands football player and manager

Personal information
- Full name: Johann Thomas Noetzel
- Date of birth: 4 April 1977 (age 49)
- Place of birth: Seattle, Washington, U.S.
- Height: 1.83 m (6 ft 0 in)
- Position: Goalkeeper

Youth career
- Aston Villa

Senior career*
Years	Team	Apps	(Gls)
1999–2006	Dallas Burn	1	(0)
2006–2015	Tan Holdings		
2015–2016	Stallion F.C.		
2017	Tan Holdings		
2018–2020	IDL FC		

International career
2012–	Northern Mariana Islands	12	(0)

Managerial career
- 2011: Cal State San Marcos Cougars (goalkeeping)
- 2012: Northern Mariana Islands
- 2014–2015: Guam (goalkeeping)
- 2015–2016: Stallion F.C. (goalkeeping)
- 2018–2020: Guam (goalkeeping)
- 2020–2022: Visakha (assistant)
- 2021: Visakha (caretaker)
- 2023–: Samut Prakan City (assistant)
- * Club domestic league appearances and goals

Johann Thomas Noetzel (born 4 April 1977) is a Northern Mariana Islands professional football player and manager.

== Playing career ==
He played one game for the Dallas Burn.

In 2012, he made his debut for the Northern Mariana Islands national football team.

== Coaching career ==
Noetzel joined the Cal State San Marcos Cougars men's soccer coaching staff as a volunteer goalkeeping coach in October 2011.

In 2012, he coached the Northern Mariana Islands national football team.
