= Lucas Knecht =

Footballer (born 1993)

Personal information
- Full name: Lucas Paul Knecht
- Date of birth: 30 March 1993 (age 33)
- Place of birth: Fort Wayne, Indiana, United States
- Height: 1.83 m (6 ft 0 in)
- Position: Defender

Youth career
- –2009: MP United
- 2010–2011: Mount Albert

College career
Years	Team	Apps	(Gls)
2012–2014	GSW Hurricanes	8	(0)

Senior career*
Years	Team	Apps	(Gls)
2007–2009	MP United		

International career^{‡}
2006	Northern Mariana Islands U14		
2007–2014	Northern Mariana Islands	11	(0)
- * Club domestic league appearances and goals ‡ National team caps and goals as of 12:57, 10 January 2019 (UTC)

Lucas Paul Knecht (born 30 March 1993) is a footballer who holds the record as the youngest ever player in a men's international match. He made his debut for the Northern Mariana Islands national team aged 14 years and 2 days.

== Early life ==
Knecht played youth soccer with MP United.

== College career ==
Having already made his international debut, Knecht went on to study at the Mount Albert Grammar School in New Zealand, before moving to America to study at the Georgia Southwestern State University, playing for the Hurricanes soccer team. He made eight appearances during his time there, without scoring.

== Club career ==
After leaving the Georgia Southwestern State University, it is unclear as to whether Knecht joined a club side, with some reports claiming he played for 3. Liga outfit VfL Osnabrück.

== International career ==
He started playing youth international football with the Northern Mariana Islands when he was 13, being selected for a U14 tournament in Beijing, China.

He played in Northern Mariana Islands men's first international soccer victory.

Knecht holds the record for being the youngest ever male international footballer, when he made his Northern Mariana Islands debut aged just 14 years and 2 days against Guam in a 9–0 defeat on 1 April 2007. Since then, he has made 11 appearances for the Blue Ayuyu. He played in all three games as his nation failed to qualify for the 2014 AFC Challenge Cup.

== Career statistics ==
=== International ===
As of matches played 6 January 2019.

National team	Year	Apps	Goals
Northern Mariana Islands	2007	1	0
Northern Mariana Islands	2008	0	0
Northern Mariana Islands	2009	3	0
Northern Mariana Islands	2010	0	0
Northern Mariana Islands	2011	0	0
Northern Mariana Islands	2012	2	0
Northern Mariana Islands	2013	3	0
Northern Mariana Islands	2014	2	0
Total		11	0
