= Wang Zhe =

Wang Zhe may refer to:

- Wang Chongyang (1113–1170), Chinese philosopher and poet
- Wang Zhe (referee) (born 1975), Chinese football referee
- Joe Wang Miller (born 1989), Chinese-Northern Mariana Islander footballer
