= Joe Wang Miller =

Northern Mariana Islander footballer

Personal information
- Date of birth: 3 February 1989 (age 37)
- Place of birth: Tianjin, China
- Position: Forward

Team information
- Current team: Matansa

Youth career
- Tianjin Teda F.C.

Senior career*
Years	Team	Apps	(Gls)
2008–2009	IFC Wild Bills		
2009–2011	MP United	26	(38)
2011–2013	Guam Shipyard		
2013	Tan Holdings		
2014-2017	MP United	8	(11)
2018-2020	Paire	11	(20)
2024	Matansa	15	(10)

International career^{‡}
2009–2016	Northern Mariana Islands	15	(4)
- * Club domestic league appearances and goals as of 13 April 2025 ‡ National team caps and goals as of 13 April 2025

Joe Wang Miller (Chinese: 王喆; born 3 February 1989) is a footballer who plays as a forward for Matansa. Born in China, he represents the Northern Mariana Islands national team.

== Club career ==
=== MP United ===
Miller was part of MP United's 2009 and 2010 squads. Saipan-based MP finished 2nd in the league in 2009, with Miller winning the top goalscorer award after scoring 23 goals in the season. The following season MP went one better and won the championship, remaining unbeaten in the process. Joe was the league's top scorer again, with 15 goals. Miller has an incredible record at club level, having averaged 1.46 goals per game over the two seasons he has played for MP United. Miller also scored a hat-trick in a 2nd round 2010 KASA Cup match against Wild Bill's Independents, which MP United won 5-0. He then scored the only goal as MP squeezed past Inter Godfather's in the next round.

At MP United, Miller plays alongside Northern Mariana Islands national football team team-mates Nicolas B. Swaim, a midfielder, defender Adam Hardwicke, midfielder Yuki Adachi and fellow striker Kirk Schuler.

== International career ==
Miller has scored 3 goals in four appearances for the Northern Mariana Islands national football team, making him the current squad's top scorer. Joe was called up to the country's squad for the East Asian Football Championship 2010 and scored one of Northern Mariana's three goals in the tournament. His goal came in Northern Mariana's opening game, a 6–1 loss to Macau on 11 March 2009. Miller's strike, in the fifth minute, put CNMI 1–0 up but Macau came back to score 6 goals without reply.

Joe had grabbed his first international goal in a 3–2 loss to Guam in the Marianas Cup on 29 April 2008. Miller's goal in the 24th minute equalized for Northern Mariana Islands, but Guam went on to win the match in extra time.

=== International goals ===
Scores and results list Northern Mariana Islands' goal tally first, score column indicates score after each Miller goal.

List of international goals scored by Joe Wang Miller
No.	Date	Venue	Opponent	Score	Result	Competition
1	27 April 2008	Oleai Sports Complex, Saipan, Northern Mariana Islands	Guam	1–2	2–3	2008 Marianas Cup
2	11 March 2009	Leo Palace Resort, Yona, Guam	Macau	1–0	1–6	2010 East Asian Football Championship
3	19 June 2010	Oleai Sports Complex, Saipan, Northern Mariana Islands	Guam	1–0	1–1	2010 Marianas Cup
4	18 July 2012	Leo Palace Resort, Yona, Guam	Guam	1–0	1–3	2013 EAFF East Asian Cup

== Honors ==
MP United

- Northern Mariana Championship: 2010

Individual

- Northern Mariana Championship top goalscorer: 2009, 2010

== See also ==
- List of top international men's football goalscorers by country
