= Chikashi =

- Gender: Male

Origin
- Origin: Japanese
- Meaning: Different meanings depending on the kanji used

Chikashi (written: 近, 隣, 親, 千樫 or 誓志) is a masculine Japanese given name. Notable people with the name include:

- Chikashi Akazawa (赤沢 親; born 1934), Japanese ice hockey player
- Chikashi Koizumi (古泉 千樫; 1886–1927), Japanese poet
- Chikashi Masuda (増田 誓志; born 1985), Japanese footballer
- Chikashi Suzuki (鈴木 隣), Japanese football manager
- Chikashi Toyoshima (豊島 近; born 1954), Japanese biophysicist
