= Enrico del Rosario =

Northern Mariana Islander footballer (born 1997)

Personal information
- Full name: Enrico Domenic Tolentino del Rosario
- Date of birth: 21 March 1997 (age 29)
- Place of birth: Saipan, Northern Mariana Islands
- Height: 1.74 m (5 ft 9 in)
- Position: Defender

Team information
- Current team: Northern Kentucky Nitro
- Number: 4

Youth career
- 2009–2011: MP United

College career
| Years | Team | Apps | (Gls) |
| 2015 | Alderson Broaddus Battlers | | |
| 2017–2019 | Northern Kentucky | | |

Senior career*
| Years | Team | Apps | (Gls) |
| 2011–2014 | MP United | | |
| 2014 | Agila MSA | | |
| 2015–2016 | Stallion Laguna | | |
| 2018 | MP United | | |
| 2020 | Kings Hammer | | |
| 2021– | Northern Kentucky Nitro | 16 | |

International career^{‡}
| 2010–2011 | Northern Mariana Islands U15 | | |
| 2013 | Northern Mariana Islands U18 | 5 | (0) |
| 2012–2018 | Northern Mariana Islands | 6 | (0) |
- * Club domestic league appearances and goals ‡ National team caps and goals as of 12:57, 6 January 2019 (UTC)

Enrico Domenic Tolentino del Rosario (born 21 March 1997) is a Northern Mariana Islander professional footballer who plays for the Northern Mariana Islands national team.

== Career statistics ==
=== International ===
As of matches played 6 January 2019

| National team | Year | Apps | Goals |
|---|---|---|---|
| Northern Mariana Islands | 2012 | 1 | 0 |
| Northern Mariana Islands | 2013 | 0 | 0 |
| Northern Mariana Islands | 2014 | 0 | 0 |
| Northern Mariana Islands | 2015 | 0 | 0 |
| Northern Mariana Islands | 2016 | 2 | 0 |
| Northern Mariana Islands | 2017 | 0 | 0 |
| Northern Mariana Islands | 2018 | 3 | 0 |
| Total | | 6 | 0 |
