= Football in the Northern Mariana Islands =

The sport of association football in the country of the Northern Mariana Islands is run by the Northern Mariana Islands Football Association. The association administers the men's national football team, the women's national football team, youth national teams of both genders, as well as the Men's Championship and Women's Championship.

== History ==
Evidence of early football on the islands is scattered, but there is evidence that a representative team withdrew from the 1983 South Pacific Games. To date they have never competed in the Football at the Pacific Games in either gender. These early days were under the Northern Mariana Islands Soccer Federation or NMISF, with their first, confirmed international action coming in 1998, at the 1998 Micronesian Games. At an unknown point, though by 2003, they were admitted as an associate member of the Oceania Football Confederation. However, by this point, NMISF were beginning to fall apart, with football on the islands reducing to a few hundred or so players in a less organized structure. Seeking to revitalize the sport, the Northern Mariana Islands Football Association was set up in August 2005, to replace the old NMISF and return to developing the sport. The Northern Mariana Championship and Northern Mariana Women's Championship would first run the next year, in 2006, with both persisting to this day.

International football took a little longer, with the FA seeking alternative competition as they had not been to any OFC competition to that date. December 2006 saw their admission as a provisional member of the East Asian Football Federation, with their first matches coming against Guam as part of the 2008 East Asian Football Championship Preliminary Round. Full EAFF membership would follow in September 2008, paving the way for them to apply to the Asian Football Confederation, where they were admitted as an associate member in July 2009, following their requested release from the Oceania Football Confederation in June 2009. August 2009 would see the women's national football team debut in EAFF competition, with national sides competing at every age level from U14 to seniors for men and women in AFC and EAFF competition across 2010–20. Locally, the league system would stabilize, with the men's league moving to spring and autumn annual leagues from 2015 onwards, though the women's league would remain annual.

== League system ==
Level	Men's League(s)/Division(s)
1	Marianas Soccer League; 6 clubs + NMI national under-18 football team
2	Marianas Soccer League 2; 6 clubs + NMI women's national football team

Level	Women's League(s)/Division(s)
1	Women's Division 1; 8 clubs
