= Dominic Gadia =

Guamanian soccer player

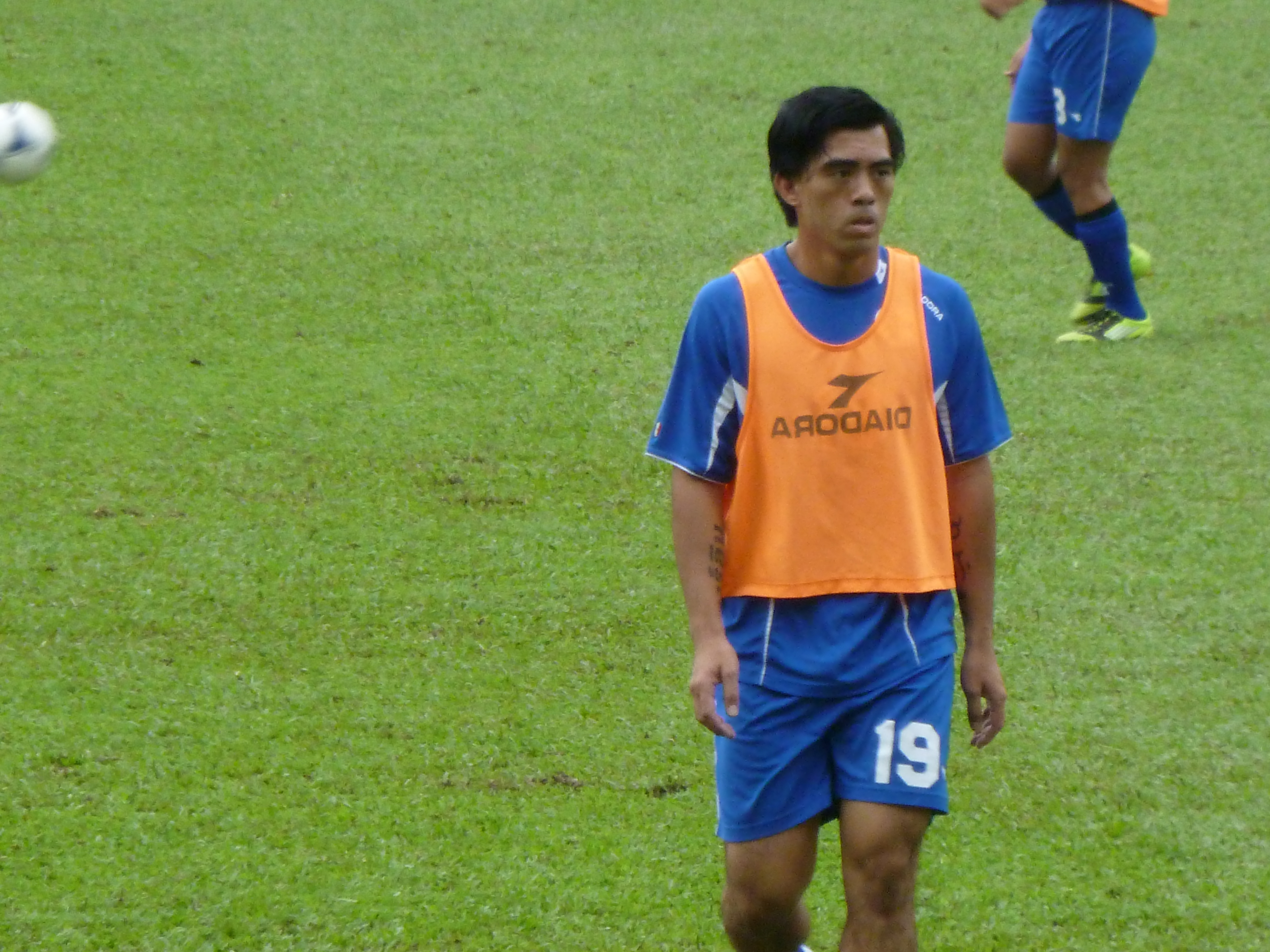

Personal information
- Full name: Dominic Tacadina Gadia
- Date of birth: January 18, 1986 (age 40)
- Place of birth: Hagåtña, Guam
- Height: 1.73 m (5 ft 8 in)
- Position: Defender

Senior career*
Years	Team	Apps	(Gls)
2004–2010	Quality Distributors		
2010–2012	Cars Plus		
2012–2013	Table 35 Espada		

International career
2003–	Guam	29	(0)

Managerial career
- 2020–2022: Guam (chief instructor)
- 2023–: Guam U23
- 2024–: Guam U20
- * Club domestic league appearances and goals

Dominic Tacadina Gadia (born January 18, 1986) is a Guamanian association soccer coach and former player, who is the head coach of Guam U23 and Guam U20.
