= Guam national under-23 football team =

National sports team

Guam Under-23
- Nickname: Matao (The Noblemen)
- Association: Guam Football Association
- Confederation: AFC (Asia)
- Sub-confederation: EAFF (East Asian)
- Head coach: Dominic Gadia
First colors	Second colors

First international
- Guam 6–2 Northern Mariana Islands (Dededo, Guam; 20 July 2019)

Biggest win
- Guam 6–2 Northern Mariana Islands (Dededo, Guam; 20 July 2019)

Biggest defeat
- United Arab Emirates 13–0 Guam (Abu Dhabi, United Arab Emirates; 3 September 2025)

The Guam national under-23 and Olympic football team represents Guam, an overseas territory of the United States at the international under-22 and under-23 football competitions. It is controlled by the Guam Football Association and is affiliated with the Asian Football Confederation's East Asian Football Federation region.

The team's current head coach is former Guamanian international Dominic Gadia.

== History ==
In 2019, the Guam national under-23 was established to compete in the 2019 edition of Marianas Cup after it was regulated to be an event for under-23 players. The team was coached by national team coach Karl Dodd and was consisted with mainly players selected from the U19 category alongside five U23 players. The team led by Dodd managed to help Guam winning their seventh title of Marianas Cup after a 6–2 victory against Northern Mariana Islands national under-23 side.

In 2023, the Guam FA decided to officially emerged an under-23 national team to improve the competitiveness of the players to serve the Guam national team. Therefore, the Guam under-23 team made their first appearance in the AFC U-23 Asian Cup qualifiers during the 2024 edition. On 9 September 2023, Guam won their first point in an official under-23 competition following the 1–1 tie against the Singapore under-23s, with their only goal scored by Riku Meyar.

== Current coaching staff ==
Position	Name
Head coach	(Guam) Dominic Gadia
Assistant coach	(Guam) Jefferson Piliping
Assistant coach	(Guam) Augustine Salvatierra
Goalkeeper coach	(Guam) Ted Escudero
Video Analyst	(Guam) Jefferson Piliping
Team Doctor	(Guam) Dr. Luis Cruz
Physiotherapist	(Guam) Simeon Piñón
Physiotherapist	(Guam) Gilbert Robles
Team Manager	(Guam) Vance Manibusan
High Performance Manager	(Guam) Irving Buhay
Media Officer	(Guam) Jill Espiritu
Equipment Director	(Guam) Thomas Castro

== Managers ==
As of 9 September 2025

Name	Nationality	Period	Pld	W	D	L	GF	GA	Competitions
Karl Dodd	(Australia)	2019	1	1	0	0	6	2	2019 Marianas Cup
Dominic Gadia	(Guam)	2023-2024	5	1	1	3	3	15	2023 Marianas Cup; 2024 AFC U-23 Asian Cup qualification
Ross Awa	(Guam) (Philippines)	2025-	3	0	0	3	0	20	2026 AFC U-23 Asian Cup qualification

== Competitive history ==
=== AFC U-23 Championship ===
AFC U-22/U-23 Championship Record
Hosts / Year	Result	Position	GP	W	D	L	GS	GA
(Oman) 2013	Did not enter							
(Qatar) 2016	Did not enter							
(China) 2018	Did not enter							
(Thailand) 2020	Did not enter							
(Uzbekistan) 2022	Did not enter							
(Qatar) 2024	did not qualify	Qualifiers	3	0	1	2	2	12
(Saudi Arabia) 2026	did not qualify	Qualifiers	0	0	0	0	0	0
(Japan) 2028	to be determined	to be determined						
Total	0/6	Qualifiers	3	0	1	2	2	12

=== Olympic Games ===
Summer Olympic Games Record
Year	Result	Position	Pld	W	D	L	GF	GA
(Spain) 1992	Did not enter							
(United States) 1996	Did not enter							
(Australia) 2000	Did not enter							
(Greece) 2004	Did not enter							
(China) 2008	Did not enter							
(United Kingdom) 2012	Did not enter							
(Brazil) 2016	Did not enter							
(Japan) 2020	Did not enter							
(France) 2024	Did not qualify							
(United States) 2028	To be determined							
Total	0/9	Qualifiers	0	0	0	0	0	0

== Honours ==
=== Friendly ===
- Marianas Cup (1): 2019

== See also ==
- Guam national football team
- Guam national under-20 football team
- Guam national under-17 football team
