= Sunjoon Tenorio =

Northern Mariana Islander footballer (born 2001)

Personal information
- Full name: Sunjoon Perry Kim Tenorio
- Date of birth: May 20, 2001 (age 25)
- Place of birth: Saipan, Northern Mariana Islands
- Height: 6 ft 2 in (1.88 m)
- Position: Forward

Team information
- Current team: Matansa

Youth career
- 2011–2019: MP United

College career
Years	Team	Apps	(Gls)
2019–2020	Suffolk Rams	15	(10)
2021–2022	Warner Pacific Knights	32	(4)

Senior career*
Years	Team	Apps	(Gls)
2017–2019	Teen Ayuyu		
2018–2022	MP United		(18)
2022	Eleven Tiger		
2024	Matansa	8	(9)

International career
2015–2017	Northern Mariana Islands U17	5	(3)
2019	Northern Mariana Islands U20	5	(3)
2018–	Northern Mariana Islands	3	(1)
- * Club domestic league appearances and goals

Sunjoon Tenorio (born May 20, 2001) is a Northern Mariana Islander international footballer who plays for Eleven Tiger and the Northern Mariana Islands national team.

== College career ==
Tenorio began playing college soccer in the United States for Suffolk University in 2019. In his first season, he scored ten goals in fifteen appearances. He was the team's highest scorer in addition to being named MVP and receiving several rookie honors. The following season he transferred to Warner Pacific University and began playing for the Knights.

== Club career ==
As a youth, Tenorio had played for the academy of MP United since at least 2011. That year the club had an undefeated season en route to winning the U12 division title. For the 2015 under-15 youth season, he scored the late game-winning goal off of a header for a 1–0 victory over Tan Holdings. MP United finished the season without a single loss thanks to the victory. Two years later, Tenorio scored a hat-trick as MP United once again defeated Tan Holdings in the final to win the U17 championship.

By 2017 Tenorio had joined Teen Ayuyu of the M-League Division 1. The club established itself as the top scoring team in the league early in the season and were the eventual runners-up. Tenorio continued to compete with MP United in the U17 Youth Division and was named NMSA/TSL Foundation Student Athlete of the Month for November. He also won the Golden Boot award for the youth division after scoring 19 goals throughout the season as MP United won the division crown in both the league and the FA Challenge Cup.

In 2018 the player competed in the U18 division for MP United. He returned to the club's senior team in the first division in 2020 and 2021 during his college offseason.

== International career ==
Tenorio represented the Northern Marianas Islands in qualification for the 2016 AFC U-16 Championship. He scored a goal in NMI's final match, a 2–9 loss to the Philippines. He returned to the team in 2018 for the annual Marianas Cup. His two goals helped NMI take a late 4–3 lead over Guam. However, the team ultimately fell in the penalty shootout. The following year, he once again scored for NMI in the Marianas Cup but the team lost 2–6. Later that year he was part of the national side for 2020 AFC U-19 Championship qualification. He scored two goals in the team's opening match against Brunei.

Tenorio went on to make his senior international debut on September 2, 2018 in a 2019 EAFF E-1 Football Championship match against Guam. Four days later he scored his first senior international goal, the game-tying strike in a 1–1 draw with Macau.

== Career statistics ==
As of matches played September 6, 2018.

National team	Year	Apps	Goals
Northern Mariana Islands	2018	3	1
Total		3	1

Scores and results list the Northern Mariana Islands' goal tally first.

No	Date	Venue	Opponent	Score	Result	Competition
1.	September 6, 2018	MFF Football Centre, Ulaanbaatar, Mongolia	Macau	1–1	1–1	2019 EAFF E-1 Football Championship
