= Northern Mariana Islands national football team =

Men's association football team

Northern Mariana Islands
- Nickname: Blue Ayuyu
- Association: Northern Mariana Islands Football Association (NMIFA)
- Confederation: AFC (Asia)
- Sub-confederation: EAFF (East Asia)
- Captain: Clifford Barrozo
- Most caps: Nicolas Swaim (17)
- Top scorer: Joe Wang Miller (4)
- Home stadium: Oleai Sports Complex
- FIFA code: MNP
First colors	Second colors

FIFA ranking
- Current: NR (7 October 2026)

First international
- Unofficial; Northern Mariana Islands 8–0 Yap (Koror, Palau; 28 July 1998); Official; Northern Mariana Islands 2–3 Guam (Saipan, Northern Mariana Islands; 25 March 2007)

Biggest win
- Unofficial; Palau 1–12 Northern Mariana Islands (Koror, Palau; 31 July 1998); Official; Northern Mariana Islands 4–0 American Samoa (Honiara, Solomon Islands; 27 November 2023)

Biggest defeat
- Fiji 10–0 Northern Mariana Islands (Honiara, Solomon Islands; 18 November 2023)

Pacific Games
- Appearances: 1 (first in 2023)
- Best result: 10th place (2023)

Micronesian Games
- Appearances: 1 (first in 1998)
- Best result: Champions (1998)

The Northern Mariana Islands national football team represents the Commonwealth of the Northern Mariana Islands in international men's football. The team is controlled by the governing body for football in the Northern Mariana Islands, the Northern Mariana Islands Football Association, which is a member of the East Asian Football Federation (EAFF) and since December 2020 a full member of the Asian Football Confederation (AFC). The association is not a member of the world governing body FIFA, although it had applied for membership, and so while the national team is eligible to enter AFC and EAFF-run competitions, they are currently ineligible for global competitions such as the FIFA World Cup. As such, they do not have an official FIFA ranking. However, the team has been consistently ranked among the lowest in the world on the Elo ratings, reaching the very lowest position among men's senior international teams in the world in July 2016, according to a ratings system that also includes a number of other non-FIFA teams.

Following the completion of the preliminary qualifying round for the 2017 EAFF East Asian Cup the team have won only one official competitive match against international opposition and have a goal difference of −78 in official matches. The team have never qualified for the finals of a major tournament and beyond friendlies and qualifying matches, their only official competition has been in an exhibition tournament in the regional Micronesian Games in 1998, which they won, to date their only tournament success.

They are one of the youngest international teams, having played their first match in an exhibition tournament associated with the 1998 Micronesian Games. Following this appearance, they played only one more match, against the Federated States of Micronesia before the original governing body for football in the country, the Northern Mariana Islands Soccer Federation, became defunct and the team withdrew from international competition. During the time of the Northern Mariana Islands Football Association, eligibility criteria for the national team were quite lax, a minimum residency requirement of two years meant that the national team often included a number of contractors working on Saipan who were not of Northern Marianan heritage. Following the foundation of a new governing body, the Northern Mariana Islands Football Association, the national team was reestablished and, having resigned their associate membership of the Oceania Football Confederation (OFC), they joined the EAFF in 2006, becoming full members in 2008.

Since that date, their international appearances have mainly been restricted to qualifying competitions for the EAFF East Asian Cup, although they also attempted to qualify for the AFC Challenge Cup once, having been admitted as associate members in 2009, and have played several friendly matches against neighboring nation Guam, in which the two countries compete for the perpetual trophy, the Marianas Cup.

== History ==
=== 1998 Micronesian Games ===
The Northern Mariana Islands made their international debut in an exhibition football tournament associated with the 1998 Micronesia Games. The original governing body for football in the Northern Mariana Islands, the Northern Mariana Islands Soccer Federation had been accepted as an associate member of the Oceania Football Confederation, but this was the first time records indicated they had participated in any international tournament.

The tournament was officially called the W.C.T.C. Shell Soccer Exhibition and was a demonstration event only at the games, not having medal status. Furthermore, the tournament did not meet established regulations; the matches played were only 9-a-side, the games lasted only 80 minutes and the pitch was smaller than regulation size.

Nonetheless, the Northern Mariana Islands team performed well in the group stage playing against Guam, Palau, Yap (then considered essentially the Federated States of Micronesia national football team), a team representing the Micronesian state of Pohnpei and a "Palau B" team consisting of Bangladeshis living on Palau. The team won their first two matches 8–0 against Palau B and Yap respectively. A 2–1 loss to Guam in their third game was quickly forgotten as they went on to record resounding victories in their final two group games defeating Palau 12–1 and Pohnpei 11–2 to finish second in the group with a +35 goal difference after their five games, qualifying for the final match.

The team avenged their earlier group stage defeat to Guam in the final, beating them 3–0 to claim the tournament title. Charles Kewo and Christopher Guerrero scored in the opening quarter of an hour to give the Northern Mariana Islands a 2–0 half time lead, a lead they extended in the second half through an unknown goalscorer (although other sources suggest Guerrero was the scorer) to seal their victory.

=== 1999 Micronesian Cup ===
The following year, the team travelled to Yap to compete the first Micronesian Soccer Cup. This was a three team tournament consisting of the Northern Mariana Islands, the Federated States of Micronesia and an international team known as Crushers (or Crusaders according to other sources). Their performance here was less successful than at the Micronesian Games the previous year. In their first game, they lost 7–0 to the Federated States of Micronesia. It is not recorded whether they played their other group match against Crushers / Crusaders, but given that the final was contested between the Federated States of Micronesia and Crushers / Crusaders, it can be extrapolated that if the match did take place, the best result the Northern Mariana Islands could have achieved was a draw.

==== Hiatus ====
The country then entered something of a hiatus in footballing terms. The original governing body for football in the country, the Northern Mariana Islands Soccer Federation became defunct sometime between 2002 and 2003 and after that, no international competition took place until the current governing body, the Northern Mariana Islands Football Association (NMIFA) was founded in 2005. Around this time, reports indicate that there was no official men's football of any kind in the country. In 2006, discussions were held with the NMIFA concerning the establishment of an official men's league. At the time it was hoped that the establishment of an official men's competition would provide the means by which players who could meet the citizenship and eligibility criteria to represent the country at future tournaments might become involved. Under the auspices of the Northern Mariana Islands Soccer Federation, teams entered into tournaments such as the 1998 Micronesian Games included a number of foreign players working on Saipan as contractors. This was not uncommon in the area at this time and some other teams also included players of similar status. For the Northern Mariana Islands specifically, the only eligibility requirements players needed to fulfill was a two-year residency.

==== Return ====
In December 2006, the East Asian Football Federation admitted the Northern Mariana Islands as a provisional member. This membership entitled them to a $120,000 annual grant from the EAFF to further football development in the country. The EAFF then granted full membership in September 2008.

=== Marianas Cup (2007–2008) ===
Following their acceptance as an associate member of the EAFF, their first participation in EAFF competition was in the 2008 East Asian Football Championship Preliminary Round, a two legged tie against Guam. The first leg, played in Saipan, resulted in a 3–2 loss for the Northern Mariana Islands Mark McDonald twice equalized after Guam had taken the lead only for Zachary Pangelinan to score the winning goal in the 72nd minute. Nonetheless, the performance of the home team was positively received and was still remarked upon a year later. Unfortunately the return leg in Hagatna a week later produced a much more one-sided result as Guam were victorious 9–0, Pangelinan scoring five times and four other players scoring once to ensure that Guam not only progressed to the next round of the EAFF competition but also that they were the winners of the inaugural Marianas Cup, a perpetual trophy contested each time the two nations play each other.

The two teams met again the following year in Saipan and for the third time in a row, Guam were the victors. Guam took the lead halfway through the first half through David Manibusan, but Joe Wang Miller equalized four minutes later and the teams went into half time tied at 1–1. Guam again took the lead in the 52nd minute through and own goal but the Northern Mariana Islands equalized with ten minutes left in normal time through Steven McKagen. With the teams tied at the end of 90 minutes, two periods of extra time of seven and a half minutes were played and in the 95th minute, Matthew Cruz scored the deciding goal with Guam running out victors 3–2 and retaining the Marianas Cup. Although there was disappointment in not winning, national newspapers commented that the performance was an improvement over the "shocking" 9–0 defeat in their previous encounter.

=== AFC membership (2009–present) ===
Prior to their AFC membership being accepted, the team made the short trip to Yona, Guam to compete in the preliminary round of the 2010 East Asian Football Championship. This time, instead of the two-legged playoffs against Guam contested in the previous edition, the Northern Mariana Islands took part in a four team group, the winner of which would advance to the next round. The team was drawn against hosts Guam, Mongolia and Macau. The team prepared for the tournament for several months prior to departing for Guam, although in that time, they were only able to train with new coach Sugao Kambe for a month. It was acknowledged by their coach prior to their departure that they would be the least experienced of the four teams competing at this stage and this was to prove true as they lost all three of their games: 6–1 to Macau, 2–1 to Guam (a third successive Marianas Cup victory for Guam) and 4–1 to Mongolia. The team returned home without a positive result, although it was noted in the national press that they had been able to score in each of their three games.

In July 2009, the AFC Executive Committee agreed to accept the Northern Mariana Islands Football Association (NMIFA) as an associate member of the Asian Football Confederation, after the association received permission for release from the Oceania Football Confederation in June 2009, paving the way to join AFC. It was the NMIFA which resigned from the OFC, despite it being the earlier governing body, the Northern Mariana Islands Soccer Federation which had become a member in the first place.

==== First draw ====
On 19 June 2010, Northern Mariana Islands earned a 1–1 draw with neighbor Guam in the 2010 Marianas Cup. The match ended in a draw as there was insufficient lighting to continue the match after the end of regulation. Joe Wang Miller scored for the NMI in the 68th minute and Jason Cunliffe answered in the 89th minute to salvage a draw for Guam.

Despite the efforts of the NMIFA, delays in decision making around whether the 2011 Pacific Games football tournament would double as a FIFA World Cup qualifying event meant that the national team were unable to enter. As a result, no games were played for the next two years until July 2012 when The Blue Ayuyus entered the 2013 EAFF East Asian Cup First Preliminary Round, hosted again by Guam. New coach Chikashi Suzuki was conscious of the need to snap the losing run of matches against Guam, had recognized that previous squads had contained a large number of veteran players and called up a number of younger players such as Lucas Knecht and Bo Barry who were playing college and high school football respectively in the United States. However, the team still included a wide age range of players, Enrico del Rosario and Brian Lee were the youngest at 15 with Dan Westphal the oldest at 42.

Optimism that the team might finally be able to beat Guam appeared well placed when Joe Wang Miller opened the scoring for the Northern Mariana Islands, but two fouls from William Dunn allowed Guam to score through a penalty and a free kick before a handball from Kirk Schuler gifted Guam their third goal confirming a fourth defeat out of five games against Guam. Despite the result, the team expressed confidence that they would be able to beat Macau, the other team in the three team qualification group, who still had to play Guam, and potentially secure the single qualifying berth for the next round. However, this confidence was to be misplaced. Macau took a 2–0 lead at half time, despite resolute defending from the Blue Ayuyus in the first twenty minutes, and although Kirk Schuler was able to halve the deficit in the 51st minute, Macau scored three more goals, including a penalty to eliminate the Northern Mariana Islands at the first hurdle for the third consecutive time.

In 2013, the team played their first ever series of matches against opposition from outside the EAFF, taking part in the qualifying rounds for the 2014 AFC Challenge Cup. With the football federation founded only a year prior to the inaugural edition of the AFC Challenge Cup, the team not only had to acclimatize to the elevated environment in which they would be playing, they would also have to face some very strong teams in the shape of Palestine, Bangladesh and Nepal

In their opening game against Nepal, they were dominated from the start, with Bharat Khawas opening the scoring in the fourth minute and completing his hat trick in the 72nd, with three other Nepalese players completing a 6–0 rout. In their second match they fared even worse, losing 9–0 to Palestine, the middle-eastern team scoring four times in the first half and five in the second. Despite already being eliminated following their initial two defeats, the Blue Ayuyus defense performed well in their final game, despite losing 4–0 to Bangladesh, the team managed to keep the scoreline respectable with the result flattering Bangladesh as they scored two very late goals.

==== First victory ====
2014 saw a return to EAFF Cup qualifying for the fourth time, drawn again in a qualifying group containing the weakest four nations in terms of ranking: Guam, Mongolia and Macau. Following an initial 4–0 loss to Mongolia, on 23 July 2014, the Northern Mariana Islands recorded their first ever international win in a match against Macau. Nicolas Swaim and Kirk Schuler scored to beat Macau, 2–1. Following the historic victory, the Northern Mariana Islands Football Association held a celebratory dinner in honour of the team's victory. Younger players commented to national media about how proud they were to be a part of the victory, while older players reflected on how their first matches consisted of a team of veteran players trying to achieve a respectable result and that the victory was the result of years of hard work behind the scenes. Unfortunately, the team was not able to carry this momentum into their final game and again lost to Guam, this time 5–0. They were again eliminated at the first hurdle.

No further international matches were played until the 2017 EAFF East Asian Cup qualifying competition. During the send off to the competition, Ralph Torres, the Governor of the Northern Mariana Islands committed to the team that the government would provide a new pitch in Koblerville, the ground breaking for which it took place in October 2016. The team was not able to repeat the comparative successes of the previous qualifying campaign however, losing all three games and being eliminated at the first stage again. the team lost their first match against Chinese Taipei 8–1, a result made all the more easy for their opponents once striker Joe Wang Miller was sent off for a second yellow card in added time at the end of the first half. A second loss followed against Macau, 3–1 before the campaign was rounded out with a third loss, 8–0, to Mongolia. The team were not aided in their qualifying campaign by a pre-tournament training camp in the Philippines which saw a large number of the squad taken ill. The team played three friendly matches against club sides. Prior to their second match, five of the squad were in hospital and a further five or six were recovering from a bacterial infection that had struck the squad. Nonetheless, they fulfilled all three matches. The results of the first two were not released, but the final match was a 5–1 loss to Kaya.

=== Bid for FIFA membership (2020–present) ===
On 9 December 2020 during the 30th AFC Congress, the Northern Mariana Islands Football Association (NMIFA) became the 47th full AFC member association. FIFA Head of Member Association (MA) Governance, Rolf Tanner, announced at the 11th Northern Mariana Islands Football Association Ordinary Congress on 29 October 2021 that the global football governing organization received the islands' application for membership.

Northern Mariana Islands would then have competed in their first-ever AFC Asian Cup qualification playoff round, but the AFC excluded them from the draw.

=== 2023 Pacific Games ===
The Northern Mariana Islands competed in football at the Pacific Games for the first time in the 2023 edition of the tournament. The team was drawn into Group C along with Tahiti and Fiji. These matches would be the first time ever competing against Pacific island nations that are members of the Oceania Football Confederation. On 27 November 2023, Northern Mariana Islands records their second victory against FIFA-Affiliated team by winning 4-0 against American Samoa. The result was also the team's first-ever victory in the Pacific Games. Captain Jireh Yobech scored the team's first-ever goal in the regional tournament.

== Home stadium ==
The Northern Mariana Islands play their home matches at the Oleai Sports Complex, a multi-use stadium in Saipan. It is currently used mostly for football matches and has a capacity of 2,000 people. The surface is grass with an athletics track around the perimeter.

== Team image ==
=== Colors ===
The Northern Mariana Islands current home kit is all sky blue shirts, shorts and socks, with a white pattern on the shirt. Their away kit is the mirror image of this, all white shirts, shorts and socks with the pattern on the shirt in sky blue.

==== Kit history ====
Home

2002	2007	2009	2012	2013	2016

Away

2009–13	2016

=== Logo ===
The Northern Mariana Islands men's national football team shares the same logo as the Northern Mariana Islands Football Association. The logo consists of three elements in addition to the name of the federation. In the background is a Latte stone, a pillar (Chamorro language: haligi) capped by a hemispherical stone capital (tasa) with the flat side facing up. Used as building supports by the ancient Chamorro people, they are found throughout most of the Mariana Islands. In modern times, the latte stone is seen as a sign of Chamorro identity and is used in many different contexts. Overlaid on this is a football and overlaid again on this is a two-tone wave mirroring the colours of the national flag.

=== Nickname ===
The team is nicknamed the "Blue Ayuyu". The Ayuyu is the name given in the Mariana Islands to the Coconut crab, also known as the Robber crab.

== Results and fixtures ==
The following is a list of match results in the last 12 months, as well as any future matches that have been scheduled.

Win Draw Loss Fixture

== Coaching history ==
As of 28 May 2025

Head coach	Dates	Pld	W	D	L	Win %	Competitions
(Northern Mariana Islands) Stefan Bossler	1998–1999	7	5	0	2	71.4	1998 Micronesian Games; 1999 Micronesian Cup
(United States) Jeff Korytoski	2007	2	0	0	2	0.0	2008 East Asian Football Championship
(Northern Mariana Islands) Nicolas Swaim	2008	1	0	0	1	0.0	Marianas Cup
(Japan) Sugao Kambe	2009	3	0	0	3	0.0	2010 East Asian Football Championship
(Northern Mariana Islands) Nicolas Swaim	2010	1	0	1	0	0.0	Marianas Cup
(Japan) Chikashi Suzuki	2012	3	0	0	3	0.0	2013 EAFF East Asian Cup
(Malaysia) Koo Luam Khen	2013	3	0	0	3	0.0	2014 AFC Challenge Cup
(Japan) Kiyoshi Sekiguchi	2014–2017	6	1	0	5	16.7	2015 EAFF East Asian Cup; 2017 EAFF East Asian Cup
(Japan) Michiteru Mita	2017–2023	9	1	1	7	11.1	2019 EAFF E-1 Football Championship
(Japan) Konomo Suzuki	2024	2	1	1	0	50.0	
(Japan) Atsushi Hanita	2024-	2	0	0	2	0.0	

== Players ==
=== Current squad ===
The following players were called up for the friendlies against Guam in April 2024.

Caps and goals are correct as of 7 April 2024, after the match against Guam.

No.	Pos.	Player	Date of birth (age)	Caps	Goals	Club
1	GK	Christopher Aninzo	6 January 2000 (age 26)	6	0	(Northern Mariana Islands) MP United
12	GK	John Bucayo	10 March 2001 (age 25)	1	0	(Northern Mariana Islands) MP United
22	GK	Toves Merrick	1 December 2004 (age 21)	4	0	(Northern Mariana Islands) Kanoa
2	DF	Kohtaro Goto	23 May 2004 (age 22)	2	0	(United States) Park University
3	DF	Jerald Aquino	25 October 2004 (age 22)	5	0	(Philippines) Tuloy
4	DF	Ocanada Ronnel	26 February 2001 (age 25)	6	0	(Northern Mariana Islands) MP United
5	DF	Jehn Joyner	9 October 1997 (age 29)	10	0	Bank of Guam Strykers
6	DF	Lucas Knecht	30 March 1993 (age 33)	11	0	(United States) Georgia Southwestern State University
14	DF	Enrico del Rosario	21 March 1997 (age 29)	6	0	(United States) Northern Kentucky Nitro
16	DF	Dai Podziewski	31 August 2001 (age 25)	2	0	(United States) Suffolk University
20	DF	Euly Ermitanio	30 March 2000 (age 26)	3	0	University of Guam
21	DF	Jeremiah Diaz	12 January 2004 (age 22)	1	0	(United States) Park University
7	MF	Anthony Fruit	10 January 2001 (age 25)	2	0	(Germany) SG Aumund-Vegesack
8	MF	Michael Barry	10 November 1995 (age 31)	10	0	(United States) Saint Leo University
10	MF	Ryu Tanzawa	4 March 1998 (age 28)	3	0	(Northern Mariana Islands) Paire
13	MF	Jireh Yobech	8 July 1996 (age 30)	12	1	(Northern Mariana Islands) Inter Godfather's
17	MF	Ariel Narvaez Jr.	24 September 2005 (age 21)	5	1	(Northern Mariana Islands) Eleven Tiger
18	MF	Dev Bachani	4 May 2005 (age 21)	6	0	(Philippines) Tuloy
25	MF	Markus Toves	27 May 2007 (age 19)	6	2	(Philippines) Tuloy
9	FW	Nolan Ngewakl	8 July 2008 (age 18)	4	1	(Northern Mariana Islands) Latte
11	FW	Taka Borja	20 November 2003 (age 22)	2	1	(Northern Mariana Islands) Teen Ayuyu
15	FW	Sunjoon Tenorio	20 May 2001 (age 25)	3	1	(United States) Warner Pacific Knights
19	FW	Michah Griffin	26 October 1997 (age 29)	3	1	(Northern Mariana Islands) MP United
26	FW	Ruben Guerrero	unknown	4	2	(Northern Mariana Islands) Kanoa
23	FW	Richard Steele	30 March 2004 (age 22)	1	0	(United States) Park–Gilbert Buccaneers
24	FW	Joe Wang Miller	3 February 1989 (age 37)	17	4	Guam Shipyard

== Player records ==
As of 22 December 2024
Players in bold are still active with Northern Mariana Islands.

=== Most appearances ===
Rank	Player	Caps	Goals	Period
1	Nicolas Swaim	17	2	2009–2018
2	Joe Wang Miller	15	4	2008–2016
3	**Jireh Yobech**	14	1	2012–present
4	Lucas Knecht	11	0	2007–2014
5	Michael Barry	10	0	2012–2018
5	Trey Dunn	10	0	2012–2016
5	Joel Fruit	10	0	2012–2018
5	Jehn Joyner	10	0	2013–2018
5	Steven McKagen	10	1	2009–2013
10	Peter Loken	9	1	2009–2016
10	Johann Neutzel	9	0	2012–2016
10	Jonathan Takano	9	0	2014–2020
10	Kirk Schuler	9	3	2010–2016

=== Top goalscorers ===
Rank	Player	Goals	Caps	Ratio	Period
1	Joe Wang Miller	4	15	0.27	2009–2016
2	Kirk Schuler	3	9	0.33	2010–2016
3	Mark McDonald	2	2	1	2007
3	**Ruben Guerrero**	2	4	0.5	2023–present
3	Nicolas Swaim	2	17	0.12	2009–2018

=== Youngest appearances ===
Statistically, the Northern Mariana Islands have given senior international debuts in competitive matches to a larger number of very young players, those under 16 years of age, and more caps to veteran players, those over the age of forty, than any other nation.

Of the nine players globally who have made their international debuts before their fifteenth birthdays, three of them are from the Northern Mariana Islands. Both Joel Fruit and Kennedy Izuka made their international debuts in the 8–0 friendly loss to Guam in 2012. Izuka was aged 14 years and 242 days and is the seventh youngest debutant in history, while Fruit was the younger at 14 years and 177 days, the fourth youngest player recorded. However, Lucas Knecht featured for the Northern Mariana Islands Football Association on 1 April 2007 in an East Asian Football Federation Championship Qualifier, again versus Guam. Knecht was 14 years and 2 days old at the time making him the youngest male player to ever appear in an international match, 91 days younger than the previous record holder, Myanmar player Aung Kyaw Tun. In addition to the three fourteen year old debutants, three other players: Enrico del Rosario, Jehn Joyner and Scott Kim all made their debut prior to their sixteenth birthdays.

Youngest players
Name	Age	Birth date	Debut date	Competition	Opponent	Result
Lucas Knecht	14 years and 2 days	30 March 1993	1 April 2007	2008 EAFF Championship / Marianas Cup	Guam	0–9
Joel Fruit	14 years and 177 days	31 March 1998	24 November 2012	Friendly	Guam	0–8
Kennedy Izuka	14 years and 242 days	27 March 1998	24 November 2012	Friendly	Guam	0–8
Enrico del Rosario	15 years and 119 days	21 March 1997	18 July 2012	2013 EAFF East Asian Cup	Guam	1–3
Jehn Joyner	15 years and 144 days	9 October 1997	2 March 2013	2014 AFC Challenge Cup	Nepal	0–6
Scott Kim	15 years and 155 days	22 June 1997	24 November 2012	Friendly	Guam	0–8

Note: It is possible that Michael Barry may also have made a senior international appearance in the teams 1–1 Marianas Cup match against Guam in 2010 aged 14 years and 251 days, which would make him the eighth youngest debutant in history. However, although it is known that he was named in the match squad, it is not known whether he actually played in the game.

=== Oldest appearances ===
In addition to being the national team to have given the most senior team debuts to under sixteen players, they are also the team to have given the most international caps to players aged over 40, of the 88 players confirmed to have played an international football match after their fortieth birthdays, 11 of them are from the Northern Mariana Islands. Of these players Wesley Bogdan is the nation's current oldest player when he made his first senior international appearance in 2007 EAFF Championship qualifying match against Guam aged 48 years and 243 days. Only two players have made international appearances at an older age: Greek midfielder Giorgos Koudas, who played in a 2–0 defeat to Yugoslavia in 1995 aged 48 years and 301 days and Barrie Dewsbury, who played in Sark's 16–0 loss to Greenland at the 2003 Island Games aged 52 years and 11 days.

Oldest players
Name	Age	Birth date	Appearance date	Competition	Opponent	Result
Wesley Bogdan	48 years and 243 days	1 August 1958	1 April 2007	2008 EAFF Championship / Marianas Cup	Guam	0–9
Vince Stravino	43 years and 320 days	16 May 1963	1 April 2007	2008 EAFF Championship / Marianas Cup	Guam	0–9
David Dueñas	43 years and 94 days	11 December 1965	15 March 2009	2010 EAFF Championship	Mongolia	1–4
Daniel Westphal	42 years and 355 days	5 April 1970	6 March 2013	2014 AFC Challenge Cup	Bangladesh	0–4
Bruce Berline	42 years and 176 days	7 October 1964	1 April 2007	2008 EAFF Championship / Marianas Cup	Guam	0–9
Dale Roberts	42 years and 144 days	22 October 1966	15 March 2009	2010 EAFF Championship	Mongolia	1–4
Christopher Guerrero	41 years and 301 days	1 July 1966	27 April 2008	2008 EAFF Championship / Marianas Cup	Guam	2–3
José Dueñas	41 years and 207 days	20 August 1967	15 March 2009	2010 EAFF Championship	Mongolia	1–4
Mike Hall	41 years and 106 days	16 December 1965	1 April 2007	2008 EAFF Championship / Marianas Cup	Guam	0–9
Greg Elliott	40 years and 247 days	15 October 1969	19 June 2010	Marianas Cup	Guam	1–1
Tyce Mister	40 years and 15 days	10 March 1967	25 March 2007	Marianas Cup	Guam	2–3

== Competitive record ==
The Northern Mariana Islands have only entered three formal international competitions, the AFC Challenge Cup, the EAFF East Asian Championship and the Micronesian Games. As non-FIFA members seeking admission, they are not yet entitled to enter the FIFA World Cup. The Marianas Cup is not noted as a separate competition in this section as it is the name given to a perennial trophy contested each time the Northern Mariana Islands and Guam meet.

=== AFC Asian Cup ===
The team were eligible to enter the AFC Asian Cup through the AFC Challenge Cup from 2011. However, they did not enter the 2010 AFC Challenge Cup so they did not qualify. In failing to qualify for the 2014 AFC Challenge Cup, they also failed to qualify for the 2015 AFC Asian Cup.

AFC Asian Cup									AFC Asian Cup qualification					
Year	Result	Position	Pld	W	D*	L	GS	GA	Pld	W	D*	L	GF	GA
(Hong Kong) 1956	Not a member of the AFC								Not a member of the AFC					
(South Korea) 1960	Not a member of the AFC								Not a member of the AFC					
(Israel) 1964	Not a member of the AFC								Not a member of the AFC					
(Iran) 1968	Not a member of the AFC								Not a member of the AFC					
(Thailand) 1972	Not a member of the AFC								Not a member of the AFC					
(Iran) 1976	Not a member of the AFC								Not a member of the AFC					
(Kuwait) 1980	Not a member of the AFC								Not a member of the AFC					
(Singapore) 1984	Not a member of the AFC								Not a member of the AFC					
(Qatar) 1988	Not a member of the AFC								Not a member of the AFC					
(Japan) 1992	Not a member of the AFC								Not a member of the AFC					
(United Arab Emirates) 1996	Not a member of the AFC								Not a member of the AFC					
(Lebanon) 2000	Not a member of the AFC								Not a member of the AFC					
(China) 2004	Not a member of the AFC								Not a member of the AFC					
(Indonesia) (Malaysia) (Thailand) (Vietnam) 2007	Not a member of the AFC								Not a member of the AFC					
(Qatar) 2011	Did not enter								Did not enter					
(Australia) 2015	Did not qualify								AFC Challenge Cup					
(United Arab Emirates) 2019	Did not enter**								Did not enter**					
(Qatar) 2023	Did not enter**								Did not enter**					
(Saudi Arabia) 2027	Excluded								Excluded					
Total	—	0/18	–	–	–	–	–	–	0	0	0	0	0	0

**: As the first two rounds of qualifying for the 2019 and 2023 AFC Asian Cups were also the first two rounds of qualifying for the 2018 and 2022 FIFA World Cups, the Northern Mariana Islands were ineligible. Starting with the qualifying playoff round of the 2027 Asian Cup, they are allowed to qualify for the Asian Cup only.

=== AFC Challenge Cup ===
Having been accepted as an associate member in 2009, the Blue Ayuyus attempted to qualify for the AFC Challenge Cup once, in 2013. They were unsuccessful in qualification, losing all three matches without scoring a goal. The AFC Challenge Cup was discontinued by the AFC, with all nations now entering qualifying for the Asian Cup due to the expansion of the Asian Cup to the 24-nation format from the 16-nation one after the 2015 edition.

AFC Challenge Cup									Qualification record					
Year	Result	Position	Pld	W	D*	L	GS	GA	Pld	W	D*	L	GF	GA
(Bangladesh) 2006	Did not enter								Did not enter					
(India) 2008	Did not enter								Did not enter					
(Sri Lanka) 2010	Did not enter								Did not enter					
(Nepal) 2012	Did not enter								Did not enter					
(Maldives) 2014	Did not qualify								3	0	0	3	0	19
Total	—	0/5	0	0	0	0	0	0	3	0	0	3	0	19

=== EAFF E-1 Football Championship ===
The EAFF E-1 Football Championship is the primary source of competitive football for the Northern Mariana Islands since they reemerged onto the international scene and were accepted as a member of the EAFF. They have attempted to qualify for each edition of the EAFF E-1 Championship since they were admitted to the federation, each time without success.

East Asian Football Championship Finals									Preliminary competition					
Year	Result	Position	Pld	W	D*	L	GF	GA	Pld	W	D	L	GF	GA
East Asian Football Championship
(Japan) 2003	Not a member of the EAFF								Not a member of the EAFF					
(South Korea) 2005
(China) 2008	Did not qualify								2	0	0	2	2	12
(Japan) 2010	Did not qualify								3	0	0	3	3	12
EAFF East Asian Cup
(South Korea) 2013	Did not qualify								2	0	0	2	2	8
(China) 2015	Did not qualify								3	1	0	2	2	10
EAFF E-1 Football Championship
(Japan) 2017	Did not qualify								3	0	0	3	2	19
(South Korea) 2019	Did not qualify								3	0	1	2	1	14
(Japan) 2022	Did not participate								Not held					
(South Korea) 2025	Did not participate								Did not participate					
Total	—	0/8	0	0	0	0	0	0	16	1	1	14	12	75

=== Micronesian Games ===
Micronesia made their international debut at the 1998 Micronesia Games, though the tournament was not a formal part of the games, merely an exhibition. The formal name of the football tournament was the W.C.T.C. Shell Soccer Exhibition. The team were successful, winning the tournament, but have not entered since, although football has only sporadically been included in the games program.

Micronesian Games record
Year	Result	Position	Pld	W	D	L	GS	GA
(Palau) 1998	**Champions**	**1st**	**6**	**5**	**0**	**1**	**43**	**5**
(Pohnpei State) 2014	Did not enter							
(Yap State) 2018	Did not enter							
(Marshall Islands) 2024	No football tournament							
(Nauru) 2026	To be determined							
Total	1 Title	1/4	6	5	0	1	43	5

*Denotes draws includes knockout matches decided on penalty kicks. Red border indicates that the tournament was hosted on home soil. Gold, silver, bronze backgrounds indicates 1st, 2nd and 3rd finishes respectively. Bold text indicates best finish in tournament.

=== Micronesian Cup ===
Micronesian Cup record
Year	Round	Position	Pld	W	D*	L	GF	GA
(Federated States of Micronesia) 1999	Third place	3rd	1	0	0	1	0	7
Total	Runners-up	1/1	1	0	0	1	0	7

=== Marianas Cup ===
Marianas Cup record
Year	Round	Position	Pld	W	D*	L	GF	GA
(Northern Mariana Islands) (Guam) 2007	Runners-up	2nd	2	0	0	2	2	12
(Northern Mariana Islands) 2008	Runners-up	2nd	1	0	0	1	2	3
(Northern Mariana Islands) 2010	Champions	1st	1	0	1	0	1	1
(Guam) 2012	Runners-up	2nd	1	0	0	1	0	8

Remembering that only the tournaments that the senior national teams participated are counted.

== World rankings ==
=== FIFA ===
The Northern Mariana Islands, although a member of the East Asian Football Federation are not members of FIFA and so are not ranked. Additionally, although full members of the AFC, they have yet to be included on their ranking list of member associations.

The islands have been seeking FIFA membership since October 2021.

=== Elo rating ===
Northern Mariana Islands National Football Team Historic Elo Ratings.

The team has steadily fallen down the Elo ratings since their first official game against international opposition versus Guam in the 1998 Micronesian Games, from a starting point of 214 to their current position of 238. This is in part due to performance that has seen them gain only one win and one draw since their reemergence on the international scene in 2007 and part due to the fact that they have always been at or near the bottom of the rankings in a period where a number of new competing nations have emerged. Currently their ranking of 238 confirms their status as one of the world's worst senior international football teams. They are ranked directly below their fellow non-FIFA teams of Kiribati and Tibet but above Palau, though this is perhaps somewhat skewed by the fact that all three of these teams are essentially in hibernation having not competed internationally for a number of years. The nearest FIFA affiliated team to them is Eastern (American) Samoa, who are ranked 237th.

== Head-to-head record ==
Up to matches played on 22 December 2024.

Team	Pld	W	D	L	GF	GA	GD	WPCT
American Samoa	1	1	0	0	4	0	+4	100.00
Bangladesh	1	0	0	1	0	4	−4	0.00
Chinese Taipei	1	0	0	1	1	8	−7	0.00
Fiji	1	0	0	1	0	10	−10	0.00
Guam	17	2	2	13	19	58	−39	11.76
Macau	5	1	1	3	6	16	−10	20.00
Federated States of Micronesia	1	0	0	1	0	7	−7	0.00
Mongolia	4	0	0	4	1	25	−24	0.00
Nepal	1	0	0	1	0	6	−6	0.00
Palau	1	1	0	0	12	1	+11	100.00
Palestine	1	0	0	1	0	9	−9	0.00
Tahiti	1	0	0	1	0	5	−5	0.00
Tuvalu	1	0	0	1	1	4	−3	0.00
Total	36	5	3	28	44	153	−109	13.89

Source: Results

== Honors ==
=== Regional ===
- Micronesian Games
  - (gold) Gold medal (1): 1998

=== Friendly ===
- Marianas Cup (1): 2010^{s}

Notes

- ^{s} Shared titles.

== See also ==
- Northern Mariana Islands women's national football team
- Northern Mariana Islands national under-18 football team
