= Northern Mariana Islands national under-17 football team =

National association football team

Northern Mariana Islands U-17
- Nickname: Blue Ayuyus
- Association: Northern Mariana Islands Football Association
- Confederation: AFC
- Sub-confederation: EAFF (East Asia)
- Head coach: Suzuki Konomi
- Most caps: Sunjoon Tenorio (5)
- Top scorer: Sunjoon Tenorio (3)
- Home stadium: Oleai Sports Complex
- FIFA code: MNP
First colors	Second colors

FIFA ranking
- Current: N/R

First international
- Northern Mariana Islands 0–14 China (Wuhan, China PR; 25 September 2013)

Biggest win
- None

Biggest defeat
- Australia 23–0 Northern Mariana Islands (Shepparton, Australia; 5 October 2022)

AFC U-17 Championship
- Appearances: 0

The Northern Mariana Islands national under-17 football team is the under-17 football (soccer) team of the Northern Mariana Islands and is controlled by the Northern Mariana Islands Football Association. The team is not a member of FIFA and is therefore ineligible to qualify or participate in the FIFA U-17 World Cup.

== Competitive records ==
=== FIFA U-17 World Cup ===
- 1985 to 2025 - Non-FIFA member; ineligible

=== AFC U-17 Asian Cup ===
- 1985 to 2012 - Did not enter
- 2014 to 2025 - Did not qualify

== Players ==
=== Current Squad ===
The following 23 players were selected for the 2026 AFC U-17 Asian Cup qualification.

No.	Pos.	Player	Date of birth (age)	Club
1	GK	Landon Pudney		(Northern Mariana Islands Football Association) Latte FC
12	GK	Kapua Hocog		(Northern Mariana Islands Football Association) Matansa
23	GK	David Xing	11 September 2009 (age 17)	(Northern Mariana Islands Football Association) Kanoa
4	DF	Theo Joab	3 May 2010 (age 16)	(Northern Mariana Islands Football Association) MP United
5	DF	Jerz Navarro		(Northern Mariana Islands Football Association) Latte FC
20	DF	Moshe Sikkel	14 May 2009 (age 17)	(Northern Mariana Islands Football Association) MP United
22	DF	Eamon Tang	5 February 2010 (age 16)	(Northern Mariana Islands Football Association) Kanoa
16	DF	Jayson Tagabuel	16 October 2009 (age 17)	(Northern Mariana Islands Football Association) Kanoa
2	DF	Riku Takahashi	4 September 2009 (age 17)	(Northern Mariana Islands Football Association) MP United
3	DF	Taher Shakir	16 March 2009 (age 17)	(Northern Mariana Islands Football Association) Kanoa
13	DF	Kian Estolas	16 October 2010 (age 16)	(Northern Mariana Islands Football Association) Latte FC
19	DF	Julio Monserrat		(Northern Mariana Islands Football Association) Latte FC
11	MF	Bennet Haro	3 July 2009 (age 17)	(Northern Mariana Islands Football Association) Matansa
14	MF	Akoni Matsumoto (captain)	13 June 2009 (age 17)	(Northern Mariana Islands Football Association) Kanoa
18	MF	Gaius Ranada	2 November 2009 (age 17)	(Northern Mariana Islands Football Association) Matansa
6	FW	Yutaka Kadokura	4 August 2010 (age 16)	(Northern Mariana Islands Football Association) Matansa
8	FW	Bennetton Haro	3 July 2009 (age 17)	(Northern Mariana Islands Football Association) Matansa
10	FW	Stephen Yeom	30 July 2009 (age 17)	(Northern Mariana Islands Football Association) MP United
15	FW	Landon Springer		(Northern Mariana Islands Football Association) MP United
7	FW	Ezekiel Babauta		(Northern Mariana Islands Football Association) MP United
9	FW	Jerome Mejia		(Northern Mariana Islands Football Association) Latte FC
17	FW	Arstin Tagabuel	17 May 2010 (age 16)	(Northern Mariana Islands Football Association) Kanoa
21	FW	Taiga Namai-Scoggins	14 January 2010 (age 16)	(Northern Mariana Islands Football Association) MP United

== Recent results and fixtures ==
=== 2025 ===
22 November 2026 AFC U-17 ACQ	Malaysia	13–0	Northern Mariana Islands	Hanoi, Vietnam
19:00 UTC+7	Iman Danish 5', 16', 20'; Nabil Ikhwan 32'; Iman Irfan 34'; Arfan Haziq 40', 54', 90'; Arayyan Hakeem 45'; Alif Ashraf 50'; Nurikhwan Hazeem 60'; Navarro 66' (o.g.); Fahim Akmal 82'	Report		Stadium: Vietnam YFTC Field No. 3 Referee: Seo Dong-hwan (South Korea)

24 November 2026 AFC U-17 ACQ	Vietnam	14–0	Northern Mariana Islands	Hưng Yên, Vietnam
19:00 UTC+7	Trần Mạnh Quân 1', 16'; Nguyễn Văn Đương 21' (pen.), 24'; Chu Ngọc Nguyễn Lực 33'; Nguyễn Minh Thủy 35'; Trần Hoàng Việt 47'; Nguyễn Mạnh Cường 54'; Triệu Đình Vỹ 58'; Đào Quý Vương 74'; Trần Ngọc Sơn 75', 90+2'; Lê Trọng Đại Nhân 79', 81'	Report		Stadium: PVF Stadium; Referee: Rustam Choriev (Uzbekistan)

26 November 2026 AFC U-17 ACQ	Northern Mariana Islands	1–2	Singapore	Hanoi, Vietnam
16:00 UTC+7	Tagabuel 19'	Report	Eszouan 16'; Raoul 89'	Stadium: Vietnam YFTC Field No. 3 Referee: Ismaeel Fazal (Pakistan)

28 November 2026 AFC U-17 ACQ	Hong Kong	4–0	Northern Mariana Islands	Hanoi, Vietnam
19:00 UTC+7	Sephrey Ma 5'; Leung 53'; Eden Tung 71'; Lam 88'	Report		Stadium: Vietnam YFTC Field No. 3 Referee: Daniel Cook (Australia)

30 November 2026 AFC U-17 ACQ	Macau	2–0	Northern Mariana Islands	Hanoi, Vietnam
16:00 UTC+7	Leong Hou Teng 47'; Ng Kuan Hou 54'	Report		Stadium: Vietnam YFTC Field No. 3 Referee: Afsheen Naseer (Maldives)
