= Daniel Westphal =

Northern Mariana Islander footballer

Personal information
- Full name: Daniel Westphal
- Date of birth: 5 April 1970 (age 56)
- Place of birth: Northern Mariana Islands
- Position: Defender

Team information
- Current team: Wild Bills

Senior career*
Years	Team	Apps	(Gls)
2014–	Wild Bills		

International career^{‡}
2012–2013	Northern Mariana	6	(0)
- * Club domestic league appearances and goals as of 26 July 2013 ‡ National team caps and goals as of 26 July 2013

Daniel Westphal (born 5 April 1970) is a Northern Mariana Islander footballer who plays as a defender for Wild Bills.

== Career statistics ==
=== International ===
Appearances and goals by national team and year
National team	Year	Apps	Goals
Northern Mariana Islands	2012	3	0
Northern Mariana Islands	2013	3	0
Total		6	0
