= Kiyoshi Sekiguchi =

Japanese professional football manager

Personal information
- Place of birth: Japan

Managerial career
- Years: Team
- 2010: Northern Mariana Islands
- 2014–2017: Northern Mariana Islands

Kiyoshi Sekiguchi is a Japanese professional football manager. he the current technical Director J1 League club of Shonan Bellmare. Besides Japan, he has managed in Laos and the Northern Mariana Islands.

== Career ==
In 2010 and since 2014 he coached the Northern Mariana Islands national football team.
