= Cho Chung-yun =

South Korean footballer and manager

Cho Chung-Yun
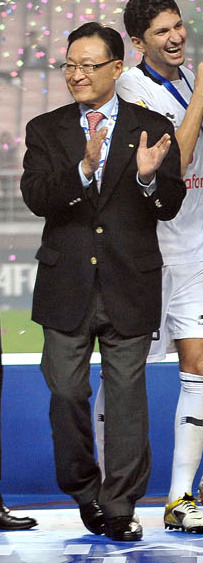

Personal information
- Full name: Cho Chung-Yun
- Date of birth: January 18, 1946 (age 80)
- Place of birth: Boeun County, South Korea
- Position: Midfielder

Youth career
- Korea University

Senior career*
Years	Team	Apps	(Gls)
?	Marine Corps FC		
?	Korea Development Bank FC		

Managerial career
- 1983–1986: Hyundai Horangi (Coach)
- 1986–1987: Hyundai Horangi
- 1989–1994: Jungdong High School
- * Club domestic league appearances and goals

- Cho Chung-yun
- Hangul: 조중연
- RR: Jo Jungyeon
- MR: Cho Chungyŏn

Cho Chung-Yun was a South Korean association football player and manager. He was president of Korea Football Association.

== Honours ==
=== Manager ===
Hyundai FC

- Professional Football Championship: 1986
