= Euly Ermitanio =

Northern Marianas footballer

Personal information
- Full name: Euly James Pajarillaga Ermitanio
- Date of birth: 30 March 2000 (age 26)
- Position: Defender

College career
Years	Team	Apps	(Gls)
2019–	University of Guam Tritons		

International career^{‡}
2016	Northern Mariana Islands	3	(0)
- ‡ National team caps and goals as of 18:39, 20 December 2021 (UTC)

Euly Ermitanio (born 30 March 2000) is a Northern Mariana Islands association footballer who currently plays for the Northern Mariana Islands national team.

== Youth career ==
Ermitanio played with Matansa FC as a youth.

== College career ==
For the 2019–2020 season Ermitanio was part of the University of Guam's college soccer team that competes in the Guam Soccer League.

== International career ==
In 2015 Ermitanio was part of the Northern Mariana squad that competed in 2016 AFC U-16 Championship qualification in Laos. The following month he was part of the national squad again for 2016 AFC U-19 Championship qualification in Thailand. He made his senior international debut on 30 June 2016 in a 2017 EAFF E-1 Football Championship match against Chinese Taipei.
