= Nicolas Swaim =

Northern Mariana Islander footballer and manager

Personal information
- Full name: Nicolas Benjamin Swaim
- Date of birth: 8 November 1977 (age 49)
- Place of birth: Northern Mariana Islands
- Positions: Defender; midfielder

Team information
- Current team: MP United

Senior career*
| Years | Team | Apps | (Gls) |
| 2008– | MP United | | |

International career^{‡}
| 2008–2018 | Northern Mariana | 17 | (2) |

Managerial career
- 2008: Northern Mariana Islands
- * Club domestic league appearances and goals as of 6 February 2015 ‡ National team caps and goals as of 6 February 2015

Nicolas Benjamin Swaim (born 8 November 1977) is a Northern Mariana Islander football player and manager.

== Career ==
As a defender he plays for the MP United.

In 2008, he made his debut for the Northern Mariana Islands national team as a player-coach.
