= Chikashi Suzuki =

Japanese football player and manager

Personal information
- Full name: Chikashi Suzuki
- Date of birth: January 29, 1959 (age 67)
- Place of birth: Miyagi, Japan

Youth career
- Years: Team
- Nihon University

Managerial career
- 1998: Liaison Kusatsu
- 2011: Tajikistan U16
- 2012: Northern Mariana Islands
- 2015: Sri Lanka Women

Chikashi Suzuki (鈴木 隣, Suzuki Chikashi; born January 29, 1959) is a former Japanese football player and manager.

== Career ==
Since July until December 2012 he coached the Northern Mariana Islands national team.

He has recorded 0-16 biggest defeat against Myanmar women's national team as Sri Lanka's head coach.
