= Christopher Aninzo =

Northern Mariana Islands footballer (born 2003)

Personal information
- Full name: Christopher dela Rosa Aninzo
- Date of birth: January 6, 2000 (age 26)
- Place of birth: Northern Mariana Islands
- Position: Goalkeeper

International career
Years	Team	Apps	(Gls)
2016–2022	Northern Mariana Islands	6	(0)

Christopher dela Rosa Aninzo (born January 6, 2000) is a Northern Mariana Islands footballer who plays as a goalkeeper.

== Early life ==
Aninzo was born in 2000 in the Northern Mariana Islands. He attended York St John University in England.

== Career ==
Aninzo is a Northern Mariana Islands international. He has captained the Northern Mariana Islands national football team.

== Personal life ==
Aninzo has worked as a goalkeeper coach. He has also worked as a personal trainer.
