= Don Farrell (historian) =

American educator (born 1947)

Don A Farrell
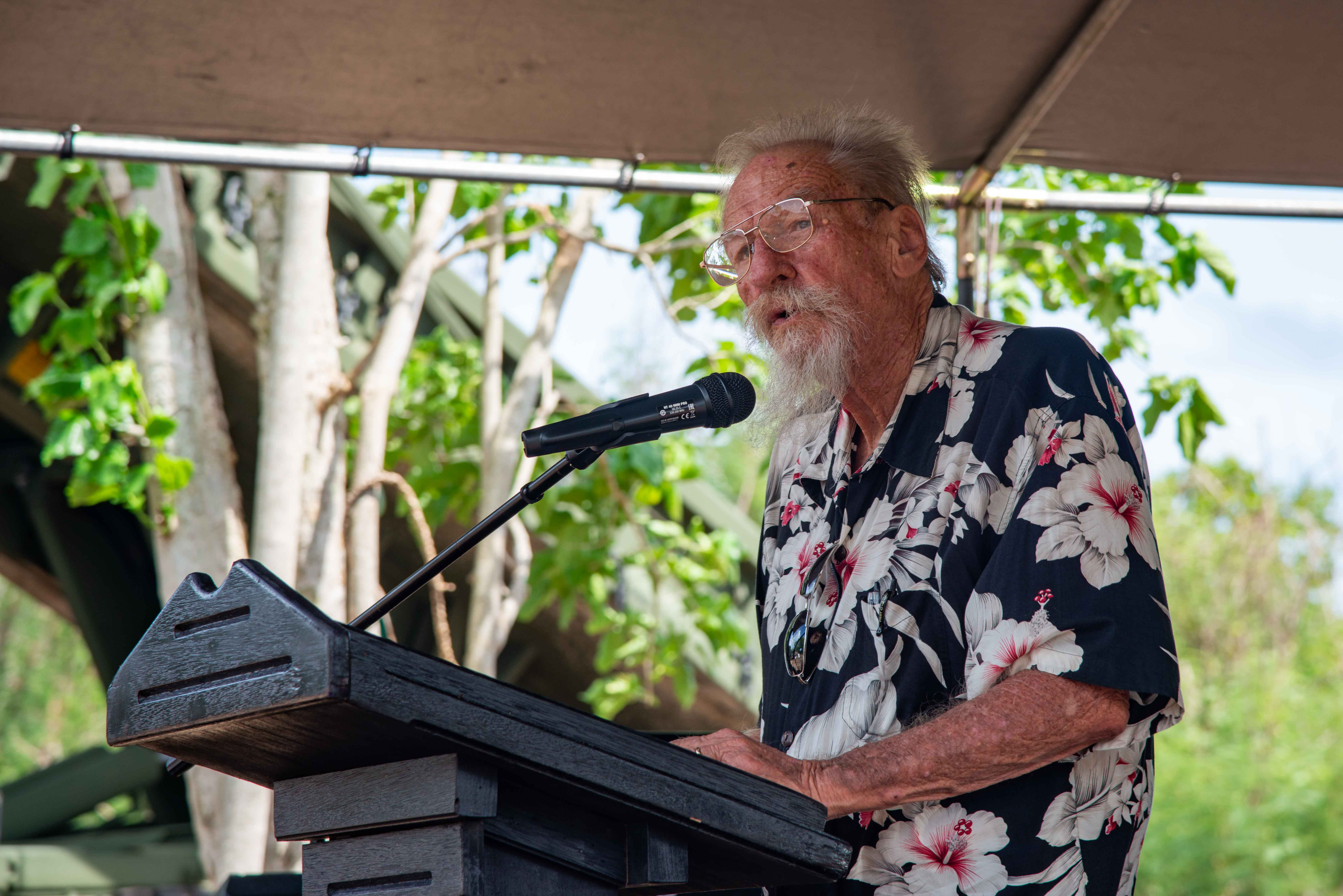
- Don Farrell in 2024
- Born: Don Allen Farrell; July 28, 1947 (age 79); Redmond, Oregon, U.S.
- Education: California State University San Bernardino
- Occupations: Historian, educator, researcher
- Writing career
- Language: English
- Genre: History
- Notable works: Tinian and The Bomb; Modern History of the Northern Mariana Islands; History of the Mariana Islands to Partition; The History of the Northern Mariana Islands; The Sacrifice of Guam: 1919-1943; The Americanization of Guam: 1898-1918; Liberation-1944: The Pictorial History of Guam
- Website: micronesianpubs.com

Don Allen Farrell (born July 28, 1947) is an American educator, local historian and author based on the island of Tinian in the Commonwealth of the Northern Mariana Islands (CNMI). He is known for his research and publications on the history of the Mariana Islands with an emphasis on World War II.

== Early life ==
Don Allen Farrell was born on July 28, 1947, in Redmond, Oregon.

Farrell received his high school diploma from Hillcrest High School in Salt Lake City, Utah in 1965 and afterwards joined the United States Air Force (USAF) where he served until 1971. Upon completing his tour of duty in the USAF, he enrolled at California State University, Fullerton, where he earned a BA in biology in 1973. He went on to earn a secondary teaching credential at California State University, San Bernardino, in 1974.

== Academic and public career ==
Farrell's academic career began at Rim of the World High School in Lake Arrowhead, California in 1975. In 1977, he moved to the island of Guam, where he taught at Inarajan Jr. High School and John F. Kennedy High School. During his early years on Guam, he began a fascination with and subsequent research into the history of WWII on that island. In 1980, he joined the Guam Legislature as a Public Relations Officer, and in 1982 took on the role of Chief of Staff for the Speaker of the Guam Legislature.

In 1987, Farrell moved to the island of Tinian where he worked as a high school teacher at Tinian High School and a Historical Consultant for the CNMI Public School System. From 1989 to 2014, Farrell served on the Senior Management Team of the Governor of Guam, as the Public Information Officer for the Tinian Municipal Government and as Chief of Staff for the Office of the Mayor of Tinian.

== Publications ==
=== Books ===
- Liberation–1944: The Pictorial History of Guam, Micronesian Productions (1984) ISBN 978-0-930839-00-0
- The Americanization of Guam: 1898–1918, Micronesian Productions (1986) ISBN 978-0-930839-01-7
- Tinian: A Brief History, Micronesian Productions (1988) ISBN 978-1-936626-47-2
- The Sacrifice of Guam: 1919–1943, Micronesian Productions (1991) ISBN 978-0-930839-02-4
- The History of the Northern Mariana Islands, CNMI Public School System (1991)
- Saipan: A Brief History, Micronesian Productions (1992) ISBN 978-0-930839-03-1
- Guam: A Brief History, Micronesian Productions (1994)
- Rota: A Brief History, Micronesian Productions (2003)
- History of the Mariana Islands to Partition (2012) ISBN 978-0-615-40730-2
- Modern History of the Northern Mariana Islands (2017)
- Tinian and The Bomb (2017)
- Atomic Bomb Island: Tinian, the Last Stage of the Manhattan Project, and the Dropping of the Atomic Bombs on Japan in World War II (2020)
- Seabees and Superforts at War (2024) ISBN 978-0-930839-04-8

=== Articles and essays ===
- "The Northern Marianas: Mine Eyes Have Seen the Glory" Glimpses of Micronesia and the Western Pacific (1979: Volume 19: 4)
- "Spare The Bullets: Save our People" Glimpses of Micronesia and the Western Pacific (1980: Volume 20: 4)
- "A Marriage Made in Micronesia" Guam Business News (November 1988)
- "The Partition of the Marianas: A Diplomatic History, 1898–1919" Isla: A Journal of Micronesian Studies (2.2 Dry Season, 1994: 273–301)
- "Operations Tearaway & Tattersalls: The Battle for The Northern Mariana Islands" Chapter 8 in Toni L. Carrell, (Ed.) CNMI Maritime Context: A Maritime History and Archaeological Overview of the Commonwealth of the Northern Mariana Islands, Ships of Discovery, 2012.

== Awards and citations ==
- Resolution of Commendation; Guam Legislature, 1987
- Proclamation of Commendation; Governor of Guam, 1987
- Ancient Order of the Chamorri; Governor of Guam, 1991
- CNMI Governor's Award for the Arts, 1991
- CNMI Governor's Award for Preservation of History, 2011
- CNMI Governor's Award for Publications in History, 2018
- CNMI Senate Commemorative Resolution, 2019
