= Matansa FC =

Northern Mariana Islands soccer club

Matansa
- Full name: Matansa Football Club
- Ground: NMI Soccer Training Center
- Capacity: 500
- League: MSL 1
- 2024 Fall: Regular season: 1st Final Series: Champions
Home colours	Away colours

Matansa FC is a professional association football club from the Northern Mariana Islands, currently competing in the MSL 1. The club also fields women and youth sides. It is one of the oldest football clubs in the Commonwealth.

== History ==
The club has participated in the Marianas Soccer League system since at least 2016. In 2021, Matansa's first team began competing under the name Eleven Tiger FC in Marianas Soccer League 1. That season, the club defeated Tan Holdings 4–2 in the final to win the league title. Richard Steele scored two goals en route to the upset victory.

Eleven Tiger repeated the championship for the Spring 2023 season, this time defeating MP United 2–1 in the final match. NMI international Sunjoon Tenorio scored both of his team's goals in the victory. Other members of the 2023 championship-winning squad were Ariel Narvaez, Eunsyu Hahn, Anthony Austria, Zhixiang Lin, Akira Kadokura, Jack Unsa, Bada Lee, Brandy Onopwy, Floyd Muna, Jimmy Lin, Brandon Tenorio, Dave Mafnas, Jamin Elliot, Seho Baek, and Dane Hodges. The club went on to also win the Fall 2023 season.

In December 2023, Eleven Tiger was the North Mariana Islands' representative in the first-ever Marianas Club Championship, hosting Guam Soccer League champions Wings FC. Eleven Tiger went on to win the match 2–1 with goals from Tanapon Unsa and Sunjoon Tenorio.

In Spring 2024, the club began competing in the top-flight as Matansa FC. The club finished in third for the season, earning them a spot in the playoffs. They were seeded against MP United in the semi-finals. The match was decided in a penalty shootout in which Matansa won with a score of 2–2 (5–3 on pens.) The club would face Kanoa in the finals, an eventual 4–2 defeat.

Matansa FC topped the league standings in Fall 2024, winning all of its six matches in the regular season and qualifying for the playoffs stage. The club would be drawn against the Marianas Development Team in the semi-final and trashing them 7-1 and qualifying for the final, once again challenging Kanoa for the title. The match saw a scoreline of 3–2 in favor of Matansa, earning another title for the club.

== Players ==
=== Current squad ===
As of 23 July 2023

Note: Flags indicate national team as defined under FIFA eligibility rules; some limited exceptions apply. Players may hold more than one non-FIFA nationality.

No.	Pos.	Nation	Player
—		NMI	Jordan Ruiz
—		NMI	Arif Khan
—		NMI	Harry Kapwich
—		NMI	Jacob Arkoh
—		NMI	Andy Chen
—		NMI	Amzad Khan
—		NMI	Lar Wongapa
—		NMI	Kamrul Kamrul
—		NMI	Song Park

No.	Pos.	Nation	Player
—		NMI	Tom Linden
—		NMI	Gabriel Arkoh
—		NMI	Woynha Hwang
—		NMI	Houston Cuohua
—		NMI	Gabriel Arkoh
—		NMI	Faycal El Karaa
—		NMI	Derek Cutting
—		NMI	Ratol Robait

Logo used by the club as Eleven Tiger FC

== Honours ==
- MSL 1:

Winners: Spring 2022, Spring 2023, Fall 2023
Runners-up: Spring 2024
Third Place: Spring 2025

- MSL 2:

Winners: Fall 2022

- Marianas Club Championship:

Winners: 2023

== International competition ==
Scores and results list Matansa's goal tally first.

Year	Competition	Round	Club	Home	Away	Aggregate
2023	Marianas Club Championship	—N/a	(Guam) Wings FC	2–1	—N/a	2–1
