= Chailang Palacios =

Chamorro activist

- Born: 1940s

Chailang Palacios is a Chamorro activist, teacher, and speaker from Saipan in the Northern Mariana Islands. She is a vocal opponent of nuclear weapons tests and is an advocate for international indigenous rights.

== Biography ==
Palacios was born in the early 1940s in Saipan. She worked as a Chamorro heritage custodian and a teacher.

In the 1980s, she advocated against Japanese dumping nuclear waste in the Mariana Trench. In 1984, she travelled to the United Kingdom with Maori elder Titewhai Harawira to speak on the topic of preventing nuclear dumping, as well as bringing attention to the rights to women of Chamorro background or other indigenous groups. As a result of that tour, British women formed the Women for a Nuclear Free and Independent Pacific, a group which sought to garner support for those same issues. The group also raised funds in order to allow more indigenous women to travel to the United Kingdom to tell their stories.

In 2015, she was a member of the TASA Role Model council, a group based in Tanapag, Achugao, San Roque, and As Matuis which seeks to improve the health of those living in that region. Chailang has also spoken out against the tourism industry in the Northern Marianas, stating that its costs outweigh its benefits. She claims that tourism increases natural degradation and harms local culture.
