= Marianas Cup =

Asian association football tournament for men's national teams

- Founded: 2007; 19 years ago
- Region: East Asia (EAFF)
- Teams: 2
- Current champions: Northern Mariana Islands (4th title)
- Most championships: Guam (7 titles)
- 2028

The Marianas Cup is an association football competition between neighboring Mariana Islands, Guam and the Northern Mariana Islands. Since the first edition in 2007, the tournament has been played between the national teams of varying age groups from the under-12 to senior level. The only exception was the 2013 edition of the tournament in which Guam fielded Quality Distributors, the reigning champions of the Guam Soccer League, against Northern Marianas U19 team in addition to a match between two national sides. Although it is intended as an annual competition, it has been played inconsistently, including hiatuses from 2011 to 2012, 2014 to 2016 and 2020 to 2022.

== Winners ==
Edition	Year	Hosts	Champions	Result	Runners-up
1	2007 details	Northern Mariana Islands; Guam	Guam	3–2	Northern Mariana Islands
1	2007 details	Northern Mariana Islands; Guam	Guam	9–0	Northern Mariana Islands
2	2008 details	Northern Mariana Islands	Guam	3–2	Northern Mariana Islands
3	2009 details	Guam	Guam	2–1	Northern Mariana Islands
4	2010 details	Northern Mariana Islands	Northern Mariana Islands Guam	1–1	
4	2010 details	Northern Mariana Islands	Northern Mariana Islands Guam	(shared)	
5	2013 details	Northern Mariana Islands	Northern Mariana Islands U-12	4–0	Guam U-12
6	2017 details	Guam	Guam U-18 All stars	1–0	Northern Mariana Islands U-18
7	2018 details	Northern Mariana Islands	Guam U-17	4–4 (5–3 p.)	Northern Mariana Islands U-17
8	2019 details	Guam	Guam U-23	6–2	Northern Mariana Islands U-23
9	2023 details	Northern Mariana Islands	Northern Mariana Islands U-23	0–1	Guam U-23
9	2023 details	Northern Mariana Islands	Northern Mariana Islands U-23	3–0	Guam U-23
10	2024 details	Northern Mariana Islands	Northern Mariana Islands U-20	2–0	Guam U-20
10	2024 details	Northern Mariana Islands	Northern Mariana Islands U-20	0-2 (5–4 p.)	Guam U-20

== Records ==
Team	Gold	Silver
Guam	7 (2007, 2008, 2009, 2010, 2017, 2018, 2019)	3 (2013, 2023, 2024)
Northern Mariana Islands	4 (2010, 2013, 2023, 2024)	6 (2007, 2008, 2009, 2017, 2018, 2019)
