= Guam national under-20 football team =

Guam U-20
- Nickname: Youth Matao
- Association: Guam Football Association
- Confederation: AFC (Asia)
- Sub-confederation: EAFF (East Asia)
- Head coach: Dominic Gadia
- Captain: Kai Pahl
- Home stadium: Guam National Football Stadium
- FIFA code: GUM
First colors	Second colors

First international
- Japan 14–0 Guam (Shizuoka, Japan; 11 May 1994)

Biggest win
- Guam 7–0 Northern Mariana Islands (Hagåtña, Guam; 8 August 2013)

Biggest defeat
- South Korea 28–0 Guam (Ho Chi Minh City, Vietnam; 6 November 2007)

The Guam national under-20 football team is the national association football youth team for the United States territory of Guam and is controlled by the Guam Football Association. They are affiliated with the Asian Football Confederation's East Asian Football Federation region.

== Results and fixtures ==
Win Draw Lose

=== 2026 ===
3 September 2026 2027 AFC U-20 Asian Cup qualification	Guam	3–0	Northern Mariana Islands	MFF Football Centre, Ulaanbaatar
13:00	Solomon 29', 50'; Isaac 82'	Report		Referee: Virendha Rai (Bhutan)

6 September 2026 2027 AFC U-20 Asian Cup qualification	Mongolia	3–0	Guam	MFF Football Centre, Ulaanbaatar
13:00	Erdenebaatar 16'; Mendjargal 34'; Khabul 66'	Report		Referee: Wong Wai Lun (Hong Kong)

== Current squad ==
The following players were called up for the 2023 AFC U-20 Asian Cup qualification, held in September 2022.

No.	Pos.	Player	Date of birth (age)	Club
1	GK	Miles Ganeb		(Guam Football Association) St. John's Knights
18	GK	Saena San Nicolas		(Guam Football Association) ASC Trust Islanders
21	GK	Jarish San Gil		(Guam Football Association) FD Friars
2	DF	Kai Pahl (captain)		(Guam Football Association) FD Friars
4	DF	Kevin Gatdula		(United States Soccer Federation) Coronado High School
5	DF	Levi Buckwalter		(Guam Football Association) Harvest Eagles
6	DF	Morgan McKenna	16 January 2003 (age 23)	(United States Soccer Federation) Muskingum University
11	DF	Bryan Nakamine		(Guam Football Association) John F. Kennedy High School
12	DF	Riley Rama		(Guam Football Association) Harvest Eagles
3	MF	Christian Kido	15 March 2003 (age 23)	(United States Soccer Federation) Muskingum University
7	MF	Ka'eo Gonsalves		(United States Soccer Federation) Richmond United Academy
8	MF	Eduardo Pedemonte	23 July 2003 (age 23)	(United States Soccer Federation) CCSF Rams
10	MF	Shuntaro Suzuki		(Guam Football Association) George Washington Geckos
14	MF	Elijah Ochoa		(United States Soccer Federation) Rockhurst Hawks
16	MF	Zaven Piolo		(Guam Football Association) Okkudo Bulldogs
17	MF	Nathaniel Mortera		(Guam Football Association) Tiyan Titans
9	FW	James Gomez		(United States Soccer Federation) PCC Athletic Lancers
13	FW	Joshua Benavente		(Guam Football Association) Quality Distributors
15	FW	Curtis Harmon		(Guam Football Association) St. John's Knights
20	FW	Kekoa Kukahiko		(United States Soccer Federation) St. John Bosco High School
