= Northern Mariana Islands national under-18 football team =

The Northern Mariana Islands national under-18 football team are the national under-18 football team of the Northern Mariana Islands. They play in the EAFF U-18 Youth Tournament and the M*League Division 1.

== Squad ==
Selected for 2013 EAFF U-18 Youth Tournament.

No.	Pos.	Player	Date of birth (age)	Caps	Goals	Club
1	GK	Christopher Aninzo	6 January 2000 (age 26)	5	0	(Northern Mariana Islands Football Association) MP United
21	GK	Hark Joshua Galarion	4 August 1999 (age 27)	2	0	(Northern Mariana Islands Football Association) Tan Holdings
19	DF	Michael Barry	11 October 1995 (age 31)	5	0	(Northern Mariana Islands Football Association) MP United
16	DF	Enrico del Rosario	21 March 1997 (age 29)	5	0	(Philippine Football Federation) Agila
17	DF	Kenneth Domingo	30 September 1996 (age 30)	4	0	(Northern Mariana Islands Football Association) Tan Holdings
14	DF	Kennedy Izuka	27 May 1998 (age 28)	3	0	(Northern Mariana Islands Football Association) MP United
23	DF	John Diego Masga	19 December 1998 (age 27)	4	0	(Northern Mariana Islands Football Association) MP United
4	DF	John Taisacan	9 August 1997 (age 29)	5	0	(Northern Mariana Islands Football Association) MP United
15	DF	Won-Young Kim	5 September 1998 (age 28)	5	0	(Northern Mariana Islands Football Association) Paire
28	DF	Jeng Hun Yang	4 January 1998 (age 28)	3	0	(Northern Mariana Islands Football Association) MP United
6	MF	Ryu Tanzawa	4 March 1998 (age 28)	5	0	(Northern Mariana Islands Football Association) Paire
10	MF	Scott Kim	22 June 1997 (age 29)	4	0	(Northern Mariana Islands Football Association) MP United
11	MF	Dakota Hall	30 April 1998 (age 28)	1	0	(Northern Mariana Islands Football Association) MP United
12	MF	Jireh Yobech	8 July 1996 (age 30)	5	0	(Northern Mariana Islands Football Association) MP United
18	MF	Joel Fruit	31 May 1998 (age 28)	5	0	(Northern Mariana Islands Football Association) Paire
8	FW	Jordan Butcher	29 May 1998 (age 28)	2	0	(Northern Mariana Islands Football Association) MP United
9	FW	Yoshi Ray Mafnas	2 June 1997 (age 29)	5	0	(Northern Mariana Islands Football Association) Tan Holdings
20	FW	Jehn Joyner	9 October 1997 (age 29)	3	0	(Northern Mariana Islands Football Association) MP United

== 2017 fixtures ==
16 September 2017 AFC U-16 Championship qualification	Indonesia	18–0	Northern Mariana Islands	Thailand

18 September 2017 AFC U-16 Championship qualification	Northern Mariana Islands	0–10	Thailand	Thailand

20 September 2017 AFC U-16 Championship qualification	Laos	10–0	Northern Mariana Islands	Thailand

24 September 2017 AFC U-16 Championship qualification	Northern Mariana Islands	1–11	Timor-Leste	Thailand
