= East Asian Football Federation =

International governing body of association football in East Asia

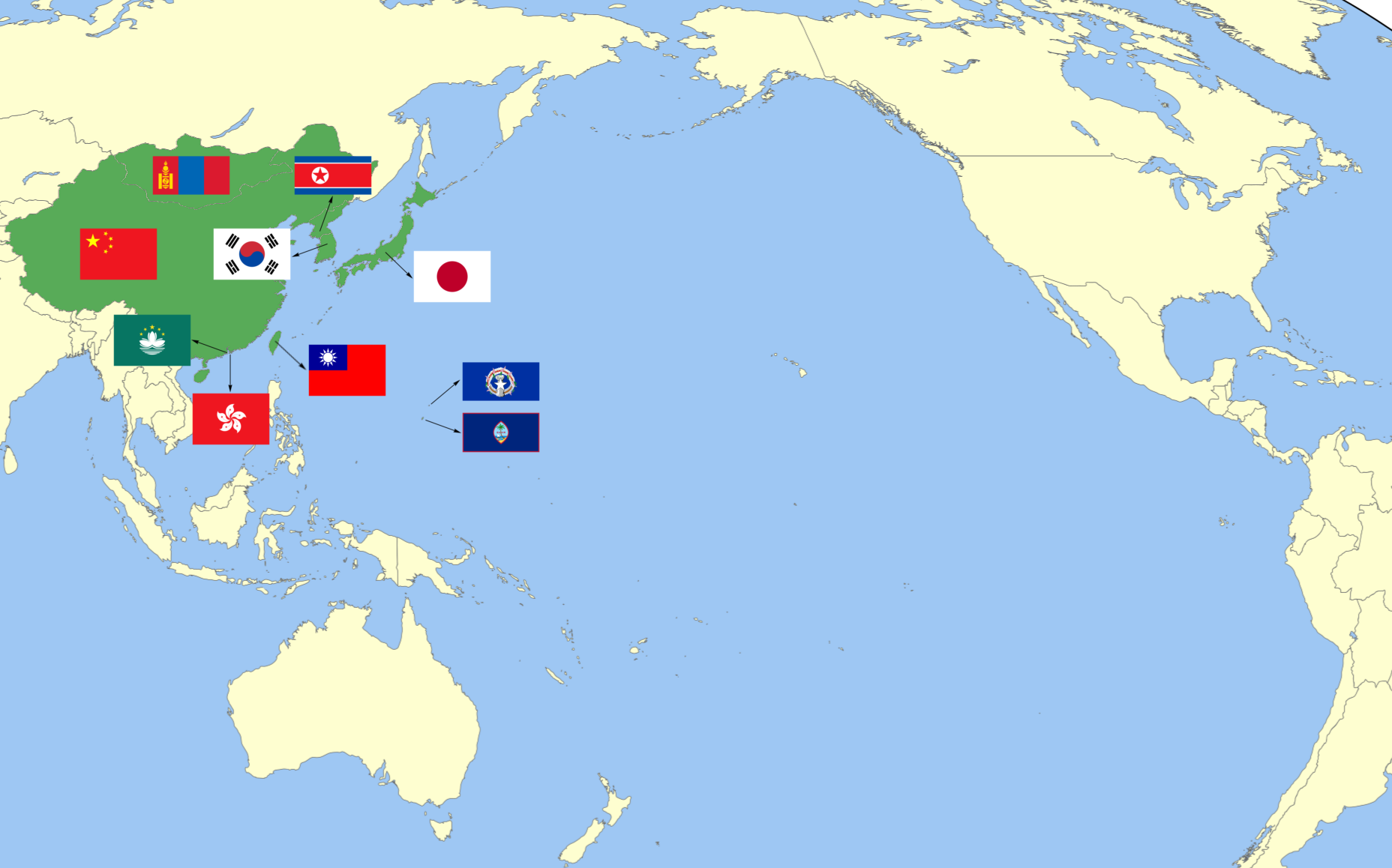
- EAFF members
- Formation: 28 May 2002; 24 years ago
- Type: Sports organization
- Headquarters: Tokyo, Japan
- Members: 10 member associations
- President: (South Korea) Chung Mong-gyu
- Parent organization: AFC
- Website: eaff.com (in English, Chinese, Japanese, and Korean)

The East Asian Football Federation (EAFF) is an international governing body of association football in East Asia. It was founded on 28 May 2002.

== Presidents ==
| President | Years |
|---|---|
| (Japan) Shunichiro Okano | 2002–2005 |
| (South Korea) Chung Mong-joon | 2006 |
| (China) Xie Yalong | 2006–2007 |
| (Japan) Junji Ogura | 2008–2010 |
| (South Korea) Cho Chung-yun | 2011–2012 |
| (South Korea) Chung Mong-gyu | 2013 |
| (China) Zhang Jian | 2014–2015 |
| (Japan) Kozo Tashima | 2016–2017 |
| (South Korea) Chung Mong-gyu | 2018–2021 |
| (China) Du Zhaocai | 2022–2023 |
| (Japan) Kozo Tashima | 2023–2025 |
| (South Korea) Chung Mong-gyu | 2025–present |

== Member associations ==
EAFF has 10 member associations. All of them are members of the Asian Football Confederation, including the Northern Mariana Islands Football Association, which is an associate member of the AFC (previously an associated member of the Oceania Football Confederation) until its full membership was approved in December 2020. The Palau Football Association was being considered as a possible future member of the association in 2009. Northern Mariana Islands national football team was a provisional member from December 2006 to September 2008.

| Association | EAFF affiliation | National team | League |
|---|---|---|---|
| China PR | 2002 | Men's; U23; U20; U17; F; BS; Women's; U20; U17 | Chinese Super League |
| Chinese Taipei | 2002 | Men's; U23; U20; U17; F; BS; Women's; U20; U17 | Taiwan Football Premier League |
| Guam | 2002 | Men's; U23; U20; U17; F; BS; Women's; U20; U17 | Guam Soccer League |
| Hong Kong | 2002 | Men's; U23; U20; U17; F; BS; Women's; U20; U17 | Hong Kong Premier League |
| Japan | 2002 | Men's; U23; U20; U17; F; BS; Women's; U20; U17 | J1 League |
| (North Korea) Korea DPR | 2002 | Men's; U23; U20; U17; F; BS; Women's; U20; U17 | DPR Korea League |
| (South Korea) Korea Republic | 2002 | Men's; U23; U20; U17; F; BS; Women's; U20; U17 | K League 1 |
| Macau | 2002 | Men's; U23; U20; U17; F; BS; Women's; U20; U17 | Liga de Elite |
| Mongolia | 2002 | Men's; U23; U20; U17; F; BS; Women's; U20; U17 | Mongolia Premier League |
| Northern Mariana Islands | 2020 | Men's; U23; U20; U17; F; BS; Women's; U20; U17 | Marianas Soccer League |

== Sponsors ==
| Country | Official sponsors |
|---|---|
| Japan | Aiful |
| Japan | Credit Saison |
| Japan | ParadigmｰShift IDNet work's |
| Japan | Rally Japan |
| Japan | Sfida |
| Japan | S&B Foods |
| None | Brave Software |

| Country | Official supporters |
|---|---|
| None | eaff.com |
| None | E-1 NFT |
| None | Nuarca |
| None | Brave Software |

== FIFA World Rankings ==
=== Men's national teams ===
Rankings are calculated by FIFA.

FIFA Rankings (as of 18 November 2026)
| EAFF* | FIFA | +/− | National Team | Points |
|---|---|---|---|---|
| 1 | 17 | Steady | Japan | 1684.61 |
| 2 | 30 | ▲2 | South Korea | 1560.02 |
| 3 | 95 | ▲1 | China | 1245.57 |
| 4 | 121 | ▼1 | North Korea | 1151.05 |
| 5 | 152 | ▲1 | Hong Kong | 1035.23 |
| 6 | 177 | ▼1 | Chinese Taipei | 918.87 |
| 7 | 190 | Steady | Mongolia | 874.47 |
| 8 | 193 | Steady | Macau | 858.03 |
| 9 | 203 | Steady | Guam | 819.54 |

=== Women's national teams ===
Rankings are calculated by FIFA.

FIFA Rankings (as of 20 October 2026)
| EAFF* | FIFA | +/− | National Team | Points |
|---|---|---|---|---|
| 1 | 5 | Steady | Japan | 1994.43 |
| 2 | 12 | ▼1 | North Korea | 1916.52 |
| 3 | 17 | ▲2 | South Korea | 1791.13 |
| 4 | 18 | ▼2 | China | 1786.8 |
| 5 | 38 | ▲2 | Chinese Taipei | 1573.33 |
| 6 | 80 | ▲1 | Hong Kong | 1277.95 |
| 7 | 97 | ▲1 | Guam | 1201.73 |
| 8 | 149 | ▼3 | Mongolia | 1035.67 |
| 9 | 175 | ▲1 | Macau | 846.53 |

== Competitions ==
| Competition | Current | Champions | Details | Runners-up | Next |
Men's national teams
| EAFF E-1 Football Championship | 2025 | Japan | RR | South Korea | 2028 |
| EAFF U-15 Men's Championship | 2025 | Japan | Final | South Korea | |
Women's national teams
| EAFF E-1 Women's Football Championship | 2025 | South Korea | RR | China | 2028 |
| EAFF U-15 Women's Championship | 2024 | North Korea | Final | China | 2026 |

== Competitive record by nation ==
For each tournament, the flag of the host country and the number of teams in each finals tournament (in brackets) are shown.

Legend
| 1st | Champions | QF | Quarter-finals |
| 2nd | Runners-up | R16 | Round of 16 |
| 3rd | Third place | GS | Group stage |
| 4th | Fourth place | 1S | First knockout stage |
| SF | Semi-finals | | Hosts |
| Q | Qualified for upcoming tournament | | |
| • | Did not qualify | | |
| × | Did not enter, withdrawn, banned, or disqualified | | |

=== FIFA World Cup ===
| Team | 1930 (Uruguay) (13) | 1934 (Kingdom of Italy) (16) | 1938 (French Third Republic) (15) | 1950 (Fourth Brazilian Republic) (13) | 1954 (Switzerland) (16) | 1958 (Sweden) (16) | 1962 (Chile) (16) | 1966 (England) (16) | 1970 (Mexico) (16) | 1974 (West Germany) (16) | 1978 (Argentina) (16) | 1982 (Spain) (24) | 1986 (Mexico) (24) | 1990 (Italy) (24) | 1994 (United States) (24) | 1998 (France) (32) | 2002 (Japan) (South Korea) (32) | 2006 (Germany) (32) | 2010 (South Africa) (32) | 2014 (Brazil) (32) | 2018 (Russia) (32) | 2022 (Qatar) (32) | 2026 (Canada) (Mexico) (United States) (48) | 2030 (Morocco) (Portugal) (Spain) (48) | 2034 (Saudi Arabia) (48) | Years |
|---|---|---|---|---|---|---|---|---|---|---|---|---|---|---|---|---|---|---|---|---|---|---|---|---|---|---|
| South Korea | Did not exist | | | × | GS | × | • | × | • | • | • | • | GS | GS | GS | GS | 4th | GS | R16 | GS | GS | R16 | GS | | | 12 |
| Japan | × | × | × | × | • | × | • | × | • | • | • | • | • | • | • | GS | R16 | GS | R16 | GS | R16 | R16 | R32 | | | 7 |
| North Korea | Did not exist | | | × | × | × | × | QF | × | • | × | • | • | • | • | × | × | • | GS | • | • | × | • | | | 2 |
| China | × | × | × | × | × | • | × | × | × | × | × | • | • | • | • | • | GS | • | • | • | • | • | • | | | 1 |
| Total (4 teams) | 0 | 0 | 0 | 0 | 1 | 0 | 0 | 1 | 0 | 0 | 0 | 0 | 1 | 1 | 1 | 2 | 3 | 2 | 3 | 2 | 2 | 2 | 2 | TBD | TBD | 21 |

=== FIFA Women's World Cup ===
| Team | 1991 (China) (12) | 1995 (Sweden) (12) | 1999 (United States) (16) | 2003 (United States) (16) | 2007 (China) (16) | 2011 (Germany) (16) | 2015 (Canada) (24) | 2019 (France) (24) | 2023 (Australia) (New Zealand) (32) | Years |
|---|---|---|---|---|---|---|---|---|---|---|
| Japan | GS | QF | GS | GS | GS | 1st | 2nd | R16 | QF | 9 |
| China | QF | 4th | 2nd | QF | QF | • | QF | R16 | GS | 8 |
| South Korea | • | • | • | GS | • | • | R16 | GS | GS | 4 |
| North Korea | • | × | GS | GS | QF | GS | × | • | × | 4 |
| Chinese Taipei | QF | • | • | • | • | • | • | • | • | 1 |
| Total (5 teams) | 3 | 2 | 3 | 4 | 3 | 2 | 3 | 3 | 3 | 26 |

=== AFC Asian Cup ===
| Team | (British Hong Kong) 1956 (4) | (South Korea) 1960 (4) | (Israel) 1964 (4) | (Iran) 1968 (5) | (Thailand) 1972 (6) | (Iran) 1976 (6) | (Kuwait) 1980 (10) | (Singapore) 1984 (10) | (Qatar) 1988 (10) | (Japan) 1992 (8) | (United Arab Emirates) 1996 (12) | (Lebanon) 2000 (12) | (China) 2004 (16) | (Indonesia) (Malaysia) (Thailand) (Vietnam) 2007 (16) | (Qatar) 2011 (16) | (Australia) 2015 (16) | (United Arab Emirates) 2019 (24) | (Qatar) 2023 (24) | (Saudi Arabia) 2027 (24) | Years |
|---|---|---|---|---|---|---|---|---|---|---|---|---|---|---|---|---|---|---|---|---|
| South Korea | 1st | 1st | 3rd | • | 2nd | • | 2nd | GS | 2nd | • | QF | 3rd | QF | 3rd | 3rd | 2nd | QF | SF | | 15 |
| China | Not an AFC member | | | | | 3rd | GS | 2nd | 4th | 3rd | QF | 4th | 2nd | GS | GS | QF | QF | GS | | 13 |
| Japan | × | × | × | • | × | • | × | × | GS | 1st | QF | 1st | 1st | 4th | 1st | QF | 2nd | QF | | 10 |
| North Korea | Not an AFC member | | | | | •• | 4th | × | • | GS | × | • | • | × | GS | GS | GS | × | | 5 |
| Hong Kong | 3rd | • | 4th | 5th | • | • | • | • | • | • | • | • | • | • | • | • | • | GS | | 4 |
| Chinese Taipei | • | 3rd | × | 4th | × | × | OFC member | | | • | • | • | • | • | • | • | • | • | | 2 |
| Total (6 teams) | 2 | 2 | 2 | 2 | 1 | 1 | 3 | 2 | 3 | 3 | 3 | 3 | 3 | 3 | 4 | 4 | 4 | 4 | TBD | 49 |

=== Men's football at the Summer Olympics ===
| Team | 1900 (France) (3) | 1904 (United States) (3) | | 1908 (United Kingdom) (6) | 1912 (Sweden) (11) | 1920 (Belgium) (14) | 1924 (France) (22) | 1928 (Netherlands) (17) | 1936 (Germany) (16) | 1948 (United Kingdom) (18) | 1952 (Finland) (25) | 1956 (Australia) (11) | 1960 (Italy) (16) | 1964 (Japan) (14) | 1968 (Mexico) (16) | 1972 (West Germany) (16) | 1976 (Canada) (13) | 1980 (Soviet Union) (16) | 1984 (United States) (16) | 1988 (South Korea) (16) | 1992 (Spain) (16) | 1996 (United States) (16) | 2000 (Australia) (16) | 2004 (Greece) (16) | 2008 (China) (16) | 2012 (United Kingdom) (16) | 2016 (Brazil) (16) | 2020 (Japan) (16) | 2024 (France) (16) | Years |
|---|---|---|---|---|---|---|---|---|---|---|---|---|---|---|---|---|---|---|---|---|---|---|---|---|---|---|---|---|---|---|
| South Korea | • | • | • | • | • | • | • | • | | QF | | | | GS | | | | | | GS | GS | GS | GS | QF | GS | 3rd | QF | 5th | | 11 |
| Japan | • | • | • | • | • | • | • | • | QF | | | GS | | QF | 3rd | | | | | | | GS | QF | GS | GS | 4th | GS | 4th | QF | 12 |
| China | • | • | • | • | • | • | • | • | GS | | | | | | | | | | | GS | | | | | GS | | | | | 3 |
| Chinese Taipei | • | • | • | • | • | • | • | • | | GS | | | GS | | | | | | | | | | | | | | | | | 2 |
| North Korea | • | • | • | • | • | • | • | • | | | | | | | | | QF | | | | | | | | | | | | | 1 |
| Total (5 teams) | 0 | 0 | 0 | 0 | 0 | 0 | 0 | 0 | 2 | 2 | 0 | 1 | 1 | 2 | 1 | 0 | 1 | 0 | 0 | 2 | 1 | 2 | 2 | 2 | 3 | 2 | 2 | 2 | 1 | 29 |

=== Women's football at the Summer Olympics ===
| Team | 1996 (United States) (8) | 2000 (Australia) (8) | 2004 (Greece) (10) | 2008 (China) (12) | 2012 (United Kingdom) (12) | 2016 (Brazil) (12) | 2020 (Japan) (12) | 2024 (France) (12) | Years |
|---|---|---|---|---|---|---|---|---|---|
| China | 2nd | 5th | 9th | 5th | • | 8th | 10th | | 6 |
| Japan | 7th | • | 7th | 4th | 2nd | • | 8th | | 5 |
| North Korea | • | • | • | 9th | 9th | • | × | | 2 |
| Total (3 teams) | 2 | 1 | 2 | 3 | 2 | 1 | 2 | TBD | 13 |
