= Northern Mariana Islands national under-20 football team =

National association football team

Northern Mariana Island U-20
- Nickname: Blue Ayuyus
- Association: Northern Mariana Islands Football Association
- Confederation: AFC
- Sub-confederation: EAFF (East Asia)
- Most caps: Sunjoon Tenorio (5)
- Top scorer: Sunjoon Tenorio (3)
- Home stadium: Oleai Sports Complex
- FIFA code: NMI
First colors	Second colors

First international
- North Korea 4–1 Northern Mariana Islands (Hagåtña, Guam; 7 August 2013)

Biggest win
- None

Biggest defeat
- Thailand 21–0 Northern Mariana Islands (Phnom Penh, Cambodia; 6 November 2019)

The Northern Mariana Islands national under-20 football team is the under-20 football (soccer) team of the Northern Mariana Islands and is controlled by the Northern Mariana Islands Football Association.

== Results and fixtures ==
Win Draw Lose

=== 2026 ===
==== 2027 AFC U-20 Asian Cup qualification ====
31 August 2026 2027 AFC U-20 Asian Cup qualification	Northern Mariana Islands	0–7	Mongolia	MFF Football Centre, Ulaanbaatar
13:00		Report	Erdenebaatar 14', 86'; Dayan 35'; Enkhbayar 51', 59'; Erkhes 90+3'; Jason 90+4'	Referee: Kasun Lakmal Weerakkody (Sri Lanka)

3 September 2026 2027 AFC U-20 Asian Cup qualification	Guam	3–0	Northern Mariana Islands	MFF Football Centre, Ulaanbaatar
13:00	Solomon 29', 50'; Isaac 82'	Report		Referee: Virendha Rai (Bhutan)

== Competitive records ==
=== AFC U-20 Asian Cup ===
AFC U-20 Asian Cup record									Qualification record					
Year	Round	Pos	Pld	W	D	L	GF	GA	Pld	W	D	L	GF	GA
(Malaysia) 1959	Not member of AFC								Not member of AFC					
(Malaysia) 1960	Not member of AFC								Not member of AFC					
(Thailand) 1961	Not member of AFC								Not member of AFC					
(Thailand) 1962	Not member of AFC								Not member of AFC					
(Malaysia) 1963	Not member of AFC								Not member of AFC					
(South Vietnam) 1964	Not member of AFC								Not member of AFC					
(Japan) 1965	Not member of AFC								Not member of AFC					
(Philippines) 1966	Not member of AFC								Not member of AFC					
(Thailand) 1967	Not member of AFC								Not member of AFC					
(South Korea) 1968	Not member of AFC								Not member of AFC					
(Thailand) 1969	Not member of AFC								Not member of AFC					
(Philippines) 1970	Not member of AFC								Not member of AFC					
(Japan) 1971	Not member of AFC								Not member of AFC					
(Thailand) 1972	Not member of AFC								Not member of AFC					
(Iran) 1973	Not member of AFC								Not member of AFC					
(Thailand) 1974	Not member of AFC								Not member of AFC					
(Kuwait) 1975	Not member of AFC								Not member of AFC					
(Thailand) 1976	Not member of AFC								Not member of AFC					
(Iran) 1977	Not member of AFC								Not member of AFC					
(Bangladesh) 1978	Not member of AFC								Not member of AFC					
(Thailand) 1980	Not member of AFC								Not member of AFC					
(Thailand) 1982	Not member of AFC								Not member of AFC					
(United Arab Emirates) 1985	Not member of AFC								Not member of AFC					
(Saudi Arabia) 1986	Not member of AFC								Not member of AFC					
(Qatar) 1988	Not member of AFC								Not member of AFC					
(Indonesia) 1990	Not member of AFC								Not member of AFC					
(United Arab Emirates) 1992	Not member of AFC								Not member of AFC					
(Indonesia) 1994	Not member of AFC								Not member of AFC					
(South Korea) 1996	Not member of AFC								Not member of AFC					
(Thailand) 1998	Not member of AFC								Not member of AFC					
(Iran) 2000	Not member of AFC								Not member of AFC					
(Qatar) 2002	Not member of AFC								Not member of AFC					
(Malaysia) 2004	Not member of AFC								Not member of AFC					
(India) 2006	Not member of AFC								Not member of AFC					
(Saudi Arabia) 2008	Not member of AFC								Not member of AFC					
(China) 2010	Did not enter								Did not enter					
(United Arab Emirates) 2012	Did not enter								Did not enter					
(Myanmar) 2014	Did not enter								Did not enter					
(Bahrain) 2016	Did not qualify								4	0	0	4	0	38
(Indonesia) 2018	Withdrew								Withdrew					
(Uzbekistan) 2020	Cancelled								4	0	0	4	3	44
(Uzbekistan) 2023	Did not qualify								4	0	0	4	0	42
Total	–	0/41	–	–	–	–	–	–	12	0	0	12	3	124
