= Northern Mariana Islands Football Association =

Governing body of association football in Northern Mariana Islands

AFC
- Short name: NMIFA
- Founded: 2005
- FIFA affiliation: N/A
- AFC affiliation: 2020 (Ordinary membership)
- EAFF affiliation: 2008 (Full membership)
- President: Jerry Tan
- Website: http://www.nmifa.com

The Northern Mariana Islands Football Association (NMIFA) is the governing body of football in the Northern Mariana Islands in the northwestern Pacific Ocean. It was founded in 2005 by US Attorney Peter Coleman to replace the now-defunct NMISF, which had administered the sport on the islands up to around 2002. The Association received associate membership into the East Asian Football Federation in December 2006, with full membership coming in August 2008. The association was admitted as a provisional member of the Asian Football Confederation in July 2009.

The association runs the M*League and Women's M*League, the top levels of domestic competition within the commonwealth. It operates men's, women's, and youth national football teams.

== History ==
Football in the Northern Mariana Islands were originally administered by the Northern Mariana Islands Soccer Federation set up around the 1980s and by 2002, they had been given associate membership of the Oceania Football Confederation. However the NMISF gradually ceased operations. In 2005, the Northern Mariana Islands Football Association was set up to replace them but the OFC often refused the new association grants to grow the game. They joined the East Asian Football Federation in 2006 and formally left the OFC in 2009 and joined the Asian Football Confederation in order to gain access to Asian grants.

On 9 December 2020 during the 30th AFC Congress, the Northern Mariana Islands Football Association (NMIFA) became the 47th full member association of the AFC. In October 2021 FIFA Head of MA Governance Rolf Tanner announced at the 11th Northern Mariana Islands Football Association Ordinary Congress that the global organization had received the island's application for membership. Through the NMIFA's work, it aimed for football to replace baseball as the most popular sport in the territory.

== See also ==
- Northern Mariana Islands national football team
- Northern Mariana Islands women's national football team
