= MP United FC (Northern Mariana Islands) =

MP United
- Full name: MP United Football Club
- Nickname: Typhoons
- Founded: January 1, 2008; 18 years ago
- Stadium: Navy Field Hill
- League: Marianas Soccer League
Home colours	Away colours

The MP United Football Club is based in Saipan and competes in the Northern Mariana Islands Football Association's men's league.

== Squad (2023) ==
Note: Flags indicate national team as defined under FIFA eligibility rules; some limited exceptions apply. Players may hold more than one non-FIFA nationality.

No.	Pos.	Nation	Player
1	GK	NMI	Christopher Aninzo
6	MF	NMI	Jake Lee
7	FW	NMI	Jack Unsa
8	MF	NMI	Scott Kim
9	DF	NMI	John Taisacan
11	MF	NMI	Jireh Yobech
12	FW	NMI	Raymond Mercado
13	MF	NMI	Chris Park
14	FW	NMI	Jehn Joyner
15	DF	NMI	Kennedy Izuka

No.	Pos.	Nation	Player
17	FW	NMI	Zhi Peng Lin
21	DF	NMI	Jason Kim
22	MF	NMI	Dakota Hall
24	MF	NMI	Kyle Chung
25	MF	NMI	Brian Lee
28	FW	NMI	Daniel Lin
29	DF	NMI	David Yang
31	DF	NMI	John Diego Masga
36	DF	NMI	Bob Kim
39	GK	NMI	Greg Sablan
46	MF	NMI	Aaron Lee
