= Latte FC =

Latte
- Full name: Latte Football Club
- Founded: February 2009; 17 years ago (as Tan Holdings FC)
- Stadium: Oleai Sports Complex
- Owner: Tan Holdings Corporation
- League: Marianas Soccer League 1
Home colours	Away colours

Latte FC is a professional football club currently competing in the Marianas Soccer League 1. The club plays on the island of Saipan. The club was known as Tan Holdings FC because of a sponsorship by the Tan Holdings Corporation from its founding to August 2023 when it rebranded to its current name.

== Achievements ==
- M*League Division 1:

3 titles (2015 Spring, 2016 Spring, 2021 Spring)
