= 2012 M-League Division 1 =

M-League Division 1
- Season: 2012

The 2012 M*League Division 1 was the sixth season of top-flight football in Northern Marianas Islands. The league was divided into two parts, the Winter League and the Fall League. The Winter League was won by IFC Wild Bills, and the Fall League was won by Tan Holdings FC

== Spring League ==
The Spring league was played in a normal league format, each team played the others twice and the team in first place following the completion of all games won the championship.

=== League table ===
The precise results for this season was a normal league format in which each team played the others twice.

Pos	Team	Pld	W	D	L	GF	GA	GD	Pts	Qualification or relegation
1	IFC Wild Bills (C)	8	7	0	1	26	7	+19	21	
2	Inter Godfather's	8	4	2	2	19	11	+8	14	
3	Paire FC	8	2	3	3	10	14	−4	9	
4	KFAS	8	2	3	3	13	14	−1	9	
5	SKY FC (R)	8	0	2	6	5	27	−22	2	2013 M*League Division 2

Rules for classification: 1) points; 2) goal difference; 3) number of goals scored.
(C) Champions; (R) Relegated

=== Results ===
Home \ Away	IWB	GOD	PFC	KFAS	SKY	IWB	GOD	PFC	KFAS	SKY
IFC Wild Bills		1–0	5–0	3–2	3–0		4–1	2–1		6–0
Inter Godfather's	–		4–0	3–3	8–2				W	2–0
Paire FC	–	1–1		2–1	5–0				1–1	D
KFAS	3–2	–	–		3–3					W
SKY FC	–	–	–	–						

Updated to match(es) played on 23 March 2008. Source:
Legend: Blue = home team win; Yellow = draw; Red = away team win.

The scores for rounds five and nine are not known, although it is known that Inter Saipan, FC Arirang and Onwell beat Ol' Aces, Multinational and Independents respectively in round five and that Inter Saipan beat Multinational while Onwell drew with FC Aririang in round six. The result of the match between Independents and Ol' Aces in round nine is not known while none of the results in round ten are known.

== Fall League ==
The Fall League consisted of a reduced number of teams, with only Inter Saipan (competing under their new name of Inter Godfather's) and Multinational FC from the Spring League choosing to compete. Wild Bill's and Pacific Telecom, who competed in the previous season also competed, with Pacific Telecom competing under the name MP United - PTI. A group stage was held to confirm who would play whom in the semi-finals.

=== Group stage ===
The results of the group stage are not known, it is also not known whether teams played each other once or twice.

Pos	Team	Pld	W	D	L	GF	GA	GD	Pts	Qualification
1	Inter Godfather's (Q)	0	0	0	0	0	0	0	0	Semi-finals
2	Wild Bill's (Q)	0	0	0	0	0	0	0	0	Semi-finals
3	MP United - PTI (Q)	0	0	0	0	0	0	0	0	Semi-finals
4	Multinational FC (Q)	0	0	0	0	0	0	0	0	Semi-finals

Rules for classification: 1) points; 2) goal difference; 3) number of goals scored.
(Q) Qualified for the phase indicated

=== Semi finals ===
Inter Godfathers	1-0	Multinational FC
Unknown	Source

Wild Bill's	1-2	MP United - PTI
Unknown	Source	Unknown

=== Third-place match ===
Wild Bill's	2-0	Multinational FC
Unknown	Source

=== Final ===
23 November 2008?

Inter Godfather's	1-1	MP United - PTI
Unknown	Source	Unknown
Penalties
Unknown	5-4	Unknown
