= List of football clubs in the Northern Mariana Islands =

This is a partial list of football clubs in the Northern Mariana Islands.

== Clubs ==
- IFC Wild Bills
- Inter Godfather's
- Kanoa FC
- KFAS
- Matansa FC
- Marianas Pacific United Football Club
- Paire FC
- Tan Holdings FC
- Tinian Premier FC
