= List of association football leagues without promotion and relegation =

The following is a list of association football leagues which do not or did not have a promotion and relegation process.

Leagues within the scope of this list are:

- Top-tier football leagues with no relegation system
  - In countries without lower-tier leagues
  - In countries with lower-tier leagues not integrated to the top-tier league; closed model
- Recognized Division II or lower leagues without promotion and relegation.

Excluded are:

- Any Division II or lower leagues with promotion but without relegation

== Leagues ==
=== Current ===
==== Top tier leagues ====
League	Country	Confederation	First season	Without relegation since
FFAS Senior League	American Samoa	OFC	1976	1976
AFA Senior Male League	Anguilla	CONCACAF	1997	1997
A-League Men	Australia, New Zealand	AFC / OFC	2005–06	2005
A-League Women	Australia, New Zealand	AFC / OFC	2008–09	2008
BFA Senior League	Bahamas	CONCACAF	1991	1991
Premier League of Belize	Belize	CONCACAF	2011	2011
Bonaire League	Bonaire	CONCACAF	1960	1960
BVIFA National Football League	British Virgin Islands	CONCACAF	2009	2009
Canadian Premier League	Canada	CONCACAF	2019	2019
Cook Islands Round Cup	Cook Islands	OFC	1992	1992
Liga Nacional de Cuba	Cuba	CONCACAF	1912	1912
Liga Dominicana de Fútbol	Dominican Republic	CONCACAF	2014	2014
Gibraltar National League (Note: Gibraltar Second Division was dissolved at the end of 2018–19 season; all remaining teams were included in the new Gibraltar National League.)	Gibraltar	UEFA	2019–20	2019–20
Budweiser G-League	Guam	AFC	1990	1990
Lao League 1	Laos	AFC	1990	1990
Liga MX (Note: Ascenso MX was dissolved at the end of 2019–20 season, introducing the new Liga de Expansión MX.)	Mexico	CONCACAF	1943	2019–20
Marianas Soccer League 1	Northern Mariana Islands	AFC	2006	2006
Philippines Football League	Philippines	AFC	2017	2017
PFF Women's League	Philippines	AFC	2016–17	2016–17
Liga Puerto Rico Pro	Puerto Rico	CONCACAF	2018	2018
Superior Femenino de la Liga Puerto Rico	Puerto Rico	CONCACAF	2018	2018
Campionato Sammarinese di Calcio (Note: Serie A2, the second-tier of Sanmarinese football was dissolved at the end of 1994–95 season; all teams were included in the new Campionato Sammarinese di Calcio.)	San Marino	UEFA	1985–86	1995–96
Saint-Martin Senior League	Collectivity of Saint Martin	CONCACAF	1970	1970
Singapore Premier League	Singapore	AFC	1996	1996
Sint Maarten Premier League	Sint Maarten	CONCACAF	1975	1975
Telekom S-League	Solomon Islands	OFC	2000	2000
Sri Lanka Super League	Sri Lanka	AFC	2021	2021
Provo Premier League	Turks and Caicos Islands	CONCACAF	1999	1999
Tuvalu A-Division	Tuvalu	OFC	1980	1980
Major League Soccer	United States, Canada	CONCACAF	1996	1996
National Women's Soccer League (Note: The NWSL and USL Super League are both officially sanctioned as top-level women's leagues.)	United States	CONCACAF	2013	2013
USL Super League	United States	CONCACAF	2024–25	2024–25
(United States Virgin Islands) USVISF Premier League	U.S. Virgin Islands	CONCACAF	1998	1998

==== Lower division leagues ====
League	Division	Country	Confederation	First season	Without promotion since	Next highest league	Relegation to
National Premier Leagues	2	Australia	AFC	2005–06	2005	A-League Men	Various (State-level leagues)
USL Championship (Note: Established in 2011 as USL Pro; rebranded as United Soccer League (USL) in 2015 and the USL Championship in 2019.)	2	United States (Note: The USL Championship featured teams from Canada as late as 2019, but all teams since that season have been US-based.)	CONCACAF	2017 (Note: First season as second-level league.)	2017	Major League Soccer	None
Liga de Expansión MX (Note: Ascenso MX was dissolved at the end of 2019–20 season, introducing the new Liga de Expansión MX.)	2	Mexico	CONCACAF	2020–21	2020–21	Liga MX	Serie A
MLS Next Pro	3	United States; Canada	CONCACAF	2022	2022	USL Championship	None
National Independent Soccer Association	3	United States	CONCACAF	2019–20	2019–20	USL Championship	None
USL League One	3	United States	CONCACAF	2019	2019	USL Championship	None

=== Defunct or inactive ===
==== Top tier leagues ====
League	Country	Confederation	First season	Last season	Years without relegation	Relegation to
National Soccer League	Australia	OFC	1977	2003–04	1977–2004	None (underperforming clubs were de facto relegated to the state leagues but there was no set criterion for relegation)
Philippine Premier League	Philippines	AFC	2019	2019	2019	None
United Football League	Philippines	AFC	2010	2016	2016	United Football League Division 2 (2010–2015)
Puerto Rico Soccer League	Puerto Rico	CONCACAF	2008	2017	2008–2017	None
North American Soccer League (1968–84)	United States; Canada	CONCACAF	1968	1984	1968–1984	None
Women's Professional Soccer	United States	CONCACAF	2009	2011	2009–2011	None
Women's United Soccer Association	United States	CONCACAF	2001	2003	2001–2003	None
BeNe League	Belgium; Netherlands	UEFA	2012-13	2014-15	2012-2015	None
Chinese Women's Super League (1997–2010); National Women's Football League (2011–2014)	China	AFC	1997	2014	1997-2013	National Women's Football League (Early years)

==== Lower division leagues ====
League	Division	Country	Confederation	First season	Last season	Years without promotion	Next highest league
North American Soccer League	2	United States; Puerto Rico	CONCACAF	2011	2017	2011–2017	Major League Soccer
USSF Division 2 Professional League	2	United States; Canada; Puerto Rico	CONCACAF	2010		2010	Major League Soccer
USL Pro / United Soccer League (Note: The USL organization dropped "Pro" from the league branding in advance of the 2015 season.)	3	United States; Canada	CONCACAF	2011	2016 (Note: Last season as third-level league. In 2017, the USL was granted second-division status alongside the NASL; it became the sole second-level league in 2018 and was renamed the USL Championship in 2019.)	2011–2016	North American Soccer League
