= 2019 M-League Division 1 =

M*League Division 1
- Season: 2019

The 2019 M*League Division 1, played between top-level football club in the Northern Mariana Islands, consists of two tournaments: the Spring League and the Fall League.

== Teams ==
A total of seven teams competed in the league. MP United, which won the 2018 Spring League, did not compete, and were replaced by Teen Ayuyu, which are the national U-18 team. The 2018 Fall League was abandoned due to the damages caused by Typhoon Yutu.

Location football club of M*League Division 1
- Kanoa
- KFAS
- Matansa
- Paire
- Tan Holdings
- Teen Ayuyu (NMI U-18)
- The Old B Bank

== Spring League ==
=== Regular season ===
Pos	Team	Pld	W	D	L	GF	GA	GD	Pts	Qualification or relegation
1	Teen Ayuyu (NMI U-18)	6	6	0	0	57	3	+54	18	Final Four
2	Paire	6	5	0	1	27	8	+19	15	Playoff Round
3	The Old B Bank	6	3	0	3	13	9	+4	9 (Note: Head-to-head result: The Old B Bank 4–1 Tan Holdings.)	Playoff Round
4	Tan Holdings	6	3	0	3	22	12	+10	9	Playoff Round
5	Kanoa	6	2	1	3	16	30	−14	7	Playoff Round
6	KFAS	6	1	1	4	16	44	−28	4	Playoff Round
7	Matansa	6	0	0	6	7	52	−45	0	Playoff Round

Source: NMIFA, RSSSF

=== Playoffs ===
Playoff Round
Teen Ayuyu (NMI U-18)	Bye
28 April
Tan Holdings	12
Kanoa	1
28 April
Paire	6
Matansa	0
25 April
The Old B Bank	7
KFAS	2

Final Four
5 May
Teen Ayuyu (NMI U-18)	4
Tan Holdings	2
5 May
Paire	1
The Old B Bank	4

Final
19 May
Teen Ayuyu (NMI U-18)	5
The Old B Bank	0
Third Place Match
9 May
Tan Holdings	7
Paire	2

== Fall League ==
Pos	Team	Pld	W	D	L	GF	GA	GD	Pts
1	All Blue (NMI U-19) (C)	8	7	1	0	33	9	+24	22
2	Paire	8	5	1	2	33	14	+19	16
3	Tan Holdings	8	5	0	3	33	23	+10	15
4	The Old B Bank	8	1	0	7	8	28	−20	3
5	KFAS	8	1	0	7	10	43	−33	3

Source: NMIFA, RSSSF
(C) Champions
