= 2013 M-League Division 1 =

M-League Division 1
- Season: 2013

The 2013 M*League Division 1 was the seventh season of top-flight football in Northern Marianas Islands. The Spring League was won by IFC Wild Bills.
