= 2013–14 M-League Division 1 =

M-League Division 1
- Season: 2013–14

The 2013–14 M*League Division 1 was the eighth season of top-flight football in Northern Marianas Islands. The League was won by IFC Wild Bills.
