= 2024 Marianas Soccer League 1 =

Football league season

Marianas Soccer League 1
- Season: 2024
- Champions: Spring: Kanoa; Fall: Matansa

The 2024 Marianas Soccer League 1 is the 4th season of the Marianas Soccer League 1. The top-level football tournament played in the Northern Mariana Islands. It Consists of two tournaments, Spring and Fall, that function like the Apertura and Clausura format used by Latin American leagues.

== Teams ==
A total of five teams competed in the league, Paire didn't participate the following fall league.

Location of clubs that competed in the 2024 season

== Spring league ==
=== Regular season ===
Pos	Team	Pld	W	D	L	GF	GA	GD	Pts	Qualification
1	Kanoa (C)	8	6	2	0	29	9	+20	20	Qualification to Spring Playoffs
2	MP United	8	4	3	1	21	12	+9	15	Qualification to Spring Playoffs
3	Matansa	8	3	3	2	21	12	+9	12	Qualification to Spring Playoffs
4	Paire	8	2	0	6	16	28	−12	6	Qualification to Spring Playoffs
5	Marianas Development Team	8	1	0	7	6	32	−26	3	

Source: RSSSF
(C) Champions

=== Playoffs ===
The qualified teams are seeded based on their placement on the regular season. The playoffs started on May 19, 2024.

Semi-finals
1	Kanoa	5
4	Paire	0
3	Matansa	2(5)
2	MP United	2(3)

Finals
Kanoa	4
Matansa	2
Third-place Playoff
MP United	4
Paire	1

== Fall league ==
=== Regular season ===
Pos	Team	Pld	W	D	L	GF	GA	GD	Pts	Qualification
1	Matansa (C)	6	6	0	0	25	5	+20	18	Advance to Fall Playoffs
2	Kanoa	6	4	0	2	21	6	+15	12	Advance to Fall Playoffs
3	MP United	6	2	0	4	14	19	−5	6	Advance to Fall Playoffs
4	Marianas Development Team	6	0	0	6	0	30	−30	0	Advance to Fall Playoffs

Source: RSSSF
(C) Champions

=== Playoffs ===
The teams were seeded using their placement in the regular season. The playoffs started on November 10, 2024.

Semi-finals
1	Matansa	7
4	Marianas Development Team	1
3	MP United	2
2	Kanoa	3

Finals
Matansa	3
Kanoa	2
Third-place Playoff
Marianas Development Team	0
MP United	3
