= Marianas Soccer League 2 =

Association football league in the Northern Mariana Islands

- Country: Northern Mariana Islands
- Confederation: AFC
- Number of clubs: 7
- Level on pyramid: 2
- Current champions: Matansa FC (2023)
- Website: www.nmifa.com

The Marianas Soccer League 2 (or MSL 2) is the men's second level football competition of the Northern Mariana Islands and is under the auspices of the Northern Mariana Islands Football Association. It is below the Marianas Soccer League 1, but there is no regular promotion/relegation between the two competitions. Despite being a men's tournament, the NMI women's developmental national team has competed in the league.

== Recent champions ==
- 2021: The One FC
- 2022: Hana FC
- 2023: Matansa FC
- 2024: The Old B Bank FC
- Spring 2025: Kanoa FC
- Fall 2025: Kanoa FC

== Top scorers ==
MSL 2 Top Scorers
Season	Player	Club	Goals	Ref.
2023	(Northern Mariana Islands) John Canape	The Old B Bank	13	
2024	(Northern Mariana Islands) John Canape	The Old B Bank	9	
