= Paire =

Paire may refer to:

== People ==
- Benoît Paire (born 1989), French tennis player, younger brother of Thomas
- Pepper Paire (1924 – 2013), baseball catcher and infielder
- Thomas Paire (born 1985), French tennis player, older brother of Benoît

== Places ==
- Hall du Paire, multi-purpose arena in Pepinster, Belgium

== Sports ==
- Paire FC, football club from Saipan in the Northern Mariana Islands
