= The Old B Bank FC =

Northern Mariana Islands soccer club

- Ground: NMI Soccer Training Center
- Capacity: 500
- League: MSL 2
- 2024: Regular season: 1st Final Series: Champions

The Old B Bank FC is an association football club from the Northern Mariana Islands, currently competing in the Marianas Soccer League 2. The club has previously competed in the Marianas Soccer League 1, mostly recently in 2021.

== History ==
In 2023, the club finished third in the Marianas Soccer League 2, defeating MP United 6–0 in the bronze medal match. That season, Old B Bank’s John Canape won the league scoring race with thirteen goals. The next season, Old B Bank defeated Paire FC 1–0 in the championship match to win the title after finishing the regular season with a 6-0-1 record. John Canape was again the league's top scorer with nine goals.

== Honours ==
- MSL 2:

Winners: 2024
Runner-up: 2019
Third Place: 2023
