= 2010 Northern Mariana Championship =

Northern Mariana Championship
- Season: 2010

The 2010 Northern Mariana Championship was the fifth season of top-flight football in Northern Marianas Islands. The competition was won by Marianas Pacific United.

== Participating teams ==
The following teams participated in the 2010 Northern Mariana Championship:

- Inter Godfather's
- Korean Senior (named Korean FA in the previous season.)
- Korean Junior (named Korean FA Juniors in the previous season.)
- Marianas Pacific United
- Matansa FC
- Tan Holdings FC
- Wild Bill's
- Young Guns (competed in the previous season as Independents and played as an U-18 team in this season.)

== Final table ==
A number of results for the season are not known and no full table is available which includes correct goal difference for any part of the season,

Pos	Team	Pld	W	D	L	GF	GA	GD	Pts
1	Marianas Pacific United (C)	14	13	1	0	64	8	+56	40
2	Korean Senior	14	10	2	2	-	-	—	32
3	Inter Godfather's	14	8	1	5	-	-	—	25

Rules for classification: 1) points; 2) goal difference; 3) number of goals scored.
(C) Champions

== Known results ==
Home \ Away	GOD	KOS	KOJ	MPU	MAN	TAN	WIL	YOU
Inter Godfather's			3–1	0–2		5–1		7–1
Korean Senior	3–2		5–3	0–4		3–0	3–2	3–1
Korean Junior		0–2					0–5	3–1
Marianas Pacific United	1–1	5–2	4–2		4–0	4–1	2–0	8–0
Matansa			6–0			4–3	1–1	2–0
Tan Holdings	0–7							
Wild Bill's	2–1				4–3			6–1
Young Guns	0–1		0–5			2–3		

Updated to match(es) played on 25 July 2010. Source:
Legend: Blue = home team win; Yellow = draw; Red = away team win.

Beyond the games listed above, the following results, though not scores are known:

- Week 5: Korean Senior beat Matansa and Wild Bill's beat Tan Holdings.
- Week 8: Inter Godfather's beat Matansa and Korean Junior beat Tan Holdings.
- Week 12: Inter Godfather's beat an unknown team, and unknown team beat Young Guns and Korea Juniors achieved a draw at best against unknown opposition.
- Final Round: Only the result between MP United and Young Guns is known.
