= Promotion and relegation =

Transfer of teams between divisions in a sports league system

Luton Town have played in the top five tiers of the English football league system. Their history shows how teams can move quickly between the levels through successive promotions or relegations.

Promotion and relegation is used by sports leagues as a process where teams can move up and down among divisions in a league system, based on their performance over a season. Leagues that use promotion and relegation systems are sometimes called open leagues. In a system of promotion and relegation, the best-ranked team(s) in a lower division are promoted to a higher division for the next season, and the worst-ranked team(s) in the higher division are relegated to the lower division for the next season. During the season, teams that are high enough in the league table that they would qualify for promotion are sometimes said to be in the promotion zone, and those at the bottom are in the relegation zone (colloquially the drop zone or facing the drop). These can also involve being in zones where promotion and relegation is not automatic, but subject to a playoff.

An alternate system of league organization, used primarily in Australia, Canada, the Philippines, Singapore, and the United States, is a closed model based on licensing or franchises. This maintains the same teams from year to year, with occasional admission of expansion teams and relocation of existing teams, and with no team movement between the major league and minor leagues. Some competitions, such as the Belgian Pro League in football or the Super League in rugby league, operate hybrid systems which allow for promotion and relegation between divisions but which allocate this based on a mix of financial and administrative scores with competition performance.

== Overview ==
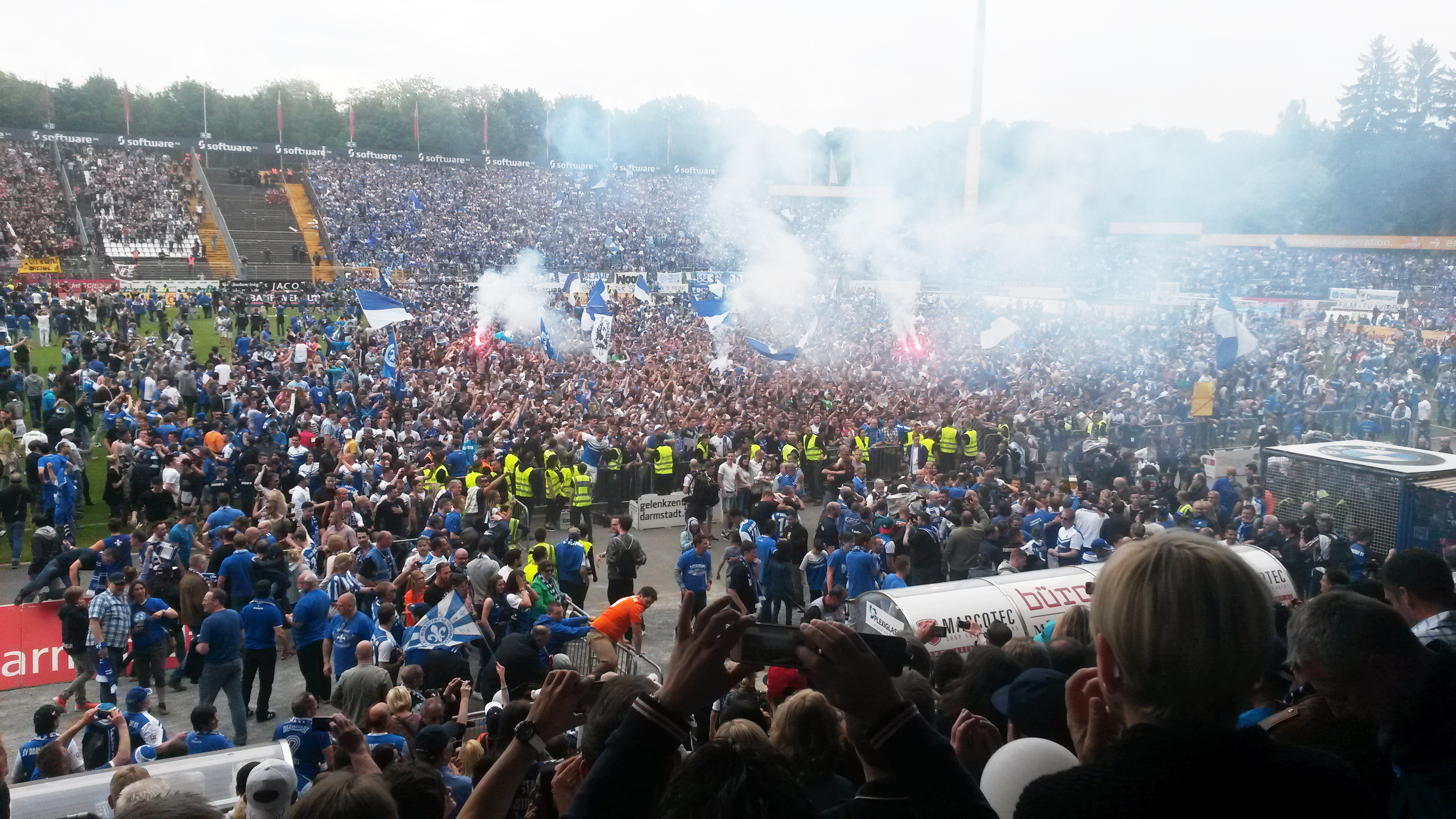
SV Darmstadt 98 fans celebrated promotion to the German Bundesliga in 2015.

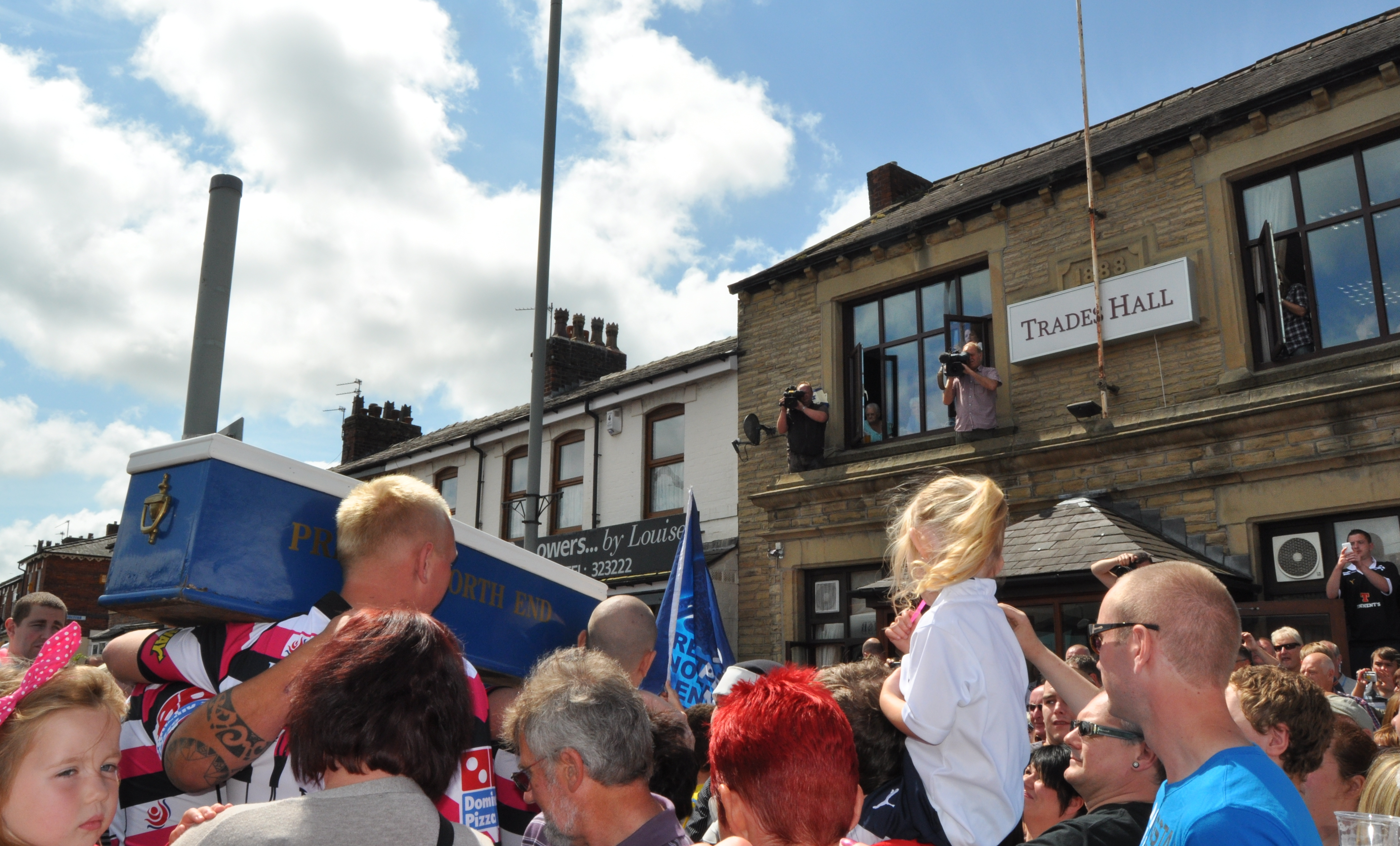
... while Preston North End fans mourned relegation to English League One in 2011.

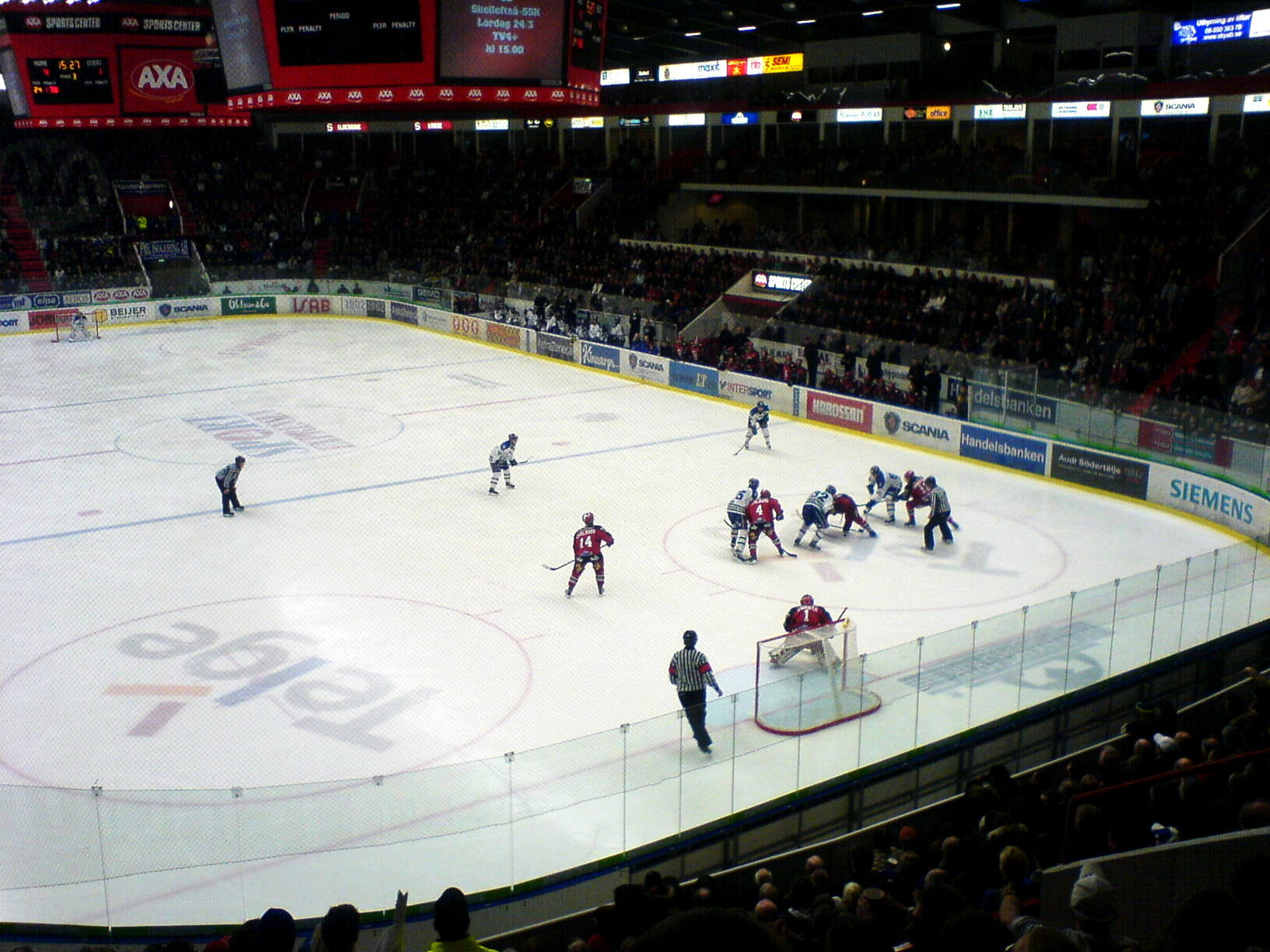
Södertälje SK-Leksands IF during a 2007 Kvalserien game

The number of teams exchanged between the divisions is almost always identical. Exceptions occur when the higher division wishes to change the size of its membership, or has lost one or more of clubs (to financial insolvency or expulsion, for example) and wishes to restore its previous membership size, in which case fewer teams are relegated from that division, or (less often) more teams are accepted for promotion from the division below. Such variations usually cause a "knock-on" effect through the lower divisions. For example, in 1995 the Premier League voted to reduce its numbers by two and achieved the desired change by relegating four teams instead of the usual three, whilst allowing only two promotions from Football League Division One. Even in the absence of such extraordinary circumstances, the pyramid-like nature of most European sports league systems can still create knock-on effects at the regional level. For example, in a higher league with a large geographical footprint and multiple feeder leagues each representing smaller geographical regions, should most or all of the relegated teams in the higher division come from one particular region then the number of teams to be promoted or relegated from each of the feeder leagues may have to be adjusted, or one or more teams playing near the boundary between the feeder leagues may have to transfer from one feeder league to another to maintain numerical balance.

The system is said to be the defining characteristic of the "European" form of professional sports league organization. Promotion and relegation have the effect of allowing the maintenance of a hierarchy of leagues and divisions, according to the relative strength of their teams. They also maintain the importance of games played by many low-ranked teams near the end of the season, which may be at risk of relegation. In contrast, the final games of a low-ranked US or Canadian team serve little purpose, and in fact losing may be beneficial to such teams because they offer a better position in the next year's draft.

Although not intrinsic to the system, problems can occur due to the differing monetary payouts and revenue-generating potential that different divisions provide to their clubs. For example, financial hardship has sometimes occurred in leagues where clubs do not reduce their wage bill once relegated. This usually occurs for one of two reasons: first, the club can not move underperforming players on, or second, the club is gambling on being promoted back straight away and is prepared to take a financial loss for one or two seasons to do so. Some leagues (most notably English football's Premier League) offer "parachute payments" to its relegated teams for the following year(s). The payouts are higher than the prize money received by some non-relegated teams and are designed to soften the financial hit that clubs take whilst dropping out of the Premier League. However, in many cases, these parachute payments just serve to inflate the costs of competing for promotion among the lower division clubs as newly relegated teams retain a financial advantage.

In some countries and at certain levels, teams in line for promotion may have to satisfy certain non-playing conditions in order to be accepted by the higher league, such as financial solvency, stadium capacity, and facilities. If these are not satisfied, a lower-ranked team may be promoted in their place, or a team in the league above may be saved from relegation.

While the primary purpose of the promotion and relegation system is to maintain competitive balance, it may also be used as a disciplinary tool in special cases. On several occasions, the Italian Football Federation has relegated clubs found to have been involved in match fixing. This occurred most recently in 2006, when the season's initial champions Juventus were relegated to Serie B, and two other teams were initially relegated but then restored to Serie A after appeal (see 2006 Serie A scandal).

As of the 2020s, empirical evidence increasingly pointed to the conclusion that promotion and relegation, standing alone, was insufficient to ensure adequate parity in any given game or the overall financial performance of a sport (as distinguished from individual players or teams). Most importantly, the failure of most association football leagues to adequately regulate individual player compensation (that is, by imposing salary caps) had resulted in too many games ending in predictable blowouts, and thereby reduced the financial value of such games in terms of ticket sales and media rights. This explained why in the 2020s, association football leagues were collectively bringing in annually only about two times the revenue of the National Football League (the wealthiest sports league in the world), even though association football had eight times the number of fans worldwide as American football. It was reportedly because of such evidence that the EuroLeague adopted mandatory salary bands in September 2024.

=== International sport ===
Promotion and relegation is used in international sports leagues such as in Europe, and many other parts of the world. It may be used in international sports tournaments. In tennis, the Davis Cup and Billie Jean King Cup have promotion and relegation, with a 'World Group' (split into two divisions in the Billie Jean King Cup) at the top and series of regional groups at a lower level. The World Groups in both use a knockout tournament format, with the first-round losers entering play-offs with winners from regional groups to avoid relegation. In international tournaments, this format allows teams from countries in which a sport is less well established to have competitive matches, while opening up the possibility of competing against higher ranked nations as a sport grows. Other international tournaments which employ promotion and relegation include the Ice Hockey World Championships, Bandy World Championships, Floorball World Championships, the UEFA Nations League, the CONCACAF Nations League, the World Cricket League and the European Team Championships in athletics.

== Historical comparisons ==
=== Early baseball leagues in the United States ===
In baseball, the earliest American sport to develop professional leagues, the National Association of Base Ball Players (NABBP) was established in 1857 as a national governing body for the game. In many respects, it would resemble England's Football Association when founded in 1863. Both espoused strict amateurism in their early years and welcomed hundreds of clubs as members.

Baseball's National Association was not able to survive the onset of professionalism. It responded to the trend – clubs secretly paying or indirectly compensating players – by establishing a "professional" class for 1869. As quickly as 1871, most of those clubs broke away and formed the National Association of Professional Base Ball Players (NAPBBP). (Note: Both were associations of clubs despite their names.) That new, professional Association was open at a modest fee, but it proved to be unstable. It was replaced by the National League of Professional Base Ball Clubs in 1876, which has endured to the present day. The founders of the new League judged that in order to prosper, they must make baseball's highest level of competition a franchise based system with exclusive membership, a strict limit on the number of teams, and each member having exclusive rights to their local market. (Note: At least one economically and competitively viable incumbent was excluded, the second of three 1875 clubs in Philadelphia.)

The modest National League guarantee of a place in the league year after year would permit the owners to monopolize fan bases in their exclusive territories and give them the confidence to invest in infrastructure, such as improved ballparks. In turn, those would guarantee the revenues to support traveling halfway across a continent for games. (Note: For comparison, the distance between Boston and St. Louis, the longest road trip in Major League Baseball before 1953, is similar to that between Madrid and Frankfurt, or Rome and Amsterdam.) Indeed, after its first season, the new league banked on its still doubtful stability by expelling its members in New York and Philadelphia (the two largest cities), because they had breached agreements to visit the four western clubs at the end of the season.

The NL's dominance of baseball was challenged several times after its first few years, but only by entire leagues. Eight clubs, the established norm for a national league, was a prohibitively high threshold for a new venture. Two challengers succeeded beyond the short-term, with the National League fighting off a challenge from the American Association after a decade (concluded 1891). In 1903 it accepted parity with the American League and the formation of the organization that would become Major League Baseball. The peace agreement between the NL and the AL did not change the "closed shop" of top-level baseball but entrenched it by including the AL in the shop. This was further confirmed by the Supreme Court's 1922 ruling in Federal Baseball Club v. National League, giving MLB a legal monopoly over professional baseball in the US.

The other major professional sports leagues in the United States and Canada have followed the MLB model of a franchise based system.

=== Early football leagues in England ===
In contrast to baseball's NABBP, the first governing body in English football survived the onset of professionalism, which it formally accepted in 1885. Perhaps the great geographical concentration of population (Note: To emphasize this point, compare England with Texas. Today, England's population is twice that of Texas, with slightly less than one-fifth of Texas' land area.) and the corresponding short distances between urban centres was crucial. Certainly it provided the opportunity for more clubs' developing large fan bases without incurring great travel costs. Professional football did not gain acceptance until after the turn of the 20th century in most of Southern England. The earliest league members travelled only through the Midlands and North. (Note: The modern regions that encompass the Midlands and North—the East Midlands, West Midlands, North East England, North West England, and Yorkshire and the Humber—have a combined land area slightly larger than that of West Virginia, Latvia, or Lithuania.)

When The Football League (now the English Football League) was founded in 1888, it was not intended to be a rival of The Football Association but rather the top competition within it. The new league was not universally accepted as England's top-calibre competition right away. To help win fans of clubs outside The Football League, its circuit was not closed; rather, a system was established in which the worst teams at the end of each season would need to win re-election against any clubs wishing to join.

A rival league, the Football Alliance, was formed in 1889. When the two merged in 1892, it was not on equal terms; rather, most of the Alliance clubs were put in the new Football League Second Division, whose best teams would move up to the First Division in place of its worst teams. Another merger, with the top division of the Southern League in 1920, helped form the Third Division in similar fashion. Since then no new league has been formed of non-league clubs to try to achieve parity with The Football League (only to play at a lower level, like independent professional leagues in American baseball today).

For decades, teams finishing near the bottom of The Football League's lowest division(s) faced re-election rather than automatic relegation. But the principle of promotion and relegation had been firmly established, and it eventually expanded to the football pyramid in place today. Meanwhile, The FA has remained English football's overall governing body, retaining amateur and professional clubs rather than breaking up.

== Use in other competitions ==
Promotion and relegation has been used in several eSports leagues. Blizzard Entertainment's video game StarCraft II has a "ladder" that uses a promotion and relegation system, where individual players and pre-made teams can be promoted and relegated during the first few weeks of a league season, which generally lasts around 11 weeks, with promotion and relegation taking place based on a skill rating, which is in turn based on wins and losses. However, this form of matchmaking is not typically used for StarCraft II e-sports tournaments, which have various kinds of structures depending on the organizer, the most important being the ESL Pro Tour as of 2021.

Most professional League of Legends leagues like the League of Legends Championship Series and League of Legends Champions Korea used a promotion and relegation system during the early years. The LCS moved away from this in 2018 for North America, while the European LCS (which was renamed to the League of Legends European Championship) entered franchising in 2019 with the LCK following suit in 2020. As of 2026, the LCS and Campeonato Brasileiro de League of Legends (who were merged into the League of Legends Championship of The Americas in 2025 only), as well as the League of Legends Championship Pacific, are the only top-tier professional League of Legends leagues to have promotion and relegation, albeit in a mixed model with only guest teams eligible for relegation; the various regional leagues in Europe have promotion and relegation but not with the LEC. The Valorant Champions Tour utilizes the same mixed model as the LCS, CBLOL and LCP, with 10 of the 12 teams in each of the four VCT regional leagues (Americas, EMEA, Asia-Pacific and China) being partners that can't be relegated. The remaining two teams in each league can requalify for the following year via qualifying for Champions or via the Ascension promotion tournament (which connects the VCT with the second-tier Challengers leagues in each region), or they can be directly relegated if they perform within the bottom third of their league for the year.

The Counter-Strike Majors used a similar system where in the top eight finishers of one of the bi-annual Majors were designated with the "Legends" seed and automatically qualified for the next Major tournament. The best six eliminated teams in the second stage (known as New Legends Stage) of the Major would play a "qualifying" stage (known as New Challengers Stage) with another ten teams from the Minors qualifying tournaments in order to compete at the New Legends Stage. Starting in 2020, however, this was changed to a Regional Major Ranking system, at first a points-based system which was used for ESL One Rio 2020 and PGL Stockholm 2021 (the top rankings from the ESL One Rio 2020 RMRs were turned into PGL Stockholm 2021 points once IEM Rio was cancelled due to the COVID-19 pandemic), then a series of offline qualifiers starting with PGL Antwerp 2022, in which the teams from the Legends Stage (later known as the Elimination Stage) from the previous Major automatically qualify for their RMRs and were joined by online qualifiers, to eventually a pure invite-only system where teams qualified for the Major via Valve's own ranking system, the Valve Regional Standings (VRS).

From 1993 until 2003, the Eurovision Song Contest used various systems of relegation to reconcile the number of countries wishing to participate (approximately 30 at the time) with the number of performances allowed considering time constraints of a live television program. The addition of a semi-final in 2004 allowed for more than 26 songs, but in 2008 automatic qualification of the previous year's top 10 to the final was removed.

In Brazilian carnival's samba school contest, a similar system is adopted, with the schools from lower divisions, or "groups", able to be promoted into the highest tier, being currently called the "Special Group" (Grupo Especial). Schools parade in order of groups and ranking from last year contest, with the better ranked inside a group and the higher-tier groups having the privilege of going latter (this means the team has the opportunity of fixing issues with costumes and allegorical floats as well as more rehearsal time). The number of promoted and relegated schools, four until 1997, has been diminishing as time passes, becoming two from 1998 to 2007 and being only one nowadays. There has never been an official reason for that, but it is a fact that the relegated schools have more to lose nowadays, such as access to the Cidade do Samba ("Samba City") facilities. There have been reported several interferences on the contest's final result, especially when traditional schools are involved.

== Argentinian football and the average performance system ==
From 1957 to 1966 and from 1983 to the present, the Argentine First Division has used a system called Promedios based on the average performance over a number of seasons. Originally the previous two seasons, and later three or four seasons, clubs avoid relegation by having a high coefficient, which is obtained by dividing the points achieved in the last three seasons by the number of matches played in the same period. Teams with the lowest points coefficient at the end of the season are relegated to the Primera B Nacional.

This system has both positive and negative aspects, since all of the matches played for the championship in the last seasons are included in the coefficient for the clubs. Teams have an incentive to score points in every match of the season, meaning teams that are not challenging for the title or fighting relegation in the current season want to win even in the final matches to reduce the risk of relegation in the next season; examples are Club Atlético Banfield being champion of the Torneo Apertura in 2009 and last place in the next championship, the Torneo Clausura 2010, without being relegated until the end of the Torneo Apertura 2010 with a second-to-last place finish.

Similarly, River Plate finished last in the Torneo Apertura 2008 and after two bad campaigns and a mediocre one was relegated in the Torneo Clausura 2011 despite being in fifth place and qualifying for the 2011 Copa Sudamericana. This system forces the newly promoted teams to fight relegation from the very beginning of the season. It also allows teams with a low budget with previous good campaigns to compete in international competitions without having to prioritize the championship to avoid relegation; examples of this are Club Atlético Lanús, winner of the 2013 Copa Sudamericana, or Club Atlético Talleres, winner of the 1999 Conmebol Cup. Critics argue that the system can be unfair, especially to newly promoted teams that have fewer matches and thus more volatile averages and may favour traditionally larger clubs and it protects the biggest clubs. Claudio Tapia said in 2019 that the system would be phased out within three years. he claims that it was introduced to protect big clubs and its unfair and biased. The Uruguayan First Division adopted the same system in 2016. Paraguayan Primera División and Colombian Categoría Primera A also use this same system.

Also, a similar system was used only in the 1999 edition of Campeonato Brasileiro Série A.

== See also ==
- List of association football clubs with multiple consecutive promotions or relegations
- List of association football leagues without promotion and relegation
- List of unrelegated association football clubs
- Yo-yo club – Sporting side that is regularly promoted and relegated
