= 2025 Marianas Soccer League 1 =

Marianas Soccer League 1
- Season: 2025
- Champions: Spring: Kanoa
- Matches: 23
- Goals: 148 (6.43 per match)
- Top goalscorer: Spring: Paul Lizama (12 goals)
- Biggest home win: Spring: MP United 14–0 Men's Development Team 2
- Biggest away win: Spring: Men's Development Team 2 0–13 Kanoa
- Highest scoring: Spring: MP United 14–0 Men's Development Team 2

The 2025 Marianas Soccer League 1 is the 5th season of the Marianas Soccer League 1 and the 20th season overall of top-flight domestic football in Northern Mariana Islands.

== Teams ==
Five teams competed in the league, two of which being development teams employed by the Northern Mariana Islands Football Association.

Location of clubs that competed in the 2025 season

== Spring League ==
=== Regular season ===
Pos	Team	Pld	W	D	L	GF	GA	GD	Pts	Qualification
1	Kanoa (Q)	8	8	0	0	42	3	+39	24	Qualification to Spring Playoffs
2	Matansa	8	6	0	2	33	11	+22	18	Qualification to Spring Playoffs
3	MP United	8	4	0	4	34	21	+13	12	Qualification to Spring Playoffs
4	Marianas Development Team 1	8	1	1	6	6	28	−22	4	Qualification to Spring Playins
5	Marianas Development Team 2	8	0	1	7	3	55	−52	1	Qualification to Spring Playins

Source: NMIFA powerupsports
(Q) Qualified for the phase indicated

=== Results ===
Home \ Away	KAN	MAT	MPU	MDO	MDT
Kanoa	—	4–1	3–0	5–1	5–0
Matansa	1–3	—	7–0	6–1	5–0
MP United	0–5	3–5	—	2–1	14–0
Marianas Development Team 1	0–4	0–5	0–5	—	1–1
Marianas Development Team 1	0–13	0–5	2–10	0–2	—

Source: NMIFA MSL1 Regular Season Results
Legend: Blue = home team win; Yellow = draw; Red = away team win.

=== Playoffs ===
The new season format saw the bottom 2 teams play a play-in match to determine who qualifies for the semi-final while the top three teams gets automatic qualification to the semi-final.

The winner of the play-in match gets the fourth seed in the semi finals. The playoffs started on 4 May 2025.

Play-in
4	Marianas Development Team 1	5
5	Marianas Development Team 2	1

Semi-finals
1	Kanoa	8
4	Marianas Development Team 1	0
2	Matansa	1
3	MP United	4

Finals
Kanoa	4
MP United	0
Third-place playoff
Marianas Development Team 1	1
Matansa	6

==== Play-in ====
4 May 2025
19:05

Marianas Development Team 1	5–1	Marianas Development Team 2

Northern Mariana Islands Training Center, Saipan

==== Semi-finals ====
7 May 2025
18:15

Matansa	1–4	MP United

Northern Mariana Islands Training Center, Saipan
14 May 2025
18:30

Kanoa	8–0	Marianas Development Team 1

Northern Mariana Islands Training Center, Saipan

==== Third-place playoff ====
18 May 2025
19:00

Marianas Development Team 1	1–6	Matansa

Northern Mariana Islands Training Center, Saipan

==== Finals ====
18 May 2025
19:00

Kanoa	4–0	MP United

Northern Mariana Islands Training Center, Saipan

== Season statistics ==
=== Top goalscorers ===
As of 14 May 2025

Rank	Player	Team	Goals
1	(Northern Mariana Islands) Paul Lizama	Kanoa	12
2	(Northern Mariana Islands) Sunjoon Tenorio	Matansa	10
3	(Northern Mariana Islands) Tyler Wess Omelau	Kanoa	8
4	(Northern Mariana Islands) Wataru Kadokura	MP United	7
5	(Northern Mariana Islands) Chanseo Yeom	MP United	6
5	(Northern Mariana Islands) Takeru Jim	MP United	6
7	(Northern Mariana Islands) Dev Bachani	MP United	5
8	(Northern Mariana Islands) Joe Wang Miller	Matansa	4
8	(Northern Mariana Islands) Akira Kadokura	Matansa	4
8	(Northern Mariana Islands) Brian Lubao	Kanoa	4

=== Own Goals ===
As of 12 March 2025

Rank	Player	Team	Own goals
1	(Northern Mariana Islands) Travis Jr. Kileleman Hix	Marianas Development Team 2	1

=== Hat-tricks ===
As of 7 May 2025

Player	For	Against	Result	Date
(Northern Mariana Islands) Dev Bachani	MP United	Marianas Development Team 1	5–0 (A)	26 February 2025
(Northern Mariana Islands) Chanseo Yeom	MP United	Marianas Development Team 2	10–2 (A)	9 April 2025
(Northern Mariana Islands) Wataru Kadokura^{4}	MP United	Marianas Development Team 2	10–2 (A)	9 April 2025
(Northern Mariana Islands) Takeru Jim	MP United	Matansa	4–1 (A)	7 May 2025

^{4} Player scored 4 goals.
