= Marianas Soccer League 1 =

Association football league in the Northern Mariana Islands

- Founded: 2005; 21 years ago
- First season: 2006–07
- Country: Northern Mariana Islands
- Confederation: AFC
- Number of clubs: 5
- Level on pyramid: 1
- International cup(s): AFC Challenge League; Marianas Club Championship
- Current champions: Spring: Kanoa (2nd title) (2025)
- Most championships: Inter Godfather's (7 titles)
- Top scorer: Joe Wang Miller (79 goals)
- Broadcaster: FIFA+ (live streaming)
- Website: www.nmifa.com
- Current: 2025 Marianas Soccer League 1

The Marianas Soccer League 1 is the men's top level professional football competition of the Northern Mariana Islands Football Association. It is above the Marianas Soccer League 2, but there is no regular promotion/relegation between the two competitions.

The league has a special rule in place called the "skunk rule", which states that once a team is leading a match by 5 goals, the match continues but the score stops being recorded.

== History ==
The league began as an invitational event in the Northern Mariana Islands. The league has been operating since 2005 and grew to include eight teams in the 2008 season.

On 2 August 2012 the competition was re-branded as the M-League, following the suit of many other AFC national competitions. In September 2012, the Northern Mariana Islands Football Association (NMIFA) officially launched a two tier completion, usually without promotion and relegation. In the inaugural season there were 5 teams in Division 1 and 4 teams in generally amateur Division 2.

After the 2020 season was abandoned due to the COVID-19 pandemic, the league was relaunched in Spring 2021 as the Marianas Soccer League.

== Marianas Club Championship ==
Since 2023, the winners of the Marianas Soccer League 1 and the Guam Soccer League compete against each other in the Marianas Club Championship.

== Previous winners ==
Winners so far are:

=== Northern Mariana Invitational Championship ===
- 2005: not held
- 2006–07: L&S/Kyung-Seung
- 2007: Fiesta Inter Saipan
- 2008 Spring: Inter Godfather's
- 2008 Fall: Inter Godfather's
- 2009: Inter Godfather's
- 2010: MP United
- 2011: Inter Godfather's

=== M-League Division 1 ===
- 2012 Spring: Wild Bills
- 2012 Fall: Tan Holdings
- 2013 Spring: Wild Bills
- 2013–14: Wild Bills
- 2014 Fall: MP United
- 2015 Spring: Tan Holdings
- 2015 Fall: not held
- 2016 Spring: Tan Holdings
- 2016 Fall: MP United
- 2017 Spring: MP United
- 2017 Fall: Tan Holdings
- 2018 Spring: MP United
- 2018 Fall: abandoned
- 2019 Spring: Teen Ayuyu
- 2019 Fall: All Blue
- 2020 Spring: abandoned
- 2020 Fall: not held

=== Marianas Soccer League ===
- 2021 Spring: Tan Holdings
- 2021 Fall: All Blue
- 2022 Spring: Eleven Tiger
- 2022 Fall: Tan Holdings
- 2023 Spring: Eleven Tiger
- 2023 Fall: Eleven Tiger
- 2024 Spring: Kanoa
- 2024 Fall: Matansa
- 2025 Spring: Kanoa
- 2025 Fall: Kanoa

== Individual statistics ==
=== Top goalscorers ===
Year	Top scorer	Team	Goals
2007	(Japan) Masatoshi Otsuka	Inter Saipan	
2009	(Northern Mariana Islands) Joe Wang Miller	MP United	23
2010	(Northern Mariana Islands) Joe Wang Miller	MP United	15
2016	(Czech Republic) Martin Jambor	Tan Holdings	14
2018	(Northern Mariana Islands) Sunjoon Tenorio	MP United	15
2020 Spring	(Northern Mariana Islands) Andrw Omelau		8
2024 Spring	(Northern Mariana Islands) Markus Toves	Kanoa	13
2024 Fall	(Northern Mariana Islands) Tanapon Unsa	Matansa	11
2025 Spring	(Northern Mariana Islands) Paul Lizama	Kanoa	14

Most time goalscorers

- 2 times.
  - Joe Wang Miller (2009 and 2010).

Most goals by a player in single season

- 23 goals.
  - Joe Wang Miller (2009).

=== Hat-tricks multiple ===
Rank	Country	Player	Hat-tricks
1	(Northern Mariana Islands)	Sunjoon Tenorio	1

== Women's League ==
=== Top goalscorers ===
Season	Player	Team	Goals
2006	(Northern Mariana Islands) Sarah Helbert	Eye Yeye	12
2016 Fall	(Northern Mariana Islands) Guinevere Borja	Paire	18
2016 Fall	(Northern Mariana Islands) Therize Millare	Shirley	18
2019 Spring	(Northern Mariana Islands) Katrina Costales	Shirley	11
2022 Fall	(Northern Mariana Islands) Jannah Casarino		23
2023 Spring	(Northern Mariana Islands) Jannah Casarino		14
2024 Spring	(Northern Mariana Islands) Jannah Casarino	Shirley	16
2025 Spring	(Northern Mariana Islands) Jannah Casarino	Paire	9
2025 Spring	(Northern Mariana Islands) Lalaine Pagarao	Kanoa	9
