= 2006–07 Northern Mariana Championship =

M*League Division 1
- Season: 2006
- Champions: L&S/Kyung-Seung
- Matches played: 24
- Goals scored: 88 (3.67 per match)
- Biggest home win: PTI Guardians 3–0 Independents
- Biggest away win: Alliance 0–9 Fiesta Inter Saipan
- Highest scoring: Real Mariana 4–6 L&S/Kyung-Seung
- Longest winning run: L&S/Kyung-Seung; Real Mariana – 3 matches
- Longest unbeaten run: Fiesta Inter Saipan – 6 matches
- Longest losing run: Independents – 5 matches

The 2006–07 Northern Mariana Championship was the inaugural season of top flight football competition in Northern Marianas Islands. A competition with four confirmed participants (their names are not recorded in available sources) was planned to start in November 2005, but was ultimately cancelled. The competition was won by L&S/Kyung-Seung from Sadog Tasi with Fiesta Inter Saipan from Garapan finishing as runners up and Real Mariana in third place.

== League table ==
The league was played on a round robin basis with all teams playing each other once. The league table below is final, Onwell Manufacturing from Susupe (also known as Thai Squad) were added to the league over the Christmas period between rounds two and three. The final games were not played.

Pos	Team	Pld	W	D	L	GF	GA	GD	Pts
1	L&S/Kyung-Seung (C)	6	5	0	1	18	9	+9	15
2	Fiesta Inter Saipan	6	4	2	0	19	5	+14	14
3	Real Mariana	5	3	1	1	15	9	+6	10
4	Korean One	6	3	0	3	10	14	−4	9
5	Onwell Manufacturing	4	2	1	1	10	6	+4	7
6	PTI Guardians	6	2	0	4	8	11	−3	6
7	Alliance	6	1	0	5	5	21	−16	3
8	Independents	5	0	0	5	3	13	−10	0

Rules for classification: 1) points; 2) goal difference; 3) number of goals scored.
(C) Champions

== Results ==
Home \ Away	ALL	FIS	IND	KOR	L&S	ONW	PTI	REA
Alliance		0–9			0–4	1–2		
Fiesta Inter Saipan				3–1	3–1		3–2	
Independents	1–2			1–2				1–4
Korean One	3–1					1–5		1–4
L&S/Kyung-Seung			2–0				2–0	
Onwell Manufacturing		1–1			2–3			
PTI Guardians	2–1		3–0	0–2				
Real Mariana		0–0			4–6		3–1	

Legend: Blue = home team win; Yellow = draw; Red = away team win.
