= 2007 Northern Mariana Championship =

M*League Division 1
- Season: 2007
- Champions: Fiesta Inter Saipan
- Relegated: None
- Matches played: 14
- Goals scored: 69 (4.93 per match)
- Biggest home win: Wild Bill's 8–0 Pacific Telecom
- Biggest away win: Bangladesh SC 1–6 Fiesta Inter Saipan
- Highest scoring: Fiesta Inter Saipan 8–2 Pacific Telecom
- Longest winning run: Fiesta Inter Saipan – 6 matches
- Longest unbeaten run: Fiesta Inter Saipan – 6 matches
- Longest losing run: Pacific Telecom – 4 matches

The 2007 Northern Mariana Championship was the second season of top-flight football in Northern Marianas Islands and the first to include a play-off phase. The competition was won by Fiesta Inter Saipan who defeated FC Arirang 3–1 in the final.

== Final Table ==
Pos	Team	Pld	W	D	L	GF	GA	GD	Pts	Qualification
1	Fiesta Inter Saipan (Q)	4	4	0	0	20	4	+16	12	Semi-finals
2	FC Arirang (Note: FC Arirang were known as Korean FA for the first round of matches before changing their name.) (Q)	4	3	0	1	10	6	+4	9	Semi-finals
3	Wild Bill's (Note: Wild Bill's were known as Independents until the second round of matches and had competed in the previous season.) (Q)	4	1	1	2	12	10	+2	4	Semi-finals
4	Bangladeshi SC (Q)	4	1	1	2	8	12	−4	4	Semi-finals
5	Pacific Telecom (Note: Pacific Telecom competed in the previous season as PTI Guardians.)	4	0	0	4	5	23	−18	0	

Rules for classification: 1) points; 2) goal difference; 3) number of goals scored.
(Q) Qualified for the phase indicated

== Results ==
The season was played in two stages, first a round robin group where all five teams played each other once. the top four teams them progressed to a one-legged semi-final to determine the two teams that would play for the championship.

=== Group stage ===
Home \ Away	BSC	FCA	FIS	PAC	WIL
Bangladeshi SC			1–6		3–3
FC Arirang	2–0		1–3	4–1	
Fiesta Inter Saipan				8–2	3–0
Pacific Telecom	1–4				
Wild Bill's		2–3		7–1	

Updated to match(es) played on 8 September 2007. Source:
Legend: Blue = home team win; Yellow = draw; Red = away team win.

=== Semifinals ===
9 September 2007?

Fiesta Inter Saipan	6–1	Bangladeshi SC

9 September 2007?

FC Arirang	beat	Wild Bill's

=== Third place play-off ===
16 September 2007?

Wild Bill's	2–1	Bangladeshi SC

=== Final ===
16 September 2007

Fiesta Inter	3–1	FC Arirang
