= 2008 Northern Mariana Championship =

M*League Division 1
- Season: 2008
- Champions: Spring: Fiesta Inter Saipan; Fall:Fiesta Inter Saipan
- Relegated: None
- Biggest home win: FC Arirang 12–0 Ol' Aces
- Biggest away win: Ol' Aces 2–11 FC Arirang
- Highest scoring: Ol' Aces 2–11 FC Arirang; Ol' Aces 2–11 Fiesta Inter Saipan

The 2008 Northern Mariana Championship was the third season of top-flight football in Northern Marianas Islands. The league was divided into two parts, the Winter League and the Fall League. The Winter League was won by Fiesta Inter Saipan, who also won the Fall League under their new name, Inter Godfather's.

== Winter League ==
The winter league was played in a normal league format, each team played the others twice and the team in first place following the completion of all games won the championship.

=== Final standings ===
The precise results for the final two rounds of the league are not known, however, the top three places are known for certain:

Pos	Team	Pld	W	D	L	GF	GA	GD	Pts
1	Fiesta Inter Saipan (C)	9	7	1	1	-	-	—	22
2	FC Arirang	9	6	2	1	-	-	—	20
3	Onwell Manufacturing	9	4	3	2	-	-	—	15

Rules for classification: 1) points; 2) goal difference; 3) number of goals scored.
(C) Champions

=== Latest known full table ===
After eight rounds, the last point at which a full table is available, the league standings were:

Pos	Team	Pld	W	D	L	GF	GA	GD	Pts	FCA	FIS	ONW	IND	MUL	OLA
1	FC Arirang	7	5	1	1	40	13	+27	16			2–2	4–1	4–3	12–0
2	Fiesta Inter Saipan	7	5	1	1	32	11	+21	16	3–6		3–0	2–2		
3	Onwell Manufacturing	7	3	2	2	29	16	+13	11		2–4			4–1	10–0
4	Independents	7	3	1	3	16	17	−1	10	2–1	2–2			1–3	
5	Multinational FC	7	2	1	4	24	25	−1	7		0–4	5–5	3–7		9–0
6	Ol' Aces	7	0	0	7	4	63	−59	0	2–11	1–12	1–6	0–3		

Updated to match(es) played on 23 March 2008. Source:
Rules for classification: 1) points; 2) goal difference; 3) number of goals scored.

The scores for rounds five and nine are not known, although it is known that Inter Saipan, FC Arirang and Onwell beat Ol' Aces, Multinational and Independents respectively in round five and that Inter Saipan beat Multinational while Onwell drew with FC Aririang in round six. The result of the match between Independents and Ol' Aces in round nine is not known while none of the results in round ten are known.

== Fall League ==
The Fall League consisted of a reduced number of teams, with only Inter Saipan (competing under their new name of Inter Godfather's) and Multinational FC from the Spring League choosing to compete. Wild Bill's and Pacific Telecom, who competed in the previous season also competed, with Pacific Telecom competing under the name MP United - PTI. A group stage was held to confirm who would play whom in the semi-finals.

=== Group stage ===
The results of the group stage are not known, it is also not known whether teams played each other once or twice.

Pos	Team	Pld	W	D	L	GF	GA	GD	Pts	Qualification
1	Inter Godfather's (Q)	0	0	0	0	0	0	0	0	Semi-finals
2	Wild Bill's	0	0	0	0	0	0	0	0	Semi-finals
3	MP United - PTI (Q)	0	0	0	0	0	0	0	0	Semi-finals
4	Multinational FC (Q)	0	0	0	0	0	0	0	0	Semi-finals

Updated to match(es) played on unknown. Source:
(Q) Qualified for the phase indicated

=== Semi finals ===
Inter Godfathers	1-0	Multinational FC
Unknown	Source

Wild Bill's	1-2	MP United - PTI
Unknown	Source	Unknown

=== Third-place match ===
Wild Bill's	2-0	Multinational FC
Unknown	Source

=== Final ===
23 November 2008?

Inter Godfather's	1-1	MP United - PTI
Unknown	Source	Unknown
Penalties
Unknown	5-4	Unknown
