= Bandy World Championship (disambiguation) =

Bandy World Championship may refer to:

- Bandy World Championship
- Women's Bandy World Championship
- Youth Bandy World Championship
