= Kanoa FC =

Northern Mariana Islands soccer club

Kanoa
- Full name: Kanoa Football Club
- Founded: 2012; 14 years ago
- Ground: NMI Soccer Training Center
- Capacity: 500
- Chairman: Merlie Tolentino
- League: MSL 1
- 2024: Champions

Kanoa FC is a professional association football club from the Northern Mariana Islands, currently competing in the Marianas Soccer League 1. The club also fields women and youth sides.

== History ==
Kanoa FC was founded in 2012. The club's senior men's side has participated in the Marianas Soccer League 1 since the 2013 fall season.

In the 2022 Fall season, the club saw its first top 3 finish in their history and improving from there. They have finished 3rd again in the 2023 Spring season, and finished as runners-up in the following Fall season.

=== 2024: First title and rise to dominance ===
The 2024 Spring season saw the club sweeping the regular season table with no losses and qualifying for the playoffs. The club faced Paire FC in the semi-finals and won 5–0, qualifying for their first Marianas Soccer League final and facing Matansa FC. The final saw a score of 4–2 in favor of Kanoa courtesy of goals from Tyler Omelau and Markus Toves and two own goals from Matansa's backline, sealing Kanoa's first ever Marianas Soccer League 1 title.

The club continued with their consistent form as they've managed to place second in the 2024 Fall season table with only two defeats, and qualifying for the playoffs where they faced MP United in the semi-finals and winning 2–3 securing another finals spot and going up against Matansa once again. The club saw two goals from Brian Lubao and Daniell Pablo, although it was not enough. As Matansa would later on win with a scoreline of 3–2 in the finals.

== Honours ==
- Marianas Soccer League 1
  - Winners: 2024 Spring, 2025 Spring
  - Runners-up: 2023 Fall, 2024 Fall
