= 2009 Northern Mariana Championship =

Northern Mariana Championship
- Season: 2009

The 2009 Northern Mariana Championship was the fourth season of top-flight football in Northern Marianas Islands. The competition was won by Inter Godfather's, previously known as Fiesta Inter Saipan.

== Final table ==
Unlike previous seasons where playoffs had been employed, this season was a normal league format in which each team played the others twice. Remington were new entrants to the league and FC Arirang were renamed Korean FA.

Pos	Team	Pld	W	D	L	GF	GA	GD	Pts	GOD	MPU	IND	KFA	KFJ	REM	MAN
1	Inter Godfather's (C)	12	7	2	3	33	16	+17	23		1–4	4–0	1–0	3–1	3–3	2–0
2	Marianas Pacific United	12	6	1	5	43	31	+12	19	1–4		7–0	7–2	1–2	2–6	3–3
3	Independents	12	6	1	5	27	33	−6	19	2–1	0–1		4–3	2–5	3–3	5–3
4	Korean FA	12	6	0	6	36	41	−5	18	1–0	4–3	2–4		3–11	7–1	3–2
5	Korean FA Juniors	12	5	1	6	33	30	+3	16	3–3	0–3	2–5	3–2		2–4	0–3
6	Remington	12	4	2	6	33	48	−15	14	1–7	2–7	2–1	4–5	0–4		7–2
7	Matansa	12	4	1	7	27	33	−6	13	0–4	7–4	0–1	1–4	1–0	5–0	

Rules for classification: 1) points; 2) goal difference; 3) number of goals scored.
(C) Champions

== Top scorers ==
Position	Name	Team	Goals
1	Joe Miller	Marianas Pacific United	23
2	Thoengaket Jeeraphong	Remington	22
3	Ko Brian	Korean FA Juniors	13
4	Jari Voutilainen	Independents	12
5	Jason Schroeder	Independents	10
