= Inter Godfather's =

- Founded: 2005
- League: M*League Division 1

The Inter Godfather's, previously known as Fiesta Inter Saipan, was a M*League Division 1 football club based in Garapan on the island of Saipan, which is a part of the United States Commonwealth of the Northern Mariana Islands (CNMI). The club has won five titles in the Northern Mariana Championships between 2007 and 2011.

== Honors ==
Honors won by Inter Godfather's
Honor	No.	Years
M*League Division 1	5	2007, 2008 (Spring), 2008 (Fall), 2009, 2011
