= Paire FC =

- Full name: Paire Football Club
- Founded: 2008
- Stadium: Oleai Sports Complex
- Capacity: 2000
- Manager: Coach Steve, Coach Joey (both U17)
- League: M*League Division 1
- Website: http://www.pairefootballclub.org/
Home colors

Paire Football Club is a football club from Saipan in the Northern Mariana Islands. Its men's team competes in the M*League Division 1.

== Logo ==
Paire FC's logo is based on Club Atletico River Plate's logo.

== Teams ==
Made up of age groups adjacent to each other, Paire FC incorporates 12 teams including both genders: Under-6, Under-8, Under-10, Under-12 division B, Under-12 Division A, Under-14 Boys, Under-15 Girls, Under-17 Boys and Men's team.
