= IFC Wild Bills =

- Full name: IFC Wild Bills
Home colors	Away colors	Third colors

IFC Wild Bills were a football club from the Northern Mariana Islands. They have won 3 titles in the M*League.

== Achievements ==
- M*League champions

2012 Spring, 2013 Spring, 2013–14
