= 2013–14 Southern District RSA season =

Royal Southern
2013–14 season
- Chairman: Wong Ling Sun
- Head Coach: Fung Hoi Man
- Home Ground: Aberdeen Sports Ground (Capacity: 4,000)
- First Division: 5th (alphabetically)
- Senior Shield: Semi-finals
- FA Cup: Quarter-finals
- Highest home attendance: 586 (3 November 2013 vs Kitchee, First Division)
- Lowest home attendance: 283 (14 December 2013 vs Yokohama FC Hong Kong, First Division)
- Average home league attendance: 427 (League only)
Home colours	Away colours

The 2013–14 season was Southern District RSA's 12th competitive season and 2nd consecutive season in the Hong Kong First Division League, the top-tier division in Hong Kong football. Southern competed in the First Division League, Senior Challenge Shield and FA Cup in this season.

Starting in this season, the team was renamed Royal Southern for sponsorship reasons.

== Key events ==
- 17 May 2013: Spanish defender Rubén López García-Madrid and fellow forward Dieguito extend their contracts with the club.
- 19 May 2013: The club confirms that they have completed the permanent transfer of Spanish forward Jonathan Carril from Kitchee after Carril spent almost the whole 2012–13 season on loan to the club.
- 29 May 2013: Spanish forward Yago González joins the club from fellow First Division club Kitchee for free.
- 29 May 2013: All local players except Tsang Chiu Tat and Tse Man Wing have extended their contracts with the club. The club also confirmed that Paul Ngue is free to join any club for free as they do not extend Ngue's contract.
- 29 May 2013: The club confirms that Paul Ngue is excluded from the list of foreign players and is free to join any club for free.
- 1 June 2013: Spanish defender Héctor Granado Gómez joins the club from CF Palencia for free. He previously played with Rubén López García-Madrid in the 2011–12 season.
- 8 June 2013: Hong Kong midfielder Cheng Chi Wing leaves the club and joins newly promoted First Division club Happy Valley for an undisclosed fee.
- 8 June 2013: Hong Kong defender To Philip Michael leaves the club and joins newly promoted First Division club Happy Valley for an undisclosed fee.
- 11 June 2013: Hong Kong defender Tse Man Wing leaves the club and joins newly promoted First Division club Eastern Salon for free.
- 17 June 2013: Hong Kong midfielder Ngan Lok Fung joins the club from fellow First Division club Kitchee on a season-long loan.
- 21 June 2013: Chinese-born Hong Kong midfielder Che Runqiu joins the club from newly relegated Second Division club Wofoo Tai Po for free.
- 23 June 2013: Hong Kong midfielder Lo Chi Kwan joins the club from fellow First Division club Kitchee on a season-long loan.
- 8 July 2013: Ghana-born Naturalised Hong Kong defender Wisdom Fofo Agbo leaves the club and joins Chinese League One club Harbin Yiteng on a free transfer.
- 18 July 2013: Hong Kong defender Tsang Chiu Tat leaves the club and joins fellow First Division club Tuen Mun on a free transfer.
- 6 August 2013: Hong Kong goalkeeper Tsang Man Fai joins the club on loan from fellow First Division club South China until the end of the season.
- 7 August 2013: Hong Kong defender Li Ngai Hoi joins the club on loan from fellow First Division club Kitchee until the end of the season.
- 17 January 2014: Hong Kong striker James Ha joins the club on loan from fellow First Division club Kitchee until the end of the season.
- 17 January 2014: Hong Kong defender Pak Wing Chak joins the club on loan from fellow First Division club Eastern Salon until the end of the season.
- 22 January 2014: Hong Kong defender Li Ngai Hoi returns to Kitchee after 4 months loan spell with the club.
- 28 January 2014: Hong Kong defender Tsang Chiu Tat rejoins the club from fellow First Division club Tuen Mun for an undisclosed fee.
- 28 January 2014: Hong Kong goalkeeper Zhang Chunhui joins the club after terminating contract with fellow First Division club South China.
- 4 February 2014: Spanish midfielder José María Díaz Muñoz joins the club from Thai Division 1 League club Roi Et United on a free transfer.

== Players ==
=== Squad information ===
N	P	Nat.	Name	Date of birth	Age	Since	Previous club	Notes
1	GK	(Hong Kong)	Cheng Ting Hei^{LP}	1 July 1991	22	2012	Youth system	
2	DF	(Hong Kong)	Lam Ho Kwan^{LP}	7 April 1987	27	2004	Youth system	
3	DF	(Spain)	Héctor Granado Gómez^{LP}	20 March 1987	27	2013	(Spain) CF Palencia	
5	DF	(Spain)	Rubén López García-Madrid^{FP}	9 July 1979	34	2012	(Spain) CF Palencia	Team captain
7	MF	(Hong Kong)	Chow Ka Wa^{LP}	23 April 1986	28	2011	(Hong Kong) Pontic	
8	FW	(Spain)	Yago González^{FP}	6 November 1979	34	2013	(Hong Kong) Kitchee	
9	FW	(Spain)	Jonathan Carril^{FP}	28 February 1984	30	2013	(Hong Kong) Kitchee	
10	FW	(Spain)	Dieguito^{FP}	6 January 1983	31	2012	(Spain) UE Rapitenca	
11	MF	(Hong Kong)	Lo Chi Kwan^{LP}	18 March 1981	33	2013	(Hong Kong) Kitchee	On loan from Kitchee
12	DF	(Hong Kong)	Pak Wing Chak^{LP}	23 April 1990	24	2014 (Winter)	(Hong Kong) Eastern Salon	On loan from Eastern Salon
13	DF	(Hong Kong)	Ha Shing Chi^{LP}	30 May 1982	32	2010	(Hong Kong) Happy Valley	
14	MF	(Hong Kong)	Tsang Tsz Hin^{LP}	27 October 1995	18	2012	Youth system	
15	MF	(Hong Kong)	Chan Cheuk Kwong^{LP}	5 December 1984	29	2009	(Hong Kong) Five-One-Seven	
16	MF	(Hong Kong)	Ngan Lok Fung^{LP}	26 January 1993	21	2013	(Hong Kong) Kitchee	On loan from Kitchee
17	DF	(Hong Kong)	Li Ngai Hoi^{LP}	15 October 1994	20	2013	(Hong Kong) Kitchee	On loan from Kitchee
18	MF	(Hong Kong)	Chung Hon Chee^{LP}	22 January 1989	25	2009	(Hong Kong) Eastern	
19	GK	(Hong Kong)	Tsang Man Fai^{LP}	2 August 1991	22	2013	Yokohama FC Hong Kong	On loan from South China
20	FW	(Hong Kong)	James Stephen Gee Ha^{LP}	26 December 1992	21	2014 (Winter)	(Hong Kong) Kitchee	Second nationality: England; On loan from Kitchee
21	MF	(Hong Kong)	Kwok Ting Him^{LP}	28 December 1994	20	2009	Youth system	
22	MF	(Hong Kong)	Che Runqiu^{LP}	25 October 1990	23	2013	(Hong Kong) Wofoo Tai Po	Second nationality: China
23	MF	(Spain)	Lander Panera Arteagabeitia^{NR}	4 December 1981	32	2012	(Spain) Alicante CF	
25	GK	(Hong Kong)	Chiu Yu Ming^{LP}	9 November 1991	22	2012	Hong Kong Sapling	
26	DF	(Hong Kong)	Lee Sze Ho^{LP}	15 July 1986	27	2010	(Hong Kong) Shatin	
27	MF	(Hong Kong)	Lo Wai Tat^{LP}	21 September 1985	28	2013	Youth system	
28	DF	(Hong Kong)	Tsang Chiu Tat^{LP}	3 February 1989	25	2014 (Winter)	(Hong Kong) Tuen Mun	
31	MF	(Spain)	José María Díaz Muñoz^{FP}	4 July 1982	31	2014 (Winter)	(Thailand) Roi Et United	
33	MF	(Hong Kong)	Ip Chung Long^{LP}	16 November 1989	24	2012	(Hong Kong) Biu Chun Rangers	
37	GK	(Hong Kong)	Lee Yang Xuan^{LP}	27 October 1995	18	2012	Youth system	
38	GK	(Hong Kong)	Zhang Chunhui^{LP}	13 March 1983	31	2014 (Winter)	(Hong Kong) South China	

Last update: 7 August 2013
Source: Southern District RSA
Ordered by squad number.
^{LP}Local player; ^{FP}Foreign player; ^{NR}Non-registered player

=== Transfers ===
==== In ====
#	Position	Player	Transferred from	Fee	Date	Team	Source
9	FW	(Spain) Jonathan Carril	(Hong Kong) Kitchee	Free transfer	19 May 2013	First team	
8	FW	(Spain) Yago González	(Hong Kong) Kitchee	Free transfer	29 May 2013	First team	
3	DF	(Spain) Héctor Granado Gómez	(Spain) CF Palencia	Free transfer	1 June 2013	First team	
22	MF	(Hong Kong) Che Runqiu	(Hong Kong) Wofoo Tai Po	Free transfer	21 June 2013	First team	
	DF	(Hong Kong) Tsang Chiu Tat	(Hong Kong) Tuen Mun	Undisclosed	28 January 2014	First team	
	GK	(Hong Kong) Zhang Chunhui	(Hong Kong) South China	Free transfer	28 January 2014	First team	
	MF	(Spain) José María Díaz Muñoz	(Thailand) Roi Et United	Free transfer	4 February 2014	First team	

==== Out ====
#	Position	Player	Transferred to	Fee	Date	Team	Source
19	MF	(Hong Kong) Cheng Chi Wing	(Hong Kong) Happy Valley	Undisclosed	8 June 2013	First team	
24	DF	(Hong Kong) To Philip Michael	(Hong Kong) Happy Valley	Undisclosed	8 June 2013	First team	
12	DF	(Hong Kong) Tse Man Wing	(Hong Kong) Eastern Salon	Free transfer	11 June 2013	First team	
3	DF	(Hong Kong) Wisdom Fofo Agbo	(China) Harbin Yiteng	Undisclosed	8 July 2013	First team	
20	DF	(Hong Kong) Tsang Chiu Tat	(Hong Kong) Tuen Mun	Free transfer	18 July 2013	First team	

==== Loan In ====
#	Position	Player	Loaned from	Date	Loan expires	Team	Source
16	MF	(Hong Kong) Ngan Lok Fung	(Hong Kong) Kitchee	17 June 2013	End of the season	First team	
11	MF	(Hong Kong) Lo Chi Kwan	(Hong Kong) Kitchee	23 June 2013	End of the season	First team	
38	GK	(Hong Kong) Tsang Man Fai	(Hong Kong) South China	6 August 2013	30 June 2013	First team	
17	DF	(Hong Kong) Li Ngai Hoi	(Hong Kong) Kitchee	7 August 2013	22 January 2014	First team	
	FW	(Hong Kong) James Ha	(Hong Kong) Kitchee	17 January 2014	End of the season	First team	
	DF	(Hong Kong) Pak Wing Chak	(Hong Kong) Eastern Salon	17 January 2014	End of the season	First team	

==== Loan out ====
#	Position	Player	Loaned to	Date	Loan expires	Team	Source

== Club ==
=== Coaching staff ===
Position	Staff
Head Coach	(Hong Kong) Fung Hoi Man
Fitness Coach	(Hong Kong) To Wai Lok
Goalkeeper Coach	(Hong Kong) Tung Ho Yin

Last updated: 19 May 2013
Source: Southern District RSA

== Squad statistics ==
=== Overall Stats ===
	First Division	Senior Shield	FA Cup	Total Stats
Games played	16	2	1	19
Games won	4	1	1	6
Games drawn	5	0	0	5
Games lost	7	1	0	8
Goals for	21	4	1	26
Goals against	29	4	0	33
Players used	24	15	14	24^{1}
Yellow cards	46	7	5	58
Red cards	2	1	0	3

Last updated: 19 April 2014
Source: Player Stats

Players Used: Southern has used a total of 24 different players in all competitions.

=== Squad Stats ===
				Total				Hong Kong First Division League		Senior Challenge Shield		FA Cup		
N	Pos.	Name	Nat.	GS	App	Gls	Min	App	Gls	App	Gls	App	Gls	Notes
1	GK	Cheng Ting Hei	(Hong Kong)											(−) GA
19	GK	Tsang Man Fai	(Hong Kong)	2	2	-2	180	2	-2					(−) GA, on loan from South China
25	GK	Chiu Yu Ming	(Hong Kong)	11	11	-22	1020	9	-18	2	-4			(−) GA
37	GK	Lee Yang Xuan	(Hong Kong)											(−) GA
38	GK	Zhang Chunhui	(Hong Kong)	6	6	-8	540	5	-8			1		(−) GA
2	RB	Lam Ho Kwan	(Hong Kong)	1	2		132	2						
3	CB	Héctor	(Spain)	18	18		1558	15		2		1		
5	CB	Rubén	(Spain)	19	19	1	1715	16	1	2		1		
12	LB	Pak Wing Chak	(Hong Kong)	3	3		167	2				1		
13	LB	Ha Shing Chi	(Hong Kong)											
26	CB	Lee Sze Ho	(Hong Kong)	4	7		321	5		1		1		
28	RB	Tsang Chiu Tat	(Hong Kong)	1	2		108	2						
	LB	Li Ngai Hoi	(Hong Kong)	8	8		714	6		2				On loan from Kitchee from Aug 2013 to Jan 2014
7	RM	Chow Ka Wa	(Hong Kong)	6	18	3	770	16	3	2				
11	CM	Lo Chi Kwan	(Hong Kong)	14	17		1165	14		2		1		On loan from Kitchee
14	CM	Tsang Tsz Hin	(Hong Kong)	2	4		121	4						
15	DM	Chan Cheuk Kwong	(Hong Kong)	7	13		655	10		2		1		
16	CM	Ngan Lok Fung	(Hong Kong)	7	15	1	760	12		2		1	1	On loan from Kitchee
18	RM	Chung Hon Chee	(Hong Kong)	11	14	1	1018	12	1	1		1		
21	AM	Kwok Ting Him	(Hong Kong)		1		2	1						
22	CM	Che Runqiu	(Hong Kong)	16	17		1497	14		2		1		
23	DM	Lander	(Spain)											
27	CM	Lo Wai Tat	(Hong Kong)											
31	DM	Díaz	(Spain)	8	8	1	720	7	1			1		
33	CM	Ip Chung Long	(Hong Kong)	16	17	3	1449	14	3	2		1		
8	FW	Yago	(Spain)	12	17	3	1065	14	3	2		1		
9	FW	Carril	(Spain)	16	17	9	1523	14	6	2	3	1		
10	FW	Dieguito	(Spain)	17	18	2	1538	16	2	2				
20	FW	James Ha	(Hong Kong)	4	7		360	7						

Last updated: 19 April 2014
Ordered by Position
0 shown as blank

=== Top scorers ===
Place	Position	Nationality	Number	Name	First Division	Senior Shield	FA Cup	Total
1	FW	(Spain)	9	Jonathan Carril	5	3	0	8
2	MF	(Hong Kong)	7	Chow Ka Wa	4	0	0	4
3	FW	(Spain)	8	Yago González	3	0	0	3
4	FW	(Spain)	10	Dieguito	2	0	0	2
4	MF	(Hong Kong)	33	Ip Chung Long	2	0	0	2
6	DF	(Spain)	5	Rubén López García-Madrid	1	0	0	1
6	MF	(Hong Kong)	16	Ngan Lok Fung	1	0	0	1
6	MF	(Spain)	31	José María Díaz Muñoz	1	0	0	1
6	Own goal				0	1	0	1
TOTALS					19	4	0	23

Last updated: 19 April 2014

=== Disciplinary record ===
Includes all competitive matches. Players listed below made at least one appearance for Southern first squad during the season.

N	P	Nat.	Name	League			Shield			FA Cup			Others			Total			Notes
N	P	Nat.	Name	Yellow card	Second yellow card	Red card	Yellow card	Second yellow card	Red card	Yellow card	Second yellow card	Red card	Yellow card	Second yellow card	Red card	Yellow card	Second yellow card	Red card	Notes
2	DF	(Hong Kong)	Lam Ho Kwan																
3	DF	(Spain)	Héctor	3												3			
5	DF	(Spain)	Rubén	2		1										2		1	
7	MF	(Hong Kong)	Chow Ka Wa				1									1			
8	FW	(Spain)	Yago González	3			1									4			
9	FW	(Spain)	Carril	6												6			
10	FW	(Spain)	Dieguito	1			2									3			
11	MF	(Hong Kong)	Lo Chi Kwan	4												4			
14	MF	(Hong Kong)	Tsang Tsz Hin																
15	MF	(Hong Kong)	Chan Cheuk Kwong	2						1						3			
16	MF	(Hong Kong)	Ngan Lok Fung	2		1										2		1	
17	DF	(Hong Kong)	Li Ngai Hoi	2			1	1								3	1		
18	MF	(Hong Kong)	Chung Hong Chee	6						1						7			
19	GK	(Hong Kong)	Tsang Man Fai																
20	FW	(Hong Kong)	James Ha	2												2			
21	MF	(Hong Kong)	Kwok Ting Him																
22	MF	(China) (Hong Kong)	Che Runqiu	3			1			1						5			
25	GK	(Hong Kong)	Chiu Yu Ming	1												1			
26	DF	(Hong Kong)	Lee Sze Ho	1						1						2			
28	DF	(Hong Kong)	Tsang Chiu Tat																
31	MF	(Spain)	Díaz	3												3			
33	MF	(Hong Kong)	Ip Chung Long	5			1									6			
38	GK	(Hong Kong)	Zhang Chunhui							1						1			

Last updated: 19 April 2014
Source: Competitive matches
Ordered by (red card) , (second yellow card) and (yellow card)
(yellow card) = Number of bookings; (second yellow card) = Number of sending offs after a second yellow card; (red card) = Number of sending offs by a direct red card.

=== Substitution Record ===
Includes all competitive matches.

			League		Shield		FA Cup		Others		Total	
No.	Pos	Name	subson	subsoff	subson	subsoff	subson	subsoff	subson	subsoff	subson	subsoff
Goalkeepers
1	GK	Cheng Ting Hei	0	0	0	0	0	0	0	0	0	0
19	GK	Tsang Man Fai	0	0	0	0	0	0	0	0	0	0
25	GK	Chiu Yu Ming	0	0	0	0	0	0	0	0	0	0
37	GK	Lee Yang Xuan	0	0	0	0	0	0	0	0	0	0
38	GK	Zhang Chunhui	0	0	0	0	0	0	0	0	0	0
Defenders
2	RB	Lam Ho Kwan	1	1	0	0	0	0	0	0	1	1
3	CB	Héctor	0	3	0	0	0	0	0	0	0	3
5	CB	Rubén	0	0	0	0	0	0	0	0	0	0
12	LB	Pak Wing Chak	0	1	0	0	0	1	0	0	0	2
13	LB	Ha Shing Chi	0	0	0	0	0	0	0	0	0	0
26	CB	Lee Sze Ho	2	1	1	0	0	1	0	0	3	2
28	RB	Tsang Chiu Tat	1	0	0	0	0	0	0	0	1	0
	LB	Li Ngai Hoi	1	2	0	1	0	0	0	0	1	3
Midfielders
7	RM	Chow Ka Wa	10	3	2	0	0	0	0	0	12	3
11	CM	Lo Chi Kwan	2	7	1	1	0	0	0	0	3	8
14	CM	Tsang Tsz Hin	2	2	0	0	0	0	0	0	2	2
15	DM	Chan Cheuk Kwong	5	2	0	1	1	0	0	0	6	3
16	CM	Ngan Lok Fung	7	3	0	2	1	0	0	0	8	5
18	RM	Chung Hon Chee	2	2	1	0	0	0	0	0	3	2
21	AM	Kwok Ting Him	1	0	0	0	0	0	0	0	1	0
22	CM	Che Runqiu	1	2	0	0	0	0	0	0	1	2
23	DM	Lander	0	0	0	0	0	0	0	0	0	0
27	CM	Lo Wai Tat	0	0	0	0	0	0	0	0	0	0
31	DM	Díaz	0	0	0	0	0	0	0	0	0	0
33	CM	Ip Chung Long	0	3	0	0	1	0	0	0	1	3
Forwards
8	SS	Yago	4	5	1	1	0	1	0	0	5	7
9	CF	Carril	1	1	0	0	0	0	0	0	1	1
10	SS	Dieguito	1	4	0	0	0	0	0	0	1	4
20	WI	James Ha	3	2	0	0	0	0	0	0	3	2

Last updated: 19 April 2014

=== Captains ===
No.	P	Name	Country	No. games	Notes
5	DF	Rubén	(Spain)	19	Captain

Last updated: 19 April 2014
Source: Competitive match reports.
Competitive matches only
Matches started as captain only
Country: FIFA nationality; No.: Squad number; P: Position; Name: Player name; No. Games: Number of games started as captain.

== Competitions ==
=== Overall ===
Competition	Started round	Current position / round	Final position / round	First match	Last match
Hong Kong First Division League	—	6th		1 September 2013	
Senior Challenge Shield	Quarter-finals	—	Semi-finals	7 December 2013	26 December 2013
FA Cup	Round of 16	Quarter-finals		18 February 2014	

Updated to match played 6 April 2013
Source: Competitions

=== First Division League ===
==== Classification ====
Pos	Team	Pld	W	D	L	GF	GA	GD	Pts	Qualification or relegation
2	Sun Pegasus	18	10	2	6	40	28	+12	32	2013–14 Hong Kong season play-off
3	South China	18	8	8	2	35	24	+11	32	2015 AFC Cup (Note: South China won the 2013–14 Hong Kong season play-off and thus qualified for the 2015 AFC Cup group stage.)
4	Royal Southern (R)	18	5	6	7	25	32	−7	21	2013–14 Hong Kong season play-off and relegation to 2014–15 Hong Kong First Division League (Note: Since the 2013–14 Hong Kong Senior Challenge Shield winners (South China) would at this point qualify for the 2013–14 Hong Kong season play-off, the 4th placed team would qualify for the Season Play-off. At the same time, Royal Southern declined to participate in the 2014–15 Hong Kong Premier League and would self-relegate in the following season.)
5	Hong Kong Rangers	18	5	6	7	23	32	−9	21	
6	Eastern Salon	18	5	6	7	34	37	−3	21	2013–14 Hong Kong season play-off (Note: Eastern Salon qualified for the 2013–14 Hong Kong season play-off as winners of the 2013–14 Hong Kong FA Cup.)

Updated to match(es) played on 11 May 2014. Source: Hong Kong Football Association
Rules for classification: 1) points; 2) head-to-head points; 3) head-to-head goal difference; 4) head-to-head goals scored; 5) goal difference; 6) number of goals scored.
(R) Relegated

==== Results summary ====
Overall								Home						Away					
Pld	W	D	L	GF	GA	GD	Pts	W	D	L	GF	GA	GD	W	D	L	GF	GA	GD
16	4	5	7	21	29	−8	17	3	4	2	13	12	+1	1	1	5	8	17	−9

Last updated: 19 April 2014.
Source: First Division

==== Results by round ====
Round	1	2	3	4	6	7	10	8	9	5	11	12	13	14	15	16	17	18	19	20	21	22
Ground	A	A	H	A	H	H	H	H	A	H	A	A	A	H	A	H	A	H	H	A	A	A
Result	L	W	D	L	W	L	W	V	D	V	L	W	L	D	V	L	D	V	D	L		
Position	9	6	4	6	3	5	3	3	4	4	5	3	3	3	5	5	5	5	6	6		

Updated to match(es) played on 19 April 2014. Source: Competitive Matches
A = Away; H = Home; W = Win; D = Draw; L = Loss; V = Voided

== Matches ==
Win Draw Loss Void

=== Pre-season friendlies ===
2 August 2013	Royal Southern (Hong Kong)	4 – 0	Hong Kong U18	Wong Tai Sin, Kowloon
10:30 UTC+8			Lo Chi Kwan; Yago; Carril	Stadium: Po Kong Village Road Park

6 August 2013	Royal Southern (Hong Kong)	1 – 1	Hong Kong U23	So Kon Po, Hong Kong Island
10:00 UTC+8	Goal		Goal	Stadium: So Kon Po Sports Ground

9 August 2013	Yuen Long (Hong Kong)	0 – 1	(Hong Kong) Royal Southern	Tsing Yi, New Territories
16:30 UTC+8			Ip Chung Long	Stadium: Tsing Yi Northeast Park

16 August 2013	Guangdong U-20 A (China)	v	(Hong Kong) Royal Southern	Guangzhou, China PR
TBA				Stadium: Zhu Liao Football Training Base

18 August 2013	Guangdong U-20 B (China)	v	(Hong Kong) Royal Southern	Guangzhou, China PR
TBA				Stadium: Zhu Liao Football Training Base

19 August 2013	Yokohama FC Hong Kong	v	(Hong Kong) Royal Southern	Guangzhou, China PR
TBA				Stadium: Sanshui Football Training Base

=== First Division League ===
1 September 2013 Round 1	South China	3 – 2	Royal Southern	Mong Kok, Kowloon
17:30 UTC+8	Sealy (yellow card) 10'; Barry 48', 74' (pen.); Ticão (yellow card) 63'; Zhang Chunhui (yellow card) 81'; Tse 86'	Report	42' Carril; 61' Yago; (yellow card) 73' Lo Chi Kwan; (yellow card) 80' Héctor; (yellow card) 81' Rubén; (yellow card) 90+1' Ngan Lok Fung	Stadium: Mong Kok Stadium (Note: Due to bad pitch condition, the match will be played at Mong Kok Stadium instead of South China's home ground Hong Kong Stadium.) (Capacity: 6,680); Attendance: 2,566; Referee: Tong Kui Sum; Assistant referees: Chan Shui Hung, Yu Chun San; Fourth official: Sarao Amarjit Singh

15 September 2013 Round 2	I-Sky Yuen Long	0 – 1	Royal Southern	Yuen Long, New Territories
17:30 UTC+8	Gustavo (yellow card) 57'; Fung Kai Hong (yellow card) 82'; Sandro (yellow card) 90+3'; Souza (yellow card) 90+4'	Report	(yellow card) 5' Chung Hon Chee; (yellow card) 61' Yago; (yellow card) 72' Héctor; (yellow card) 77' Che Runqiu; 90' Carril; (yellow card) 90+4' Ngan Lok Fung	Stadium: Yuen Long Stadium (Capacity: 4,932); Attendance: 1,004; Referee: Chan Shui Hung; Assistant referees: Cheng Oi Cho, Chan Siu Ming; Fourth official: Fok Pong Shing

21 September 2013 Round 3	Royal Southern	1 – 1	Citizen	Aberdeen, Hong Kong Island
14:30 UTC+8	Yago 34'; Chung Hon Chee (yellow card) 80'	Report	(yellow card) 19' Krasić; 36' Detinho; (yellow card) 54' Chan Hin Kwong	Stadium: Aberdeen Sports Ground (Capacity: 4,000); Attendance: 544; Referee: Ho Wai Sing; Assistant referees: Lui Siu Chuen, Tang Hing Fu; Fourth official: Luk Kin Sun

28 September 2013 Round 4	Sun Pegasus	2 – 1	Royal Southern	Mong Kok, Kowloon
17:30 UTC+8	Cesar (yellow card) 36'; Ranđelović 38'; Landon Ling (yellow card) 53'; Mbome (yellow card) 61'; Campion 76'	Report	(yellow card) 17' Chung Hong Chee; (yellow card) 20' Chiu Yu Ming; (yellow card) 55' Chan Cheuk Kwong; 72' Chow Ka Wa	Stadium: Mong Kok Stadium (Capacity: 6,680); Attendance: 1,501; Referee: Liu Kwok Man; Assistant referees: Chow Chun Kit, Lau Hong Hei; Fourth official: Yau Tsz Yeung

6 October 2013 Round 5	Royal Southern	Postponed	Tuen Mun	Aberdeen, Hong Kong Island
14:30 UTC+8				Stadium: Aberdeen Sports Ground (Capacity: 4,000)

19 October 2013 Round 6	Royal Southern	2 – 1	Sunray Cave JC Sun Hei	Aberdeen, Hong Kong Island
14:30 UTC+8	Carril 45+1'; Ip Chung Long 79'	Report	27' Kilama; (yellow card) 44' Yuen Chun Nam; (yellow card) 56' Reinaldo; (yellow card) 64' Bouet; (yellow card) 90' Wong Chun Hin	Stadium: Aberdeen Sports Ground (Capacity: 4,000); Attendance: 364; Referee: Liu Kwok Man; Assistant referees: Chan Ming Siu, Sarao Amarjit Singh; Fourth official: Ho Wai Sing

3 November 2013 Round 7	Royal Southern	0 – 1	Kitchee	Aberdeen, Hong Kong Island
14:30 UTC+8	Ip Chung Long (yellow card) 50'	Report	5' Jordi	Stadium: Aberdeen Sports Ground (Capacity: 4,000); Attendance: 586; Referee: Lau Fong Hei; Assistant referees: Yu Chun Sun, Fok Pong Shing; Fourth official: Ng Kai Lam

23 November 2013 Round 10	Royal Southern	2 – 1	Biu Chun Rangers	Aberdeen, Hong Kong Island
14:30 UTC+8	Dieguito 24'; Li Ngai Hoi (yellow card) 33'; Ip Chung Long (yellow card) 63'; Chow Ka Wa 70'	Report	(yellow card) 11' Miroslav; 56' Schutz; (yellow card) 63' Chan Ming Kong	Stadium: Aberdeen Sports Ground (Capacity: 4,000); Attendance: 319; Referee: Ho Wai Sing; Assistant referees: Luk Kin Sun, Yu Kin Fung; Fourth official: Chan Ming Siu

30 November 2013 Round 8	Happy Valley	2 – 4 (Voided)	Royal Southern	Tai Po, New Territories
14:30 UTC+8	Acosta 23'; Arce (yellow card) 34'; Akosah 53'	Report	(yellow card) 18' Ip Chung Long; 48', 55', 67' Carril; (yellow card) 59' Li Ngai Hoi; 64' Yago	Stadium: Tai Po Sports Ground (Capacity: 3,000); Attendance: 283; Referee: Lui Siu Chuen; Assistant referees: Chan Shui Hung, Yu Kin Fung; Fourth official: Lo Yuk Ming

14 December 2013 Round 9	Royal Southern	2 – 2	Yokohama FC Hong Kong	Aberdeen, Hong Kong Island
14:30 UTC+8	Carril 31' (yellow card) 33'; Lo Chi Kwan (yellow card) 50'; Chan Cheuk Kwong (yellow card) 77'; Chow Ka Wa 81'	Report	(yellow card) 21' (goal) 29' Liang Zicheng; (yellow card) 50' Li Shu Yeung; (yellow card) 56' Fong Pak Lun; 87' Yoshitake	Stadium: Aberdeen Sports Ground (Capacity: 4,000); Attendance: 283; Referee: Lau Fong Hei; Assistant referees: Chai Shui Hung, Lam Nai Kei; Fourth official: Ng Wai Hong

11 January 2014 Round 5R	Royal Southern	Cancelled	Tuen Mun	Aberdeen, Hong Kong Island
14:30 UTC+8				Stadium: Aberdeen Sports Ground (Capacity: 4,000)

26 January 2014 Round 11	Eastern Salon	4 – 1	Royal Southern	Sham Shui Po, Kowloon
14:30 UTC+8	Beto (yellow card) 22' (goal) 56' (pen.); Itaparica (yellow card) 44'; Giovane 52', 89'; Leung Chi Wing (yellow card) 59'; Macallister 82'; Li Haiqiang (yellow card) 86'	Report	(yellow card) 16' Lo Chi Kwan; (yellow card) 22' Rubén; 31' Ip Chung Long; (red card) 62' Ngan Lok Fung; (yellow card) 63' Yago	Stadium: Sham Shui Po Sports Ground (Note: The match will be played at Sham Shui Po Sports Ground instead of Eastern Salon's home ground Shing Mun Valley Sports Ground.) (Capacity: 2,194); Attendance: 919; Referee: Ng Chiu Kok; Assistant referees: Lau Fong Hei, Sarao Amarjit Singh; Fourth official: Luk Kin Sun

9 February 2014 Round 12	Royal Southern	3 – 2	Eastern Salon	Aberdeen, Hong Kong Island
14:30 UTC+8	Lo Chi Kwan (yellow card) 19'; Carril 36'; Chung Hon Chee 42'; Díaz (yellow card) 70'; Héctor (yellow card) 75'; Ip Chung Long 81' (yellow card) 83'	Report	64' (yellow card) 77' Li Haiqiang; (yellow card) 68' Liang Zicheng; 84' Clayton; (yellow card) 90+12' Leung Kwok Wai	Stadium: Aberdeen Sports Ground (Capacity: 4,000); Attendance: 468; Referee: Tong Kui Sum; Assistant referees: Cheng Oi Cho, Lui Siu Chuen; Fourth official: Sarao Amarjit Singh

15 February 2014 Round 13	Kitchee	4 – 0	Royal Southern	Mong Kok, Kowloon
14:30 UTC+8	Alex 2'; Lam Ka Wai 19'; Dani 36'; Jordi 69'; Xu Deshuai (yellow card) 84'	Report	(yellow card) 13' Carril; (yellow card) 53' Che Runqiu; (yellow card) 64' Dieguito	Stadium: Mong Kok Stadium (Capacity: 6,680); Attendance: 869; Referee: Liu Kwok Man; Assistant referees: Lui Siu Chuen, Sarao Armanjit Singh; Fourth official: Ng Wai Hong

23 February 2014 Round 14	Royal Southern	1 – 1	I-Sky Yuen Long	Aberdeen, Hong Kong Island
14:30 UTC+8	Carril (yellow card) 32'; Díaz (yellow card) 42' (goal) 63'; Chung Hon Chee (yellow card) 74'	Report	28' Fábio; (yellow card) 70' Cheung Chi Kin; (yellow card) 83' Cheng King Ho	Stadium: Aberdeen Sports Ground (Capacity: 4,000); Attendance: 305; Referee: Chan Ming Siu; Assistant referees: Lui Siu Chuen, Yu Chun Sun; Fourth official: Ho Wai Sing

8 March 2014 Round 15	Tuen Mun	Cancelled	Royal Southern	Tuen Mun, New Territories
14:30 UTC+8				Stadium: Tuen Mun Tang Shiu Kin Sports Ground (Capacity: 2,200)

15 March 2014 Round 16	Royal Southern	1 – 2	Sun Pegasus	Aberdeen, Hong Kong Island
14:30 UTC+8	Carril 37' (pen.) (yellow card) 87'; Ip Chung Long (yellow card) 55'; Chung Hong Chee (yellow card) 77'; James Ha (yellow card) 90+4'	Report	(yellow card) 36' Škorić; (yellow card) 42' Mbome; 63' McKee; (yellow card) 86' Miović; 89' Ranđelović	Stadium: Aberdeen Sports Ground (Capacity: 4,000); Attendance: 526; Referee: Ho Wai Sing; Assistant referees: Chow Chun Kit, Yau Tsz Yeung; Fourth official: Tang Hing Fu

23 March 2014 Round 17	Yokohama FC Hong Kong	2 – 2	Royal Southern	Tseung Kwan O, New Territories
17:30 UTC+8	Lau Cheuk Hin (yellow card) 30'; Leung Kwun Chung 54'; Fukuda 70'	Report	3' Yago; (yellow card) 50' Che Runqiu; 56' Rubén; (yellow card) 57' (yellow-red card) 85' Tan Chun Lok; (yellow card) 90+3' Diaz	Stadium: Tseung Kwan O Sports Ground (Capacity: 3,500); Attendance: 388; Referee: Ng Chiu Kok; Assistant referees: Luk Kin Sun, Lee Chung Yin; Fourth official: Wong Ping Chung

29 March 2014 Round 18	Royal Southern	Cancelled	Happy Valley	Aberdeen, Hong Kong Island
14:30 UTC+8				Stadium: Aberdeen Sports Ground (Capacity: 4,000)

5 April 2014 Round 19	Royal Southern	1 – 1	South China	Aberdeen, Hong Kong Island
12:30 UTC+8	Chung Hon Chee (yellow card) 28'; Yago (yellow card) 70'; Chow Ka Wa 71'; Carril (yellow card) 72'	Report	20' Weijl; (yellow card) 87' Chan Siu Kwan	Stadium: Aberdeen Sports Ground (Capacity: 4,000); Attendance: 512; Referee: Ng Chiu Kok; Assistant referees: Yau Ho Fai, Sarao Amarjit Singh; Fourth official: Lui Siu Chuen

19 April 2014 Round 20	Citizen	2 – 1	Royal Southern	Tsing Yi, New Territories
14:30 UTC+8	Festus 66' (pen.); Detinho 76'; Tam Lok Hin (yellow card) 78'	Report	(yellow card) 15' Lee Sze Ho; 22' Dieguito; (red card) 65' Rubén; (yellow card) 74' James Ha	Stadium: Tsing Yi Sports Ground (Capacity: 1,500); Attendance: 305; Referee: Ho Wai Sing; Assistant referees: Yu Chun Sun, Mok Ka Ming; Fourth official: Liu Kwok Man

4 May 2014 Round 21	Biu Chun Rangers	v	Royal Southern	Sham Shui Po, Kowloon
14:30 UTC+8				Stadium: Sham Shui Po Sports Ground (Capacity: 2,194)

10–11 May 2014 Round 22	Sunray Cave JC Sun Hei	v	Royal Southern	Tsing Yi, New Territories
TBC				Stadium: Tsing Yi Sports Ground (Capacity: 1,500)

=== Senior Shield ===
7 December 2013 Quarter-finals	Royal Southern	2 – 1	Sunray Cave JC Sun Hei	Mong Kok, Kowloon
14:30 UTC+8	Carril 6', 33'; Li Ngai Hoi (yellow card) 49'; Dieguito (yellow card) 65'; Chow Ka Wa (yellow card) 90+2'	Report	(yellow card) 12' Jing Teng; (yellow card) 53' Zhang Jun; 89' Yuen Tsun Nam	Stadium: Mong Kok Stadium (Capacity: 6,680); Attendance: 933; Referee: Tong Kui Sum; Assistant referees: Yau Ho Fai, Chan Ming Siu; Fourth official: Chow Chun Kit

26 December 2013 Semi-finals	Sun Pegasus	3 – 2 (a.e.t.)	Royal Southern	Mong Kok, Kowloon
14:30 UTC+8	Miović (yellow card) 35'; Chan Pak Hang 45+1'; Ju Yingzhi 78', 109' (yellow card) 109'; Landon Ling (yellow card) 85'	Report	(yellow card) 54' (yellow-red card) 103' Li Ngai Hoi; 64' (o.g.) Mbome; 76' Carril; (yellow card) 88' Yago; (yellow card) 90+5' Che Runqiu; (yellow card) 109' Dieguito; (yellow card) 119' Ip Chung Long	Stadium: Mong Kok Stadium (Capacity: 6,680); Attendance: 2,501; Referee: Tong Kui Sum; Assistant referees: Lau Fong Hei, Lui Siu Chuen; Fourth official: Yu Kin Fung

=== FA Cup ===
18 February 2014 Round of 16	Happy Valley	DQ – w/o	Royal Southern	Mong Kok, Kowloon
20:00 (UTC+8)				Stadium: Mong Kok Stadium (Capacity: 6,680)

12 April 2014 Quarter-finals	Royal Southern	1 – 0	Citizen	Tseung Kwan O, Kowloon
14:30 UTC+8	Lee Sze Ho (yellow card) 21'; Chung Hon Chee (yellow card) 22'; Ngan Lok Fung 76'; Chan Cheuk Kwong (yellow card) 88'; Che Runqiu (yellow card) 89'; Zhang Chunhui (yellow card) 90+3'	Report	(yellow card) 55' Krasić	Stadium: Tseung Kwan O Sports Ground (Capacity: 3,500); Attendance: 322; Referee: Luk Kin Sun; Assistant referees: Cheng Oi Cho, Tang Hing Fu; Fourth official: Chan Shui Hung

26 April 2014 Semi-finals	Royal Southern	v	Eastern Salon	Mong Kok, Kowloon
14:30 UTC+8				Stadium: Mong Kok Stadium (Capacity: 6,680)
