= 2012–13 Hong Kong season play-off =

Football tournament

Hong Kong season play-off
- Season: 2012–13
- Matches played: 3
- Goals scored: 8 (2.67 per match)
- Top goalscorer: (Brazil) Daniel (Tuen Mun) (2 goals)
- Total attendance: 4,081
- Average attendance: 1,360

Hong Kong season play-off for the 2012–13 football season was held in May 2013. All matches took place at Mong Kok Stadium in Mong Kok, Kowloon.

The play-off semi-finals are played in one match each, contested by the teams who finished in 2nd and 3rd place in the First Division League table, the winners of the Senior Challenge Shield and the champions of the FA Cup. The winners of the semi-finals go through to the finals, with the winner of the final gaining participation for the 2014 AFC Cup group stage.

== Qualified teams ==
=== First Division League ===
The teams with final position between 2nd and 5th inclusively guaranteed places in the play-off.

Pos	Team	Pld	W	D	L	GF	GA	GD	Pts	Qualification or relegation
1	South China (C)	18	11	3	4	46	21	+25	36	2014 AFC Champions League play-off stage
2	Kitchee	18	9	5	4	39	23	+16	32	2014 AFC Cup (Note: Kitchee won the 2012–13 Hong Kong Season play-off and thus qualified for the 2014 AFC Cup Group stage.)
3	Tuen Mun	18	8	4	6	29	31	−2	28	2012–13 Hong Kong Season play-off (Note: Southern qualified for the play-offs as Kitchee defeated Sun Pegasus in the FA Cup while they have guaranteed a place for the play-offs, meaning the league 4th place qualifies.)
4	Southern	18	6	6	6	24	27	−3	24	2012–13 Hong Kong Season play-off
5	Sun Pegasus	18	4	9	5	35	29	+6	21	

Updated to match(es) played on 26 May 2013. Source:
Rules for classification: 1) points; 2) head-to-head points; 3) head-to-head goal difference; 4) head-to-head goals scored; 5) goal difference; 6) number of goals scored.
(C) Champions
Notes:

Qualified teams:

- Kitchee
- Tuen Mun
- Southern

=== Senior Challenge Shield ===
The winners of the Senior Challenge Shield guaranteed a place in the play-off.

Winners:

- Wofoo Tai Po

=== FA Cup ===
The winners of the FA Cup will guarantee a place in the play-off.

Winners:

- Kitchee

Note: Since Kitchee won the FA Cup champions, the 4th place in the league (i.e. Southern) is guaranteed a place in the play-offs, as Kitchee have qualified to the play-off.

== Calendar ==
Round	Draw Date	Date	Matches	Clubs
Semi-finals	11 May 2013	18–19 May 2013	2	4 → 2
Final	11 May 2013	26 May 2012 at Mong Kok Stadium	1	2 → 1

== Bracket ==
Semi-finals
CW/L2	Kitchee	2
L4	Southern	0
L3	Tuen Mun	2
SW	Wofoo Tai Po	1

Final
CW/L2	Kitchee	3
L3	Tuen Mun	0

== Fixtures and results ==
=== Semi-finals ===
==== Tuen Mun vs Wofoo Tai Po ====
18 May 2013	Tuen Mun	2 – 1	Wofoo Tai Po	Mong Kok, Kowloon
16:00(GMT+8)	Daniel 6', 89'	Report	42' (pen.) Aender	Stadium: Mong Kok Stadium (Capacity:6,680); Attendance: 1,250; Referee: Tong Kui Sum

Tuen Mun	Wofoo Tai Po

TUEN MUN:
GK	13	(Hong Kong) Wei Zhao^{LP}
RB	16	(Hong Kong) Lai Yiu Cheong^{LP}	(yellow card) 41'
CB	6	(Brazil) Mauricio Correa Da Luz^{FP}		(substituted off) 37'
CB	15	(Brazil) Beto^{FP}
LB	2	(Hong Kong) Kwok Wing Sun^{LP}
DM	3	(Brazil) Diego Eli Moreira^{FP}
CM	22	(Hong Kong) Li Haiqiang^{LP} (c)
CM	11	(Hong Kong) Yip Tsz Chun^{LP}		(substituted off) 79'
RW	7	(Hong Kong) Ling Cong^{LP}
LW	20	(Hong Kong) Chao Pengfei^{LP}		(substituted off) 90+3'
CF	9	(Brazil) Daniel Goulart Quevedo^{FP}	(yellow card) 89'
Substitutes:
GK	1	(Hong Kong) Siu Leong^{LP}
DF	5	(Hong Kong) Cheng Ting Chi^{LP}
DF	12	(China) Xie Silida^{LP}		(substituted in) 37'
DF	28	(Hong Kong) Wong Chi Chung^{LP}		(substituted in) 90+3'
MF	8	(Hong Kong) Chow Cheuk Fung^{LP}		(substituted in) 79'
MF	21	(Hong Kong) Cheung Man Lok^{LP}
FW	27	(Hong Kong) Cheung Chi Fung^{LP}
Coach:
(Hong Kong) Yan Lik Kin

WOFOO TAI PO:
GK	33	(Hong Kong) Pang Tsz Kin^{LP}
RB	19	(Hong Kong) Li Shu Yeung^{LP}	(yellow card) 38'	(substituted off) 58'
CB	21	(Hong Kong) Chan Yuk Chi^{LP}		(substituted off) 85'
CB	5	(Brazil) Clayton Michel Afonso^{FP}
LB	3	(Hong Kong) Chan Sze Wing^{LP}
DM	10	(Hong Kong) Lui Chi Hing^{LP} (c)
CM	7	(Brazil) Aender Naves Mesquita^{FP}
AM	23	(Hong Kong) Ye Jia^{LP}	(yellow card) 45+3'
RW	25	(Hong Kong) Che Run Qiu^{LP}
LW	15	(Ghana) Christian Annan^{LP}
CF	17	(Nigeria) Caleb Ekwegwo^{FP}		(substituted off) 64'
Substitutes:
GK	1	(Hong Kong) Li Hon Ho^{LP}
DF	2	(Hong Kong) Shek Tsz Fung^{LP}
DF	6	(Hong Kong) Chen Jingde^{LP}
MF	13	(Hong Kong) To Hon To^{LP}		(substituted in) 58'
MF	18	(Hong Kong) Wong Yim Kwan^{LP}
MF	26	(Hong Kong) Jing Teng^{LP}		(substituted in) 85'
FW	9	(Hong Kong) Chen Liming^{LP}		(substituted in) 64'
Coach:
(Hong Kong) Cheung Po Chun

MATCH OFFICIALS

- Assistant referees:
  - Cheng Oi Cho
  - Chan Shui Hung
- Fourth official: Lau Fong Hei
- ^{LP} Local Player
- ^{FP} Foreign Player

MATCH RULES

- 90 minutes. (1st Half Added Time: 3 mins, 2nd Half Added Time: 5 mins)
- 30 minutes of extra-time if necessary.
- Penalty shoot-out if scores still level.
- Seven named substitutes
- Maximum of 3 substitutions.

==== Kitchee vs Southern ====
19 May 2013	Kitchee	2 – 0	Southern	Mong Kok, Kowloon
16:00(GMT+8)	Yago 7'; Matt Lam 81'	Report		Stadium: Mong Kok Stadium (Capacity:6,680); Attendance: 1,255; Referee: Ho Wai Sing

Kitchee	Southern

KITCHEE:
GK	1	(Hong Kong) Wang Zhenpeng^{LP}
RB	12	(Hong Kong) Lo Kwan Yee^{LP}		(substituted off) 46'
CB	2	(Spain) Fernando Recio^{FP}		(substituted off) 58'
CB	5	(Pakistan) Zesh Rehman^{FP}
LB	20	(Hong Kong) Cheung Kin Fung^{LP}
DM	19	(Hong Kong) Huang Yang^{LP}
CM	7	(Hong Kong) Chu Siu Kei^{LP} (c)
CM	10	(Hong Kong) Lam Ka Wai^{LP}		(substituted off) 54'
RW	18	(Spain) Jordi Tarrés^{FP}
LW	13	(Hong Kong) Chan Man Fai^{LP}
CF	11	(Spain) Yago González^{FP}	(yellow card) 28'
Substitutes:
GK	23	(China) Guo Jianqiao^{LP}
DF	3	(Spain) Dani Cancela^{FP}		(substituted in) 58'
DF	21	(Hong Kong) Tsang Kam To^{LP}		(substituted in) 46'
MF	15	(Canada) Matt Lam^{LP}		(substituted in) 54'
MF	22	(Hong Kong) Lo Chi Kwan^{LP}
FW	8	(Spain) Pablo Couñago^{FP}
FW	28	(Hong Kong) Cheng Siu Wai^{LP}
Coach:
(Spain) Josep Gombau

SOUTHERN:
GK	1	(Hong Kong) Lee Yang Xuan^{LP}
RB	20	(Hong Kong) Tsang Chiu Tat^{LP}		(substituted off) 86'
CB	5	(Spain) Rubén López García-Madrid^{FP}
CB	3	(Ghana) Wisdom Fofo Agbo^{LP} (c)
LB	12	(Hong Kong) Tse Man Wing^{LP}	(yellow card) 71'
DM	15	(Hong Kong) Chan Cheuk Kwong^{LP}		(substituted off) 67'
DM	26	(Hong Kong) Lee Sze Ho^{LP}		(substituted off) 80'
RM	18	(Hong Kong) Chung Hon Chee^{LP}
LM	7	(Hong Kong) Chow Ka Wa^{LP}
AM	9	(Spain) Dieguito^{FP}
CF	11	(Cameroon) Paul Ngue^{FP}
Substitutes:
DF	13	(Hong Kong) Ha Shing Chi^{LP}
DF	24	(Hong Kong) To Philip Michael^{LP}		(substituted in) 86'
MF	14	(Hong Kong) Tsang Tsz Hin^{LP}
MF	16	(Hong Kong) Ip Chung Long^{LP}	(yellow card) 73'	(substituted in) 67'
MF	19	(Hong Kong) Cheng Chi Wing^{LP}		(substituted in) 80'
MF	21	(Hong Kong) Kwok Ting Him^{LP}
MF	22	(Hong Kong) Ng Siu Fai^{LP}
Coach:
(Hong Kong) Fung Hoi Man

MATCH OFFICIALS

- Assistant referees:
  - Chow Chun Kit
  - Yu Chun San
- Fourth official: Luk Kin Sun
- ^{LP} Local Player
- ^{FP} Foreign Player

MATCH RULES

- 90 minutes. (1st Half Added Time: 1 min, 2nd Half Added Time: 5 mins)
- 30 minutes of extra-time if necessary.
- Penalty shoot-out if scores still level.
- Seven named substitutes
- Maximum of 3 substitutions.

=== Final ===
26 May 2013	Kitchee	3 – 0	Tuen Mun	Mong Kok, Kowloon
16:00(GMT+8)	Jordi 59'; Huang Yang 67'; Chan Man Fai 79'	Report		Stadium: Mong Kok Stadium (Capacity:6,680); Attendance: 1,576; Referee: Ng Chiu Kok

Kitchee	Tuen Mun

HOME TEAM:
GK	23	(China) Guo Jianqiao^{LP}
RB	12	(Hong Kong) Lo Kwan Yee^{LP}
CB	2	(Spain) Fernando Recio^{FP}	(yellow card) 27'	(substituted off) 64'
CB	5	(Pakistan) Zesh Rehman^{FP}	(yellow card) 89'
LB	20	(Hong Kong) Cheung Kin Fung^{LP}
DM	19	(Hong Kong) Huang Yang^{LP}
CM	7	(Hong Kong) Chu Siu Kei^{LP} (c)	(yellow card) 20'
CM	10	(Hong Kong) Lam Ka Wai^{LP}
RW	18	(Spain) Jordi Tarrés^{FP}		(substituted off) 80'
LW	28	(Hong Kong) Cheng Siu Wai^{LP}		(substituted off) 62'
CF	8	(Spain) Pablo Couñago^{FP}	(red card) 84'
Substitutes:
GK	1	(Hong Kong) Wang Zhenpeng^{LP}
DF	3	(Spain) Dani Cancela^{FP}		(substituted in) 64'
DF	21	(Hong Kong) Tsang Kam To^{LP}
MF	15	(Canada) Matt Lam^{LP}
MF	22	(Hong Kong) Lo Chi Kwan^{LP}
FW	11	(Spain) Yago González^{FP}	(yellow card) 85'	(substituted in) 80'
FW	13	(Hong Kong) Chan Man Fai^{LP}		(substituted in) 62'
Coach:
(Spain) Josep Gombau

AWAY TEAM:
GK	13	(Hong Kong) Wei Zhao^{LP}
RB	16	(Hong Kong) Lai Yiu Cheong^{LP}		(substituted off) 46'
CB	15	(Brazil) Beto^{FP}	(yellow card) 86'
CB	12	(China) Xie Silida^{LP}
LB	2	(Hong Kong) Kwok Wing Sun^{LP}	(yellow card) 18'	(substituted off) 75'
DM	3	(Brazil) Diego Eli Moreira^{FP}	(yellow card) 37'	(substituted off) 70'
CM	22	(Hong Kong) Li Haiqiang^{LP} (c)	(red card) 90'
CM	11	(Hong Kong) Yip Tsz Chun^{FP}
RW	7	(Hong Kong) Ling Cong^{LP}
LW	20	(Hong Kong) Chao Pengfei^{LP}
FW	9	(Brazil) Daniel Goulart Quevedo^{FP}	(yellow card) 65'
Substitutes:
GK	1	(Hong Kong) Siu Leong^{LP}
DF	5	(Hong Kong) Cheng Ting Chi^{LP}		(substituted in) 75'
DF	28	(Hong Kong) Wong Chi Chung^{LP}		(substituted in) 46'
MF	8	(Hong Kong) Chow Cheuk Fung^{LP}
MF	14	(Hong Kong) Law Ka Lok^{LP}	(yellow card) 84'	(substituted in) 70'
MF	21	(Hong Kong) Cheung Man Lok^{LP}
FW	27	(Hong Kong) Cheung Chi Fung^{LP}
Coach:
(Hong Kong) Yan Lik Kin

MATCH OFFICIALS

- Assistant referees:
  - Chung Ming Sang
  - Lam Nai Kei
- Fourth official: Cheng Oi Cho
- ^{LP} Local Player
- ^{FP} Foreign Player

MATCH RULES

- 90 minutes. (1st Half Added Time: 2 mins, 2nd Half Added Time: 2 mins)
- 30 minutes of extra-time if necessary.
- Penalty shoot-out if scores still level.
- Seven named substitutes
- Maximum of 3 substitutions.

== Scorers ==
The scorers in the 2013 Hong Kong AFC Cup play-offs are as follows:

2 goals

- (Brazil) Daniel Goulart Quevedo (Tuen Mun)

1 goal

- (Hong Kong) Chan Man Fai (Kitchee)
- (Hong Kong) Huang Yang (Kitchee)
- (Spain) Jordi Tarrés (Kitchee)
- (Canada) Matt Lam (Kitchee)
- (Spain) Yago González (Kitchee)
- (Brazil) Aender Naves Mesquita (Wofoo Tai Po)
