= Chow Ka Wa =

Hong Kong football player

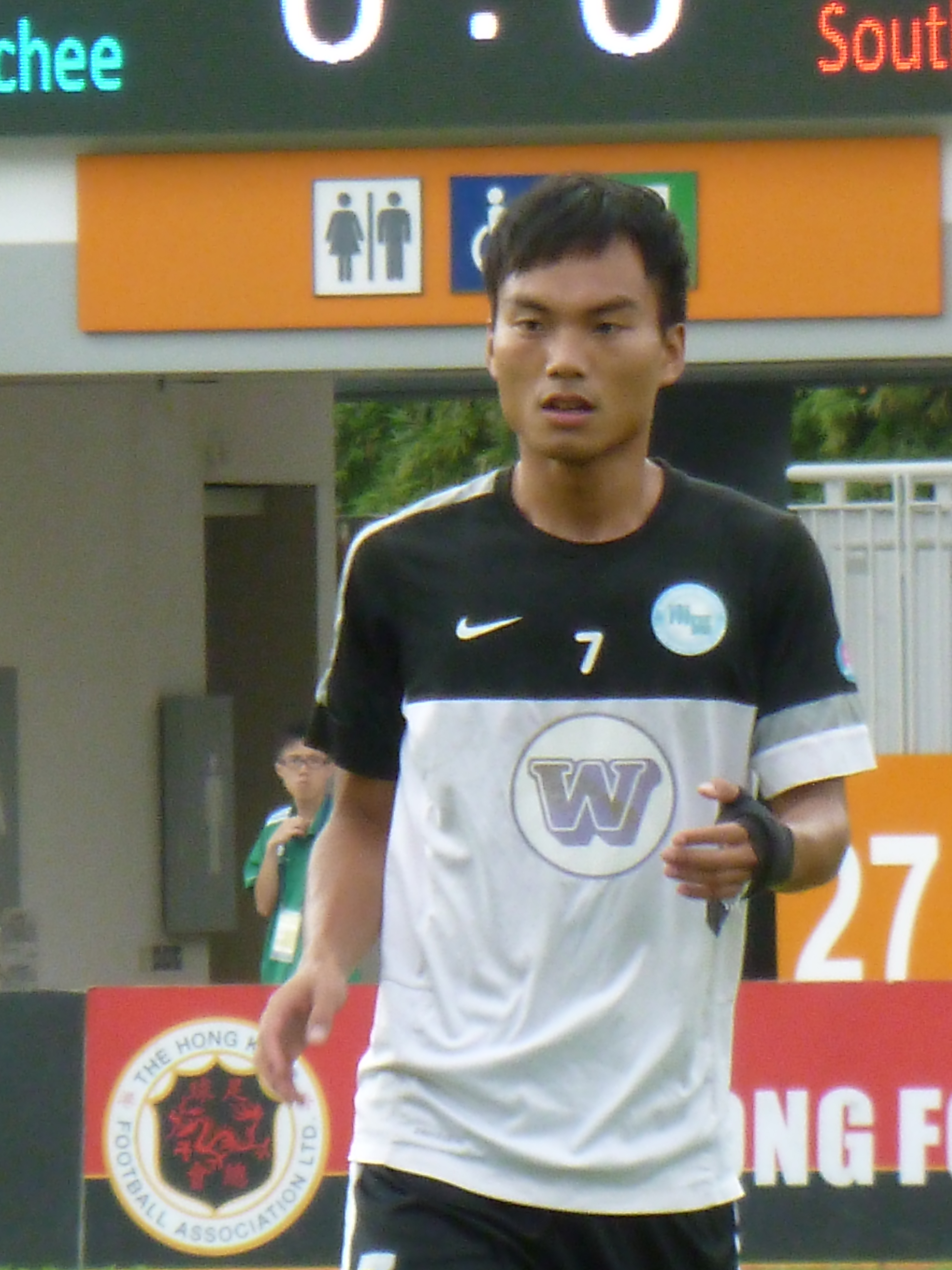

Personal information
- Full name: Chow Ka Wa
- Date of birth: 23 April 1986 (age 40)
- Place of birth: British Hong Kong
- Height: 1.77 m (5 ft 10 in)
- Position: Right midfielder

Youth career
- Rangers (HKG)

Senior career*
| Years | Team | Apps | (Gls) |
| 2004–2005 | Citizen | 0 | (0) |
| 2005 | → Xiangxue Pharmaceutical (loan) | 2 | (0) |
| 2005–2006 | Kwun Tong | 7 | (2) |
| 2006–2007 | Hong Kong 08 | 12 | (0) |
| 2007–2010 | Shatin | 39 | (12) |
| 2010–2011 | Pontic | 21 | (5) |
| 2011–2015 | Southern | 72 | (13) |
| 2015 | Tai Po | 0 | (0) |
| 2015–2016 | Eastern District | 20 | (4) |
| 2016–2018 | Hoi King | 47 | (10) |
| 2018–2019 | Resources Capital | 19 | (5) |
| 2019–2025 | Eastern District | 63 | (6) |

International career
| 2003 | Hong Kong U-18 | | |
| 2004 | Hong Kong U-20 | | |
- * Club domestic league appearances and goals

Chow Ka Wa (Chinese: 鄒嘉華; Cantonese Yale: Jāu Gāwà ; born 23 April 1986) is a former Hong Kong professional footballer who played as a right midfielder.

== Club career ==
=== Citizen ===
Chow began his professional career at Citizen, a newly promoted First Division club, in the 2004–05 season. However, as a young player, he failed to compete for a place in the starting line-up and mostly played in the Senior Shield only.

==== Loan to Xiangxie Phar ====
During the season, Xiangxie Phar was rebuilt and players all left the club. To retain their presence in the league, six teams from the First Division league loaned their young players so that they could gain match experience. Chow was one of them who was loaned from Citizen. However, as he was still a student at that time, he failed to attend every training session and therefore was not given many match-playing chances. He returned to Citizen at the end of the season.

=== Kwun Tong ===
After spending a season in the top-tier division, he joined Third Division side Kwun Tong, as he had to focus on academic studies. Although he played most of the matches, he failed to help them gain promotion to the Second Division. He left the club at the end of the season.

=== Hong Kong 08 ===
Chow made a return to the First Division in the 2006–07 season, joining Hong Kong 08, which was formed by a team of young players to let them gain match experience before competing in the 2008 Olympics qualifiers. He was given plenty of match-playing chances although there were many wingers at the team. However, the club was relegated and was dissolved after the season.

Although many players and coaches joined newly promoted side Workable, Chow did not follow them and joined Third Division side Shatin, meaning he would miss the First Division for the second time.

=== Shatin ===
Chow joined Third Division side Shatin in the 2007–08 season. As a third-tier club, however, Shatin had many players with First Division playing experience, including Lee Wai Man, who was the most-capped Hong Kong national team player back then, Ng Yat Hoi, Kwok Yue Hung and so on. With an exceptionally strong squad in the league, Chow helped Shatin claim the league title without dropping any points in all 15 matches, meaning they had also gained promotion to the Second Division. At the same time, Shatin also won the Junior Shield title in the season.

Chow stayed at the club as Shatin were aiming at promotion to the First Division for the first time in club history. He continued to make a great impact in the team and eventually helped the club achieve their season goal as they claimed the league title with only one loss in 18 matches. On the other hand, Shatin successfully defended their Junior Shield title, defeating Sham Shai Po 2–0 in the final. Chow played 90 minutes in the match, providing one assist in the match.

He followed the team and made a second return to the First Division in the 2009–10 season. However, since Shatin bought several new players to strengthen their squad, Chow's match-playing chances were therefore reduced. Shatin failed to avoid relegation to the Second Division as they placed 2nd at the bottom of the league. Chow also left the club after the season.

=== Pontic ===
Chow made his third departure from the First Division as he joined Second Division side Pontic in the 2010–11 season. As a key member of the team, he only missed one game throughout the season, helping the club gain promotion to the First Division.

However, since Pontic failed to find sponsors, they lacked sufficient funds to run the club. As a result, Pontic announced they refused to promote to the First Division. Soon later, Pontic was punished and had their club qualification cancelled, meaning that they were not able to compete in every league and cup organised by the Hong Kong Football Association. Chow became a free agent afterwards.

=== Southern ===
Chow joined Second Division side Southern in the 2011–12 season. Under the coaching of Fung Hoi Man, Chow was a regular starter for the club, featuring in 20 league matches and scoring 2 goals. Southern successfully gained promotion to the First Division as they placed second in the league.

The 2012–13 season was a year of breakthrough for Chow, as his impressive performance and cooperation with fellow teammates Dieguito, Jonathan Carril and Ip Chung Long attracted people's attention. He made a great impact on Southern's 8-game unbeaten run in the league during the season. Unfortunately, Chow was injured in January and was forced to stay on the sidelines for two months.

On 20 April 2013, he scored the winning goal in the 68th minute after being substituted in the 60th minute against South China, not just helping the club to win 3–2, but also helping them to secure the league 4th place. This was also Chow's first game after his recovery from his injury. This goal became more important as Southern qualified for the 2013 Hong Kong AFC Cup play-offs by finishing fourth in the league, as Kitchee won the FA Cup on 11 May 2013 after they had secured a place in the play-offs by finishing second in the league.

== Career statistics ==
=== Club ===
As of 5 May 2013.

| Club | Season | Division | League | | Shield & FA Cup | | League Cup | | AFC Cup | | Others^{1} | | Total | |
| Club | Season | Division | Apps | Goals | Apps | Goals | Apps | Goals | Apps | Goals | Apps | Goals | Apps | Goals |
|---|---|---|---|---|---|---|---|---|---|---|---|---|---|---|
| Citizen | 2004–05 | First Division | 0 | 0 | 0 | 0 | 3 | 0 | N/A | N/A | — | — | 3 | 0 |
| Xiangxue Phar (loan) | 2004–05 | First Division | 2 | 0 | 1 | 0 | 0 | 0 | N/A | N/A | — | — | 3 | 0 |
| Citizen Total | | | 0 | 0 | 0 | 0 | 3 | 0 | 0 | 0 | 0 | 0 | 3 | 0 |
| Xiangxue Phar Total | | | 2 | 0 | 1 | 0 | 0 | 0 | 0 | 0 | 0 | 0 | 3 | 0 |
| Kwun Tong | 2005–06 | Third 'District' Division | 7 | 0 | 2 | 0 | —^{2} | —^{2} | N/A | N/A | — | — | 9 | 0 |
| Kwun Tong Total | | | 7 | 0 | 2 | 0 | 0 | 0 | 0 | 0 | 0 | 0 | 9 | 0 |
| Hong Kong 08 | 2006–07 | First Division | 12 | 0 | 1 | 0 | 4 | 0 | N/A | N/A | — | — | 17 | 0 |
| Hong Kong 08 Total | | | 12 | 0 | 1 | 0 | 4 | 0 | 0 | 0 | 0 | 0 | 17 | 0 |
| Shatin | 2007–08 | Third 'District' Division | 13 | 11 | 5 | 2 | —^{2} | —^{2} | N/A | N/A | — | — | 18 | 13 |
| Shatin | 2008–09 | Second Division | 14 | 1 | 6 | 1 | —^{2} | —^{2} | N/A | N/A | — | — | 20 | 2 |
| Shatin | 2009–10 | First Division | 12 | 0 | 1 | 0 | —^{3} | —^{3} | N/A | N/A | — | — | 13 | 0 |
| Shatin Total | | | 39 | 12 | 12 | 3 | 0 | 0 | 0 | 0 | 0 | 0 | 51 | 15 |
| Pontic | 2010–11 | Second Division | 21 | 5 | 3 | 1 | —^{2} | —^{2} | N/A | N/A | — | — | 24 | 6 |
| Pontic Total | | | 21 | 5 | 3 | 1 | 0 | 0 | 0 | 0 | 0 | 0 | 24 | 6 |
| Southern | 2011–12 | Second Division | 20 | 2 | 2 | 2 | —^{2} | —^{3} | N/A | N/A | — | — | 22 | 4 |
| Southern | 2012–13 | First Division | 11 | 2 | 5 | 1 | —^{3} | —^{3} | N/A | N/A | 0 | 0 | 16 | 3 |
| Southern Total | | | 31 | 4 | 7 | 3 | 0 | 0 | 0 | 0 | 0 | 0 | 38 | 7 |
| Hong Kong Total | | | 112 | 21 | 26 | 7 | 7 | 0 | 0 | 0 | 0 | 0 | 145 | 28 |

Remarks:
^{1} Others include 2013 Hong Kong AFC Cup play-offs.
^{2} Hong Kong League Cup only consists of top-tier division clubs.
^{3} Hong Kong League Cup was not held in the 2009–10 and 2012–13 seasons.
