= Lee Sze Ho =

Hong Kong footballer (born 1986)

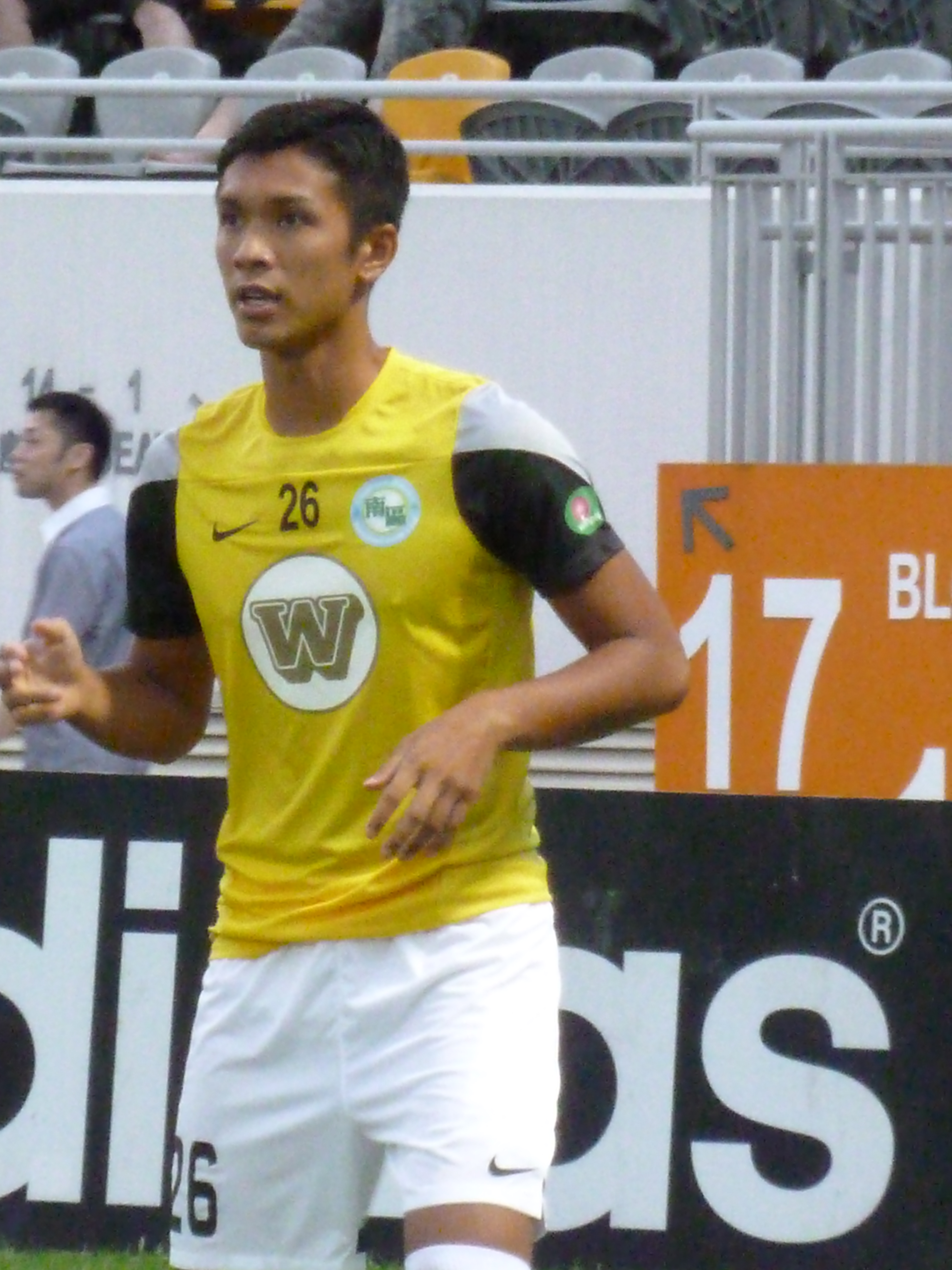

Personal information
- Full name: Lee Sze Ho
- Date of birth: 15 July 1986 (age 40)
- Place of birth: Hong Kong
- Height: 1.76 m (5 ft 9 in)
- Position: Centre-back

Youth career
- Kwai Tsing

Senior career*
Years	Team	Apps	(Gls)
2005–2006	Kwai Tsing	21	(0)
2006–2007	Hong Kong 08	6	(0)
2007–2010	Shatin	25	(2)
2010–2011	Pontic	3	(0)
2011–2014	Southern	31	(4)
2014–2015	Yau Tsim Mong	10	(0)
2015–2017	Sun Hei	50	(4)
2017–2018	Double Flower	21	(5)
2018–2023	Eastern District	72	(6)
2023–2024	Sai Kung	18	(1)
2024–2025	Supreme	18	(3)
2025–2026	Citizen	19	(1)
- * Club domestic league appearances and goals as of 16 May 2026

Lee Sze Ho (Chinese: 李思豪; Jyutping: lei^{5} si^{1} hou^{4}; born 15 July 1986) is a former Hong Kong professional footballer who played as a defender.

== Club career ==
=== Kwai Tsing ===
Lee started his football career at Kwai Tsing. However, he left the club after the 2005–06 season.

=== Hong Kong 08 ===
Lee joined First Division club Hong Kong 08 in the summer of 2006.

=== Shatin ===
He joined Third Division club Shatin after spending a season at Hong Kong 08. He was one of the key members at the club to lead them gain promotion to First Division in two years.

=== Mutual ===
Lee joined Second Division club Pontic in 2010 summer, following former Shatin coach Lee Wai Man. The club successfully gained promotion to the First Division at the end of the season, but they refused to promote and thus were knocked out from the Hong Kong league system. Thus, Lee became a free agent.

=== Southern ===
Lee joined Second Division club Southern on a free transfer. His arrival had a great influence, as he led the club to gain promotion to the First Division for the first time in club history.

== Career statistics ==
=== Club ===
As of 13 May 2013

Club	Season	Division	League		Senior Shield		League Cup		FA Cup		AFC Cup		Others^{1}		Total	
Club	Season	Division	Apps	Goals	Apps	Goals	Apps	Goals	Apps	Goals	Apps	Goals	Apps	Goals	Apps	Goals
Kwai Tsing	2005–06	Second Division	21	0	2^{2}	0^{2}	N/A	N/A	N/A	N/A	N/A	N/A	N/A	N/A	23	0
Kwai Tsing Total			21	0	2	0	0	0	0	0	0	0	0	0	23	0
Hong Kong 08	2006–07	First Division	6	0	1	0	0	0	0	0	N/A	N/A	N/A	N/A	7	0
Hong Kong 08 Total			6	0	1	0	0	0	0	0	0	0	0	0	7	0
Shatin	2007–08	Third 'District' Division	13	1	3^{2}	0^{2}	N/A	N/A	N/A	N/A	N/A	N/A	N/A	N/A	16	1
Shatin	2008–09	Second Division	9	1	5^{2}	1^{2}	N/A	N/A	0	0	N/A	N/A	N/A	N/A	14	2
Shatin	2009–10	First Division	3	0	0	0	—	—	0	0	N/A	N/A	N/A	N/A	3	0
Shatin Total			25	2	8	1	0	0	0	0	0	0	0	0	33	3
Pontic	2010–11	Second Division	4	0	0^{2}	0^{2}	N/A	N/A	N/A	N/A	N/A	N/A	N/A	N/A	4	0
Pontic Total			4	0	0	0	0	0	0	0	0	0	0	0	4	0
Southern	2011–12	Second Division	19	4	1^{2}	0^{2}	N/A	N/A	N/A	N/A	N/A	N/A	N/A	N/A	20	4
Southern	2012–13	First Division	11	0	2	0	—	—	1	0	N/A	N/A	1	0	15	0
Southern	2013–14	First Division	0	0	0	0	—	—	0	0	N/A	N/A	N/A	N/A	0	0
Southern Total			30	4	3	0	0	0	1	0	0	0	1	0	35	4
Total			86	6	14	1	0	0	1	0	0	0	1	0	102	7

== Notes ==
1. Others include Hong Kong Third Division Champion Play-off.
2. Since these clubs were competing in lower divisions, they could only join the Junior Shield instead of Senior Shield.
