= Héctor Granado =

Spanish footballer

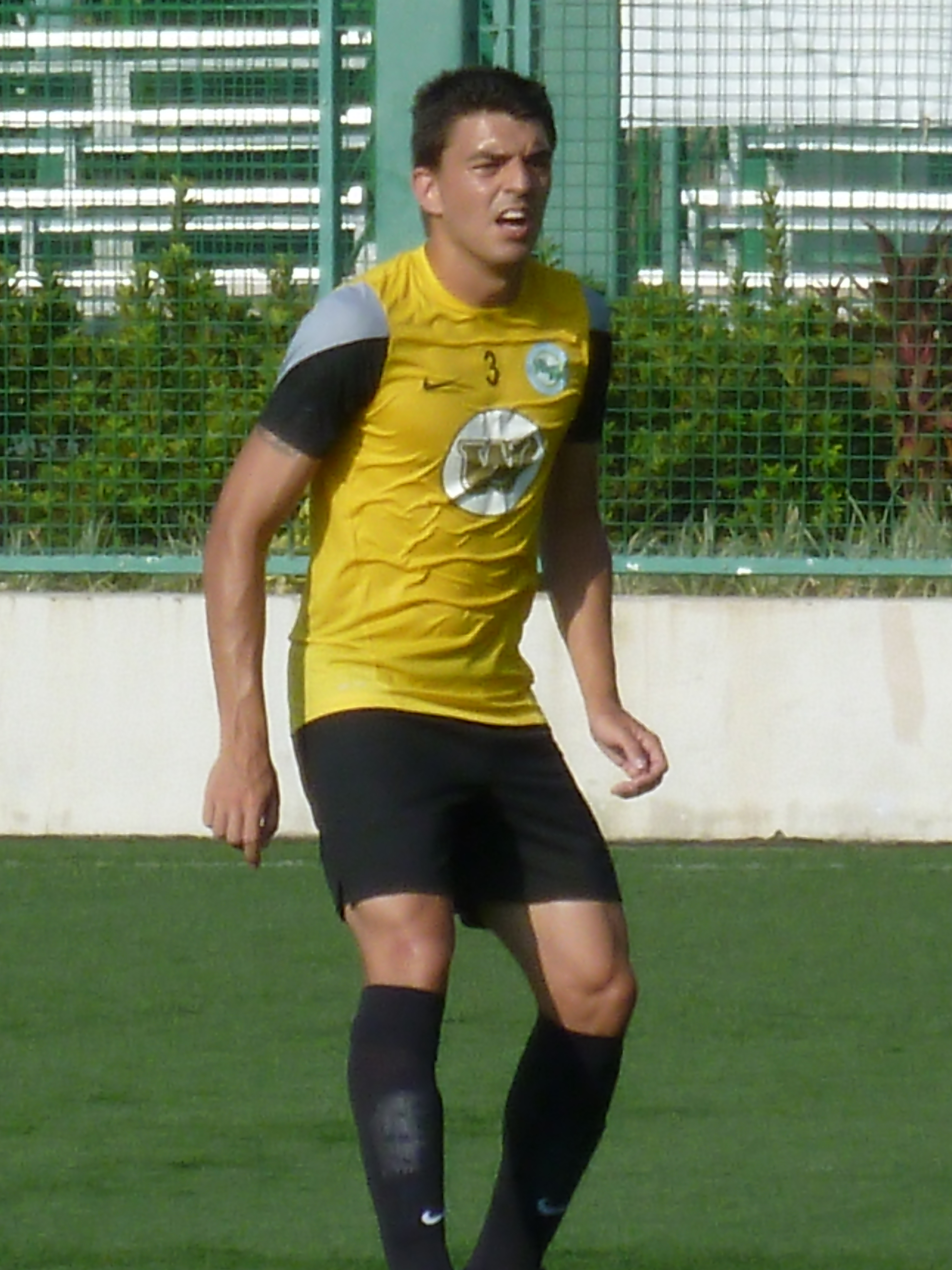

Personal information
- Full name: Héctor Granado Gómez
- Date of birth: 20 March 1987 (age 39)
- Place of birth: Valladolid, Spain
- Height: 1.81 m (5 ft 11 in)
- Position: Defender

Youth career
- 2005–2006: Valladolid

Senior career*
Years	Team	Apps	(Gls)
2006–2008	Valladolid B	54	(1)
2008–2009	Deportivo B	26	(1)
2009–2013	Palencia	98	(1)
2013–2014	Southern	17	(0)
2014–2017	Palencia Balompié	92	(1)
- * Club domestic league appearances and goals as of 18 December 2016

Héctor Granado Gómez (Chinese: 域陀; born 20 March 1987), sometimes known simply as Héctor, is a Spanish professional footballer who plays as a left back or a central defender.

== Club career ==
Granado was born in Valladolid, Castile and León. In his country he never played in higher than Segunda División B, representing in that level Real Valladolid B, Deportivo de La Coruña B and CF Palencia. At the end of the 2011–12 season, he suffered relegation with the latter club.

On 1 June 2013, Hong Kong First Division League side Southern District RSA announced the signing of free agent Granado. He returned to Spain the following year after joining CD Palencia Balompié, being released in January 2017.

== Club statistics ==
As of 2 June 2014

Club performance			League		Cup		League Cup		Europe		Other		Total	
Club	Season	Division	Apps	Goals	Apps	Goals	Apps	Goals	Apps	Goals	Apps	Goals	Apps	Goals
Spain			League		Copa del Rey		–		Continental		Others^{1}		Total	
Valladolid B	2006–07	Segunda División B	22	0	0	0	—	—	0	0	2	0	22	0
Valladolid B	2007–08	Segunda División B	32	1	0	0	—	—	0	0	0	0	32	1
Valladolid B Total			54	1	0	0	0	0	0	0	2	0	56	1
Deportivo B	2008–09	Segunda División B	26	1	0	0	—	—	0	0	0	0	26	1
Deportivo B Total			26	1	0	0	0	0	0	0	2	0	26	1
Palencia	2009–10	Segunda División B	31	1	0	0	—	—	0	0	2	0	33	1
Palencia	2010–11	Segunda División B	22	0	0	0	—	—	0	0	0	0	22	0
Palencia	2011–12	Segunda División B	29	0	0	0	—	—	0	0	2	0	31	0
Palencia	2012–13	Tercera División	16	0	0	0	—	—	0	0	0	0	16	0
Palencia Total			98	1	0	0	0	0	0	0	4	0	102	1
Spain Total			178	3	0	0	0	0	0	0	6	0	184	3
Hong Kong			League		Shield & FA Cup		League Cup		Asian		Others^{2}		Total	
Southern	2013–14	First Division	17	0	4	0	—	—	N/A	N/A	1	0	22	0
Southern Total			17	0	4	0	0	0	0	0	1	0	22	0
Hong Kong Total			17	0	4	0	0	0	0	0	1	0	22	0
Career Total			195	3	4	0	0	0	0	0	7	0	206	3

Remarks:
^{1}It includes Segunda División promotion play-offs and Segunda División B promotion play-offs.
^{2}It includes 2012–13 Hong Kong season play-offs.
