= Lee Yang Xuan =

Hong Kong footballer (born 1995)

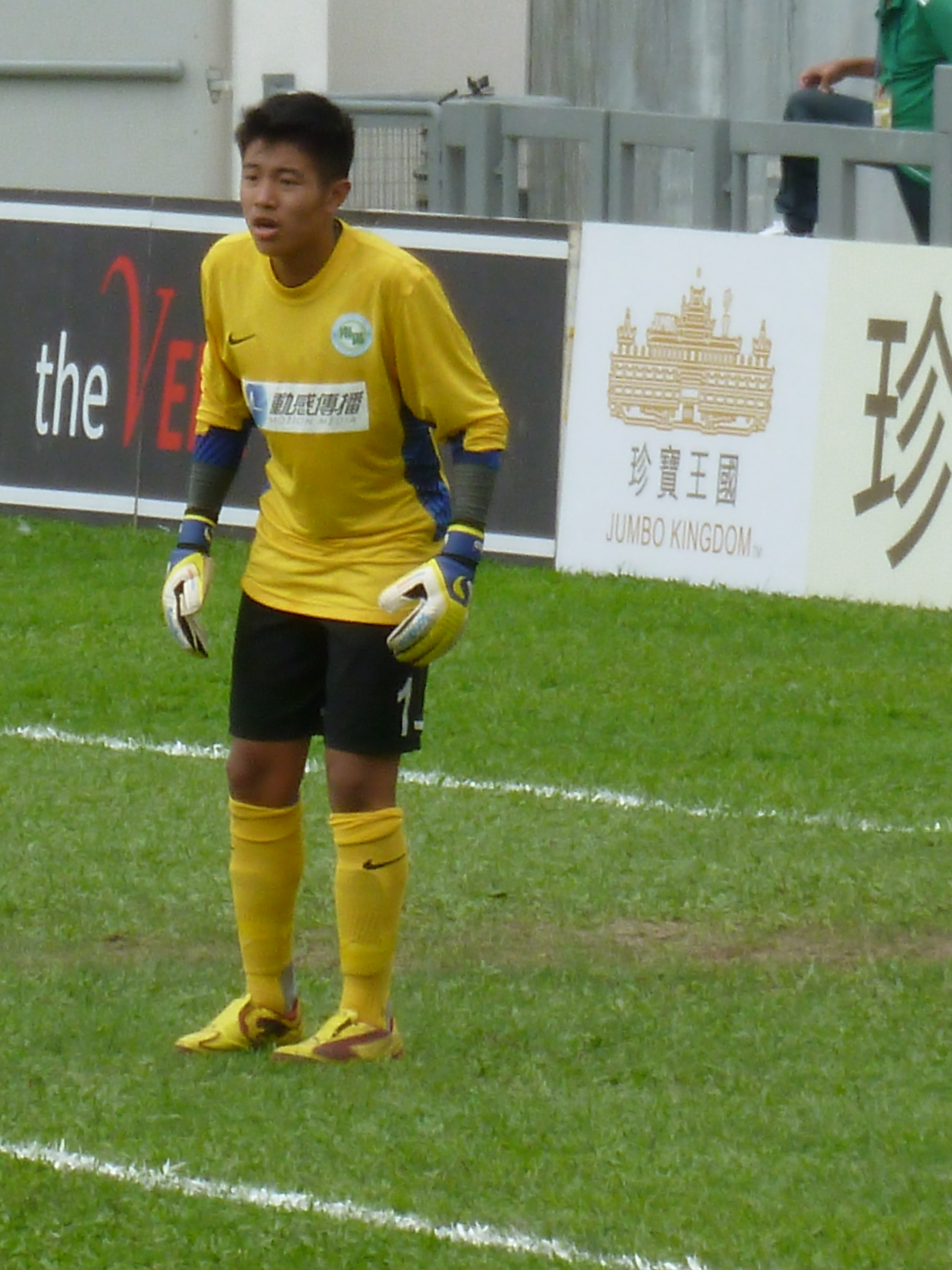

Personal information
- Full name: Lee Yang Xuan
- Date of birth: 27 October 1995 (age 31)
- Place of birth: Hong Kong
- Height: 1.69 m (5 ft 7 in)
- Position: Goalkeeper

Youth career
- 2011–2012: Kitchee
- 2012–2014: Southern

Senior career*
Years	Team	Apps	(Gls)
2012–2014	Southern	0	(0)
2014–2015	Double Flower	14	(0)
2015–2017	Wing Yee	32	(0)
2017–2018	Wan Chai	11	(0)
2018–2019	Kwong Wah	5	(1)
2022–2023	Lung Moon		
- * Club domestic league appearances and goals

Lee Yang Xuan
- Traditional Chinese: 李陽軒
Transcriptions
Standard Mandarin
- Hanyu Pinyin: Lǐ Yángxuān
Yue: Cantonese
- Jyutping: lei^{5} joeng^{4} hin^{1}

Lee Yang-xuan (Chinese: 李陽軒 (born 27 October 1995 in Hong Kong), is a Hong Kong former footballer who played as a goalkeeper.

== Club career ==
=== Early career ===
Studying at The Chinese Foundation Secondary School, Lee was a member of Kitchee reserves in the 2011–12 season. He joined Southern youth team in the 2012–13 season.

=== Southern ===
Due to the departure of first choice goalkeeper Diego Jose Gomez Heredia, Southern head coach Fung Hoi Man invited Leeto train with first team. He spent whole season on the bench, except the final match of the season against Kitchee of the Hong Kong season play-offs semi-finals on 19 May 2013. Lee started in the match due to the injury of first choice Chiu Yu Ming. He conceded two goals and the team lost 0–2 to end the season.

In the 2013–14 season, Lee's squad number has changed from 1 to 37.

== Career statistics ==
As of 23 June 2013

Club	Season	Division	League			Cup			Continental			Total		
Club	Season	Division	Apps	G.C.	C.S.	Apps	G.C.	C.S.	Apps	G.C.	C.S.	Apps	G.C.	C.S.
Southern	2012–13	First Division	0	0	0	1	2	0	N/A	N/A	N/A	1	2	0
Southern	2013–14	First Division	0	0	0	0	0	0	N/A	N/A	N/A	0	0	0
Southern Total			0	0	0	1	2	0	0	0	0	1	2	0
Career Total			0	0	0	1	2	0	0	0	0	1	2	0
