= Che Runqiu =

Hong Kong footballer

Che Runqiu 車潤秋
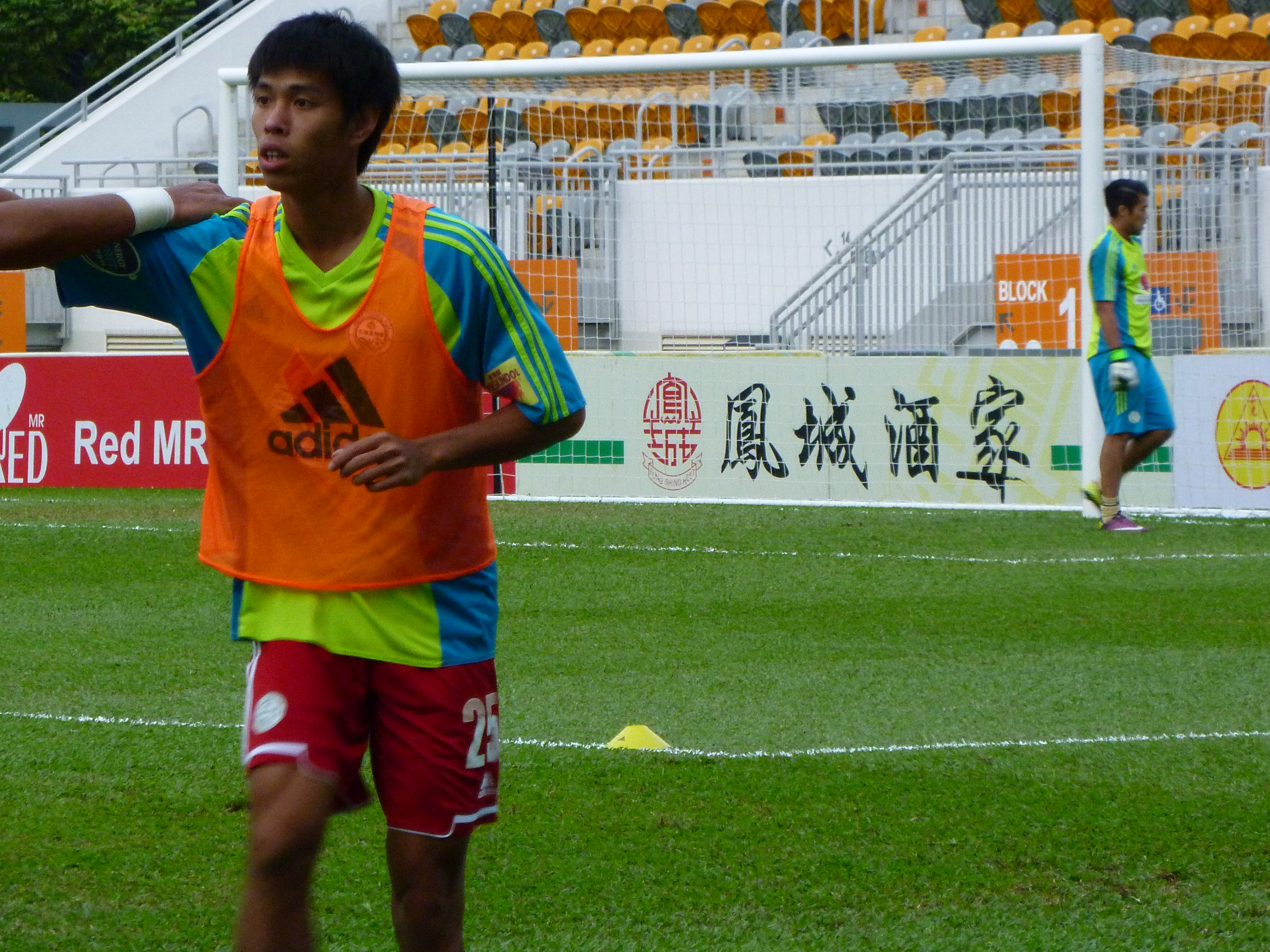

Personal information
- Full name: Che Runqiu
- Date of birth: 25 October 1990 (age 36)
- Place of birth: Guangzhou, China
- Height: 1.78 m (5 ft 10 in)
- Positions: Midfielder; defender

Youth career
- Guangzhou GPC

Senior career*
Years	Team	Apps	(Gls)
2007–2009	Panyu Pearl		
2009–2013	Tai Po	45	(0)
2013–2014	Southern	19	(0)
2014–2017	South China	20	(0)
2016	→ Tai Po (loan)	5	(0)
2017–2019	Southern	29	(0)
2019–2020	Tai Po	8	(1)
2020–2021	Ka I		
2021	Monte Carlo		
2021–2024	GD Red Treasure		
2024	GX Bushan		
2024–2025	WSE	22	(0)
2026–	Fu Moon	8	(2)

International career
2011–2012	Hong Kong U20		
- * Club domestic league appearances and goals as of 31 May 2026

Che Runqiu (Chinese: 車潤秋; pinyin: Chē Rùnqiū; Cantonese Yale: Chē Yeuhnchāu ; born 25 October 1990) is a former professional footballer who played as a defender. Born in China, he represented Hong Kong internationally.

== Club career ==
Che joined Hong Kong First Division club Tai Po in 2009. He started developed as a regular first team member in the 2011–12 season as he featured a total of 19 matches in the season. Che joined fellow First Division club Southern on 21 June 2013.

On 11 July 2017, Southern announced via Facebook that they had brought back Che.

On 29 July 2019, Che returned to Tai Po on a permanent basis.

== International career ==
On 21 June 2013, Che was selected into the 28-men Hong Kong under-23 training squad for the 2013 East Asian Cup.

== Career statistics ==
=== Club ===
As of 5 May 2013.

Club	Season	Division	League		Shield & FA Cup		League Cup		AFC Cup		Others^{1}		Total	
Club	Season	Division	Apps	Goals	Apps	Goals	Apps	Goals	Apps	Goals	Apps	Goals	Apps	Goals
NT Reality Wofoo Tai Po	2009–10	First Division	4	0	0	0	—	—	0	0	N/A	N/A	4	0
NT Reality Wofoo Tai Po	2010–11	First Division	8	0	1	0	1	0	—	—	N/A	N/A	10	0
Wofoo Tai Po	2011–12	First Division	15	0	3	0	1	0	—	—	N/A	N/A	19	0
Wofoo Tai Po	2012–13	First Division	18	0	10	0	—	—	—	—	1	0	29	0
Tai Po Total			45	0	14	0	2	0	0	0	1	0	62	0
Southern	2013–14	First Division	0	0	0	0	—	—	—	—	N/A	N/A	0	0
Southern Total			0	0	0	0	0	0	0	0	0	0	0	0
Career Total			45	0	14	0	2	0	0	0	1	0	62	0

^{1} Others include Hong Kong season play-offs.

== Honors ==
=== Club ===
Tai Po

- Hong Kong Senior Shield: 2012–13
