= Ha Shing Chi =

Hong Kong former footballer (born 1982)

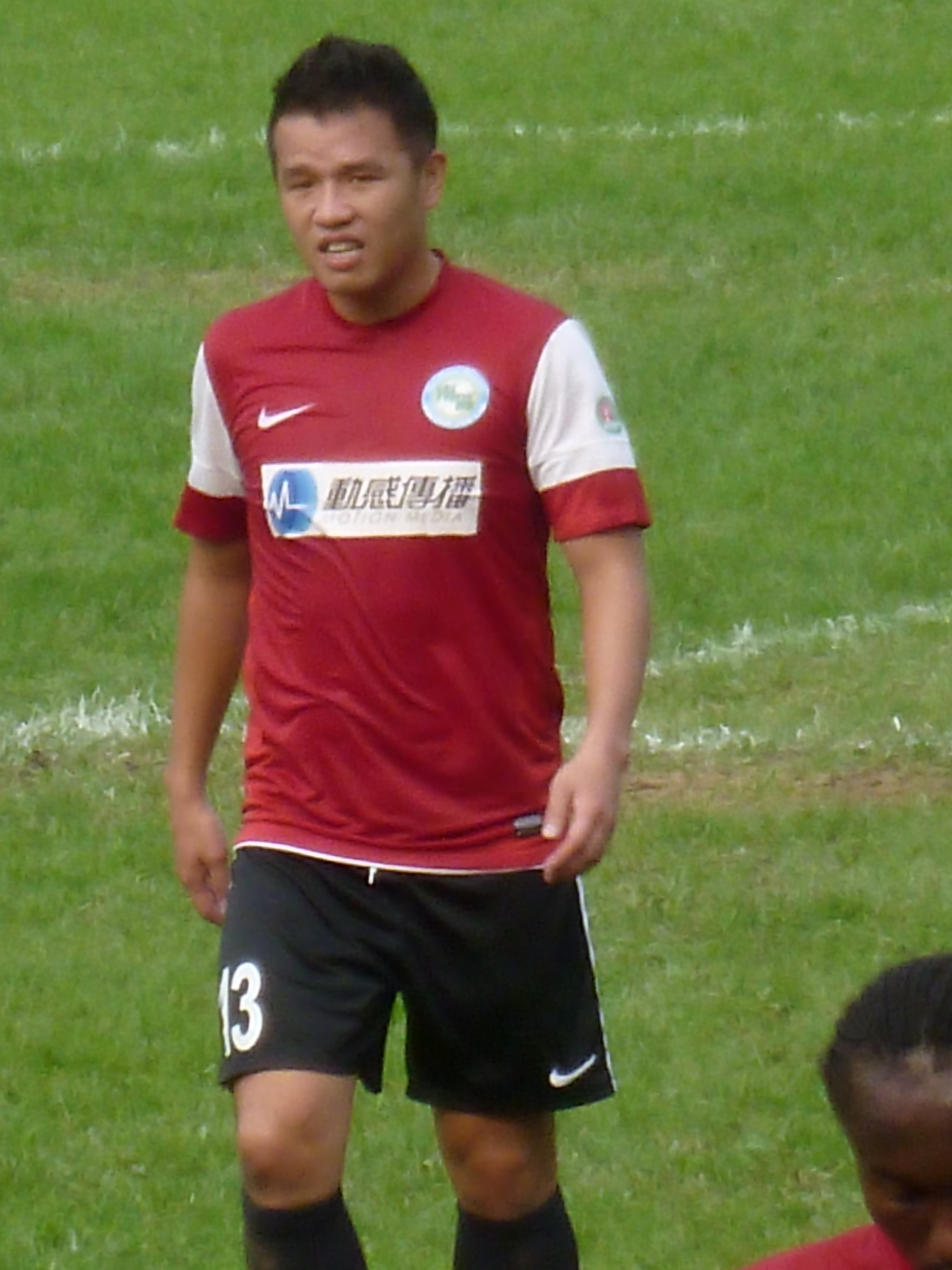

Personal information
- Full name: Ha Shing Chi
- Date of birth: 30 May 1982 (age 44)
- Place of birth: Hong Kong
- Height: 1.77 m (5 ft 10 in)
- Position: Left back

Youth career
- 1997–2003: South China

Senior career*
Years	Team	Apps	(Gls)
2003–2006	South China	3	(0)
2006–2007	Lucky Mile	7	(0)
2007–2008	Kwok Keung	14	(0)
2008–2009	Tuen Mun Progoal	16	(0)
2009–2010	Happy Valley	3	(0)
2010–2015	Southern	20	(0)
2015–2017	Wan Chai	69	(10)
2017–2018	Hoi King	6	(0)
2018–2020	Resources Capital	33	(1)
- * Club domestic league appearances and goals

Ha Shing Chi (Chinese: 哈成智; Jyutping: haa^{1} sing^{4} zi^{3} ; born 30 May 1982) is a Hong Kong former professional footballer who played as a left back.

== Club career ==
=== South China ===
Ha Shing Chi joined South China youth team in 1997 and was promoted to the first team in 2003.

Although he was promoted to the first team, he did not have too many match-play chances until the 2004–05 season as South China refused to use any foreign players. On the other hand, when Ha was studying at the City University of Hong Kong, he represented its football team, helping the team to claim the champions of Hong Kong University Football League in 2005 by defeating Chinese University of Hong Kong in the final. He was also crowned the Most Valuable Player of the match.

However, he only featured in one FA Cup match during the 2005–06 season, As the club promised to strengthen the squad in the following season after their request to remain in the First Division was approved, Ha was released by the club.

=== Playing in the Second Division ===
After being released by South China in 2006, he joined Second Division club Lucky Mile as a semi-professional player. He joined another Second Division club Kwok Keung in the next season.

=== Tuen Mun Progoal ===
Ha returned to the top-tier division campaign as he joined First Division club Tuen Mun Progoal in the 2008–09 season. He was one of the key members and featured in most of the matches. His great performance attracted Happy Valley, which Ha joined after the season.

=== Happy Valley ===
Ha joined fellow First Division club Happy Valley in the 2009–10 season. However, he only featured three league matches throughout the season. Happy Valley was also relegated after the season. He left the club eventually.

=== Southern ===
Ha returned to the second-tier division and joined the newly promoted side Southern. In the first season, he helped the team to win the champions of Junior Shield by scoring the winning 2–1 goal in the 63rd minute. He opted to stay at the club after the season.

As the club's left back first choice, he helped the club gain promotion to the First Division for the first in club history as Southern placed second in the league table. This also meant Ha's second return to the First Division.

In the 2012–13 season, he did not feature the first five Southern matches. As the club wished to improve their defence, Ha started in Southern's sixth match against South China, and the match eventually ended with a goalless draw. Given Ha's impressive performance, he became the usual left back starter in the following matches, not just having done defensive work, but also often providing freekick assists. He has been selected to the Team of the Week twice in the season.

== Personal life ==
Ha Shing Chi, along with his elder brother, are charged by the Independent Commission Against Corruption (Hong Kong) for alleged accepting and offering over HK$328,000 in illegal commissions respectively in relation to the trading in securities.

== Career statistics ==
=== Club ===
As of 5 May 2013. The following table does not include stats in the 2003–04 and 2004–05 seasons.

Club	Season	Division	League		Shield & FA Cup		League Cup		AFC Cup		Others^{1}		Total	
Club	Season	Division	Apps	Goals	Apps	Goals	Apps	Goals	Apps	Goals	Apps	Goals	Apps	Goals
South China	2005–06	First Division	0	0	1	0	0	0	N/A	N/A	0	0	1	0
South China Total			0	0	1	0	0	0	0	0	0	0	1	0
Lucky Mile	2006–07	Second Division	7	0	1	0	—^{2}	—^{2}	N/A	N/A	0	0	8	0
Lucky Mile Total			7	0	1	0	0	0	0	0	0	0	8	0
Kwok Keung	2007–08	Second Division	14	0	0	0	—^{2}	—^{2}	N/A	N/A	0	0	14	0
Kwok Keung Total			14	0	0	0	0	0	0	0	0	0	14	0
Tuen Mun Progoal	2008–09	First Division	16	0	0	0	1	0	N/A	N/A	0	0	17	0
Tuen Mun Progoal Total			16	0	0	0	1	0	0	0	0	0	17	0
Happy Valley	2009–10	First Division	3	0	0	0	—^{3}	—^{3}	N/A	N/A	0	0	3	0
Happy Valley Total			3	0	0	0	0	0	0	0	0	0	3	0
Southern	2010–11	Second Division	21	8	5	4	—^{2}	—^{2}	N/A	N/A	0	0	26	12
Southern	2011–12	Second Division	21	2	2	0	—^{2}	—^{2}	N/A	N/A	0	0	23	2
Southern	2012–13	First Division	11	0	4	0	—^{3}	—^{3}	N/A	N/A	0	0	15	0
Southern Total			53	10	11	4	0	0	0	0	0	0	64	14
Hong Kong Total			93	10	13	4	1	0	0	0	0	0	107	14

Remarks:
^{1} Others include 2013 Hong Kong AFC Cup play-offs.
^{2} Hong Kong League Cup only consists of top-tier division clubs.
^{3} Hong Kong League Cup was not held in the 2009–10 and 2012–13 seasons.
