= Chiu Yu Ming =

Hong Kong footballer

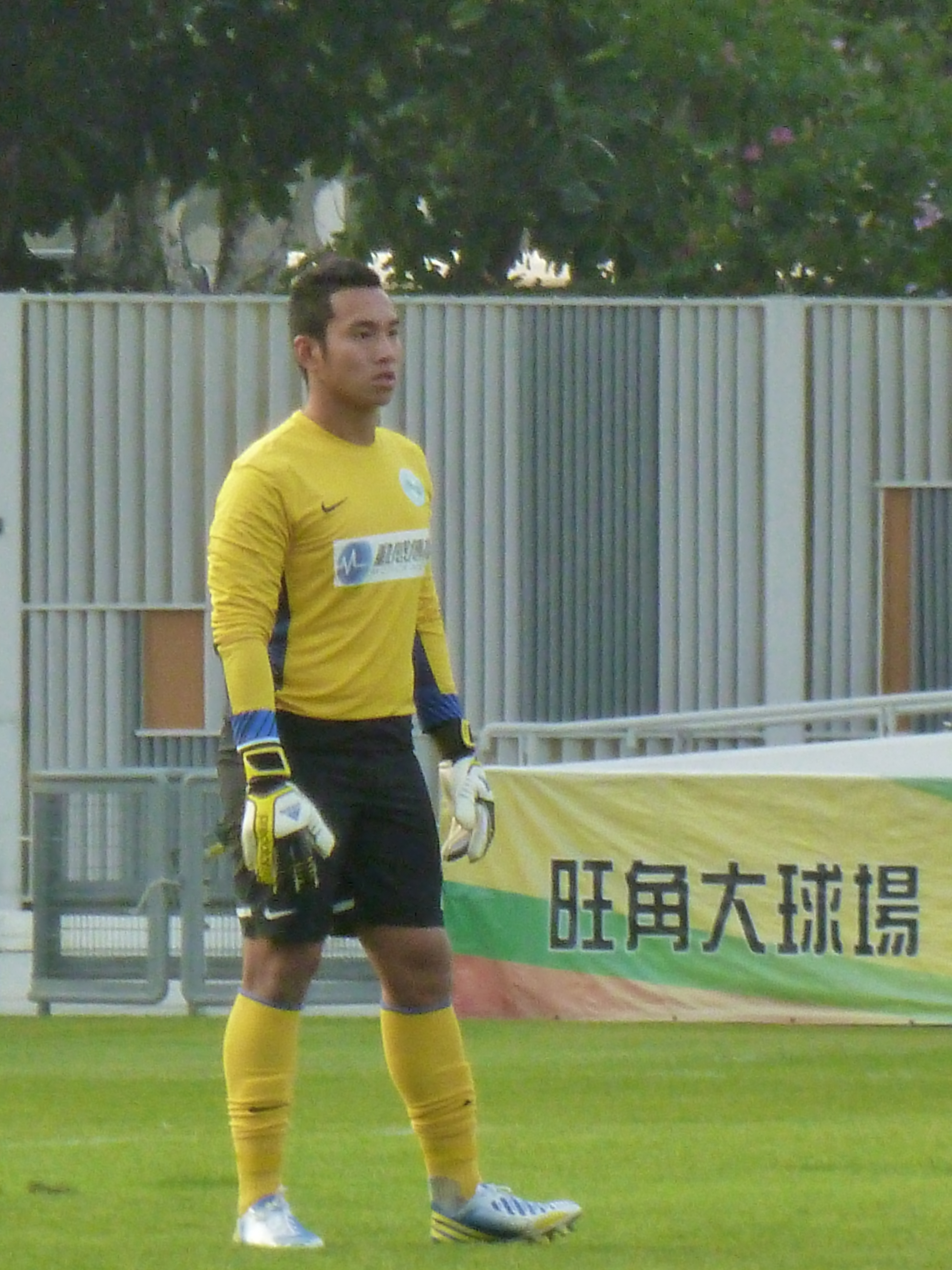
- Chiu Yu Ming in 2013

Personal information
- Full name: Chiu Yu Ming
- Date of birth: 9 November 1991 (age 34)
- Place of birth: Hong Kong
- Height: 1.75 m (5 ft 9 in)
- Position: Goalkeeper

Youth career
- Tai Po

Senior career*
Years	Team	Apps	(Gls)
2010–2012	Tai Po	3	(0)
2011–2012	→ Hong Kong Sapling (loan)	11	(0)
2012–2014	Southern	32	(0)
2014–2015	YFCMD	14	(0)
2015–2016	Yuen Long	14	(0)
2016–2017	Hong Kong Rangers	12	(0)
2017–2018	Hoi King	8	(0)
2019–2020	Hoi King	11	(0)
2020–2025	Hoi King	25	(0)

International career
2012–2013	Hong Kong U-23		
- * Club domestic league appearances and goals as of 6 May 2017

Chiu Yu Ming (Chinese: 邱于銘; Cantonese Yale: Yāu Yūmìng ; born 9 November 1991 in Hong Kong), is a former Hong Kong professional footballer who played as a goalkeeper.

== Club career ==
=== Tai Po ===
Chiu joined Tai Po youth system and was promoted to the first team in the 2010–11 season, serving as the backup of Pang Tsz Kin.

=== Hong Kong Sapling ===
In the 2011–12 season, as Mutual refused to promote to the top-tier division, a team of youth players formed Hong Kong Sapling. Chiu was loaned to the team and originally served as a backup of Tsang Man Fai. However, due to the departure of Tsang Man Fai, he became the first-choice goalkeeper. He returned to Tai Po after the season.

=== Southern ===
Chiu joined newly promoted First Division club Southern for an undisclosed fee.

== International career ==
On 19 June 2012, Chiu was called up into the final squad for the 2013 AFC U-22 Asian Cup qualification in Laos. However, he did not feature any matches as Tsang Man Fai played every match.

On 21 June 2013, Chiu was again chosen into the training squad for the 2013 East Asian Games.

== Career statistics ==
=== Club ===
As of 23 June 2013

Club	Season	Division	League			Cup			Continental			Total		
Club	Season	Division	Apps	G.C.	C.S.	Apps	G.C.	C.S.	Apps	G.C.	C.S.	Apps	G.C.	C.S.
NT Realty Wofoo Tai Po	2010–11	First Division	3	4	0	1	3	0	N/A	N/A	N/A	4	7	0
NT Realty Wofoo Tai Po	2011–12	First Division	0	0	0	0	0	0	N/A	N/A	N/A	0	0	0
Hong Kong Sapling (loan)	2011–12	First Division	11	33	0	5	12	1	N/A	N/A	N/A	16	45	1
Tai Po Total			3	4	0	1	3	0	0	0	0	4	7	0
Hong Kong Sapling Total			11	33	0	5	12	1	0	0	0	16	45	1
Southern	2012–13	First Division	16	21	5	6	8	2	N/A	N/A	N/A	22	29	7
Southern	2013–14	First Division	0	0	0	0	0	0	N/A	N/A	N/A	0	0	0
Southern Total			16	21	5	6	8	2	0	0	0	22	29	7
Career Total			30	58	5	12	23	3	0	0	0	42	81	8
