= Tsang Man Fai =

Hong Kong footballer (born 1991)

Tsang Man Fai 曾文輝
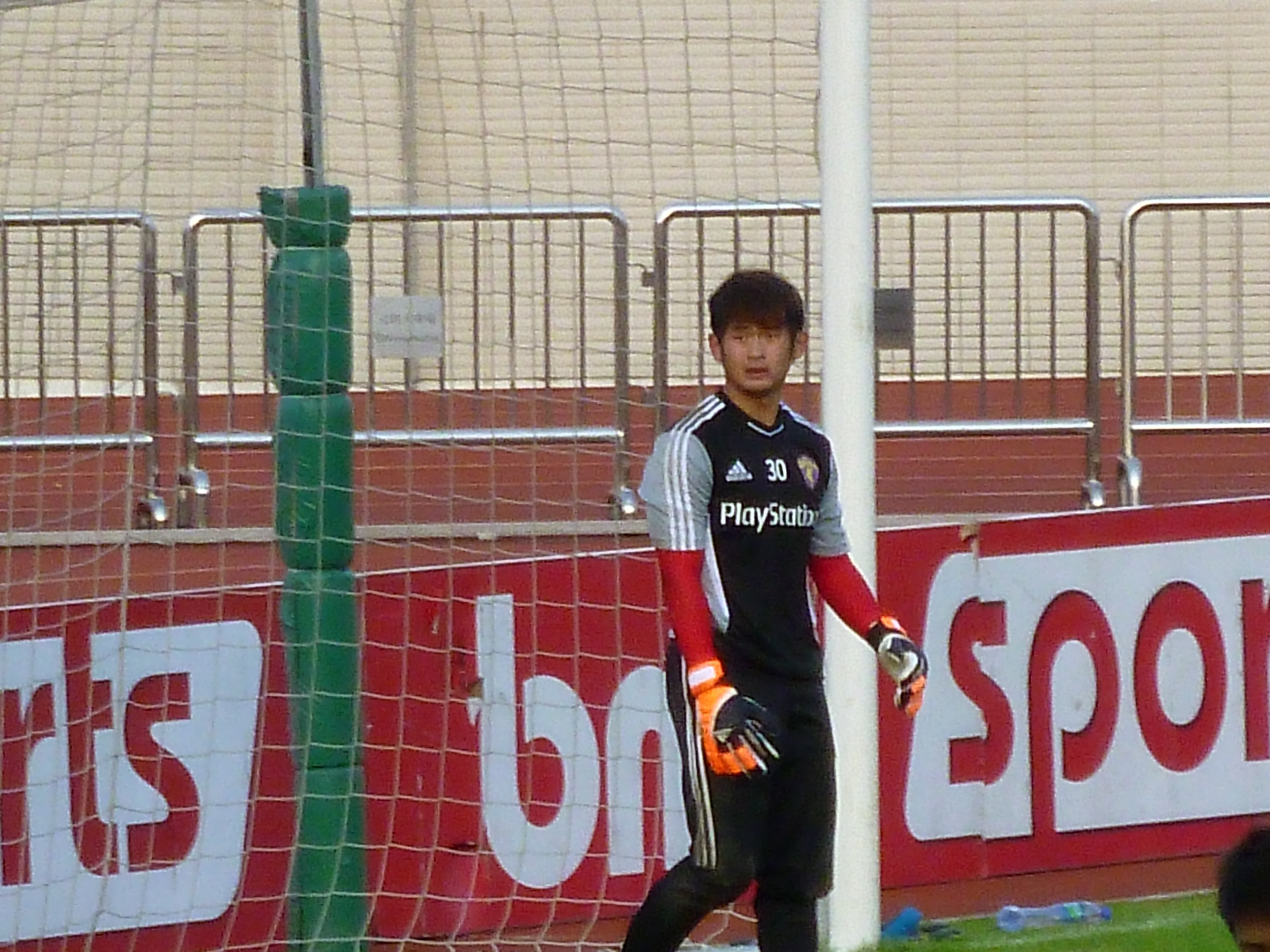

Personal information
- Full name: Tsang Man Fai
- Date of birth: 2 August 1991 (age 35)
- Place of birth: Hong Kong
- Height: 1.78 m (5 ft 10 in)
- Position: Goalkeeper

Senior career*
Years	Team	Apps	(Gls)
2009–2012	Fourway Rangers	1	(1)
2011–2012	→ Hong Kong Sapling (loan)	6	(0)
2012	→ Pegasus (loan)	2	(0)
2012–2013	Yokohama FC Hong Kong	14	(0)
2013–2017	South China	21	(0)
2013–2014	→ Southern (loan)	2	(0)
2015–2016	→ Wong Tai Sin (loan)	13	(0)
2017–2019	Tai Po	19	(0)
2019–2021	Eastern	2	(0)

International career^{‡}
2009	Hong Kong U-19	4	(0)
- * Club domestic league appearances and goals as of 1 July 2021 ‡ National team caps and goals as of 4 June 2016

Tsang Man Fai (Chinese: 曾文輝; Jyutping: zang^{1} man^{4} fai^{1}, born 2 August 1991) is a Hong Kong former professional footballer who played as a goalkeeper.

== Club career ==
=== Rangers ===
Tsang had his first professional appearance on 19 February 2011, which was a Hong Kong First Division League match Pegasus versus Fourway Rangers. He scored a goal in the penalty area of his team and assisted his teammate Makhosonke Bhengu to score the winning goal in his first professional match.

=== Pegasus ===
He was loaned to Pegasus in January 2012.

=== Yokohama FC Hong Kong ===
During the summer of 2012, Tsang joined fellow First Division club Yokohama FC Hong Kong.

=== South China ===
On 28 June 2013, Tsang joined defending champions South China after spending a season at Yokohama FC Hong Kong. He is given jersey number 1 which was previously worn by Yapp Hung Fai, who left South China and joined Chinese Super League club Guizhou Renhe.

=== Southern ===
On 6 August 2013, Tsang was loaned to fellow First Division club Southern as Yapp's transfer fell through.

=== Tai Po ===
Following South China's decision to self-relegate, Tsang found work with another HKPL club, signing a contract with Tai Po.

=== Eastern ===
On 17 July 2019, it was revealed that Tsang had agreed to move to Eastern.

== International career ==
Tsang was selected as a member of Hong Kong national under-19 football team in 2010 AFC U-19 Championship qualification. He has capped for 4 times at this level.

== Honours ==
=== Club ===
Eastern

- Hong Kong Senior Shield: 2019–20
- Hong Kong FA Cup: 2019–20

Tai Po

- Hong Kong Premier League: 2018–19
