= Tsang Tsz Hin =

Hong Kong footballer

Personal information
- Full name: Tsang Tsz Hin
- Date of birth: 27 October 1995 (age 31)
- Place of birth: Hong Kong
- Height: 1.75 m (5 ft 9 in)
- Positions: Defender; midfielder

Youth career
- North District
- South China
- 2009–2012: Eastern

Senior career*
| Years | Team | Apps | (Gls) |
| 2012–2014 | Southern | 6 | (0) |
| 2014–2015 | Tai Po | 0 | (0) |
| 2015–2016 | Tung Sing | 19 | (8) |
| 2016–2017 | Resources Capital | 16 | (4) |
| 2017–2019 | Hoi King | 41 | (4) |
| 2019–2020 | Yuen Long | 6 | (2) |
| 2020–2025 | Eastern District | 51 | (4) |

International career
- Hong Kong U-19
- * Club domestic league appearances and goals

Tsang Tsz Hin (Chinese: 曾梓軒; born 27 October 1995) is a Hong Kong former professional footballer who played as a defender or a midfielder.

Tsang is the son of Tsang Wai Chung, former head coach of South China and Hong Kong.
