= Hong Kong season play-offs =

The Hong Kong season play-offs was a knockout football competition held after the conclusion of the Hong Kong Premier League (or previously the Hong Kong First Division League) season to decide the second team (besides the league champions) to play in the AFC club competition (either the AFC Champions League or the AFC Cup). It was held between 2013 and 2017.

The AFC has written to HKFA, stating that only the top division league and cup champion are eligible for representing Hong Kong in AFC competitions, such that the season play-offs champion is ineligible for AFC competitions from 2019. Therefore, the season play-offs was cancelled starting from the 2017–18 season.

== Format ==
Eligible teams include:

- Runners-up of Hong Kong Premier League (Note: The runners-up of Hong Kong First Division League when it is the top division league.)
- Champion of Hong Kong Senior Challenge Shield
- Champion of Hong Kong FA Cup
- Champion of HKFA League Cup (Note: If the League Cup is not held for a particular season, the 3rd place of the League would take over that seat.)

Shall the champion of runners-up of Premier League also win the Senior Challenge Shield, FA Cup or League Cup, standby teams as determined by ranking of Premier League will enter the Play-offs. Note that the champion of Sapling Cup, founded in the 2015–16 season, is not given a seat at the Play-offs.

The four participating teams compete in a knockout tournament. Shall a match tie at the end of 90 minutes full-time, there would be 30 minutes of extra time. If the match still ties, then a penalty shoot-out would determine the winner.

== Winners ==
- 2012–13: Kitchee
- 2013–14: South China
- 2014–15: South China
- 2015–16: Kitchee
- 2016–17: Eastern
