= Tsang Chiu Tat =

Hong Kong footballer and coach

Tsang Chiu Tat 曾昭達
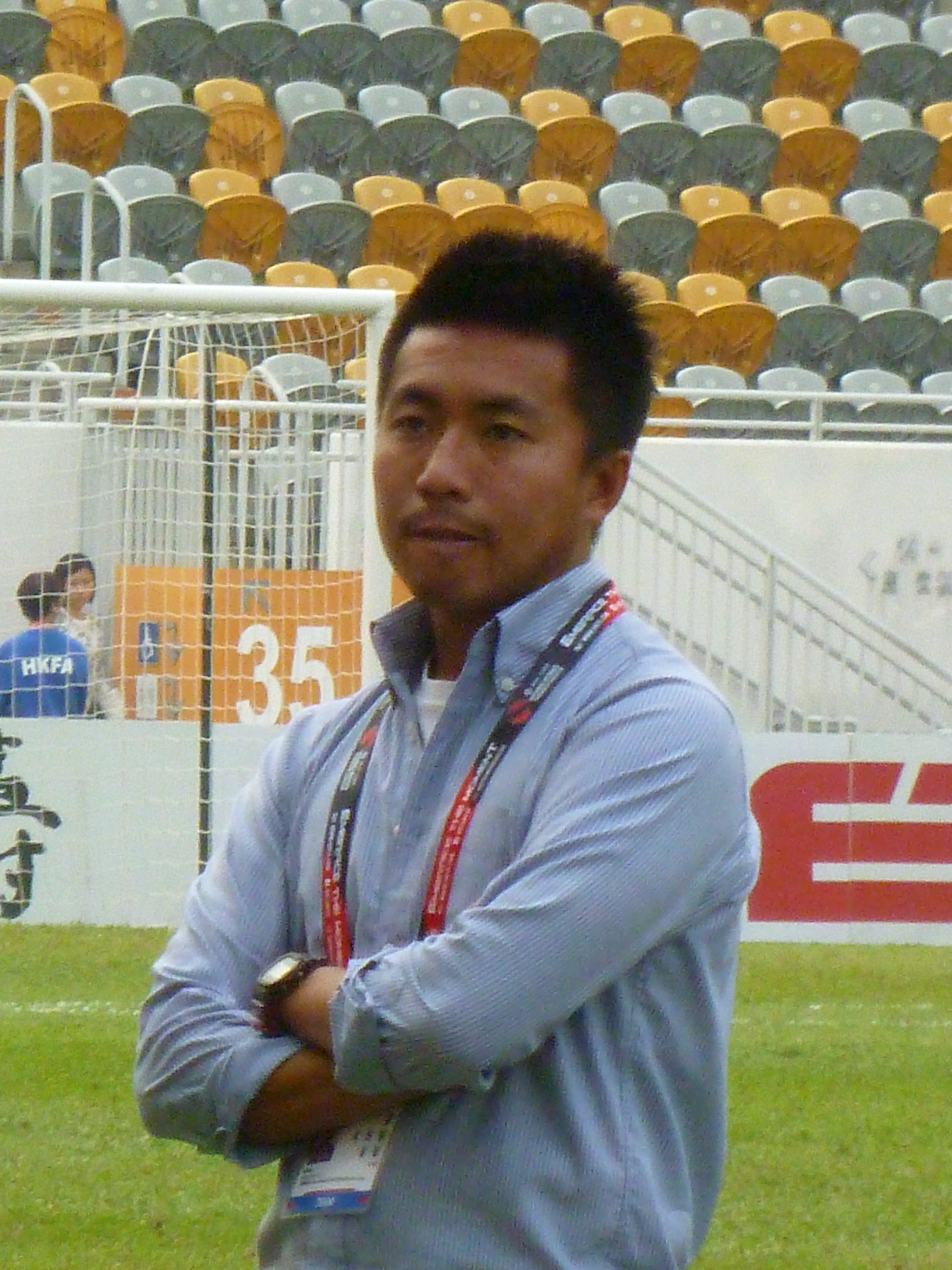

Personal information
- Full name: Tsang Chiu Tat
- Date of birth: 13 February 1989 (age 37)
- Place of birth: Hong Kong
- Height: 1.70 m (5 ft 7 in)
- Position: Defender

Youth career
- Hong Kong 09

Senior career*
Years	Team	Apps	(Gls)
2007–2008	Workable	0	(0)
2008–2009	Eastern	0	(0)
2009–2012	Citizen	8	(0)
2012–2013	Southern	8	(0)
2013	Tuen Mun	9	(0)
2014	Southern	3	(0)
2014–2015	Yau Tsim Mong	24	(2)
2015–2016	Yuen Long	6	(0)

Managerial career
- 2016–2018: Yuen Long
- 2018–2023: Lee Man (assistant coach)
- 2023–2024: Lee Man
- * Club domestic league appearances and goals as of 3 October 2024

Tsang Chiu Tat (Chinese: 曾昭達; born 13 February 1989) is a Hong Kong professional football coach and former professional footballer who played as a defender.

== Club career ==
After 8 years of professional football career, Tsang retired after the end of the 2015–16 season, last played for Yuen Long.

== Managerial career ==
=== Yuen Long ===
In July 2016, Tsang was appointed as the head coach of Yuen Long at the age of only 27. In January 2018, he led the club to win the first-ever Senior Shield title in 50 years.

=== Lee Man ===
In July 2018, Tsang was appointed as the assistant coach of Lee Man, partnering with Chan Hiu Ming.

On 5 February 2023, Tsang was appointed as the interim head coach of the club after the sacking of Chan.

On 27 April 2023, Tsang was appointed as the head coach of the club. In the following season, he led the club to an undefeated record in the Premier League, helping Lee Man to their first league title.

On 3 October 2024, owing to a poor start to the season, Tsang was sacked by the club.

== Honours ==
Lee Man

- Hong Kong Premier League: 2023–24

Yuen Long

- Hong Kong Senior Challenge Shield: 2017–18
