= Dieguito (footballer, born 1983) =

Spanish footballer

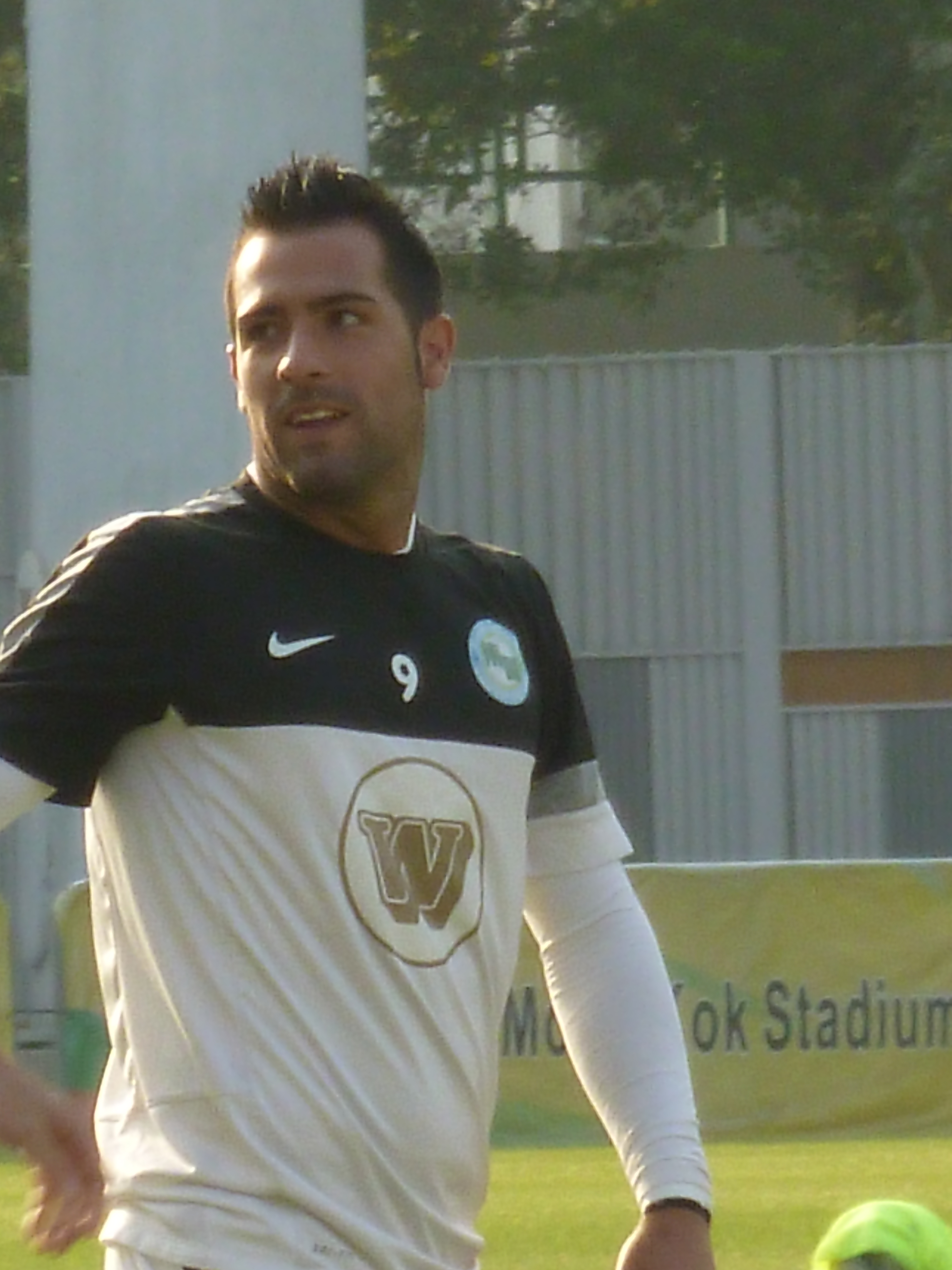

Personal information
- Full name: Diego Folgar Toimil
- Date of birth: 6 January 1983 (age 43)
- Place of birth: Vigo, Spain
- Height: 1.68 m (5 ft 6 in)
- Position: Midfielder

Senior career*
Years	Team	Apps	(Gls)
2001–2002	Oviedo B	4	(0)
2002–2003	Villarreal B		
2003–2004	Rápido de Bouzas		
2004–2005	C.D. Dolores		
2005–2007	Benidorm CD		
2007–2009	Calasparra		
2009–2010	Baza	34	(0)
2010	Jerez		
2010–2011	Baza	29	(6)
2011–2012	Torrevieja		
2012	Rapitenca		
2012–2014	Southern	41	(8)
2014–2015	Yokohama FC Hong Kong	9	(1)
2015–2016	Hong Kong Rangers FC	14	(0)
2016–2017	Southern	18	(0)
- * Club domestic league appearances and goals

Diego Folgar Toimil (born 6 January 1983), commonly known as Dieguito, is a Spanish former professional footballer. Dieguito also occasionally plays as winger.

Dieguito spent his time mostly at the lower-tier divisions in Spain before continuing his career in Hong Kong.

== Club career ==
=== Career in Spain ===
Dieguito started his professional career at 18 years old with Real Oviedo B in Segunda División B. He made his professional debut on 4 November 2011 against Sporting de Gijón B, being substituted 2 minutes before the end of match. He concluded the season with 4 appearances, but the club was relegated after the season.

Dieguito continued his football career at the fourth-tier Tercera División and fifth-tier Divisiones Regionales de Fútbol in Spain after spending a season in Segunda División B. He spent a total of 10 seasons in these division, and played for 9 clubs during the period.

=== Southern ===
Dieguito joined newly promoted Hong Kong First Division League club Southern District RSA. He made his debut for the club on 1 September 2012 against Biu Chun Rangers. He scored in the 1st minute but the club lost 1–3 eventually.

In the 2013–14 season, he was assigned squad number 10, after teammate Lam Ho Kwan changed to 2. Dieguito wore number 9 in the previous season.

== Club statistics ==
As of match played on 28 December 2015.

Club	Season	League			Cup		Other		Total	
Club	Season	Division	Apps	Goals	Apps	Goals	Apps	Goals	Apps	Goals
Real Oviedo B	2001–02	Segunda División B	4	0	—		—		4	0
Southern	2012–13	Hong Kong First Division	18	5	5	0	—		23	5
Southern	2013–14	Hong Kong First Division	19	3	4	1	—		23	4
Southern	Total		37	8	9	1	—		46	9
Yokohama FC Hong Kong	2014–15	Hong Kong Premier League	7	1	4	0	—		11	1
Hong Kong Rangers FC	2015–16	Hong Kong Premier League	5	0	3	0	—		8	0
Career total			53	9	16	1	0	0	69	10
