= 2011–12 Hong Kong Second Division League =

Hong Kong Second Division League
- Season: 2011–12
- Champions: Kam Fung
- Promoted: Southern
- Matches: 132
- Goals: 470 (3.56 per match)

2011–12 Hong Kong Second Division League is the 98th season of Hong Kong Second Division League, a football league in Hong Kong.

== Teams ==
=== Changes from last season ===
==== From Second Division League ====
===== Promoted to First Division League =====
- Sham Shui Po
- ~~Mutual~~ (expunged from the league system after withdrawing from the First Division)

===== Relegated to Third Division League =====
- Fukian
- Lucky Mile

==== To Second Division League ====
===== Relegated from First Division League =====
- Tai Chung
- HKFC

===== Promoted from Third Division League =====
- Wanchai
- Kuwn Tong

== Team Overview ==
Double Flower 花花	Kam Fung 金鋒科技	Happy Valley 愉園	HKFC 港會
Finishing position on last season: 2nd Runner-up	Finishing position on last season: 7th	Finishing position on last season: 5th	Finishing position on last season: 10th(First Division)

Kwai Tsing 葵青	Kwun Tong 觀塘	Shatin 沙田	Southern 南區
Finishing position on last season: 9th	Finishing position on last season: 2nd(Third Division "District")	Finishing position on last season: 4th	Finishing position on last season: 6th

Tai Chung 大中	Wanchai 灣仔	Wing Yee 永義	Yuen Long 元朗
Finishing position on last season: 9th(First Division)	Finishing position on last season: 1st(Third Division "District")	Finishing position on last season: 8th	Finishing position on last season: 10th

== League table ==
Pos	Team	Pld	W	D	L	GF	GA	GD	Pts	Promotion or relegation
1	Kam Fung	22	16	2	4	69	24	+45	50	Promotion to First Division
2	Southern	22	14	5	3	43	23	+20	47	Promotion to First Division
3	Hong Kong FC	22	14	4	4	46	23	+23	46	
4	Wanchai	22	12	4	6	35	29	+6	40	
5	Double Flower	22	12	3	7	60	35	+25	39	
6	Happy Valley	22	11	2	9	34	30	+4	35	
7	Shatin	22	7	4	11	41	43	−2	25	
8	Tai Chung	22	7	4	11	35	56	−21	25	
9	Yuen Long	22	6	4	12	26	43	−17	22	
10	Wing Yee	22	6	3	13	36	66	−30	21	
11	Kwun Tong	22	4	4	14	20	43	−23	16	Relegation to Third Division
12	Kwai Tsing	22	2	3	17	25	55	−30	9	Relegation to Third Division

Source: RSSSF
Rules for classification: 1) points; 2) head-to-head points; 3) head-to-head goal difference; 4) head-to-head goals scored; 5) goal difference; 6) number of goals scored.

== Results table ==
Home \ Away	DFL	HVA	HKF	KAM	KTD	KTF	SHA	SOU	TAI	WCH	WYE	YLF
Double Flower		0–2	1–2	0–1	3–2	3–2	4–1	2–4	2–0	1–1	6–1	4–2
Happy Valley	0–4		1–0	2–3	2–1	2–0	3–2	1–1	0–1	2–1	2–5	4–0
Hong Kong FC	2–2	3–2		2–1	2–2	1–1	4–0	0–1	6–3	2–1	0–3	5–0
Kam Fung	4–3	1–0	0–1		5–1	8–0	2–2	1–1	4–2	2–0	3–0	3–1
Kwai Tsing	0–4	1–4	1–4	0–4		4–4	0–2	0–1	0–4	1–2	1–2	2–0
Kwun Tong	0–1	1–0	2–3	0–1	2–1		1–2	0–2	4–1	0–1	0–1	0–0
Shatin	2–1	0–1	1–1	1–3	2–1	0–1		1–1	6–1	1–2	5–4	1–3
Southern	3–3	1–2	0–2	2–1	2–1	2–0	3–1		0–1	3–3	2–1	3–1
Tai Chung	3–2	0–2	0–1	0–8	3–1	1–1	1–1	0–2		4–3	3–3	1–4
Wanchai	1–4	1–0	1–0	3–2	2–0	3–1	1–0	1–3	4–1		2–1	0–0
Wing Yee	2–7	2–2	0–4	0–6	1–5	1–0	5–4	1–5	1–4	1–1		1–2
Yuen Long	0–3	2–0	0–1	3–6	0–0	5–0	0–6	0–1	1–1	0–1	2–0	

Updated to match(es) played on 15 April 2012. Source: Second Division League
Legend: Blue = home team win; Yellow = draw; Red = away team win.

== See also ==
- The Hong Kong Football Association
- Hong Kong First Division League
- Hong Kong Second Division League
- Hong Kong Third Division League
- 2010–11 Hong Kong Second Division League
