= 2010–11 Hong Kong Second Division League =

2010–11 Hong Kong Second Division League is the 96th season of a football league in Hong Kong, Hong Kong Second Division League.

== Changes from last season ==
=== From Second Division ===
Promoted to First Division

- HKFC
- Tuen Mun

Relegated to Third Division

- Derico Friends

=== To Second Division ===
Relegated from First Division

- Happy Valley
- Shatin

Promoted from Third Division League

- Lucky Mile
- Sham Shui Po
- Southern District
- Yuen Long

=== Name changing ===
- Mutual renamed as Pontic
- Ongood renamed as Biu Chun

== League table ==
Pos	Team	Pld	W	D	L	GF	GA	GD	Pts	Promotion or relegation
1	Sham Shui Po (C, P)	22	16	4	2	57	15	+42	52	Promotion to First Division
2	Pontic (P, D)	22	17	1	4	80	27	+53	52	Expunged from the league system after withdrawing from the First Division
3	Advance Double Flower	22	13	4	5	46	29	+17	43	
4	Shatin	22	13	3	6	40	29	+11	42	
5	Happy Valley	22	11	2	9	38	35	+3	35	
6	Southern District	22	9	6	7	37	33	+4	33	
7	Biu Chun	22	9	4	9	37	38	−1	31	
8	Wing Yee	22	8	3	11	38	50	−12	27	
9	Kwai Tsing	22	5	3	14	26	50	−24	18	
10	Yuen Long	22	5	3	14	26	41	−15	18	
11	Fukien (R)	22	5	2	15	21	56	−35	17	Relegation to Third Division
12	Lucky Mile (R)	22	3	1	18	21	64	−43	10	Relegation to Third Division

Updated to match(es) played on 17 April 2011. Source: The Hong Kong Football Association
Rules for classification: 1) points; 2) goal difference; 3) number of goals scored.
(C) Champions; (D) Disqualified; (P) Promoted; (R) Relegated

== Top scorers ==
Rank	Scorer	Club	Goals
1	Fábio	Pontic	23
2	Lawrence Akandu	Pontic	18
3	Lau Ka Shing	Happy Valley	16
4	Emmanuel John	Biu Chun	15
5	Joe-Joe Abah	Pontic/Sham Shui Po	13
6	Wong Wai	Sham Shui Po	12
7	Yau Ping Kai	Wing Yee	11
8	Tai Man Shing	Southern District	9
8	Tai Ko Kiu	Kwai Tsing	9
10	Tita Chou	Advance Double Flower	8
10	Ha Shing Chi	Southern District	8
