= Southern District F.C. =

Association football club in Hong Kong

Southern
- Full name: Southern District Recreation & Sports Assn. Ltd.
- Nickname: The Aberdeeners
- Founded: 2002; 24 years ago
- Ground: Aberdeen Sports Ground
- Capacity: 4,500
- President: Matthew Wong
- Head coach: Chan Chi Hong
- League: Hong Kong Premier League
- 2025–26: Hong Kong Premier League, 7th of 10
- Website: www.sdfc.org.hk
Home colours	Away colours

Southern District Recreation & Sports Assn Ltd (Chinese: 南區足球會), commonly known as Southern and currently known for sponsorship reasons as Kwoon Chung Southern, is a professional football club based in Southern District, Hong Kong. They currently compete in the Hong Kong Premier League.

== History ==
Southern District entered the newly formed Hong Kong Third District Division during the 2002–03 season. However, the team did not reach the Hong Kong Third Division League final round and thus did not get promotion in the first few years of their history.

In the 2006–07 season, they reached the final round for the first time since the club was formed. They were the runners up of the Third District Division and qualified for the final round, however, they could not get promotion as they only managed to gain two points.

In the 2007–08 season, they retained last season's good performance, reached the final round again as they were again the 1st runner-up of Third District Division League, 9 points behind Shatin. Unfortunately, they could not gain the promotion again as they were 4 points behind the promotion places.

In the 2008–09 season, they could not qualify for the final round as they only placed at 4th of Third District Division.

They were finally promoted to the Hong Kong Second Division for the first time in the 2009–10 season. They were the 1st runner-up of the Third District Division League and competed with the other 3 teams in the final round for promotion. Although they only placed at 3rd in the final round, Eastern decided not to accept promotion and the right to be promoted was passed to Southern who did accept.

They successfully avoided relegation and stayed in the Second Division during their first season. They were the 4th out of 12 teams, 10 points behind the champions Sham Shui Po. On the other hand, they won their first trophy since their formation on 9 January 2011. They defeated Double Flower in the final of Hong Kong Junior Shield at Hong Kong Stadium.

They were promoted to the Hong Kong First Division for the first time in the 2011–12 season, as they were the 1st runner-up of the Hong Kong Second Division, three points behind champions Rangers.

They were branded as Royal Southern in the 2013–14 season, and finished 4th out of 12 teams. However, the club chose to self-relegate after the end of the season.

They returned to the top flight in the 2015–16 season. Starting from this season, the club was rebranded as Kwoon Chung Southern due to sponsorship reasons.

In 2016–17, Southern finished third in the table, their highest position in club history.

Southern matched their table position from 2016 to 2017 with another third-place finish in 2018–19. The club also reached the finals of Hong Kong FA Cup for the first time, losing 2–0 to Kitchee.

The club claimed their first silverware in the form of the 2022–23 Sapling Cup with a 2–0 win over Lee Man aided by a brace by Stefan Pereira.

== Name history ==
- 2002–2013: Southern (南區)
- 2013–2014: Royal Southern (皇室南區)
- 2014–2015: Southern (南區)
- 2015–: Kwoon Chung Southern (冠忠南區)

== Stadium ==
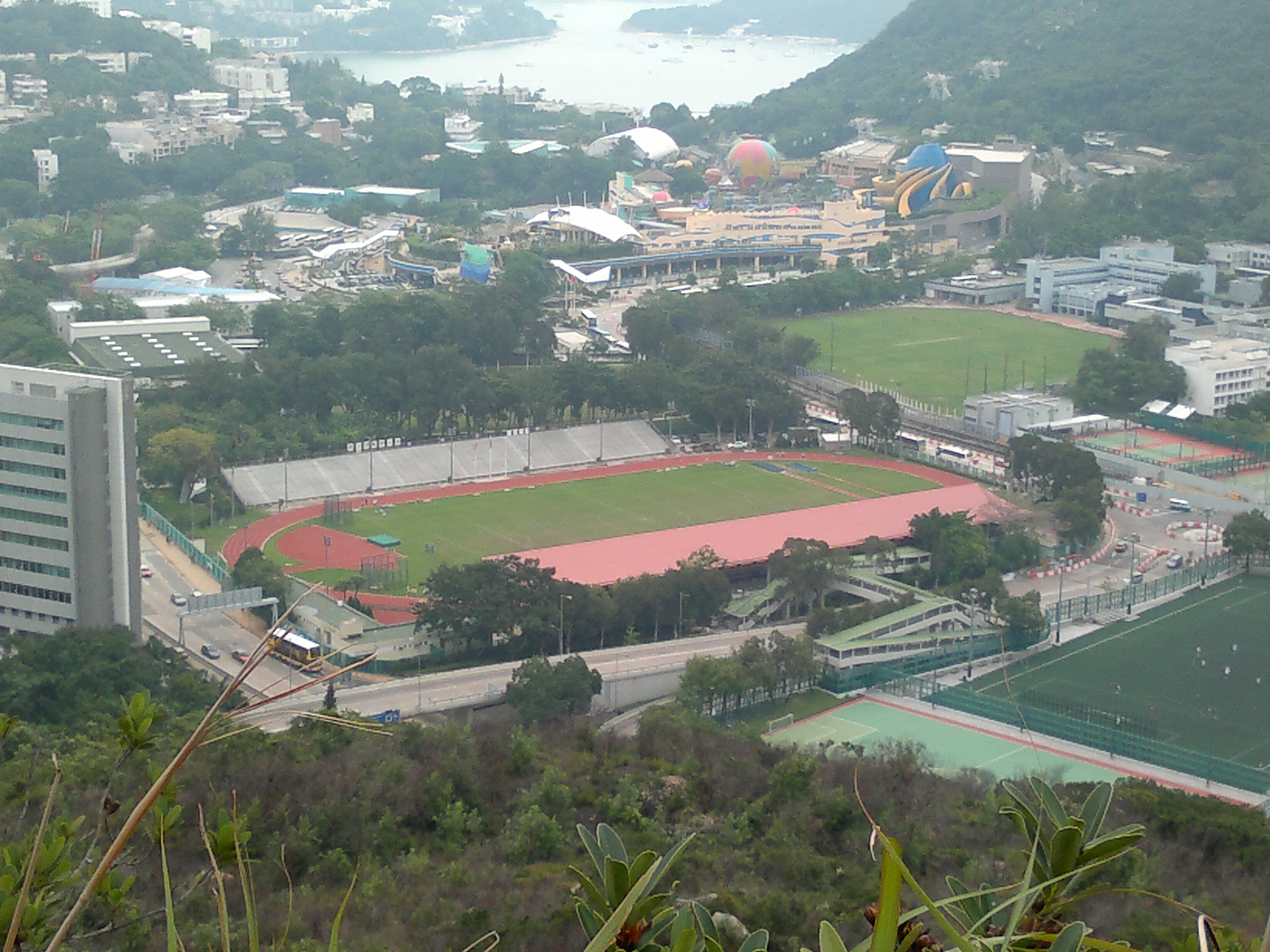
Aberdeen Sports Ground viewed from Bennet's Hill

Since 2007, Southern have played their home games at Aberdeen Sports Ground. They began playing their home games there during their days in the Hong Kong Third District Division.

After Southern was promoted to the Hong Kong First Division, the club have continued to use Aberdeen Sports Ground as their home stadium.

In September 2018, the canopy of the main grandstand at Aberdeen Sports Ground was damaged due to Typhoon Mangkhut. Although a temporary canopy was erected over the opposite grandstand in order to allow Southern to continue to use the stadium for the remainder of the 2018–19 season, the Leisure and Cultural Services Department determined that installation of a new canopy on the main grandstand was to begin in June 2019. As the renovations were scheduled to last until the end of March 2020, Southern applied to use Mong Kok Stadium as their home stadium for the 2019–20 season.

== Club officials ==
=== Executive staff ===
Position	Staff
Club president	(Hong Kong) Chan Man Chun
Club chairman	(Hong Kong) Wong Cheuk Tim

=== Coaching staff ===
Position	Staff
Head coach	(Hong Kong) Chan Chi Hong
Technical director	(Hong Kong) Cheng Siu Chung
Assistant coaches	(Hong Kong) Ju Yingzhi
Assistant coaches	(Hong Kong) Kwok Chun Lam
Goalkeeping coach	(Hong Kong) Fan Chun Yip
Team manager	(Hong Kong) Pui Ho Wang

== Current squad ==
=== First team ===
As of 26 August 2026

Note: Flags indicate national team as defined under FIFA eligibility rules; some limited exceptions apply. Players may hold more than one non-FIFA nationality.

No.	Pos.	Nation	Player
1	GK	HKG	Ng Wai Him
2	DF	SCO	Calum Hall
3	DF	BRA	Fábio Erins
4	DF	JPN	Kota Kawase
5	DF	BRA	Danilo Santos
6	MF	BRA	Igor César
7	FW	HKG	Stefan Pereira
8	MF	HKG	Lee Ka Yiu
9	FW	HKG	Poon Pui Hin
10	FW	HKG	Wong Ho Chun
11	MF	JPN	Shu Sasaki (captain)
12	MF	HKG	Lai Kak Yi
14	MF	HKG	Lee Ching
16	DF	HKG	Chak Ting Fung

No.	Pos.	Nation	Player
17	MF	USA	Javen Leung
18	FW	JPN	Tatsuya Inoue
19	MF	HKG	Chong Tsun
22	FW	SRB	Stefan Golubović
24	DF	HKG	Cheung Pak Wing
27	FW	BRA	Kayron
31	GK	HKG	Ngan Ngo Tin
32	GK	HKG	Hui Pak Wai
33	MF	BRA	Lucas Agueiro
38	FW	KOR	Gil Yehudayan
63	MF	ENG	Balraj Landa
77	MF	HKG	Hon Shing Wing
99	DF	HKG	Cheng Tsz Sum

== Season-to-season record ==
Season	Tier	Division	Teams	Position	Home stadium	Attendance/G	FA Cup	Senior Shield	League Cup	Sapling Cup
2002–03	3	Third District Division	13				Did not enter		Did not enter	Not held
2003–04	3	Third District Division					Did not enter		Did not enter	Not held
2004–05	3	Third District Division					Did not enter		Did not enter	Not held
2005–06	3	Third District Division	16	4			Did not enter		Did not enter	Not held
2006–07	3	Third District Division	17	2			Did not enter		Did not enter	Not held
2007–08	3	Third District Division	16	2			Did not enter		Did not enter	Not held
2008–09	3	Third District Division	15	4			Did not enter		Did not enter	Not held
2009–10	3	Third District Division	14	2			Did not enter		Not held	Not held
2010–11	2	Second Division	12	6			Did not enter		Did not enter	Not held
2011–12	2	Second Division	12	2			Did not enter		Did not enter	Not held
2012–13	1	First Division	10	4	Aberdeen Sports Ground	554	First round	Semi-finals	Not held	Not held
2013–14	1	First Division	12	4	Aberdeen Sports Ground; Mong Kok Stadium	434	Semi-finals	Semi-finals	Not held	Not held
2014–15	2	First Division	15	3			First round	Did not enter	Did not enter	Not held
2015–16	1	Premier League	9	4	Aberdeen Sports Ground	489	Semi-finals	Runners-up	Group stage	Group stage
2016–17	1	Premier League	11	3	Aberdeen Sports Ground	532	Semi-finals	Semi-finals	Not held	Semi-finals
2017–18	1	Premier League	10	5	Aberdeen Sports Ground	493	Semi-finals	Semi-finals	Not held	Group stage
2018–19	1	Premier League	10	3	Aberdeen Sports Ground	827	Runners-up	Quarter-finals	Not held	Group stage
2019–20	1	Premier League	10	5	Mong Kok Stadium	861	Quarter-finals	Quarter-finals	Not held	Runners-up
2020–21	1	Premier League	8	5	Aberdeen Sports Ground	627	Cancelled due to COVID-19 pandemic		Not held	Group stage
2021–22	1	Premier League	8	Cancelled	Aberdeen Sports Ground	424	Cancelled due to COVID-19 pandemic		Not held	Cancelled due to COVID-19 pandemic
2022–23	1	Premier League	10	5	Aberdeen Sports Ground	502	Semi-finals	Quarter-finals	Not held	Champions
2023–24	1	Premier League	11	5	Aberdeen Sports Ground	332	Quarter-finals	Quarter-finals	Not held	Semi-finals
2024–25	1	Premier League	9	5	Aberdeen Sports Ground	424	Quarter-finals	Quarter-finals	Not held	Champions
2025–26	1	Premier League	10	7	Aberdeen Sports Ground	398	First round	First round	First round	Defunct
2026–27	1	Premier League	11		Aberdeen Sports Ground		Quarter-finals		Redemption first round	Defunct

Note: 1st or Champions 2nd or Runners-up 3rd place Promotion Relegation

== Honours ==
=== Cup competitions ===
- Hong Kong Sapling Cup

Champions (2): 2022–23, 2024–25

- Hong Kong Junior Shield

Champions (1): 2010–11

== Past managers ==
- (Hong Kong) Cheng Siu Chung (2006–2008)
- (Hong Kong) Fung Hoi Man (2009–2015)
- (Hong Kong) Cheng Siu Chung (2015–2020)
- (Hong Kong) Pui Ho Wang, (Hong Kong) Cristiano Cordeiro (2020)
- (Pakistan) Zesh Rehman (2020–2022)
- (Hong Kong) Cheng Siu Chung (2022–2023)
- (Hong Kong) Yeung Ching Kwong (2023–2025)
- (Hong Kong) Pui Ho Wang (2025–2026)
- (Hong Kong) Chan Chi Hong (2026–present)

== eSports ==
Southern District is the first Hong Kong football club of creating an eSports department. By partnering with Nova Esports, they signed Ronnie Yau as a FIFA player and Kevin Lau as a Pro Evolution Soccer player.
