= 2013–14 Sun Pegasus FC season =

Sun Pegasus
2013–14 season
- Chairman: Cheng Ting Kong
- Head Coach: Chan Chi Hong
- Home Ground: Mong Kok Stadium (Capacity: 6,680)
- First Division: 9th (alphabetically)
- Senior Shield: TBD
- FA Cup: TBD
Home colours	Away colours

The 2013–14 season is Sun Pegasus's 6th consecutive season in the Hong Kong First Division League, as well as in Hong Kong football. Sun Pegasus will compete in the First Division League, Senior Challenge Shield and FA Cup in this season.

== Key events ==
- 21 May 2013: Club captain Jaimes McKee rejects offers from the Chinese Super League clubs and extends a 1-year contract with the club.
- 22 May 2013: Serbian defender Igor Miovic and Cameroonian midfielder Eugene Mbome extend 1-year contracts with the club.
- 23 May 2013: The Hong Kong Football Association confirmed that Sun Pegasus has been assigned Mong Kok Stadium as their home ground for the following three seasons.
- 30 May 2013: Hong Kong international midfielder Xu Deshuai joins fellow First Division club Kitchee for an undisclosed fee.
- 3 June 2013: Hong Kong midfielder Chow Ki leaves the club (reserves) and joins fellow First Division club I-Sky Yuen Long for free.
- 6 June 2013: Hong Kong midfielder Michael Campion joins the club from fellow First Division club Citizen for an undisclosed fee.
- 7 June 2013: Chinese-Hong Kong striker Yuan Yang joins the club from fellow First Division club Sun Pegasus for an undisclosed fee.
- 13 June 2013: Canadian-born Hong Kong midfielder Landon Ling joins the club from fellow First Division club Kitchee for an undisclosed fee.
- 17 June 2013: Hong Kong midfielder Fung Kai Hong leaves the club and joins newly promoted First Division club I-Sky Yuen Long for free.
- 11 July 2013: Bosnian striker Admir Raščić joins the club on a free transfer.
- 11 July 2013: Serbian midfielder Aleksandar Ranđelović joins the club from Hungarian Nemzeti Bajnokság II club Békéscsaba 1912 Előre SE for an undisclosed fee.
- 1 October 2013: Chinese striker Yuan Yang leaves the club and joins fellow First Division club Tuen Mun on loan until the end of the season.
- 4 December 2013: South Korean striker Kim Dong-Ryeol leaves the club on mutual consent.
- 7 December 2013: Hong Kong midfielder Ng Siu Fai joins the club on a free transfer.
- 7 December 2013: Hong Kong midfielder Ko Chun rejoins the club from Second Division club Wing Yee for an undisclosed fee.
- 30 December 2013: Australian striker Marko Jesic joins the club from A-League club Newcastle Jets on a free transfer.
- 30 December 2013: Chinese-born Hong Kong midfielder Bai He leaves the club and joins Chinese League One club Shijiazhuang Yongchang for HK$100k.
- 30 December 2013: Hong Kong defender Wong Yim Kwan joins the club from fellow First Division club Happy Valley for an undisclosed fee.
- 1 January 2014: Hong Kong midfielder Yip Tsz Chun joins the club from fellow First Division club Tuen Mun for an undisclosed fee.
- 6 January 2014: Chinese striker Yuan Yang is recalled by the club from fellow First Division club Tuen Mun.
- 8 March 2014: Hong Kong midfielder Choi Kwok Wai joins the club from fellow First Division club Happy Valley on a free transfer.
- 8 March 2014: Chinese striker Li Jian joins the club from fellow First Division club Happy Valley on a free transfer.

== Players ==
=== Squad information ===
N	P	Nat.	Name	Date of birth	Age	Since	Previous club	Notes
1	GK	(Hong Kong)	Ng Yat Hoi^{LP}	6 November 1986	27	2012	(Hong Kong) Kam Fung	
2	DF	(Hong Kong)	Lee Wai Lun^{LP}	7 March 1981	33	2010	(Hong Kong) South China	
4	DF	(Hong Kong)	Deng Jinghuang^{LP}	24 January 1985	29	2008	(Hong Kong) South China	Second nationality: China
5	DF	(Brazil)	Paulo Cesar Fonseca Nunes^{FP}	20 February 1979	35	2013 (Winter)	(Brazil) Central SC	
6	FW	(China)	Li Jian^{LP}	5 February 1986	28	2014 (Winter)	(Hong Kong) Happy Valley	Second nationality: Hong Kong
7	MF	(Canada)	Landon Lloyd Ling^{LP}	8 October 1987	26	2013	(Hong Kong) Kitchee	Second nationality: Hong Kong
8	MF	(Hong Kong)	Michael Campion^{LP}	20 May 1984	30	2013	(Hong Kong) Citizen	Second nationality: England
9	FW	(Bosnia and Herzegovina)	Admir Raščić^{FP}	16 September 1981	32	2013	Free agent	
10	MF	(Cameroon)	Eugene Mbome^{FP}	29 August 1986	27	2008	(Portugal) Sporting Clube de Pombal	
11	FW	(Australia)	Marko Jesic^{AP}	7 August 1989	24	2014 (Winter)	(Australia) Newcastle Jets	Second nationality: Serbia
14	FW	(Hong Kong)	Tsui Hoi Kin^{LP}	7 July 1994	19	2013	(Hong Kong) Tai Chung	
15	MF	(Hong Kong)	Chan Kin Fai^{LP}	25 October 1991	22	2012	(Hong Kong) Kwun Tong	
16	GK	(Hong Kong)	Ho Kwok Chuen^{LP}	20 February 1977	37	2013 (Winter)	(Hong Kong) Sunray Cave JC Sun Hei	
17	MF	(Hong Kong)	Chan Pak Hang^{LP}	21 November 1992	21	2012	(Hong Kong) South China	
18	DF	(Hong Kong)	Wong Yim Kwan^{LP}	1 August 1992	21	2014 (Winter)	(Hong Kong) Happy Valley	
19	FW	(China)	Yuan Yang^{LP}	12 December 1985	28	2013	(Hong Kong) Citizen	
20	DF	(Serbia)	Igor Miović^{FP}	31 March 1986	28	2013 (Winter)	(Serbia) Smederevo	
21	DF	(Hong Kong)	Tong Kin Man^{LP}	10 January 1985	29	2012	(Hong Kong) Biu Chun Rangers	
22	GK	(Hong Kong)	Yuen Ho Chun^{LP}	19 July 1995	18	2010	Youth system	
23	FW	(Hong Kong)	Jaimes McKee^{LP}	14 April 1987	27	2011	Hong Kong FC	Team captain; Second nationality: England
24	MF	(Hong Kong)	Ju Yingzhi^{LP}	24 July 1987	26	2011	(Hong Kong) Citizen	Second nationality: China
26	MF	(Hong Kong)	Ng Siu Fai^{LP}	24 September 1988	25	2014 (Winter)	Free agent	
28	MF	(Hong Kong)	Lo Chun Kit^{LP}	13 November 1985	28	2012	(Hong Kong) Wanchai	
29	MF	(Serbia)	Aleksandar Ranđelović^{FP}	9 December 1987	26	2013	(Hungary) Békéscsaba	
30	MF	(Hong Kong)	Ko Chun^{LP}	1 January 1990	24	2014 (Winter)	(Hong Kong) Wing Yee	
32	GK	(Croatia)	Josip Škorić^{FP}	12 February 1981	33	2013 (Winter)	(Croatia) Šibenik	
33	DF	(Hong Kong)	So Wai Chuen^{LP}	26 March 1988	26	2010	(Hong Kong) Sun Hei	
37	MF	(Hong Kong)	Choi Kwok Wai^{LP}	28 December 1991	22	2014 (Winter)	(Hong Kong) Happy Valley	
38	MF	(Hong Kong)	Yip Tsz Chun^{LP}	15 May 1985	29	2014 (Winter)	(Hong Kong) Tuen Mun	

Last update: 8 March 2014
Source: Sun Pegasus FC
Ordered by squad number.
^{LP}Local player; ^{FP}Foreign player; ^{AP}Asian player; ^{NR}Non-registered player

=== Transfers ===
==== In ====
#	Position	Player	Transferred from	Fee	Date	Team	Source
8	MF	(Hong Kong) Michael Campion	(Hong Kong) Citizen	Undisclosed	6 June 2013	First team	
19	FW	(China) Yuan Yang	(Hong Kong) Citizen	Undisclosed	7 June 2013	First team	
27	MF	(Canada) Landon Lloyd Ling	(Hong Kong) Kitchee	Undisclosed	13 June 2013	First team	
9	FW	(Bosnia and Herzegovina) Admir Raščić	Free agent	Free transfer	11 July 2013	First team	
29	MF	(Serbia) Aleksandar Ranđelović	(Hungary) Békéscsaba	Undisclosed	11 July 2013	First team	
26	MF	(Hong Kong) Ng Siu Fai	Free agent	Free transfer	7 December 2013	First team	
30	MF	(Hong Kong) Ko Chun	(Hong Kong) Wing Yee	Undisclosed	7 December 2013	First team	
11	FW	(Australia) Marko Jesic	(Australia) Newcastle Jets	Free transfer	30 December 2013	First team	
18	DF	(Hong Kong) Wong Yim Kwan	(Hong Kong) Happy Valley	Undisclosed	30 December 2013	First team	
38	MF	(Hong Kong) Yip Tsz Chun	(Hong Kong) Tuen Mun	Undisclosed	1 January 2014	First team	
37	MF	(Hong Kong) Choi Kwok Wai	(Hong Kong) Happy Valley	Free transfer	8 March 2014	First team	
6	FW	(China) Li Jian	(Hong Kong) Happy Valley	Free transfer	8 March 2014	First team	

==== Out ====
#	Position	Player	Transferred to	Fee	Date	Team	Source
8	MF	(Hong Kong) Xu Deshuai	(Hong Kong) Kitchee	Undisclosed	30 May 2013	First team	
	MF	(Hong Kong) Chow Ki	(Hong Kong) I-Sky Yuen Long	Free transfer	3 June 2013	Reserves	
	MF	(Hong Kong) Fung Kai Hong	(Hong Kong) I-Sky Yuen Long	Free transfer	17 June 2013	Reserves	
11	FW	(Bosnia and Herzegovina) Vladimir Karalić	Unattached (End of Contract)	Free transfer	30 June 2013	First team	
11	FW	(South Korea) Kim Dong-Ryeol	Unattached (Mutual Consent)	Free transfer	4 December 2013	First team	
6	MF	(Hong Kong) Bai He	(China) Shijiazhuang Yongchang	$100k	30 December 2013	First team	

==== Loan In ====
#	Position	Player	Loaned from	Date	Loan expires	Team	Source

==== Loan out ====
#	Position	Player	Loaned to	Date	Loan expires	Team	Source
19	FW	(China) Yuan Yang	Tuen Mun	1 October 2013	6 January 2014	First team	

== Squad statistics ==
Note: Voided matches are not counted in the statistics except discipline records.

=== Overall Stats ===
	First Division	Senior Shield	FA Cup	Total Stats
Games played	15	4	1	20
Games won	8	3	0	11
Games drawn	2	0	0	2
Games lost	5	1	1	7
Goals for	36	9	2	47
Goals against	26	5	3	34
Players used	28	16	14	28^{1}
Yellow cards	39	11	4	54
Red cards	1	0	0	1

Last updated: 30 March 2014
Source: Player Stats

Players Used: Sun Pegasus have used a total of 28 different players in all competitions.

=== Squad Stats ===
				Total				Hong Kong First Division League		Senior Challenge Shield		FA Cup		
N	Pos.	Name	Nat.	GS	App	Gls	Min	App	Gls	App	Gls	App	Gls	Notes
1	GK	Ng Yat Hoi	(Hong Kong)	6	7	-11	587	6	-10	1	-1			GA
16	GK	Ho Kwok Chuen	(Hong Kong)											GA
22	GK	Yuen Ho Chun	(Hong Kong)											GA
32	GK	Josip Škorić	(Croatia)	13	14	-23	1153	10	-16	3	-4	1	-3	GA
2	LB	Lee Wai Lun	(Hong Kong)		2		17	2						
4	CB	Deng Jinghuang	(Hong Kong)	15	17		1248	12		4		1		
5	CB	Cesar	(Brazil)	14	14	2	1219	10	2	4				
18	RB	Wong Yim Kwan	(Hong Kong)	5	7		455	7						
20	CB	Igor Miović	(Serbia)	17	17	3	1560	12	3	4		1		
21	RB	Tong Kin Man	(Hong Kong)	18	18		1611	13		4		1		
33	CB	So Wai Chuen	(Hong Kong)	7	11	1	614	9	1	1		1		
7	LM	Landon Ling	(Canada)	5	14	1	586	11	1	2		1		
8	CM	Michael Campion	(Hong Kong)	3	5	1	314	4	1	1				
10	DM	Eugene Mbome	(Cameroon)	16	18		1468	13		4		1		
15	CM	Chan Kin Fai	(Hong Kong)		1		9	1						
17	AM	Chan Pak Hang	(Hong Kong)	10	18	1	1022	13		4	1	1		
24	CM	Ju Yingzhi	(Hong Kong)	17	18	7	1589	13	4	4	2	1	1	
26	CM	Ng Siu Fai	(Hong Kong)		1		9	1						
28	DM	Lo Chun Kit	(Hong Kong)	6	9		384	7		2				
29	AM	Aleksandar Ranđelović	(Serbia)	14	18	4	1191	14	4	3		1		
30	AM	Ko Chun	(Hong Kong)											
37	RM	Choi Kwok Wai	(Hong Kong)		2		79	2						
38	AM	Yip Tsz Chun	(Hong Kong)	5	7	2	415	6	2			1		
	DM	Bai He	(Hong Kong)	8	11		732	8		3				
6	FW	Li Jian	(China)		1		23	1						
9	FW	Admir Raščić	(Bosnia and Herzegovina)	19	19	15	1712	14	12	4	3	1		
11	FW	Marko Jesic	(Australia)	4	5		350	4		1				
14	FW	Tsui Hoi Kin	(Hong Kong)											
19	FW	Yuan Yang	(China)	1	2		46	2						
23	FW	Jaimes Mckee	(Hong Kong)	16	19	9	1523	14	5	4	3	1	1	
	FW	Kim Dong-Ryeol	(South Korea)		1		2	1						

Last updated: 30 March 2014
Ordered by Position
0 shown as blank

=== Top scorers ===
Place	Position	Nationality	Number	Name	First Division	Senior Shield	FA Cup	Total
1	FW	(Bosnia and Herzegovina)	9	Admir Raščić	12	3	0	15
2	FW	(Hong Kong)	23	Jaimes McKee	4	3	1	8
3	MF	(Hong Kong)	24	Ju Yingzhi	6	0	1	7
4	DF	(Serbia)	20	Igor Miović	4	0	0	4
4	MF	(Serbia)	29	Aleksandar Ranđelović	4	0	0	4
6	DF	(Brazil)	5	Paulo Cesar Fonseca Nunes	2	0	0	2
6	MF	(Hong Kong)	37	Yip Tsz Chun	2	0	0	2
8	DF	(Hong Kong)	4	Deng Jinghuang	1	0	0	1
8	MF	(Canada)	7	Landon Ling	1	0	0	1
8	MF	(Hong Kong)	8	Michael Campion	1	0	0	1
8	MF	(Hong Kong)	17	Chan Pak Hang	1	0	0	1
8	DF	(Hong Kong)	33	So Wai Chuen	1	0	0	1
TOTALS					36	9	2	47

Last update: 30 March 2014

=== Disciplinary record ===
Includes all competitive matches. Players listed below made at least one appearance for Sun Pegasus first squad during the season.

N	P	Nat.	Name	League			Shield			FA Cup			Total			Notes
N	P	Nat.	Name	Yellow card	Second yellow card	Red card	Yellow card	Second yellow card	Red card	Yellow card	Second yellow card	Red card	Yellow card	Second yellow card	Red card	Notes
1	GK	(Hong Kong)	Ng Yat Hoi													
2	DF	(Hong Kong)	Lee Wai Lun													
4	DF	(Hong Kong)	Deng Jinghuang	3			1						4			
5	DF	(Brazil)	Cesar	2			1						3			
6	FW	(China)	Li Jian													
7	MF	(Hong Kong) (Canada)	Landon Ling	3	1		1						4	1		
8	MF	(England) (Hong Kong)	Michael Campion	1									1			
9	FW	(Bosnia and Herzegovina)	Admir Raščić	3			1						4			
10	MF	(Cameroon)	Eugene Mbome	6			1			1			8			
15	MF	(Hong Kong)	Chan Kin Fai													
17	MF	(Hong Kong)	Chan Pak Hang	1									1			
18	DF	(Hong Kong)	Wong Yim Kwan	2									2			
20	DF	(Serbia)	Igor Miović	3			2						5			
21	DF	(Hong Kong)	Tong Kin Man	5						1			6			
23	FW	(Hong Kong)	Jaimes McKee	1									1			
24	MF	(Hong Kong) (China)	Ju Yingzhi	3			2			1			6			
28	MF	(Hong Kong)	Lo Chun Kit	1			1						2			
29	MF	(Serbia)	Aleksandar Ranđelović	4									4			
32	GK	(Croatia)	Josip Škorić	2									2			
33	DF	(Hong Kong)	So Wai Chuen	1						1			2			
37	MF	(Hong Kong)	Choi Kwok Wai													
38	MF	(Hong Kong)	Yip Tsz Chun													
	FW	(South Korea)	Kim Dong-Ryeol													
	MF	(Hong Kong) (China)	Bai He				1						1			

Last updated: 30 March 2014
Source: Competitive matches
Ordered by (red card) , (second yellow card) and (yellow card)
(yellow card) = Number of bookings; (second yellow card) = Number of sending offs after a second yellow card; (red card) = Number of sending offs by a direct red card.

=== Substitution record ===
Includes all competitive matches.

			League		Shield		FA Cup		Others		Total	
No.	Pos	Name	subson	subsoff	subson	subsoff	subson	subsoff	subson	subsoff	subson	subsoff
Goalkeepers
1	GK	Ng Yat Hoi	1	0	0	0	0	0	0	0	1	0
16	GK	Ho Kwok Chuen	0	0	0	0	0	0	0	0	0	0
22	GK	Yuen Ho Chun	0	0	0	0	0	0	0	0	0	0
32	GK	Josip Škorić	0	1	0	0	0	0	0	0	0	1
Defenders
2	LB	Lee Wai Lun	2	0	0	0	0	0	0	0	2	0
4	CB	Deng Jinghuang	1	5	1	1	0	0	0	0	2	6
5	CB	Cesar	0	2	0	1	0	0	0	0	0	3
18	RB	Wong Yim Kwan	2	2	0	0	0	0	0	0	2	2
20	CB	Igor Miović	0	0	0	0	0	0	0	0	0	0
21	RB	Tong Kin Man	0	1	0	1	0	0	0	0	0	2
33	CB	So Wai Chuen	3	3	2	0	0	1	0	0	5	4
Midfielders
7	LM	Landon Ling	6	4	3	0	1	0	0	0	10	4
8	CM	Michael Campion	2	0	0	0	0	0	0	0	2	0
10	DM	Eugene Mbome	2	2	0	2	0	0	0	0	2	4
15	CM	Chan Kin Fai	1	0	0	0	0	0	0	0	1	0
17	AM	Chan Pak Hang	6	5	1	3	1	0	0	0	8	8
24	CM	Ju Yingzhi	1	1	0	0	0	0	0	0	1	1
26	CM	Ng Siu Fai	1	0	0	0	0	0	0	0	1	0
28	DM	Lo Chun Kit	3	5	0	0	0	0	0	0	3	5
29	AM	Aleksandar Ranđelović	2	6	2	1	0	0	0	0	4	7
30	AM	Ko Chun	0	0	0	0	0	0	0	0	0	0
37	RM	Choi Kwok Wai	2	0	0	0	0	0	0	0	2	0
38	AM	Yip Tsz Chun	2	3	0	0	0	1	0	0	2	4
	DM	Bai He	2	0	2	1	0	0	0	0	4	1
Forwards
6	WI	Li Jian	1	0	0	0	0	0	0	0	1	0
9	CF	Admir Raščić	0	2	0	0	0	0	0	0	0	2
11	CF	Marko Jasic	0	1	1	0	0	0	0	0	1	1
14	SS	Tsui Hoi Kin	0	0	0	0	0	0	0	0	0	0
19	SS	Yuan Yang	1	1	0	0	0	0	0	0	1	1
23	SS	Jaimes Mckee	3	3	0	0	0	0	0	0	3	3
	CF	Kim Dong-Ryeol	1	0	0	0	0	0	0	0	1	0

Last updated: 30 March 2014

=== Captains ===
No.	P	Name	Country	No. games	Notes
23	FW	Jaimes McKee	(Hong Kong)	16	Captain
4	DF	Deng Jinghuang	(Hong Kong)	3	2nd Vice-captain
21	DF	Tong Kin Man	(Hong Kong)	1	1st Vice-captain

Last updated: 30 March 2014
Source: Competitive match reports.
Competitive matches only
Matches started as captain only
Country: FIFA nationality; No.: Squad number; P: Position; Name: Player name; No. Games: Number of games started as captain.

== Competitions ==
=== Overall ===
Competition	Started round	Current position / round	Final position / round	First match	Last match
Hong Kong First Division League	—	2nd		September 2013	
Senior Challenge Shield	Quarter-finals	—		October 2013	
FA Cup	Quarter-finals	—		January 2014	

Updated to match played 3 September 2013
Source: Competitions

=== First Division League ===
==== Classification ====
Pos	Team	Pld	W	D	L	GF	GA	GD	Pts	Qualification or relegation
1	Kitchee (C)	18	15	3	0	47	12	+35	48	2015 AFC Champions League play-off stage
2	Sun Pegasus	18	10	2	6	40	28	+12	32	2013–14 Hong Kong season play-off
3	South China	18	8	8	2	35	24	+11	32	2015 AFC Cup (Note: South China won the 2013–14 Hong Kong season play-off and thus qualified for the 2015 AFC Cup group stage.)
4	Royal Southern (R)	18	5	6	7	25	32	−7	21	2013–14 Hong Kong season play-off and relegation to 2014–15 Hong Kong First Division League (Note: Since the 2013–14 Hong Kong Senior Challenge Shield winners (South China) would at this point qualify for the 2013–14 Hong Kong season play-off, the 4th placed team would qualify for the Season Play-off. At the same time, Royal Southern declined to participate in the 2014–15 Hong Kong Premier League and would self-relegate in the following season.)
5	Hong Kong Rangers	18	5	6	7	23	32	−9	21	

Updated to match(es) played on 11 May 2014. Source: Hong Kong Football Association
Rules for classification: 1) points; 2) head-to-head points; 3) head-to-head goal difference; 4) head-to-head goals scored; 5) goal difference; 6) number of goals scored.
(C) Champions; (R) Relegated

==== Results summary ====
Overall								Home						Away					
Pld	W	D	L	GF	GA	GD	Pts	W	D	L	GF	GA	GD	W	D	L	GF	GA	GD
15	8	2	5	36	26	+10	26	4	0	2	18	11	+7	4	2	3	18	15	+3

Last updated: 30 March 2014.
Source: First Division

==== Results by round ====
Round	1	2	4	6	7	5	8	9	10	11	12	13	14	3	15	16	17	18	19	20	21	22
Ground	H	H	H	A	H	A	A	A	H	A	H	A	A	A	H	A	H	H	A	H	A	H
Result	V	W	W	D	V	L	W	W	L	L	L	D	V	W	L	W	W	W				
Position (Note: Sun Pegasus's position at the end of the day in which their match was played)	9	2	3	3	3	3	3	3	3	3	3	3	3	3	3	3	3	2				

Updated to match(es) played on 30 March 2014. Source: Competitive Matches
A = Away; H = Home; W = Win; D = Draw; L = Loss; V = Voided

== Matches ==
Win Draw Loss Void

=== Pre-season friendlies ===
31 July 2013	Sun Pegasus (Hong Kong)	3–2	Hong Kong U23	Kwun Tong, Kowloon
				Stadium: Sai Tso Wan Recreation Ground

7 August 2013	Gyeongju Citizen (South Korea)	1–2	(Hong Kong) Sun Pegasus	Gyeongju, Korea Republic
	11'		44' Miović; 55' Raščić	Stadium: Gyeongju Civic Stadium

9 August 2013	Pusan National University (South Korea)	1–0	(Hong Kong) Sun Pegasus	Gyeongju, Korea Republic
	Goal			Stadium: Youngchon Civic Stadium

11 August 2013	Ulsan Hyundai (South Korea)	1–0	(Hong Kong) Sun Pegasus	Gyeongju, Korea Republic
	Goal

13 August 2013	Ulsan Hyundai Mipo Dolphin (South Korea)	2–2	(Hong Kong) Sun Pegasus	Gyeongju, Korea Republic
	Goal		Ranđelović; Chan Pak Hang

=== First Division League ===
30 August 2013 Round 1	Sun Pegasus	3 – 0 (Voided)	Happy Valley	Mong Kok, Kowloon
20:00 UTC+8	Raščić 4'; Ju Yingzhi 12'; Chan Pak Hang (yellow card) 22'; Kim Dong-Ryeol 82'	Report	Tai Sze Chung (yellow card) 29'; Arce (yellow card) 47'; Cheng Chi Wing (yellow card) 57'; Li Chun Yip (yellow card) 65'; Lau Ka Shing (yellow card) 75'	Stadium: Mong Kok Stadium (Capacity: 6,680); Attendance: 2,244; Referee: Ng Chiu Kok; Assistant referees: Lam Chi Ho, Chan Siu Hung; Fourth official: Tong Kui Sum

14 September 2013 Round 2	Sun Pegasus	5–3	South China	Mong Kok, Kowloon
17:30 UTC+8	Miović 18', 61'; Ju Yingzhi 19'; Raščić 28', 73' (yellow card) 54'; Landon Ling (yellow card) 82'	Report	(yellow card) 8' Michael Luk; (yellow card) 11' Aender; 16', 23' Dhiego; 55' (pen.) Barry; (yellow card) 78' Chak Ting Fung	Stadium: Mong Kok Stadium (Capacity: 6,680); Attendance: 3,200; Referee: Ng Kai Lam; Assistant referees: Chow Chun Kit, Luk Kin Sun; Fourth official: Chan Shui Hung

22 September 2013 Round 3	Yokohama FC Hong Kong	Postponed (Note: The match originally kicks off on 22 September 2013. Due to typhoon, the match was cancelled and postponed. It has been scheduled to play at 20:00 on 26 February 2014.)	Sun Pegasus	Tseung Kwan O, New Territories
17:30 UTC+8				Stadium: Tseung Kwan O Sports Ground (Capacity: 3,500)

28 September 2013 Round 4	Sun Pegasus	2–1	Royal Southern	Mong Kok, Kowloon
17:30 UTC+8	Cesar (yellow card) 36'; Ranđelović 38'; Landon Ling (yellow card) 53'; Mbome (yellow card) 61'; Campion 76'	Report	(yellow card) 17' Chung Hong Chee; (yellow card) 20' Chiu Yu Ming; (yellow card) 55' Chan Cheuk Kwong; 72' Chow Ka Wa	Stadium: Mong Kok Stadium (Capacity: 6,680); Attendance: 1,501; Referee: Liu Kwok Man; Assistant referees: Chow Chun Kit, Lau Hong Hei; Fourth official: Yau Tsz Yeung

5 October 2013 Round 5	Sunray Cave JC Sun Hei	Postponed	Sun Pegasus	Tsing Yi, New Territories
14:30 UTC+8				Stadium: Tsing Yi Sports Ground (Capacity: 1,500)

20 October 2013 Round 6	Biu Chun Rangers	0–0	Sun Pegasus	Sham Shui Po, Kowloon
14:30 UTC+8	Chan Ming Kong (yellow card) 44'; Chuck Yiu Kwok (yellow card) 81'	Report	(yellow card) 65' Ranđelović; (yellow card) 70' (yellow-red card) 76' Landon Ling; (yellow card) 79' Raščić	Stadium: Sham Shui Po Sports Ground (Capacity: 2,194); Attendance: 566; Referee: Ho Wai Sing; Assistant referees: Yau Ho Fai, Fok Pong Sing; Fourth official: Liu Kwok Man

26 October 2013 Round 7	Sun Pegasus	6 – 0 (Voided)	Tuen Mun	Mong Kok, Kowloon
14:30 UTC+8	Raščić 12', 34', 53' (yellow card) 37'; Lo Chun Kit (yellow card) 28'; McKee 79'; Ju Yingzhi 86'	Report	(yellow card) 4' Li Ming; (yellow card) 8' Sánchez; (yellow card) 57' Hu Jun	Stadium: Mong Kok Stadium (Capacity: 6,680); Attendance: 1,443; Referee: Liu Kwok Man; Assistant referees: Lam Nai Kei, Lam Chi Ho; Fourth official: Yu Kin Fung

10 November 2013 Round 5R	Sunray Cave JC Sun Hei	3–2	Sun Pegasus	Tsing Yi, New Territories
14:30 UTC+8	Kilama (yellow card) 24'; Roberto (yellow card) 29' (yellow-red card) 64'; Mirko (yellow card) 31'; Reinaldo (yellow card) 58' (goal) 90'; So Wai Chuen 79' (o.g.); Cheung Kwok Ming 83'	Report	23' (yellow card) 65' Ju Yingzhi; (yellow card) 26' Tong Kin Man; (yellow card) 31' Campion; 46' (yellow card) 70' Landon Ling; (yellow card) 78' Miović	Stadium: Tsing Yi Sports Ground (Capacity: 1,500); Attendance: 502; Referee: Chan Shui Hung; Assistant referees: Lau Fong Hei, Yau Tsz Yeung; Fourth official: Chan Ming Siu

1 December 2013 Round 8	Eastern Salon	3–4	Sun Pegasus	Mong Kok, Kowloon
14:30 UTC+8	Cheng Siu Wai 33'; Li Haiqiang (yellow card) 45+1'; Tse Man Wing (yellow card) 52' (goal) 74'; Leung Chi Wing (yellow card) 54' (yellow-red card) 90+1'; Lau Nim Yat (yellow card) 65'; Giovane 83'	Report	(yellow card) 34' Tong Kin Man; (yellow card) 36' Ju Yingzhi; 48', 90+2' Cesar; 60' McKee; 65' (pen.) Raščić; (yellow card) 90+4' Miović	Stadium: Mong Kok Stadium (Note: The match will be played at Mong Kok Stadium instead of Eastern Salon's home ground Shing Mun Valley Sports Ground.) (Capacity: 6,680); Attendance: 1,757; Referee: Tong Kui Sum; Assistant referees: Chan Ming Siu, Fok Pong Shing; Fourth official: Lau Fong Hei

14 December 2013 Round 9	I-Sky Yuen Long	1–4	Sun Pegasus	Yuen Long, New Territories
17:30 UTC+8	Sandro (yellow card) 26'; Cheung Chi Kin (yellow card) 70'; Souza 76'	Report	27' (yellow card) 58' Ranđelović; (yellow card) 44' Mbome; 51' (pen.), 63' Raščić; (yellow card) 57' Miović; 90+4' McKee	Stadium: Yuen Long Stadium (Capacity: 4,932); Attendance: 1,056; Referee: Luk Kin Sun; Assistant referees: Yu Chun Sun, Chan Ming Siu; Fourth official: Ng Kai Lam

4 January 2014 Round 10	Sun Pegasus	0–1	Citizen	Mong Kok, Kowloon
17:30 UTC+8	Ranđelović (yellow card) 69'	Report	14' Stefan; (yellow card) 82' Nakamura; (yellow card) 90+8' Chan Hin Kwong	Stadium: Mong Kok Stadium (Capacity: 6,680); Attendance: 1,256; Referee: Tong Kui Sum; Assistant referees: Chow Chun Kit, Lam Nai Kei; Fourth official: Leung Chung Yin

19 January 2014 Round 11	Kitchee	3–1	Sun Pegasus	Mong Kok, Kowloon
14:30 UTC+8	Annan 14'; Huang Yang (yellow card) 33'; Recio (yellow card) 65'; Belencoso 80', 83'; Jang Kyung-Jin (yellow card) 88'	Report	(yellow card) 23' Deng Jinghuang; 89' (pen.) Raščić; (yellow card) 90+1' Tong Kin Man; (yellow card) 90+3' Mbome	Stadium: Mong Kok Stadium (Capacity: 6,680); Attendance: 2,742; Referee: Ho Wai Sing; Assistant referees: Luk Kin Sun, Yau Ho Fai; Fourth official: Lau Fong Hei

8 February 2014 Round 12	Sun Pegasus	1–2	Kitchee	Mong Kok, Kowloon
14:30 UTC+8	Raščić 5'; Wong Yim Kwan (yellow card) 53'; Deng Jinghuang (yellow card) 82'	Report	21' Recio; 72' Belencoso	Stadium: Mong Kok Stadium (Capacity: 6,680); Attendance: 2,101; Referee: Ng Chiu Kok; Assistant referees: Chow Chun Kit, Lam Nai Kei; Fourth official: Chan Ming Siu

16 February 2014 Round 13	Tuen Mun	Cancelled	Sun Pegasus	Tuen Mun, New Territories
14:30 UTC+8				Stadium: Tuen Mun Tang Shiu Kin Sports Ground (Capacity: 2,200)

22 February 2014 Round 14	South China	2–2	Sun Pegasus	So Kon Po, Hong Kong Island
17:30 UTC+8	Tse 5' (yellow card) 32'; Lee Chi Ho (yellow card) 28'; João Emir (yellow card) 40'; Kajkut 80'	Report	6' Raščić; (yellow card) 45+3' Mbome; 90+6' Ranđelović; (yellow card) 90+6' Cesar	Stadium: Hong Kong Stadium (Capacity: 40,000); Attendance: 1,632; Referee: Liu Kwok Man; Assistant referees: Lam Nai Kei, Lui Siu Chuen; Fourth official: Lau Fong Hei

26 February 2014 Round 3R	Yokohama FC Hong Kong	1–3	Sun Pegasus	Tseung Kwan O, New Territories
20:00 UTC+8	Ideguchi (yellow card) 32'; Cesar 61' (o.g.)	Report	(yellow card) 11' (goal) 85' Ju Yingzhi; 51' Miović; 58' Raščić	Stadium: Tseung Kwan O Sports Ground (Capacity: 3,500); Attendance: 257; Referee: Luk Kin Sun; Assistant referees: Lui Siu Chuen, Yau Ho Fai; Fourth official: Lo Ming Leong

9 March 2014 Round 15	Sun Pegasus	1–3	Sunray Cave JC Sun Hei	Mong Kok, Kowloon
17:30 UTC+8	So Wai Chuen (yellow card) 32'; Miović (yellow card) 45'; Deng Jinghuang (yellow card) 69'; Raščić 72'	Report	(yellow card) 8' Zhang Jun; 12' Lai Yiu Cheong; (yellow card) 50' Yuen Tsun Nam; 59' Reinaldo; 64' Lugo; (yellow card) 77' Su Yang; 79' Kilama	Stadium: Mong Kok Stadium (Capacity: 6,680); Attendance: 1,012; Referee: Ng Kai Lam; Assistant referees: Cheng Oi Cho, Fok Pong Shing; Fourth official: Yu Chun Sun

15 March 2014 Round 16	Royal Southern	1–2	Sun Pegasus	Aberdeen, Hong Kong Island
14:30 UTC+8	Carril 37' (pen.) (yellow card) 87'; Ip Chung Long (yellow card) 55'; Chung Hong Chee (yellow card) 77'<>James Ha (yellow card) 90+4'	Report	(yellow card) 36' Škorić; (yellow card) 42' Mbome; 63' McKee; (yellow card) 86' Miović; 89' Ranđelović	Stadium: Aberdeen Sports Ground (Capacity: 4,000); Attendance: 526; Referee: Ho Wai Sing; Assistant referees: Chow Chun Kit, Yau Tsz Yeung; Fourth official: Tang Hing Fu

22 March 2014 Round 17	Sun Pegasus	4–0	I-Sky Yuen Long	Mong Kok, Kowloon
17:30 UTC+8	Raščić 14' (pen.); Ranđelović (yellow card) 42'; So Wai Chuen 57'; Deng Jinghuang 62'; Yip Tsz Chun 76'	Report	(yellow card) 12' Mijanović; (yellow card) 27' Chan Ka Chun; (yellow card) 32' Cheung Chi Yung; (yellow card) 63' Fung Kai Hong	Stadium: Mong Kok Stadium (Capacity: 6,680); Attendance: 1,005; Referee: Chan Ming Siu; Assistant referees: Lam Nai Kei, Yau Ho Fai; Fourth official: Cheng Oi Cho

30 March 2014 Round 18	Sun Pegasus	5–2	Eastern Salon	Mong Kok, Kowloon
14:30 UTC+8	Yip Tsz Chun 2'; Tong Kin Man (yellow card) 10'; McKee (yellow card) 43' (goal) 45+1', 82'; Ju Yingzhi 48'; Raščić 53'; Škorić (yellow card) 76'; Wong Yim Kwan (yellow card) 85'	Report	(yellow card) 12' Tse Man Wing; (yellow card) 62' Macallister; 76' Giovane; 85' Beto	Stadium: Mong Kok Stadium (Capacity: 6,680); Attendance: 1,465; Referee: Ng Kai Lam; Assistant referees: Chow Chun Kit, Sarao Amarjit Singh; Fourth official: Tang Hing Fu

6 April 2014 Round 19	Happy Valley	Cancelled	Sun Pegasus	Siu Sai Wan, Hong Kong Island
17:30 UTC+8				Stadium: Siu Sai Wan Sports Ground (Capacity: 12,000)

19 April 2014 Round 20	Sun Pegasus	v	Yokohama FC Hong Kong	Mong Kok, Kowloon
17:30 UTC+8				Stadium: Mong Kok Stadium (Capacity: 6,680)

4 May 2014 Round 21	Citizen	v	Sun Pegasus	Tsing Yi, New Territories
17:30 UTC+8				Stadium: Tsing Yi Sports Ground (Capacity: 1,500)

10–11 May 2014 Round 22	Sun Pegasus	v	Biu Chun Rangers	Mong Kok, Kowloon
TBC				Stadium: Mong Kok Stadium (Capacity: 6,680)

=== Senior Shield ===
3 November 2013 1st round	Yokohama FC Hong Kong	1–4	Sun Pegasus	Mong Kok, Kowloon
17:30 UTC+8	Lee Ka Ho (yellow card) 11'; Leung Kwun Chung (yellow card) 17'; Fukuda 47'; Fong Pak Lun (yellow card) 59'	Report	25', 45' Raščić; (yellow card) 28' Lo Chun Kit; 61', 88' McKee	Stadium: Mong Kok Stadium (Capacity: 6,680); Attendance: 991; Referee: Ng Chiu Kok; Assistant referees: Cheng Oi Cho, Chow Chun Kit; Fourth official: Yau Tsz Yeung

8 December 2013 Quarter-finals	Happy Valley	0–1	Sun Pegasus	Mong Kok, Kowloon
17:30 UTC+8	Leung Man Lai (yellow card) 23'; Abálsamo (yellow card) 55'; Mus (yellow card) 69'; Acosta (yellow card) 69'; Fan Weijun (yellow card) 81'	Report	23' (yellow card) 39' Raščić; (yellow card) 74' Miović	Stadium: Mong Kok Stadium (Capacity: 6,680); Attendance: 619; Referee: Chan Shiu Hung; Assistant referees: Lau Fong Hei, Lam Nai Kei; Fourth official: Chan Shing Kin

26 December 2013 Semi-finals	Sun Pegasus	3–2 (a.e.t.)	Royal Southern	Mong Kok, Kowloon
14:30 UTC+8	Miović (yellow card) 35'; Chan Pak Hang 45+1'; Ju Yingzhi 78', 109' (yellow card) 109'; Landon Ling (yellow card) 85'	Report	(yellow card) 54' (yellow-red card) 103' Li Ngai Hoi; 64' (o.g.) Mbome; 76' Carril; (yellow card) 88' Yago; (yellow card) 90+5' Che Runqiu; (yellow card) 109' Dieguito; (yellow card) 119' Ip Chung Long	Stadium: Mong Kok Stadium (Capacity: 6,680); Attendance: 2,501; Referee: Tong Kui Sum; Assistant referees: Lau Fong Hei, Lui Siu Chuen; Fourth official: Yu Kin Fung

12 January 2014 Final	Sun Pegasus	1–2	South China	So Kon Po, Hong Kong Island
16:00 UTC+8	McKee 12'; Cesar (yellow card) 30'; Bai He (yellow card) 37'; Deng Jinghuang (yellow card) 47'; Raščić (yellow card) 48'; Mbome (yellow card) 77'	Report	(yellow card) 59' Chak Ting Fung; (yellow card) 60' Ticão; 70' (yellow card) 42' (yellow-red card) 81' Kajkut; 74' Barisic	Stadium: Hong Kong Stadium (Capacity: 40,000); Attendance: 6,820; Referee: Ng Chiu Kok; Assistant referees: Lam Nai Kei, Lam Chi Ho; Fourth official: Ho Wai Sing; Man of the Match: Andrew Barisic (South China)

=== FA Cup ===
25 March 2014 Round of 16	South China	3–2	Sun Pegasus	Mong Kok, Kowloon
20:00 (UTC+8)	Tse (yellow card) 37'; Kajkut (yellow card) 45+2' (goal) 71' (pen.); Kwok Kin Pong (yellow card) 52'; Barisic 52', 90+2' (yellow card) 72'	Report	10' (yellow card) 75' Ju Yingzhi; 19' McKee; (yellow card) 37' Mbome; (yellow card) 49' Tong Kin Man; (yellow card) 75' So Wai Chuen	Stadium: Mong Kok Stadium (Capacity: 6,680); Attendance: 2,055; Referee: Tong Kui Sum; Assistant referees: Chow Chun Kit, Lam Chi Ho; Fourth official: Luk Kin Sun
