= 2013–14 Hong Kong season play-off =

Tournament

Hong Kong season play-off
- Season: 2013–14
- Champions: South China
- Matches: 3
- Goals: 10 (3.33 per match)
- Total attendance: 7,595
- Average attendance: 2,531

The 2013–14 season play-off for the 2013–14 Hong Kong football season was the second season of the tournament. It was held in May 2014. All matches were played at the Mong Kok Stadium in Mong Kok, Kowloon.

The play-off semi-finals were played as single elimination ties, contested by the teams who finished in 2nd and 3rd place in the First Division League table, the winners of the Senior Challenge Shield and the champions of the FA Cup. The winners of the semi-finals go through to the finals, with the winner of the final gaining participation for the 2015 AFC Cup group stage.

== Qualified teams ==
=== First Division League ===
Pos	Team	Pld	W	D	L	GF	GA	GD	Pts	Qualification or relegation
1	Kitchee (C)	18	15	3	0	47	12	+35	48	2015 AFC Champions League play-off stage
2	Sun Pegasus	18	10	2	6	40	28	+12	32	2013–14 Hong Kong season play-off
3	South China	18	8	8	2	35	24	+11	32	2015 AFC Cup (Note: South China won the 2013–14 Hong Kong season play-off and thus qualified for the 2015 AFC Cup group stage.)
4	Royal Southern (R)	18	5	6	7	25	32	−7	21	2013–14 Hong Kong season play-off and relegation to 2014–15 Hong Kong First Division League (Note: Since the 2013–14 Hong Kong Senior Challenge Shield winners (South China) would at this point qualify for the 2013–14 Hong Kong season play-off, the 4th placed team would qualify for the Season Play-off. At the same time, Royal Southern declined to participate in the 2014–15 Hong Kong Premier League and would self-relegate in the following season.)
5	Hong Kong Rangers	18	5	6	7	23	32	−9	21	
6	Eastern Salon	18	5	6	7	34	37	−3	21	2013–14 Hong Kong season play-off (Note: Eastern Salon qualified for the 2013–14 Hong Kong season play-off as winners of the 2013–14 Hong Kong FA Cup.)
7	I-Sky Yuen Long	18	5	5	8	25	33	−8	20	
8	Sunray Cave JC Sun Hei (R)	18	5	4	9	32	41	−9	19	Relegation to 2014–15 Hong Kong First Division League (Note: Sunray Cave JC Sun Hei & Citizen declined to participate in the 2014–15 Hong Kong Premier League and would self-relegate in the following season.)
9	Citizen (R)	18	4	6	8	25	33	−8	18	Relegation to 2014–15 Hong Kong First Division League
10	Yokohama FC Hong Kong	18	3	4	11	25	39	−14	13	
11	Happy Valley (D, R)	0	0	0	0	0	0	0	0	Excluded, record expunged Relegation to 2014–15 Hong Kong First Division League (Note: On 13 February 2014, the HKFA announced that as a result of a match-fixing investigation, both Tuen Mun and Happy Valley would be excluded from the league, and their records would be expunged.)
12	Tuen Mun (D, R)	0	0	0	0	0	0	0	0	Excluded, record expunged Relegation to 2014–15 Hong Kong First Division League

Updated to match(es) played on 11 May 2014. Source: Hong Kong Football Association
Rules for classification: 1) points; 2) head-to-head points; 3) head-to-head goal difference; 4) head-to-head goals scored; 5) goal difference; 6) number of goals scored.
(C) Champions; (D) Disqualified; (R) Relegated
Notes:

Qualified teams:

- Sun Pegasus
- Royal Southern

=== Senior Challenge Shield ===
The winners of the Senior Challenge Shield will guarantee a place in the play-off.

Winners:

- South China

=== FA Cup ===
The winners of the FA Cup will guarantee a place in the play-off.

Winners:

- Eastern Salon

== Calendar ==
Round	Draw Date	Date	Matches	Clubs
Semi-finals	TBC	24–25 May 2014	2	4 → 2
Final	TBC	31 May 2014 at Mong Kok Stadium	1	2 → 1

== Bracket ==
Semi-finals
Royal Southern	2
Eastern Salon	3
Sun Pegasus	1
South China	3

Final
Eastern Salon	0
South China	1

== Fixtures and results ==
=== Semi-finals ===
==== Sun Pegasus vs South China ====
30 May 2013	Sun Pegasus	1 – 3	South China	Mong Kok, Kowloon
20:00(GMT+8)		Report		Stadium: Mong Kok Stadium (Capacity:6,680); Attendance: 2,461; Referee: Ho Wai Sing

Sun Pegasus	South China

EASTERN SALON:
GK	1	(Hong Kong) Ng Yat Hoi^{LP}
RB	21	(Hong Kong) Tong Kin Man^{LP}
CB	20	(Serbia) Igor Miović^{FP}
CB	5	(Brazil) Paulo Cesar^{FP}
LB	18	(Hong Kong) Wong Yim Kwan^{LP}
DM	10	(Cameroon) Eugene Mbome^{FP}
CM	24	(Hong Kong) Ju Yingzhi^{LP}
AM	29	(Serbia) Aleksandar Ranđelović^{FP}
RW	23	(Hong Kong) Jaimes McKee^{LP} (c)
LW	17	(Hong Kong) Chan Pak Hang^{LP}
FW	9	(Bosnia and Herzegovina) Admir Raščić^{FP}
Substitutes:
GK	32	(Croatia) Josip Škorić^{FP}
DF	7	(Canada) Landon Ling^{LP}
FW	11	(Australia) Marko Jesic^{FP}
FW	19	(China) Yuan Yang^{LP}
DF	33	(Hong Kong) So Wai Chuen^{LP}
FW	20	(Hong Kong) Li Ka Chun^{LP}
MF	29	(Hong Kong) Yiu Hok Man^{LP}
Coach:
(Brazil) Cristiano Cordeiro

SOUTH CHINA:
GK	39	(Hong Kong) Leung Hing Kit^{LP}	(yellow card) 90+5'
RB	5	(Hong Kong) Chak Ting Fung^{LP}		(substituted off) 60'
CB	15	(Hong Kong) Chan Wai Ho^{LP} (c)
CB	2	(Hong Kong) Lee Chi Ho^{LP}
LB	18	(Hong Kong) Kwok Kin Pong^{LP}
DM	21	(Hong Kong) Leung Chun Pong^{LP}
CM	8	(Brazil) Ticão^{FP}
RM	19	(Brazil) Dhiego Martins^{FP}
LM	17	(Hong Kong) Lee Hong Lim^{LP}		(substituted off) 81'
SS	7	(Hong Kong) Chan Siu Ki^{LP}	(yellow card) 90+4'
FW	11	(Bosnia and Herzegovina) Saša Kajkut^{FP}		(substituted off) 60'
Substitutes:
GK	1	(Hong Kong) Yapp Hung Fai^{LP}
DF	4	(Republic of Ireland) Sean Tse Ka Keung^{LP}		(substituted on) 81'
MF	9	(Hong Kong) Lee Wai Lim^{LP}
MF	10	(Brazil) João Emir Porto Pereira^{FP}		(substituted on) 60'
MF	24	(Hong Kong) Lo Kong Wai^{LP}
FW	27	(Australia) Andrew Barisic^{FP}	(yellow card) 72'	(substituted on) 60'
DF	37	(South Korea) Ko Kyung-Joon^{FP}
Coach:
(Hong Kong) Yeung Ching Kwong

MATCH OFFICIALS

- Assistant referees:
  - Lam Nai Kei
  - Chow Chun Kit
- Fourth official: Luk Kin Sun
- ^{LP} Local Player
- ^{FP} Foreign Player

MATCH RULES

- 90 minutes.
- 30 minutes of extra-time if necessary.
- Penalty shoot-out if scores still level.
- Seven named substitutes
- Maximum of 3 substitutions.

==== Royal Southern vs Eastern Salon ====
25 May 2013	Royal Southern	2 – 3	Eastern Salon	Mong Kok, Kowloon
17:30(GMT+8)		Report		Stadium: Mong Kok Stadium (Capacity:6,680); Attendance: 1,057; Referee: Liu Kwok Man

Royal Southern	Eastern Salon

TUEN MUN:
GK	1	(Hong Kong) Cheng Ting Hei^{LP}
RB	2	(Hong Kong) Lam Ho Kwan^{LP}
CB	3	(Spain) Héctor^{FP}
CB	5	(Spain) Rubén^{FP} (c)
LB	22	(Hong Kong) Che Runqiu^{LP}
DM	31	(Spain) Díaz^{FP}
CM	27	(Hong Kong) Lo Wai Tat^{LP}
CM	33	(Hong Kong) Ip Chung Long^{LP}
RW	10	(Spain) Dieguito^{FP}
LW	11	(Hong Kong) Lo Chi Kwan^{LP}
CF	9	(Spain) Carril^{FP}
Substitutes:
GK	38	(Hong Kong) Zhang Chunhui^{LP}
FW	8	(Spain) Yago^{FP}
MF	14	(Hong Kong) Tsang Tsz Hin^{LP}
MF	15	(Hong Kong) Chan Cheuk Kwong^{LP}
MF	16	(Hong Kong) Ngan Lok Fung^{LP}
FW	20	(Hong Kong) James Ha^{LP}
MF	21	(Hong Kong) Kwok Ting Him^{LP}
Coach:
(Hong Kong) Fung Hoi Man

WOFOO TAI PO:
GK	1	(Brazil) Paulo^{FP}
RB	12	(Hong Kong) Man Pei Tak^{LP}
CB	15	(Brazil) Beto^{FP}
CB	5	(Brazil) Clayton Michel Afonso^{FP}
LB	33	(Hong Kong) Leung Chi Wing^{LP} (c)
DM	3	(Brazil) Diego^{FP}
CM	11	(Hong Kong) Li Haiqiang^{LP}
AM	29	(Hong Kong) Yiu Hok Man^{LP}
RW	18	(China) Liang Zicheng^{LP}
LW	26	(Hong Kong) Leung Tsz Chun^{LP}
FW	22	(Brazil) Giovane^{FP}
Substitutes:
GK	17	(Hong Kong) Li Hon Ho^{LP}
DF	6	(Hong Kong) Wong Chin Hung^{LP}
MF	8	(Hong Kong) Lee Sze Ming^{LP}
FW	9	(Australia) Macallister^{FP}
MF	10	(Brazil) Itaparica^{FP}
DF	13	(Hong Kong) Tse Man Wing^{LP}
CF	19	(Hong Kong) Cheng Siu Wai^{LP}
Coach:
(Brazil) Cristiano Cordeiro

MATCH OFFICIALS

- Assistant referees:
  - Chan Shui Hung
  - Lam Chi Ho
- Fourth official: Chan Ming Siu
- ^{LP} Local Player
- ^{FP} Foreign Player

MATCH RULES

- 90 minutes.
- 30 minutes of extra-time if necessary.
- Penalty shoot-out if scores still level.
- Seven named substitutes
- Maximum of 3 substitutions.

=== Final ===
==== Eastern Salon vs South China ====
30 May 2013	Eastern Salon	0 – 1	South China	Mong Kok, Kowloon
20:00(GMT+8)		Report	65' Dhiego Martins	Stadium: Mong Kok Stadium (Capacity:6,680); Attendance: 4,077; Referee: Tong Kui Sum

Eastern Salon	South China

EASTERN SALON:
GK	1	(Brazil) Paulo César^{FP}		(substituted off) 80'
RB	12	(Hong Kong) Man Pei Tak^{LP}
CB	28	(Hong Kong) Wong Chi Chung^{LP}	(yellow card) 19'
CB	5	(Brazil) Clayton Michel Afonso^{FP}
LB	33	(Hong Kong) Leung Chi Wing^{LP} (c)		(substituted off) 80'
RM	18	(China) Liang Zicheng^{LP}
DM	3	(Brazil) Diego Eli Moreira^{FP}
CM	11	(Hong Kong) Li Haiqiang^{LP}
LM	26	(Hong Kong) Leung Tsz Chun^{LP}		(substituted off) 69'
FW	22	(Brazil) Giovane Silva^{FP}
FW	9	(Australia) Dylan Macallister^{FP}
Substitutes:
GK	17	(Hong Kong) Li Hon Ho^{LP}		(substituted on) 80'
DF	6	(Hong Kong) Wong Chin Hung^{LP}
DF	13	(Hong Kong) Tse Man Wing^{LP}
CB	15	(Brazil) Beto^{FP}		(substituted on) 80'
CF	19	(Hong Kong) Cheng Siu Wai^{LP}	(yellow card) 89'	(substituted on) 69'
FW	20	(Hong Kong) Li Ka Chun^{LP}
MF	29	(Hong Kong) Yiu Hok Man^{LP}
Coach:
(Brazil) Cristiano Cordeiro

SOUTH CHINA:
GK	39	(Hong Kong) Leung Hing Kit^{LP}	(yellow card) 90+5'
RB	5	(Hong Kong) Chak Ting Fung^{LP}		(substituted off) 60'
CB	15	(Hong Kong) Chan Wai Ho^{LP} (c)
CB	2	(Hong Kong) Lee Chi Ho^{LP}
LB	18	(Hong Kong) Kwok Kin Pong^{LP}
DM	21	(Hong Kong) Leung Chun Pong^{LP}
CM	8	(Brazil) Ticão^{FP}
RM	19	(Brazil) Dhiego Martins^{FP}
LM	17	(Hong Kong) Lee Hong Lim^{LP}		(substituted off) 81'
SS	7	(Hong Kong) Chan Siu Ki^{LP}	(yellow card) 90+4'
FW	11	(Bosnia and Herzegovina) Saša Kajkut^{FP}		(substituted off) 60'
Substitutes:
GK	1	(Hong Kong) Yapp Hung Fai^{LP}
DF	4	(Republic of Ireland) Sean Tse Ka Keung^{LP}		(substituted on) 81'
MF	9	(Hong Kong) Lee Wai Lim^{LP}
MF	10	(Brazil) João Emir Porto Pereira^{FP}		(substituted on) 60'
MF	24	(Hong Kong) Lo Kong Wai^{LP}
FW	27	(Australia) Andrew Barisic^{FP}	(yellow card) 72'	(substituted on) 60'
DF	37	(South Korea) Ko Kyung-Joon^{FP}
Coach:
(Hong Kong) Yeung Ching Kwong

MATCH OFFICIALS

- Assistant referees:
  - Lam Nai Kei
  - Chow Chun Kit
- Fourth official: Luk Kin Sun
- ^{LP} Local Player
- ^{FP} Foreign Player

MATCH RULES

- 90 minutes.
- 30 minutes of extra-time if necessary.
- Penalty shoot-out if scores still level.
- Seven named substitutes
- Maximum of 3 substitutions.
