= 2013–14 Hong Kong Senior Shield =

Tournament details
- Country: Hong Kong
- Teams: 12

Final positions
- Champions: South China (31st title)
- Runners-up: Sun Pegasus

Tournament statistics
- Matches played: 11
- Goals scored: 42 (3.82 per match)
- Attendance: 21,062 (1,915 per match)
- Top goal scorer: Giovane Silva (Eastern Salon) (4 goals)

Awards
- Best player: Andrew Barisic (South China)

2013–14 Hong Kong Senior Shield was the 112th season of one of the oldest football knockout competitions in Asia, Hong Kong Senior Shield. Unlike last two seasons, the competition was played in single-legged tie.

The winner guaranteed a place in the 2013–14 Hong Kong season play-off.

== Calendar ==
Stage	Round	Date
Knockout	First round	2 – 10 November 2013
Knockout	Quarter-final	7–8 December 2013
Knockout	Semi-final	25 – 26 December 2013
Knockout	Final	12 January 2014 at Hong Kong Stadium

== Bracket ==
First round
Yokohama FC Hong Kong	1
Sun Pegasus	4
Sunray Cave JC Sun Hei	2
Tuen Mun	1
Eastern Salon	3
I-Sky Yuen Long	1
Kitchee	1
Biu Chun Rangers	2

Quarter-finals
Happy Valley	0
Sun Pegasus	1
Royal Southern	2
Sunray Cave JC Sun Hei	1
Citizen	3 (2)
Eastern Salon (p)	3 (4)
South China	3
Biu Chun Rangers	1

Semi-finals
Sun Pegasus	3
Royal Southern	2
Eastern Salon	2
South China	3

Final
Sun Pegasus	1
South China	2

== Fixtures and results ==
=== First round ===
2 November 2013	Sunray Cave JC Sun Hei	2 – 1 (a.e.t.)	Tuen Mun	Mong Kok, Kowloon
14:30 UTC+8	Reinaldo 14', 111'; Mirko (yellow card) 44'; Wong Chun Ho (yellow card) 87' (yellow-red card) 120+2'; Su Yang (yellow card) 90+4'; Yuen Tsun Nam (yellow card) 96'; Roberto (yellow card) 120+1'	Report	59' Ling Cong; (yellow card) 90+1' Petar; (yellow card) 103' Tsang Chiu Tat	Stadium: Mong Kok Stadium (Capacity: 6,680); Attendance: 702; Referee: Luk Kin Sun; Assistant referees: Cheng Oi Cho, Chow Chun Kit; Fourth official: Yau Tsz Yeung

3 November 2013	Yokohama FC Hong Kong	1 – 4	Sun Pegasus	Mong Kok, Kowloon
17:30 UTC+8	Lee Ka Ho (yellow card) 11'; Leung Kwun Chung (yellow card) 17'; Fukuda 47'; Fong Pak Lun (yellow card) 59'	Report	25', 45' Raščić; (yellow card) 28' Lo Chun Kit; 61', 88' McKee	Stadium: Mong Kok Stadium (Capacity: 6,680); Attendance: 991; Referee: Ng Chiu Kok; Assistant referees: Chan Ming Siu, Tang Hing Fu; Fourth official: Ho Wai Sing

9 November 2013	Kitchee	1 – 2	Biu Chun Rangers	Mong Kok, Kowloon
14:30 UTC+8	Rehman (yellow card) 43'; Lam Ka Wai (yellow card) 64'; Jordi 70'; Dani (yellow card) 85'	Report	2' Lee Kil-Hoon; (yellow card) 43' Tomas; 55' Lam Hok Hei	Stadium: Mong Kok Stadium (Capacity: 6,680); Attendance: 1,099; Referee: Tong Kui Sum; Assistant referees: Lam Chi Ho, Yu Kin Fung; Fourth official: Tang Hing Fu

10 November 2013	Eastern Salon	3 – 1	I-Sky Yuen Long	Mong Kok, Kowloon
17:30 UTC+8	Beto 7'; Giovane 19', 90+2'; Diego (yellow card) 45+3'; Man Pei Tak (yellow card) 75'; Lau Nim Yat (yellow card) 89'	Report	22' Fábio; (red card) 45+2' Sandro; (yellow card) 52' Marques; (yellow card) 88' Souza; (yellow card) 90+1' Cheung Tsz Kin	Stadium: Mong Kok Stadium (Capacity: 6,680); Attendance: 849; Referee: Cheng Oi Cho; Assistant referees: Lam Nai Kei, Sarao Amarjit Singh; Fourth official: Lam Chi Ho

=== Quarter-finals ===
6 December 2013 QF1	South China	3 – 1	Biu Chun Rangers	Mong Kok, Kowloon
20:00 UTC+8	João Emir (yellow card) 22' (goal) 49'; Sealy (yellow card) 26'; Dhiego 90+1' (pen.); Lee Wai Lim 90+3'	Report	(yellow card) 35' (goal) 61' Schutz; (yellow card) 58' Lee Kil-Hoon; (yellow card) 72' Lai Ka Fai	Stadium: Mong Kok Stadium (Capacity: 6,680); Attendance: 1,449; Referee: Lui Siu Chuen; Assistant referees: Luk Kin Sun, Fok Pong Shing; Fourth official: Tang Hing Fu

7 December 2013 QF2	Royal Southern	2 – 1	Sunray Cave JC Sun Hei	Mong Kok, Kowloon
14:30 UTC+8	Carril 6', 33'; Li Ngai Hoi (yellow card) 49'; Dieguito (yellow card) 65'; Chow Ka Wa (yellow card) 90+2'	Report	(yellow card) 12' Jing Teng; (yellow card) 53' Zhang Jun; 89' Yuen Tsun Nam	Stadium: Mong Kok Stadium (Capacity: 6,680); Attendance: 933; Referee: Tong Kui Sum; Assistant referees: Yau Ho Fai, Chan Ming Siu; Fourth official: Chow Chun Kit

8 December 2013 QF3	Citizen	3 – 3 (a.e.t.) (2 – 4 p)	Eastern Salon	Tseung Kwan O, New Territories
14:30 UTC+8	Chan Hin Kwong (yellow card) 18'; Fernando (yellow card) 25'; Sham Kwok Fai 33'; Nakamura (yellow card) 49' (yellow-red card) 54'; Sham Kwok Keung 58', 90+3'; Hélio (yellow card) 72' (yellow-red card) 107'	Report	(yellow card) 22' Clayton; (yellow card) 45+1' (red card) 49' Lau Nim Yat; (yellow card) 50' Diego; (yellow card) 51' Yiu Hok Man; (yellow card) 52' (goal) 58' Beto; 61', 68' Giovane; (yellow card) 92' Tse Man Wing; (yellow card) 96' Leung Kwok Wai	Stadium: Tseung Kwan O Sports Ground (Capacity: 3,500); Attendance: 471; Referee: Ng Chiu Kok; Assistant referees: Chow Chun Kit, Yu Chun Sun; Fourth official: Law Bik Chi
	Penalties
	Detinho (penalty scored); Krasić (penalty scored); Paulinho (penalty missed); Sham Kwok Keung (penalty missed)		(penalty scored) Beto; (penalty missed) Clayton; (penalty scored) Giovane; (penalty scored) Leung Tsz Chun; (penalty scored) Diego

8 December 2013 QF4	Happy Valley	0 – 1	Sun Pegasus	Mong Kok, Kowloon
17:30 UTC+8	Leung Man Lai (yellow card) 23'; Abálsamo (yellow card) 55'; Mus (yellow card) 69'; Acosta (yellow card) 69'; Fan Weijun (yellow card) 81'	Report	23' (yellow card) 39' Raščić; (yellow card) 74' Miović	Stadium: Mong Kok Stadium (Capacity: 6,680); Attendance: 619; Referee: Chan Shiu Hung; Assistant referees: Lau Fong Hei, Lam Nai Kei; Fourth official: Chan Shing Kin

=== Semi-finals ===
25 December 2013 SF1	Eastern Salon	2 – 3 (a.e.t.)	South China	Mong Kok, Kowloon
15:00 UTC+8	Tse Man Wing (yellow card) 11'; Paulo (yellow card) 61'; Itaparica (yellow card) 81'; Beto 88'; Leung Chi Wing (yellow card) 102'; Wong Chin Hung 117'	Report	6' João Emir; (yellow card) 61' Ko Kyung-Joon; (yellow card) 87' (goal) 107' Ticão; (yellow card) 95' Dhiego; 105+1' Lee Wai Lim	Stadium: Mong Kok Stadium (Capacity: 6,680); Attendance: 4,628; Referee: Liu Kwok Man; Assistant referees: Luk Kin Sun, Lam Nai Kei; Fourth official: Tang Hing Fu

26 December 2013 SF2	Sun Pegasus	3 – 2 (a.e.t.)	Royal Southern	Mong Kok, Kowloon
14:30 UTC+8	Miović (yellow card) 35'; Chan Pak Hang 45+1'; Ju Yingzhi 78', 109' (yellow card) 109'; Landon Ling (yellow card) 85'	Report	(yellow card) 54' (yellow-red card) 103' Li Ngai Hoi; 64' (o.g.) Mbome; 76' Carril; (yellow card) 88' Yago; (yellow card) 90+5' Che Runqiu; (yellow card) 109' Dieguito; (yellow card) 119' Ip Chung Long	Stadium: Mong Kok Stadium (Capacity: 6,680); Attendance: 2,501; Referee: Tong Kui Sum; Assistant referees: Lau Fong Hei, Lui Siu Chuen; Fourth official: Yu Kin Fung

=== Final ===
12 January 2014 Final	Sun Pegasus	1 – 2	South China	So Kon Po, Hong Kong Island
16:00 UTC+8	McKee 12'	Report	70' Kajkut; 74' Barisic	Stadium: Hong Kong Stadium (Capacity:40,000); Attendance: 6,820; Referee: Ng Chiu Kok; Man of the Match: Andrew Barisic (South China)

Sun Pegasus	South China

SUN PEGASUS:
GK	32	(Croatia) Josip Skoric^{FP}
RB	21	(Hong Kong) Tong Kin Man^{LP}
CB	20	(Serbia) Igor Miović^{FP}
CB	5	(Brazil) Paulo Cesar^{LP}	(yellow card) 30'	(substituted off) 76'
LB	4	(Hong Kong) Deng Jinghuang^{LP}	(yellow card) 47'
DM	6	(Hong Kong) Bai He^{LP}	(yellow card) 37'
DM	10	(Cameroon) Eugene Mbome^{FP}	(yellow card) 77'	(substituted off) 83'
LW	23	(Hong Kong) Jaimes McKee (c) ^{LP}
CM	17	(Hong Kong) Chan Pak Hang^{LP}		(substituted off) 72'
RW	24	(Hong Kong) Ju Yingzhi^{LP}
CF	9	(Bosnia and Herzegovina) Admir Raščić^{FP}	(yellow card) 48'
Substitutes:
GK	1	(Hong Kong) Ng Yat Hoi^{LP}
DF	7	(Canada) Landon Ling^{LP}		(substituted on) 72'
DF	33	(Hong Kong) So Wai Chuen^{LP}
MF	28	(Hong Kong) Lo Chun Kit^{LP}
MF	29	(Serbia) Aleksandar Ranđelović^{FP}		(substituted on) 76'
FW	11	(Australia) Marko Jesic^{FP}		(substituted on) 83'
FW	14	(Hong Kong) Tsui Hoi Kin^{LP}
Head Coach:
(Hong Kong) Chan Chi Hong

SOUTH CHINA:
GK	1	(Hong Kong) Yapp Hung Fai^{LP}
RB	5	(Hong Kong) Chak Ting Fung^{LP}	(yellow card) 59'
CB	2	(Hong Kong) Lee Chi Ho^{LP}
CB	15	(Hong Kong) Chan Wai Ho (c) ^{LP}
LB	18	(Hong Kong) Kwok Kin Pong^{LP}
RM	19	(Brazil) Dhiego Martins^{FP}		(substituted off) 24'
DM	4	(Hong Kong) Sean Tse^{LP}		(substituted off) 67'
CM	8	(Brazil) Ticão^{FP}	(yellow card) 60'
LM	14	(Netherlands) Vincent Weijl^{FP}		(substituted off) 85'
SS	27	(Australia) Andrew Barisic^{FP}
CF	11	(Bosnia and Herzegovina) Sasa Kajkut^{FP}	(yellow card) 42' (yellow-red card) 81'
Substitutes:
GK	28	(Hong Kong) Zhang Chunhui^{LP}
DF	37	(South Korea) Ko Kyung-Joon^{FP}		(substituted on) 85'
MF	10	(Brazil) João Emir^{FP}		(substituted on) 67'
MF	16	(Hong Kong) Chan Siu Kwan^{LP}
MF	17	(Hong Kong) Lee Hong Lim^{LP}		(substituted on) 24'
MF	24	(Hong Kong) Lo Kong Wai^{LP}
FW	31	(Hong Kong) Cheng Lai Hin^{LP}
Head Coach:
(Hong Kong) Cheung Po Chun

MATCH OFFICIALS

- Assistant referees:
  - Lam Nai Kei
  - Lam Chi Ho
- Fourth official: Ho Wai Sing
- ^{LP} Local Player
- ^{FP} Foreign Player

MATCH RULES

- 90 minutes. (1st Half Added Time: 2 mins, 2nd Half Added Time: min)
- 30 minutes of extra-time if necessary.
- Penalty shoot-out if scores still level.
- Seven named substitutes
- Maximum of 3 substitutions.

== Scorer ==
The scorers in the 2013–14 Hong Kong Senior Shield are as follows:

4 goals

- (Brazil) Giovane Alves da Silva (Eastern Salon)

3 goals

- (Brazil) Beto (Eastern Salon)
- (Spain) Jonathan Carril (Royal Southern)
- (Bosnia and Herzegovina) Admir Raščić (Sun Pegasus)
- (Hong Kong) Jaimes McKee (Sun Pegasus)

2 goals

- (Hong Kong) Sham Kwok Keung (Citizen)
- (Brazil) João Emir Porto Pereira (South China)
- (Hong Kong) Lee Wai Lim (South China)
- (Brazil) Reinaldo Peres (Sunray Cave JC Sun Hei)
- (Hong Kong) Ju Yingzhi (Sun Pegasus)

1 goal

- (Hong Kong) Lam Hok Hei (Biu Chun Rangers)
- (South Korea) Lee Kil-Hoon (Biu Chun Rangers)
- (Brazil) Tales Schutz (Biu Chun Rangers)
- (Hong Kong) Sham Kwok Fai (Citizen)
- (Hong Kong) Wong Chin Hung (Eastern Salon)
- (Brazil) Fábio Lopes Alcântara (I-Sky Yuen Long)
- (Spain) Jordi Tarrés (Kitchee)
- (Australia) Andrew Barisic (South China)
- (Brazil) Dhiego de Souza Martins (South China)
- (Bosnia and Herzegovina) Sasa Kajkut (South China
- (Brazil) Ticão (South China)
- (Hong Kong) Chan Pak Hang (Sun Pegasus)
- (Hong Kong) Ling Cong (Tuen Mun)
- (Japan) Kenji Fukuda (Yokohama FC Hong Kong)

Own goal

- (Cameroon) Eugene Mbome (Sun Pegasus)

== Prizes ==
Top Scorer Award	Player of the Tournament
(Brazil) Giovane Silva (Eastern Salon)	(Australia) Andrew Barisic (South China)
