= Admir Raščić =

Bosnian footballer (born 1981)

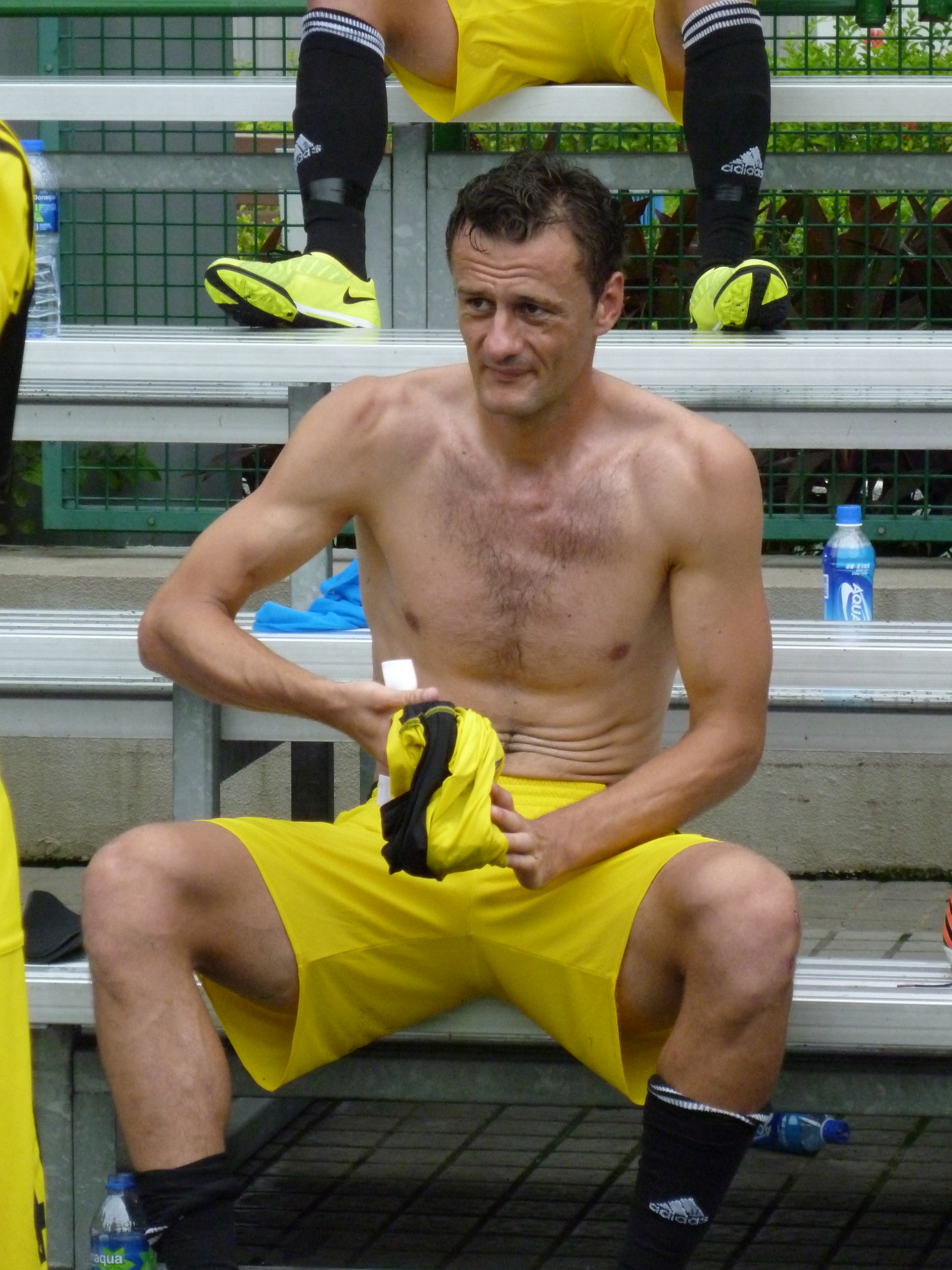
- Raščić with Sun Pegasus in 2013

Personal information
- Date of birth: 16 September 1981 (age 45)
- Place of birth: Foča, SFR Yugoslavia
- Height: 1.92 m (6 ft 4 in)
- Position: Striker

Youth career
- Goražde

Senior career*
Years	Team	Apps	(Gls)
2002–2006	Željezničar	51	(8)
2006–2007	Bela Krajina	29	(3)
2007–2009	Sarajevo	41	(16)
2009–2010	Sandefjord	34	(3)
2010–2011	Olimpik	26	(8)
2012	Novi Pazar	16	(5)
2013	Borac Banja Luka	15	(3)
2013–2015	Pegasus	34	(30)
2015–2016	Olimpik	13	(0)
2017	Goražde	13	(1)
2018–2019	Azot Vitkovići		

International career
2003	Bosnia and Herzegovina U21	1	(0)
2006–2008	Bosnia and Herzegovina	2	(0)

Managerial career
- 2019–2022: Azot Vitkovići
- 2023–2024: Bosnia and Herzegovina U17
- * Club domestic league appearances and goals

Admir Raščić (born 16 September 1981) is a Bosnian football manager and former player.

== Club career ==
Born in Foča, SR Bosnia and Herzegovina, Raščić began his career playing with FK Željezničar in the Bosnian Premier League, often appearing upfront alongside a young Edin Džeko.

In summer 2006 he moved abroad and joined NK Bela Krajina in the Slovenian First League. At the end of the season he returned to Bosnia, only this time joining Željezničar city rivals FK Sarajevo who had just been crowned Bosnian champions the season before. Admir Raščić had played 6 matches and scored on 3 occasions in Sarajevo's 2007–08 European campaign. He played with them for one and a half seasons, until he moved, in the winter break of 2008–09, to Norway's Tippeligaen side Sandefjord Fotball. He played for them in the 2009 and 2010 seasons. In the first season they finished 8th, but in 2010 Sandefjord ended up being relegated. During his two seasons in Norway, beside having played 34 league matches and scoring 3 goals, he also played with Sandefjord's second team for a total of 22 matches scoring 17 goals in the 2009 and 2010 Norwegian third tier.

In 2010 Admir Raščić was back in Bosnia, this time signing with Premier League side FK Olimpik. After making 26 league appearances and scoring 8 goals, in the winter break of 2010–11 he moved abroad again, this time to Serbia by signing with a newly promoted SuperLiga side FK Novi Pazar.

Upon the advice of his former teammate and longstanding mentor, Alen Bajkuša, Raščić joined Hong Kong First Division League club Sun Pegasus on 11 July 2013. On 30 August 2013, Raščić scored on his debut for Sun Pegasus against Happy Valley; the match finished 3–0 to Sun Pegasus. On 26 October 2013, Raščić netted the first hat-trick of the 2013–14 Hong Kong First Division League season in a 6–0 home victory against Tuen Mun SA. Unfortunately, the goals scored in both matches were later rescinded by the Hong Kong Football Association following its decision to disqualify Tuen Mun and Happy Valley from further participation in the league. Nevertheless, Raščić ended the season as the league's top goal scorer with 14 goals in 17 league appearances. He also won the HKFA Fans' Favourite Player of the Year Award and was selected into the HKFA 2013–14 Hong Kong First Division League Team of the Year. On 27 June 2015 Raščić returned to FK Olimpic to help them in their Europa League Campaign.

In February 2017 Raščić signed for FK Goražde. After leaving Goražde in June 2017, in August 2018, 1 year later, he signed for Second League of FBiH - Center club NK Azot Vitkovići, where he later became manager.

== International career ==
After being part of the Bosnian-Herzegovinian U-21 team in 2003, Admir Raščić made his debut for the main Bosnia and Herzegovina national football team in a February 2006 friendly match against Japan and earned a total of 2 caps, scoring no goals. His second and final international was a January 2008 friendly match against the same opposition.

== Personal life ==
At the age of 10, Raščić fled to Germany with his brother and grandmother as a result of the conflict in Bosnia. He is married to Mirela, who was born on exactly the same day as Raščić. The couple have two children, son Ajdin and daughter Hannan. His younger brother, 38-year-old ex-footballer Almir Raščić, was shot dead on 23 January 2023.

== Career statistics ==
=== Hong Kong ===
As of 14 May 2015. The following table only shows statistics in Hong Kong.

Club	Season	Division	League		Senior Shield		FA Cup		League Cup		Season play-offs		AFC Cup		Total	
Club	Season	Division	Apps	Goals	Apps	Goals	Apps	Goals	Apps	Goals	Apps	Goals	Apps	Goals	Apps	Goals
Sun Pegasus	2013–14^{1}	First Division	17	14	3	2	1	0	N/A	N/A	1	0	N/A	N/A	22	16
Sun Pegasus	2014–15	Premier League	16	12	1	0	0	0	2	1	0	0	N/A	N/A	19	13
Hong Kong Total			33	26	4	2	1	0	2	1	1	0	N/A	N/A	41	29

^{1} All league and cup appearance(s) and goal(s) scored against Happy Valley and Tuen Mun have been discounted due to Hong Kong Football Association's decision to disqualify both teams from further participation in the league.

== Honours ==
=== Player ===
Sun Pegasus

- 2013–14 Hong Kong First Division League Runners-up
- 2013–14 Hong Kong Senior Challenge Shield Runners-up

Individual

- Hong Kong First Division League Top Goal Scorer: 2013–14
- Hong Kong First Division League Fans' Favourite Player of the Year: 2013–14
- Hong Kong First Division League Team of the Year: 2013–14
- Hong Kong First Division League Monthly Most Valuable Player: September 2013, September 2014
