= Deng Jinghuang =

Hong Kong footballer

Deng Jinghuang 鄧景煌
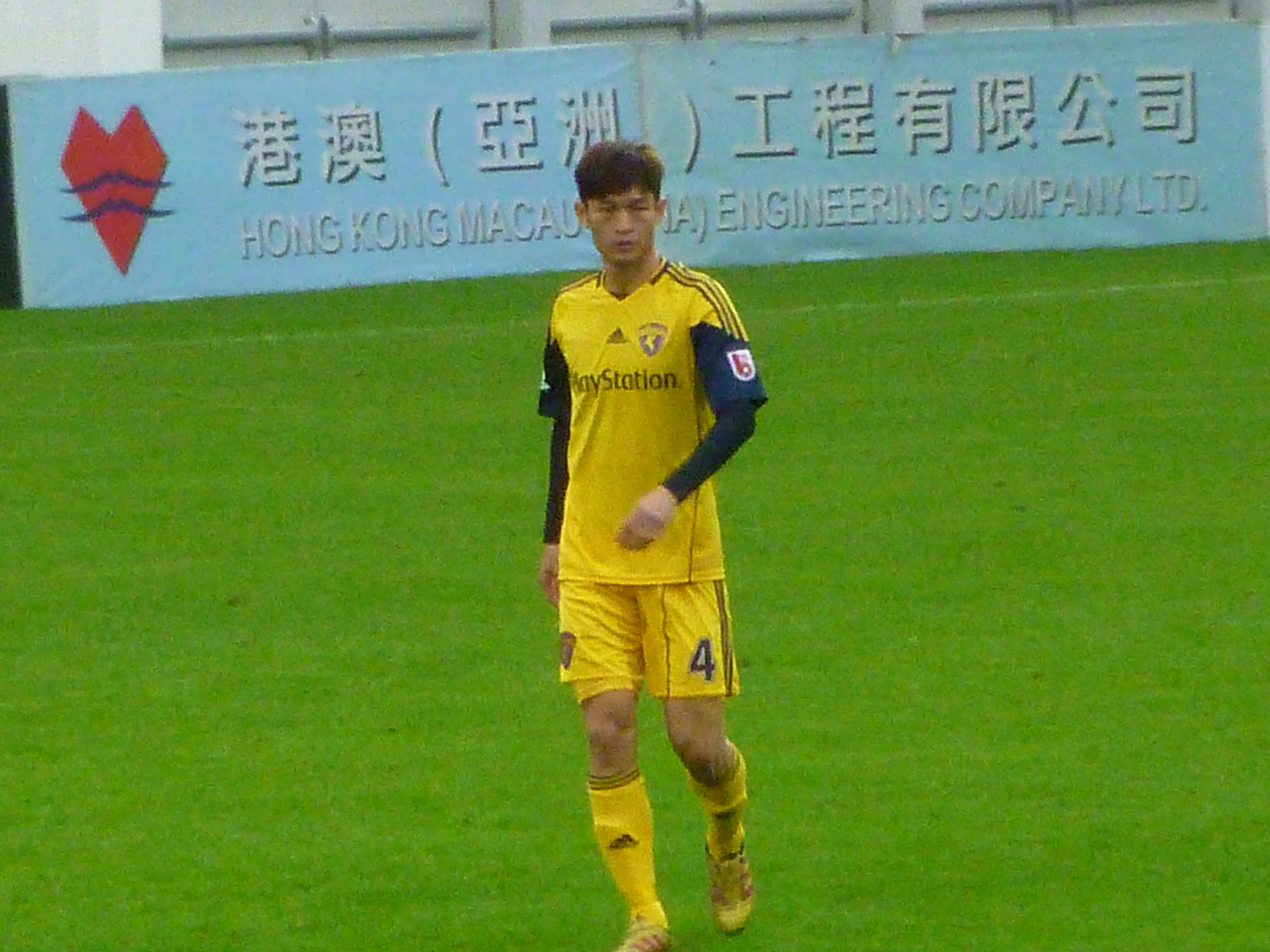

Personal information
- Full name: Deng Jinghuang
- Date of birth: 24 January 1985 (age 41)
- Place of birth: Guangzhou, Guangdong, China
- Height: 1.85 m (6 ft 1 in)
- Positions: Left back; centre back

Youth career
- 2003–2005: Guangzhou Xiangxue

Senior career*
Years	Team	Apps	(Gls)
2003–2005	→ Xiangxue Phar (loan)	19	(0)
2005–2006	Guangzhou Sunray Cave	0	(0)
2006–2008	South China	24	(0)
2008–2015	Pegasus	98	(5)

International career^{‡}
2009–2011	Hong Kong	4	(0)
- * Club domestic league appearances and goals as of 7 July 2008 ‡ National team caps and goals as of 9 February 2011

Deng Jinghuang

Chinese name
- Traditional Chinese: 鄧景煌
- Simplified Chinese: 邓景煌
- Hanyu Pinyin: Dèng Jǐnghuáng
Transcriptions
Standard Mandarin
- Hanyu Pinyin: Dèng Jǐnghuáng

Vietnamese name
- Vietnamese: Đặng Cảnh Hoàng

Deng Jinghuang (Chinese: 鄧景煌; born 24 January 1985) is a former professional footballer who played as a left back or a centre back. Born in China, he represented Hong Kong internationally.

== Club career ==
On 27 May 2015, Deng announced his retirement from professional football.

== International career ==
On 8 October 2009, Deng made his international debut for Hong Kong in the 2011 AFC Asian Cup qualifiers against Japan.

== Career statistics ==
=== Club ===
As of 14 May 2008

Club	Season	League		Senior Shield		League Cup		FA Cup		AFC Cup		Total	
Club	Season	Apps	Goals	Apps	Goals	Apps	Goals	Apps	Goals	Apps	Goals	Apps	Goals
South China	2005–06	2 (0)	0	1 (0)	0	0 (0)	0	2 (0)	1	NA	NA	5 (0)	1
South China	2006–07	16 (1)	0	2 (1)	0	3 (1)	0	4 (0)	0	NA	NA	25 (3)	0
South China	2007–08	1 (4)	0	0 (0)	0	1 (1)	0	0 (0)	0	3 (2)	0	5 (7)	0
All		19 (5)	0	3 (1)	0	4 (2)	0	6 (0)	1	3 (2)	0	35 (10)	1
Pegasus	2008–09	19 (0)	0	0 (0)	0	4 (0)	0	3 (1)	0	N/A	N/A	26 (1)	0
Pegasus	2009–10	0 (1)	0	0 (0)	0	0 (0)	0	0 (0)	0	N/A	N/A	0 (1)	0
All		19 (1)	0	0 (0)	0	4 (0)	0	3 (1)	0	N/A	N/A	26 (2)	0

=== International ===
As of 9 February 2011

#	Date	Venue	Opponent	Result	Scored	Competition
1	9 October 2009	Outsourcing Stadium, Shizuoka, Japan	Japan	0–6	0	2011 AFC Asian Cup qualification
2	6 January 2010	National Stadium, Madinat 'Isa, Bahrain	Bahrain	0–4	0	2011 AFC Asian Cup qualification
3	17 November 2010	Hong Kong Stadium, Hong Kong	Paraguay	0–7	0	Friendly
4	9 February 2011	Shah Alam Stadium, Kuala Lumpur	Malaysia	0–2	0	Friendly
