= Zhang Jun (footballer) =

Chinese-born Hong Kong footballer

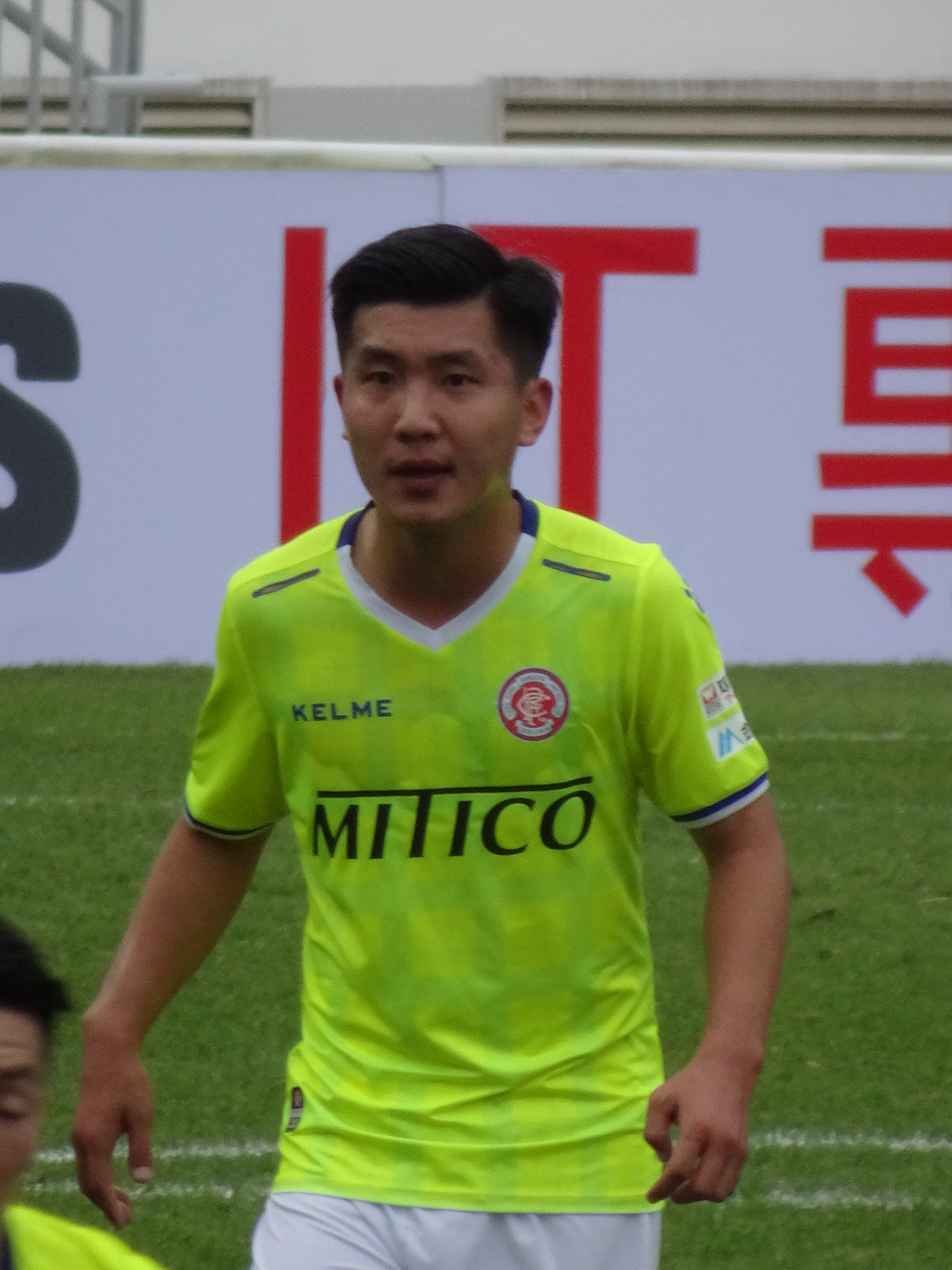

Personal information
- Full name: Zhang Jun
- Date of birth: 1 July 1992 (age 34)
- Place of birth: Wuhan, China
- Height: 1.75 m (5 ft 9 in)
- Position: Midfielder

Youth career
- 2001–2003: Changchun Yatai
- 2003–2008: Wuhan Optics Valley

Senior career*
Years	Team	Apps	(Gls)
2011	Nanchang Hengyuan	2	(0)
2012	→ Jiangxi Liansheng (loan)		
2014	Sun Hei	8	(0)
2014–2016	Wong Tai Sin	19	(1)
2016–2017	Biu Chun Glory Sky	8	(0)
2017	Mutual	3	(0)
2017–2019	Hong Kong Rangers	34	(2)
2019–2020	Hong Kong Rangers	34	(2)
2021–2024	Jiujiang Lizhiyuan		
2024–2025	Lanzhou Hailu		
2024–2025	Shenzhen Boss United		
2026–	Fu Moon	5	(0)
- * Club domestic league appearances and goals as of 16 May 2026

Zhang Jun (Chinese: 張君; pinyin: Zhāng Jūn; born 1 July 1992) is a former professional footballer who played as a midfielder.

== Career statistics ==
=== Club ===
As of 5 May 2019.

Club	Season	League			National Cup		League Cup		Other		Total	
Club	Season	Division	Apps	Goals	Apps	Goals	Apps	Goals	Apps	Goals	Apps	Goals
Sun Hei	2013–14	Hong Kong First Division	8	0	0	0	0	0	1 (Note: Appearances in the Hong Kong Senior Shield)	0	9	0
Wong Tai Sin	2014–15	Hong Kong Premier League	5	0	2 (Note: Appearances in the Hong Kong FA Cup)	1	5 (Note: Appearances in the HKFA League Cup)	0	1	0	13	1
Wong Tai Sin	2015–16	Hong Kong Premier League	14	1	0	0	3	0	0	0	17	1
Wong Tai Sin	Total		19	1	2	1	8	0	1	0	30	2
Biu Chun Glory Sky	2016–17	Hong Kong Premier League	8	0	0	0	0	0	2	0	10	0
Mutual	2017–18	Hong Kong First Division	3	0	0	0	0	0	0	0	3	0
Rangers	2017–18	Hong Kong Premier League	16	0	1	0	2 (Note: Appearances in the Sapling Cup)	0	2	0	21	0
Rangers	2018–19	Hong Kong First Division	18	2	3	1	0	0	0	0	21	3
Rangers	Total		34	2	4	1	2	0	2	0	42	3
Career total			72	3	6	2	10	0	6	0	94	5
