= Saša Kajkut =

Bosnian footballer (born 1984)

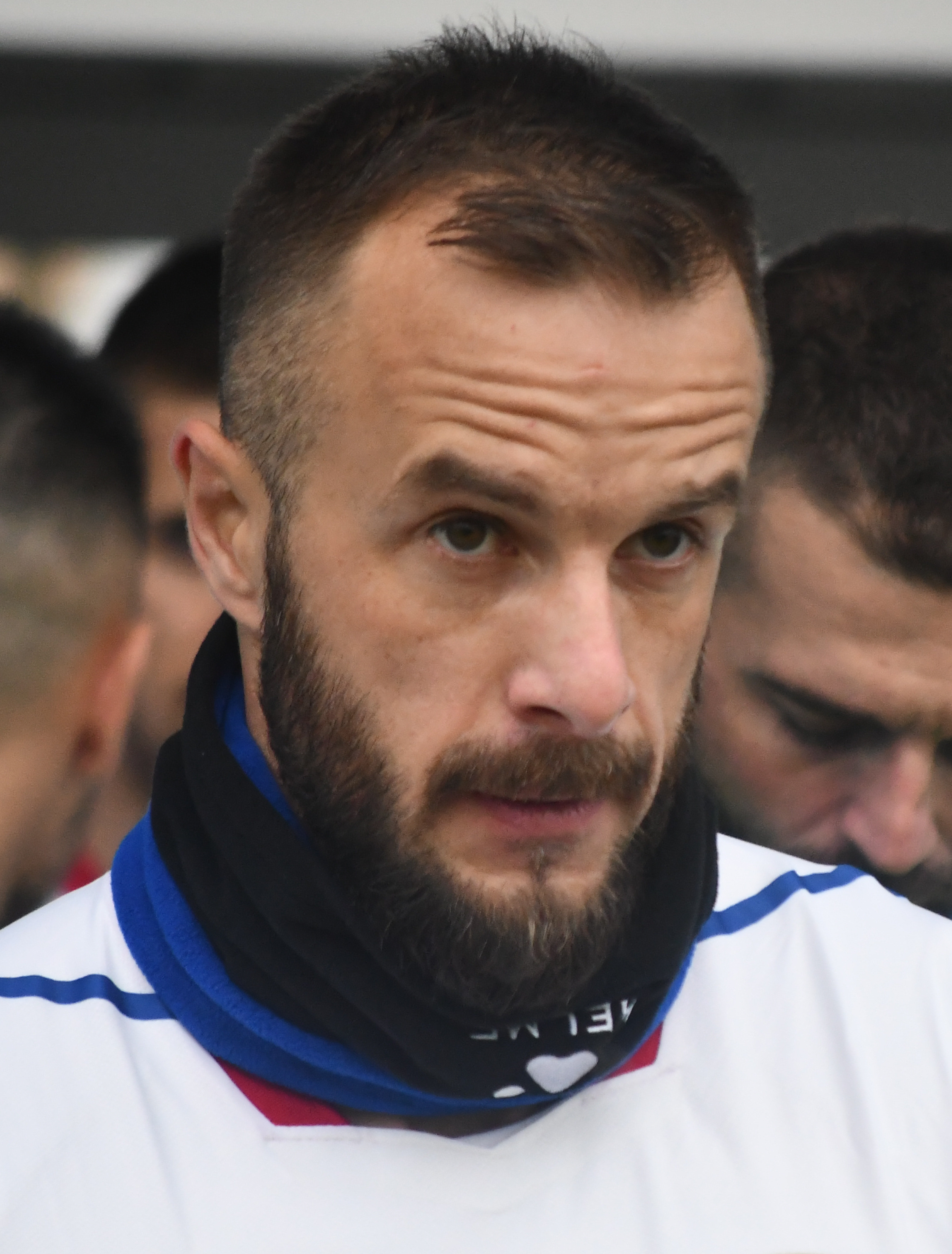
- Kajkut with Borac Banja Luka in 2020

Personal information
- Date of birth: 7 July 1984 (age 42)
- Place of birth: Banja Luka, SFR Yugoslavia
- Height: 1.88 m (6 ft 2 in)
- Position: Striker

Youth career
- 2002–2003: Omladinac Banja Luka

Senior career*
Years	Team	Apps	(Gls)
2003–2004	Borac Banja Luka	17	(3)
2005–2006	Karlovac	14	(5)
2006	Zadar	10	(8)
2006–2007	Pomorac 1921	25	(5)
2007–2008	Sheriff Tiraspol	23	(5)
2008–2010	Borac Banja Luka	48	(17)
2010–2011	Baku	9	(1)
2011–2012	Borac Banja Luka	24	(9)
2012–2013	Čelik Zenica	37	(18)
2013–2014	South China	4	(4)
2014–2015	Kerkyra	27	(5)
2015–2016	Veria	20	(0)
2016–2017	Krupa	8	(5)
2017	Zrinjski Mostar	10	(2)
2017–2018	Željezničar	23	(4)
2018–2021	Borac Banja Luka	55	(18)
Total		354	(104)

International career
2009	Bosnia and Herzegovina	1	(0)
- * Club domestic league appearances and goals

Saša Kajkut (Serbian Cyrillic: Саша Кајкут; born 7 July 1984) is a Bosnian former professional footballer who played as a striker.

== Club career ==
As a teenager, Kajkut played for hometown team Omladinac Banja Luka, after which he moved to Borac Banja Luka where he started his professional career. After that, Kajkut played for Croatian 2. HNL teams Zadar and Pomorac.

One of his remarkable memorable moment in his career is connected to the 2nd leg match for Sheriff Tiraspol against a team from Andorra in the 2007–08 UEFA Champions League first qualifying round. He first passed the ball to Wilfried Balima for scoring Sheriff's lead of 0–1 in the 68th minute (just 3 minutes after he entered the game), and then scored his first goal for the new team in the 77th minute. Kajkut created history in just 12 minutes, as he became the first ever player from Banja Luka scoring in an official Champions League match. With this extraordinary performance he became one of the favourite players for Sheriff fans though he only stayed there for one single season after that game.

After Sheriff, Kajkut went back to Borac, after which he played for Baku, again for Borac and Čelik Zenica. On 31 December 2013, he signed with South China permanently after a successful trial.

On 18 August 2015, PAE Kerkyra, for who Kajkut played at the time, was dismissed by Super League Greece for fake shareholds transfers. The club got relegated to Football League and Kajkut was eventually released by the club. He was approached directly Veria and agreed to join it on 19 August 2015. His yearly wages at Veria were €100,000. Kajkut was officially announced as Veria's player on 28 August 2015. He debuted on 12 September 2015, in a 3–0 home defeat against PAOK. He scored his first goal for Veria with a penalty kick in a Greek Cup match against Atromitos. After Varia, Kajkut once again went back to Bosnia and played for Krupa, Zrinjski Mostar and Željezničar.

In June 2018, for a fourth time in his career, Kajkut signed with Borac. In the 2018–19 First league of RS season, with Borac, he won the league title and got promoted back to the Bosnian Premier League. Kajkut finished his career at Borac in January 2021.

== International career ==
Kajkut made his first and only international appearance for Bosnia and Herzegovina on 1 June 2009, a 0–0 away friendly match draw against Uzbekistan, coming in as a 46th-minute substitute for Emir Hadžić.

== Career statistics ==
Appearances and goals by club, season and competition
Club	Division	League			Cup		Continental		Other		Total	
Club	Division	Division	Apps	Goals	Apps	Goals	Apps	Goals	Apps	Goals	Apps	Goals
Borac Banja Luka	2003–04	Bosnian Premier League	17	3	0	0	—		—		17	3
Karlovac	2005–06	2. HNL South	14	5	0	0	—		—		25	5
Zadar	2005–06	2. HNL	10	8	0	0	—		—		25	5
Pomorac 1921	2006–07	2. HNL	25	5	0	0	—		—		25	5
Sheriff Tiraspol	2007–08	Divizia Națională	23	5	0	0	2 (Note: Appearances in UEFA Champions League)	1	—		25	6
Borac Banja Luka	2008–09	Bosnian Premier League	21	11	0	0	—		—		21	11
Borac Banja Luka	2009–10	Bosnian Premier League	27	6	2	1	—		—		29	7
Borac Banja Luka	Total		48	17	2	1	—		—		50	18
Baku	2010–11	Azerbaijan Premier League	9	1	2	1	2 (Note: Appearances in UEFA Europa League)	1	—		13	3
Borac Banja Luka	2011–12	Bosnian Premier League	24	9	4	0	0	0	—		28	9
Čelik Zenica	2012–13	Bosnian Premier League	23	13	4	3	—		—		27	16
Čelik Zenica	2013–14	Bosnian Premier League	14	5	1	0	—		—		15	5
Čelik Zenica	Total		37	18	5	3	—		—		42	21
South China	2013–14	Hong Kong First Division League	4	4	2	1	7 (Note: Two appearances in AFC Champions League, five appearances and three goals in AFC Cup)	3	1 (Note: Appearances in Hong Kong Senior Shield)	1	14	9
Kerkyra	2014–15	Super League Greece	27	5	3	0	—		—		30	5
Veria	2015–16	Super League Greece	20	0	3	1	—		—		23	1
Krupa	2016–17	Bosnian Premier League	8	5	0	0	—		—		8	5
Zrinjski Mostar	2016–17	Bosnian Premier League	10	2	0	0	—		—		10	2
Zrinjski Mostar	2017–18	Bosnian Premier League	—		—		1	0	—		1	0
Zrinjski Mostar	Total		10	2	0	0	1	0	—		11	2
Željezničar	2017–18	Bosnian Premier League	23	4	5	0	—		—		28	4
Borac Banja Luka	2018–19	Bosnian First League	23	13	2	0	—		—		25	13
Borac Banja Luka	2019–20	Bosnian Premier League	18	5	1	0	—		—		19	5
Borac Banja Luka	2020–21	Bosnian Premier League	14	0	0	0	2	0	—		16	0
Borac Banja Luka	Total		55	18	3	0	2	0	—		60	18
Career total			354	104	29	7	14	5	1	1	398	117

== Honours ==
Sheriff Tiraspol

- Divizia Națională: 2007–08
- Moldovan Super Cup: 2007

Borac Banja Luka

- First League of RS: 2018–19

South China

- Hong Kong Senior Challenge Shield: 2013–14

Zrinjski Mostar

- Bosnian Premier League: 2016–17

Željezničar

- Bosnian Cup: 2017–18

Individual

- Bosnian Premier League Player of the Season: 2012–13
