= Yuan Yang (footballer) =

Chinese-born Hong Kong footballer

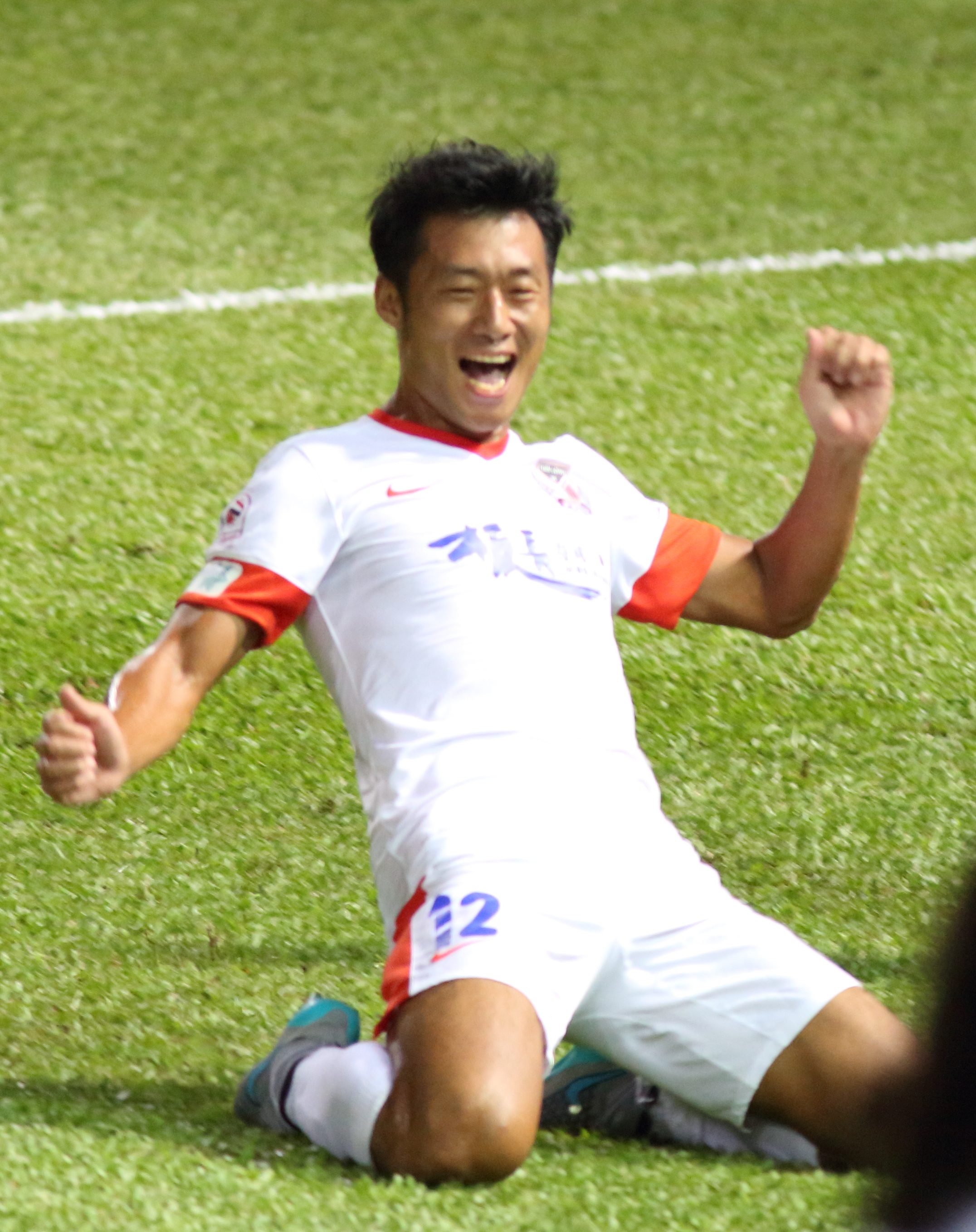

Personal information
- Date of birth: 12 December 1985 (age 40)
- Place of birth: Dalian, China
- Height: 1.83 m (6 ft 0 in)
- Position: Forward

Youth career
- 2002–2003: Dalian Shide

Senior career*
Years	Team	Apps	(Gls)
2003–2004	Dalian Shide		
2004–2009	Citizen	38	(16)
2009–2010	Tai Chung	16	(1)
2010–2013	Citizen	17	(2)
2013–2014	Sun Pegasus	9	(0)
2013	→Tuen Mun (loan)	6	(0)
2014–2016	Yuen Long	28	(4)
2016–2018	Wan Chai	4	(0)
2018	Hoi King	0	(0)
- * Club domestic league appearances and goals

Yuan Yang (Chinese: 元洋, born 12 December 1985) is a former professional football player who played as a forward.

== Club career ==
In 2004, Yuan signed for Hong Kong First Division club Citizen and scored 12 goals in his first season in Hong Kong.

In 2009, Yuan signed for First Division club Tai Chung.

In 2010, Yuan returned to Citizen.

In 2013, Yuan signed for Hong Kong First Division League club Sun Pegasus.

In 2014, Yuan signed for Hong Kong Premier League club Yuen Long.

== Honours ==
Citizen

- Hong Kong Senior Shield: 2010–11
- Hong Kong FA Cup: 2007–08
