= Ticão =

Brazilian footballer and manager

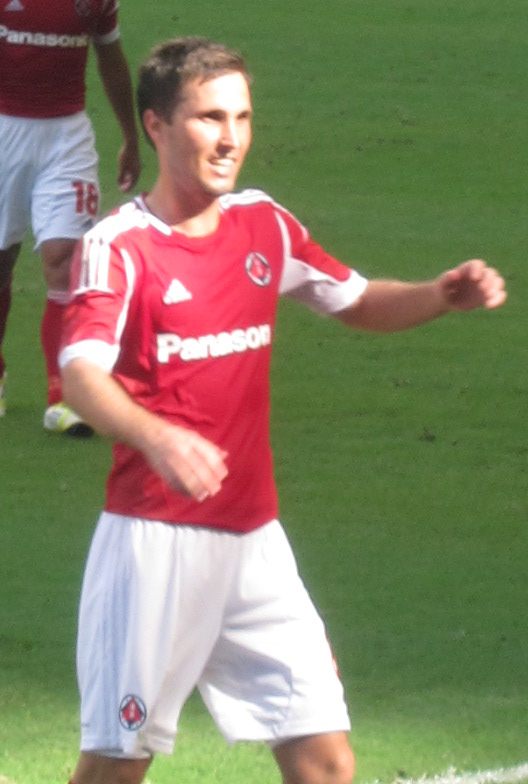
- Ticão playing for South China against Yokohama FC Hong Kong on 2 September 2012

Personal information
- Full name: Carlos Augusto Bertoldi
- Date of birth: February 7, 1985 (age 41)
- Place of birth: Curitiba, Brazil
- Height: 1.74 m (5 ft 9 in)
- Position: Defensive midfielder

Youth career
- 2000–2005: Athletico-PR

Senior career*
Years	Team	Apps	(Gls)
2005–2009	Athletico-PR	25	(0)
2006-2007	→ Sport (Loan)	10	(1)
2008	→ Náutico (Loan)	28	(0)
2009	→ Ituano FC (loan)	13	(1)
2009–2010	Fortaleza EC	22	(0)
2010	Novo Hamburgo		
2010–2011	Olympiacos Volos	4	(0)
2012	Pelotas	14	(0)
2012–2014	South China	30	(2)
2015	Luverdense	3	(0)
2016–2018	Yuen Long	34	(2)
2018–2020	Southern	24	(0)
- * Club domestic league appearances and goals as of 10 March 2020

Carlos Augusto Bertoldi (born February 7, 1985, in Curitiba), known simply as Ticão, is a Brazilian former professional footballer.

== Contract ==
- Náutico (Loan) 1 January 2008 to 31 December 2008
- Atlético-PR 1 January 2008 to 1 January 2010
