= Ng Yat Hoi =

Hong Kong footballer

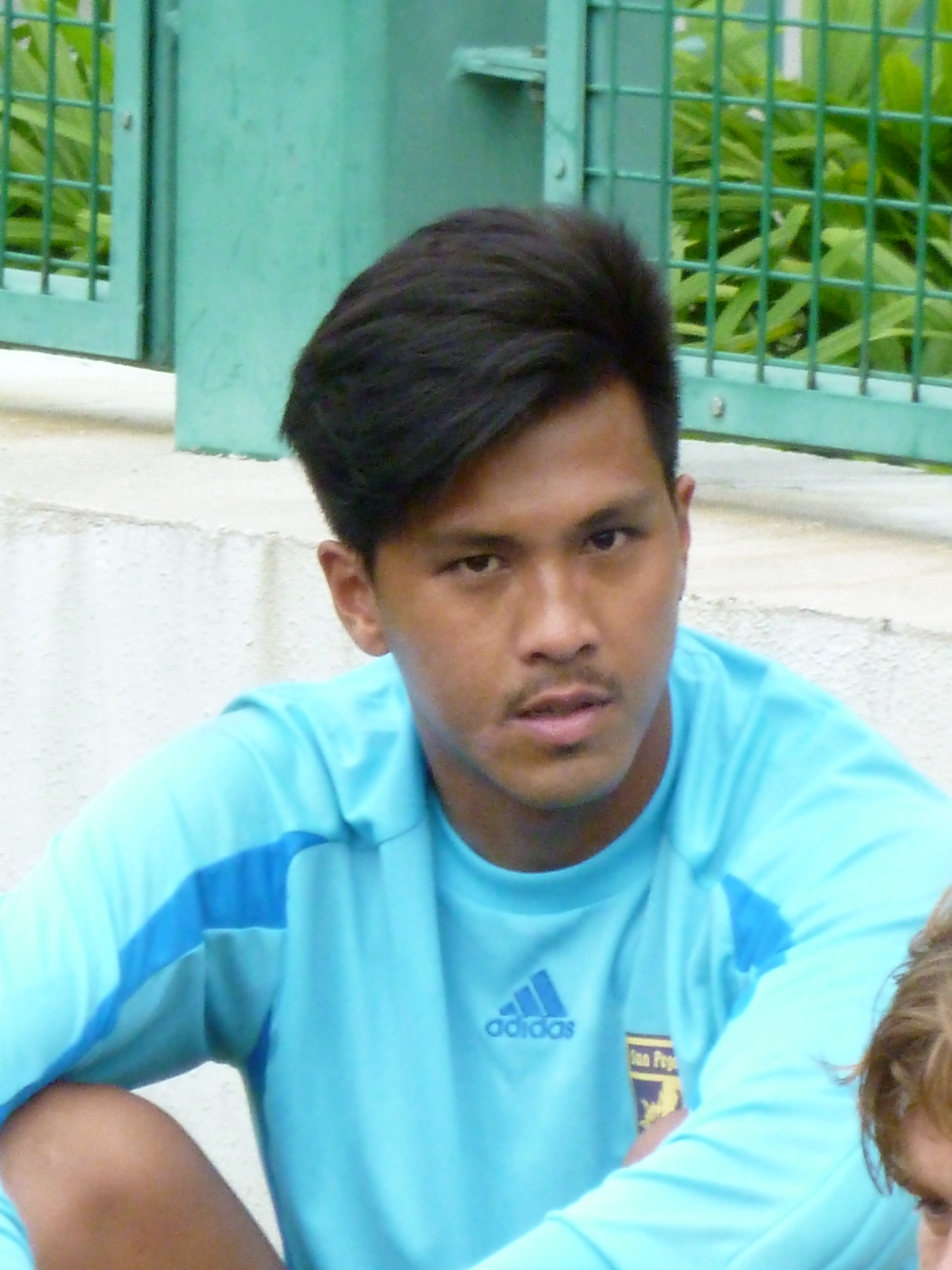

Personal information
- Full name: Ng Yat Hoi
- Date of birth: 6 November 1986 (age 39)
- Place of birth: Hong Kong
- Height: 1.77 m (5 ft 10 in)
- Position: Goalkeeper

Youth career
- 2002–2004: Hong Kong 08

Senior career*
Years	Team	Apps	(Gls)
2004–2005	Happy Valley	0	(0)
2005–2007	Hong Kong 08	27	(0)
2007–2010	Shatin	38	(0)
2010–2011	Tai Chung	13	(0)
2011–2012	Kam Fung	21	(0)
2012–2014	Pegasus	10	(0)
2016–2017	Metro Gallery	19	(0)
2022–2023	Lung Moon		

International career
2006–2009	Hong Kong U-23		
Medal record
Representing Hong Kong
East Asian Games
Gold medal – first place	2009 Hong Kong	Football
- * Club domestic league appearances and goals

Ng Yat Hoi (Chinese: 吳逸凱; born 6 November 1986) is a former Hong Kong professional footballer who played as a goalkeeper.

== Club career ==
As a child, Ng started playing football through the McDonald's youth training program. He chose to become a goalkeeper because he wanted to stand out.

In 2019, Ng said that he "felt lucky to be able to turn my hobby into a career". After retiring, Ng became a bodybuilder, fitness coach, and later started a drink shop.

== Honours ==
Hong Kong

- 2009 East Asian Games Football Event: Gold
