= Tse Man Wing =

Hong Kong footballer (born 1983)

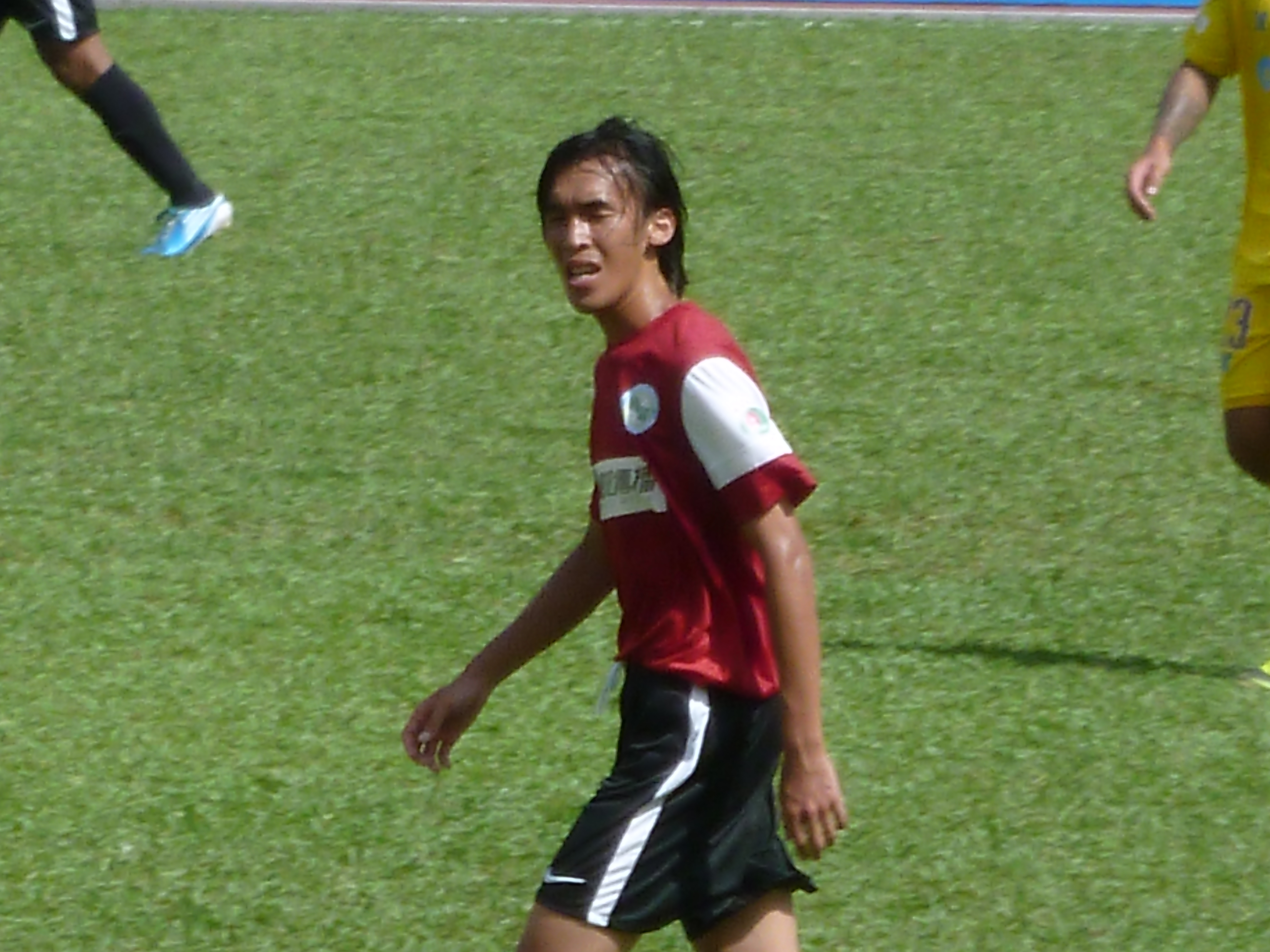

Personal information
- Full name: Tse Man Wing
- Date of birth: 5 January 1983 (age 43)
- Place of birth: Hong Kong
- Height: 1.83 m (6 ft 0 in)
- Positions: Left midfielder; left back

Team information
- Current team: Tai Po

Youth career
- 2000–2002: South China

Senior career*
Years	Team	Apps	(Gls)
2002–2006	South China		
2004–2005	→ Hong Kong Rangers (loan)		
2006–2011	Sun Hei	73	(3)
2012–2013	Southern	11	(0)
2013–2018	Eastern	35	(4)
2018–2019	Dreams FC	9	(0)
2019–2020	King Fung	9	(0)
2020–2021	Tai Po	1	(0)
2021–2023	3 Sing		
2024	Kui Tan		

International career
2006	Hong Kong	2	(0)
- * Club domestic league appearances and goals

Tse Man Wing (Chinese: 謝敏榮; Jyutping: ze^{6} man^{5} wing^{4}, born 5 January 1983 in Hong Kong) is a Hong Kong former professional footballer.

== Career statistics ==
=== Club career ===
As of 4 April 2008

Club	Season	League		League Cup		Senior Shield		FA Cup		AFC Cup		Total	
Club	Season	Apps	Goals	Apps	Goals	Apps	Goals	Apps	Goals	Apps	Goals	Apps	Goals
South China	2003–04	?	?	?	?	?	?	?	?	—	—	?	?
South China	Total									—	—		
Rangers (loan)	2004–05	?	1	?	0	?	0	?	0	—	—	?	1
Rangers (loan)	Total		1		0		0		0	—	—		1
South China	2005–06	10 (0)	1	0 (0)	0	3 (0)	0	0 (0)	0	—	—	13	1
South China	Total	10 (0)	1	0 (0)	0	3 (0)	0	0 (0)	0	—	—	13	1
Sun Hei	2006–07	9 (5)	1	1 (1)	0	0 (2)	0	1 (0)	0	4 (3)	0	26	1
Sun Hei	2007–08	3 (4)	0	2 (0)	0	0 (1)	0	—	—	0 (2)	0	12	0
Sun Hei	Total	21	1	4	0	3	0	1	0	9	0	38	1
Career Total										9	0		

=== International career ===
As of 6 December 2006

#	Date	Venue	Opponent	Result	Scored	Competition
1	15 February 2006	Hong Kong Stadium, Hong Kong	Singapore	1–1	0	Friendly
2	22 February 2006	Hong Kong Stadium, Hong Kong	Qatar	0–3	0	2007 AFC Asian Cup qualification
