= Aleksandar Ranđelović =

Serbian footballer

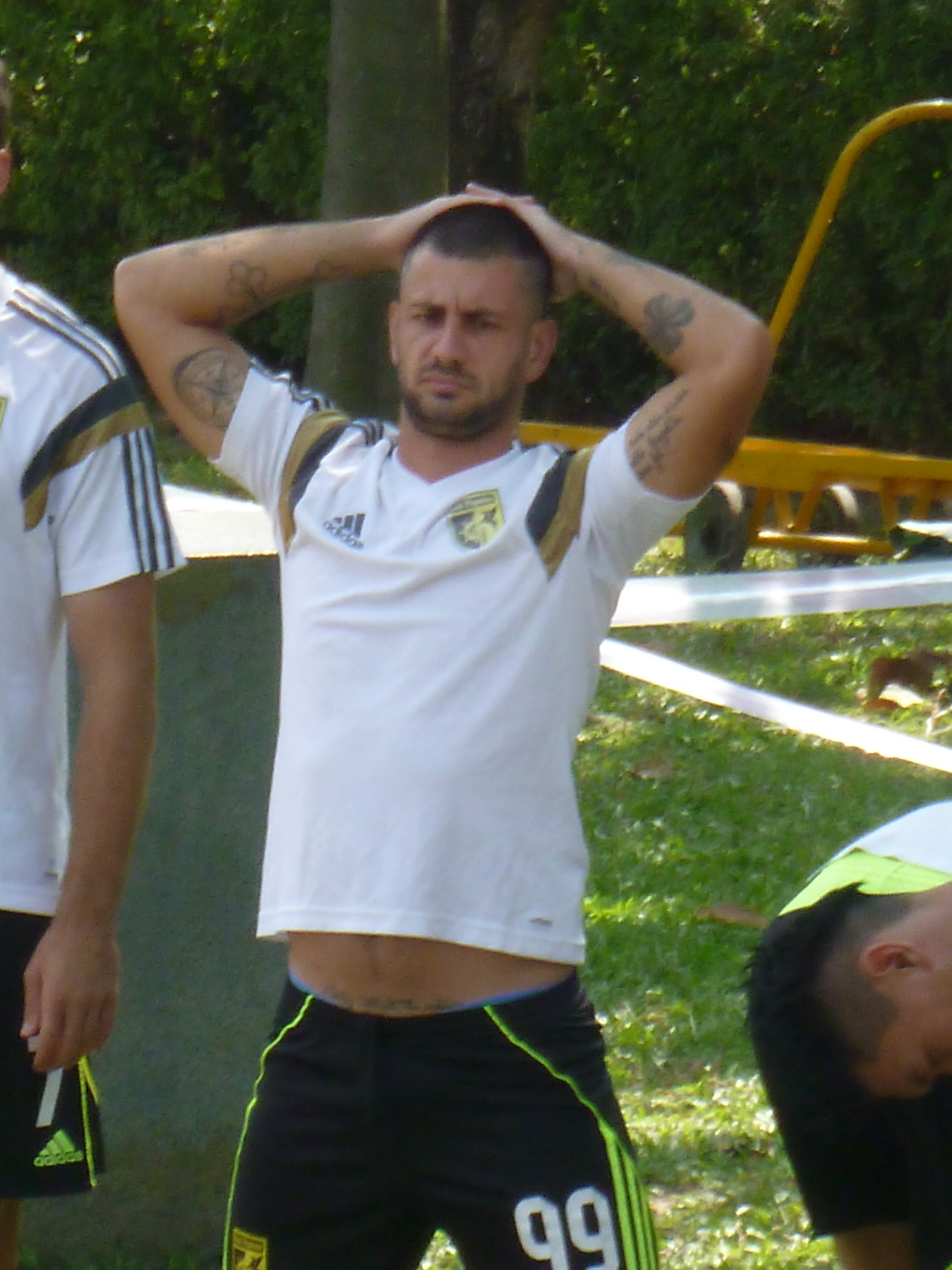

Personal information
- Full name: Aleksandar Ranđelović
- Date of birth: 9 December 1987 (age 38)
- Place of birth: Leskovac, SFR Yugoslavia
- Height: 1.78 m (5 ft 10 in)
- Position: Attacking midfielder

Youth career
- Partizan
- Vojvodina

Senior career*
Years	Team	Apps	(Gls)
2005–2008	Smederevo		
2008–2009	INON		
2009–2010	Sloga Petrovac		
2010	Radnički Svilajnac		
2011–2012	Orosháza	34	(17)
2012–2013	Békéscsaba	28	(15)
2013–2015	Sun Pegasus	31	(9)
2015	Lombard-Pápa	9	(1)
2016–2018	Yuen Long	43	(22)
2019	Ostbahn	9	(3)
- * Club domestic league appearances and goals

Aleksandar Ranđelović (Serbian Cyrillic: Александар Ранђеловић; born 9 December 1987) is a professional Serbian retired footballer who played as a attacking midfielder.

Born in Leskovac, he played for Vojvodina, Smederevo, INON Požarevac, Sloga Petrovac na Mlavi, Radnički Svilajnac, Orosháza, Békéscsaba, Lombard-Pápa TFC, Ayia Napa FC, Sun Pegasus and Pápa.

== Honours ==
Yuen Long

- Hong Kong Senior Shield: 2017–18
