= Eugene Mbome =

Cameroonian-born Hong Kong footballer

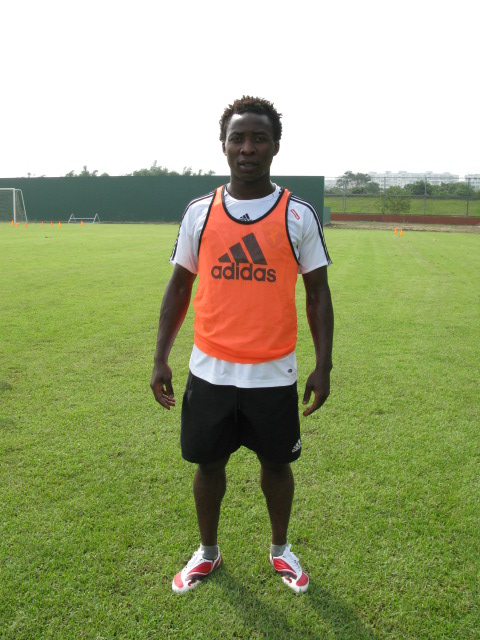

Personal information
- Full name: Eugene Petit Mbende Mbome
- Date of birth: 29 August 1986 (age 40)
- Place of birth: Yaoundé, Cameroon
- Height: 1.71 m (5 ft 7 in)
- Position: Defensive midfielder

Youth career
- 2003–2004: Cintra Yaoundé
- 2004–2005: Académica

Senior career*
Years	Team	Apps	(Gls)
2005–2006	Tarouca		
2006–2008	Pombal		
2008–2015	Pegasus	89	(10)
2011–2012	→ Sapling (loan)	8	(0)
2015–2016	Eastern	0	(0)
2015–2016	→ Metro Gallery (loan)	7	(0)
2016–2019	Pegasus	38	(1)
2019–2020	Tai Po	6	(0)
2021–2022	Metro Gallery	3	(0)
2022	Fu Moon		
2024–2025	Fu Moon	11	(0)
2026–	Wui Hong		

International career^{‡}
2003	Cameroon U17	10	(0)
- * Club domestic league appearances and goals as of 14 April 2022 ‡ National team caps and goals as of 20 June 2011

Eugene Petit Mbende Mbome (Chinese: 麥保美; born 29 August 1986) is a former professional footballer.

== Club career ==
=== Hong Kong Sapling ===
Mbome joined Sapling from Pegasus as a foreign player to help the team.

On 22 November 2011, Mbome fainted before training and was taken to Princess Margaret Hospital. He remained in hospital upon waking up for continued observation.

=== Pegasus ===
On 5 January 2012, it was announced that Mbome had returned to Pegasus, as coach Chan Hiu Ming wanted to improve the team's defensive ability in midfield.

=== Eastern & Metro Gallery ===
On 12 June 2015, he joined Eastern. However, he was loaned to Metro Gallery for the rest of the season.

=== Return to Pegasus ===
Mbome returned to Pegasus at the start of the 2016-17 season.

=== Tai Po ===
On 29 July 2019, it was announced that Mbome had joined Tai Po.

== International career ==
Mbome played for the Cameroon national under-17 football team and played as vice-captain of Cameroon U17 for the 2003 African Under-17 Championship and the 2003 FIFA U-17 World Championship.
