= Chan Pak Hang =

Hong Kong footballer

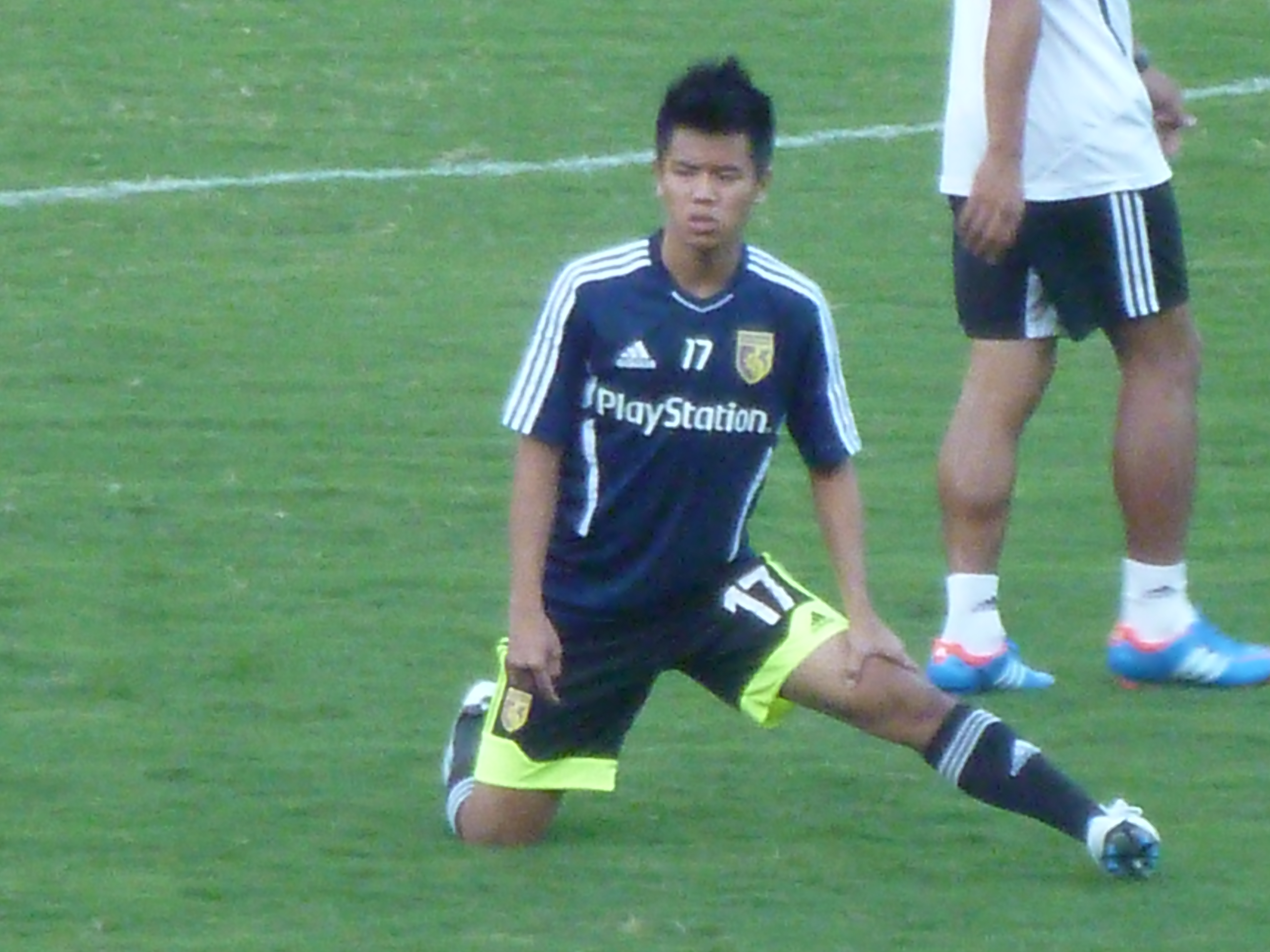

Personal information
- Full name: Chan Pak Hang
- Date of birth: 21 November 1992 (age 33)
- Place of birth: Hong Kong
- Height: 1.73 m (5 ft 8 in)
- Positions: Left midfielder; left back

Youth career
- 2000–2011: Sun Hei
- 2011: South China

Senior career*
Years	Team	Apps	(Gls)
2011–2012	South China	2	(0)
2012–2016	Pegasus	39	(2)
2018–2019	Yuen Long	16	(0)
2019–2021	Pegasus	16	(1)
2021–2025	Sai Kung	55	(7)

International career
2012	Hong Kong U-23	6	(0)
- * Club domestic league appearances and goals

Chan Pak Hang (Chinese: 陳柏衡; Cantonese Yale: Chàn Paakhàng ; born 21 November 1992) is a former Hong Kong professional footballer who played as a left midfielder or a left back.

== Club career ==
=== South China ===
In July 2011, Chan was promoted from the reserves to the first team. He also wore the number 26 during the 2011–12 season .

Chan played his debut game for South China on 22 October 2011, playing against Sapling at Mong Kok Stadium.

=== Pegasus ===
Chan joined Pegasus on a season-long loan.

On 6 October 2016, Chan was one of six current and former Pegasus players to be taken in for questioning by the ICAC on allegations of match fixing. He was formally charged on 28 June 2017 for conspiracy to defraud and offering an advantage to an agent. Chan allegedly offered HKD $20,000 bribes to two separate players to fix a reserve league match in March 2016.

On 19 April 2018, Chan was found not guilty of conspiracy to defraud after the judge ruled that he could not convict him beyond a reasonable doubt.

=== Yuen Long ===
On 15 July 2018, Chan was unveiled as a Yuen Long player, resuming his career after two years away from the game.

=== Pegasus ===
On 8 July 2019, Chan returned to Pegasus, signing a one-year contract.

== Career statistics ==
=== Club ===
As of 11 May 2013

Club	Season	League		Senior Shield		League Cup		FA Cup		AFC Cup		Total	
Club	Season	Apps	Goals	Apps	Goals	Apps	Goals	Apps	Goals	Apps	Goals	Apps	Goals
South China	2011–12	2	0	0	0	0	0	0	0	N/A	N/A	2	0
South China Total		2	0	0	0	0	0	0	0	0	0	2	0
Sun Pegasus	2012–13	8	0	1	0	—	—	4	1	N/A	N/A	13	1
Sun Pegasus Total		8	0	1	0	0	0	4	1	0	0	13	1
Career Total		10	0	1	0	0	0	4	1	0	0	15	1

=== International ===
==== Hong Kong U-23 ====
As of 3 July 2012

#	Date	Venue	Opponent	Result	Scored	Captain	Competition
1	16 June 2012	Macau Stadium, Macau	Macau	3–1	0		2012 Hong Kong–Macau Interport
2	23 June 2012	Chao Anouvong Stadium, Vientiane, Laos	Cambodia	2–3	0		2013 AFC U-22 Championship qualification
3	25 June 2012	New Laos National Stadium, Vientiane, Laos	China	1–5	0		2013 AFC U-22 Championship qualification
4	28 June 2012	Chao Anouvong Stadium, Vientiane, Laos	North Korea	0–1	0		2013 AFC U-22 Championship qualification
5	30 June 2012	New Laos National Stadium, Vientiane, Laos	Laos	0–2	0		2013 AFC U-22 Championship qualification
6	3 July 2012	Chao Anouvong Stadium, Vientiane, Laos	Thailand	0–4	0		2013 AFC U-22 Championship qualification
