= Josip Škorić =

Croatian footballer

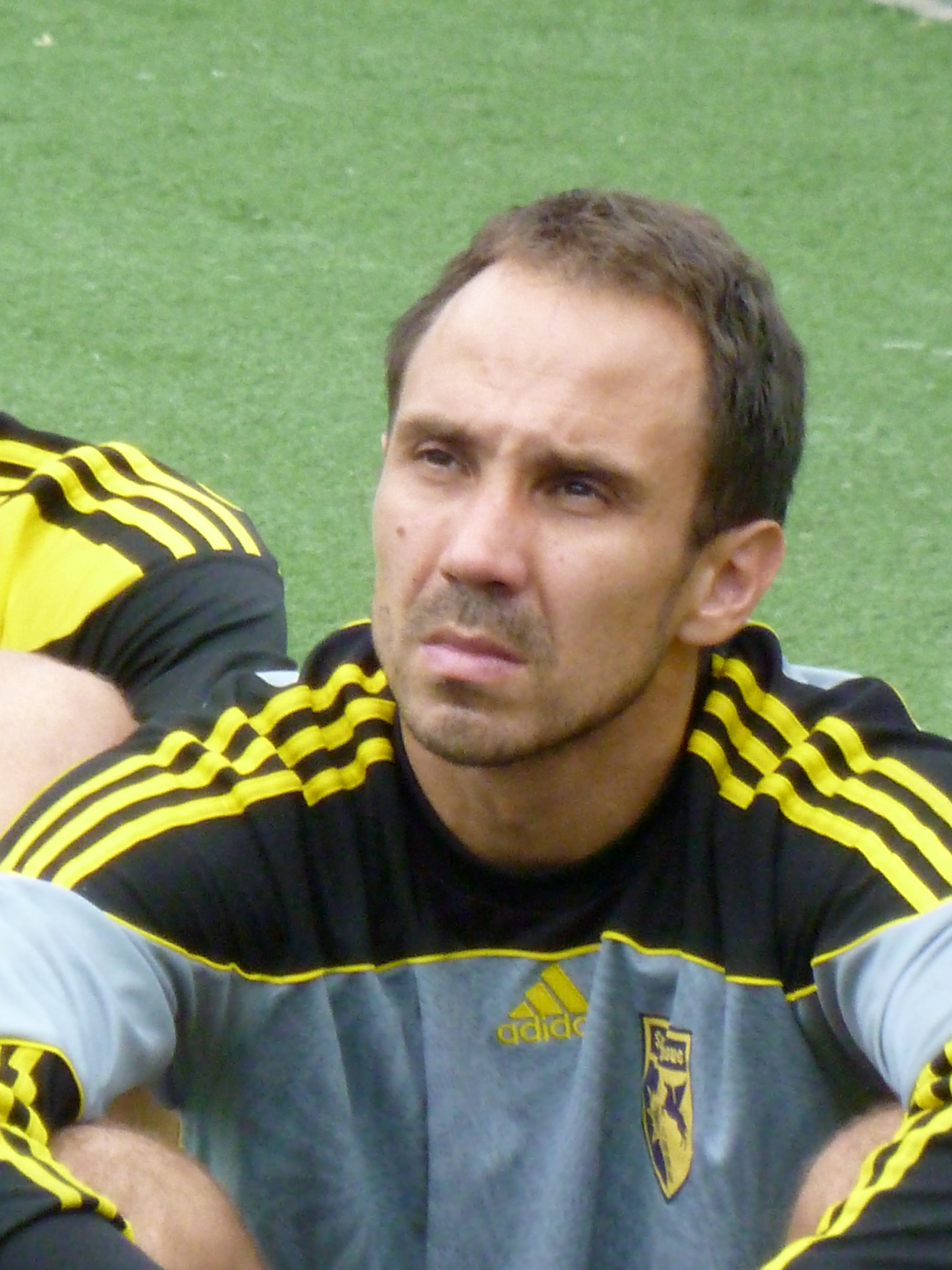

Personal information
- Date of birth: 13 February 1981 (age 45)
- Place of birth: Split, Croatia
- Height: 1.86 m (6 ft 1 in)
- Position: Goalkeeper

Youth career
- 1997–2000: Hajduk Split

Senior career*
Years	Team	Apps	(Gls)
2000–2002	Solin		
2002–2004	Marsonia	9	(0)
2004–2010	NK Zagreb	57	(0)
2010–2011	Istra 1961	26	(0)
2012	Omiš	13	(0)
2012	Šibenik	12	(0)
2013–2014	Sun Pegasus	14	(0)
2015–2019	Omiš		

International career^{‡}
1999–2000	Croatia U18	2	(0)
- * Club domestic league appearances and goals as of 8 September 2012 ‡ National team caps and goals as of 23 March 2000

Josip Škorić (born 13 February 1981 in Split) is a retired Croatian football goalkeeper who is currently a goalkeeper trainer at NK Slaven Belupo.

== Career ==
In 2010, Škorić joined Istra 1961 from NK Zagreb after having his contract terminated by mutual consent. Before that, he had short spells in Solin and Marsonia. After leaving Istra 1961 in May 2011, Škorić joined third-tier club Omiš in February 2012. In September 2012, Škorić joined Šibenik.
