= Landon Ling =

Canadian soccer player (born 1987)

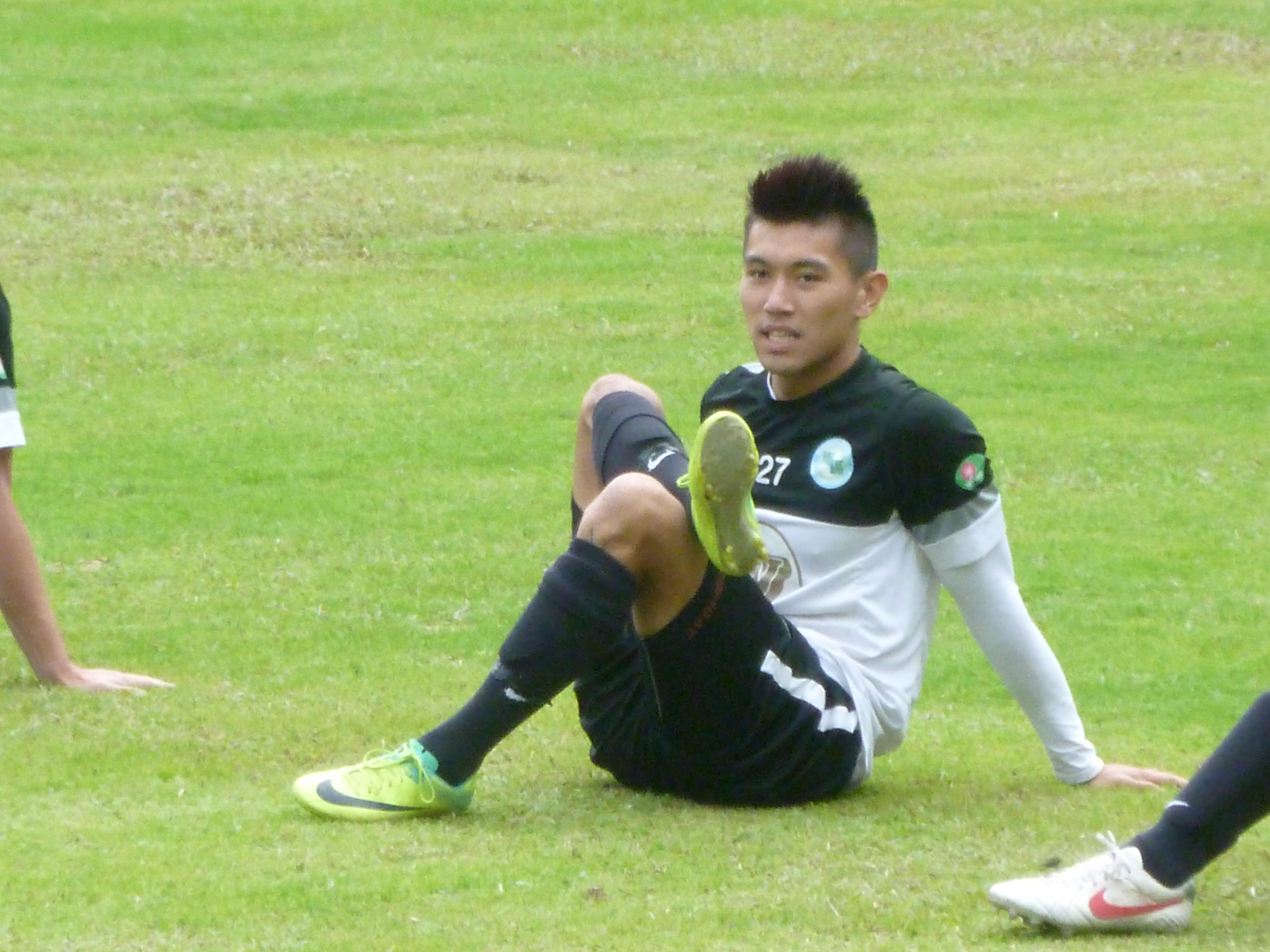
- Ling in 2012

Personal information
- Full name: Landon Lloyd Ling
- Date of birth: 8 October 1987 (age 39)
- Place of birth: Vancouver, British Columbia, Canada
- Height: 6 ft 0 in (1.83 m)
- Positions: Left-back; left winger

Youth career
- 2003–2005: Vancouver Whitecaps
- 2005–2006: Blackburn Rovers
- 2006–2007: Jablonec 97

Senior career*
| Years | Team | Apps | (Gls) |
| 2007–2008 | Jablonec 97 | 7 | (0) |
| 2008–2009 | Kitchee | 18 | (1) |
| 2011–2013 | Kitchee | 3 | (0) |
| 2012–2013 | → Southern (loan) | 12 | (3) |
| 2013–2015 | Pegasus | 20 | (2) |
| 2015–2016 | Hong Kong Rangers | 3 | (0) |

International career^{‡}
| 2007 | Canada U-20 | 1 | (0) |
- * Club domestic league appearances and goals as of 13 June 2013 ‡ National team caps and goals as of 17 July 2008

Landon Lloyd Ling (Chinese: 林家亮; Cantonese Yale: Lam4 Ga1 Leung4; born 8 October 1987) is a Canadian former professional soccer player who played as a left-back or a left winger. He also works in Canada as a singer, songwriter and music producer under the name of "Landon L".

== Club career ==
Ling began his football career at Vancouver with Whitecaps FC Prospects. In 2002, he attended the Blackburn Rovers youth academy. He later moved to the Czech Republic in 2006 where he signed a contract with Jablonec 97. He played two years in the Czech Republic before joining Hong Kong's Kitchee in the summer of 2008.

Ling was a regular first-team player at Kitchee in the 2008–09 season. Head coach Julio César Moreno asserted that he was a vital player.

He was selected for the Hong Kong League XI in 2009 where he participated in the Lunar New Year Cup with Sparta Prague, Suwon Samsung Bluewings, South China, and Pegasus.

Ling was injured during 2009 pre-season training with Kitchee. He returned to Canada to work in music production.

In November 2011, he returned to Kitchee after a long recovery.

In the 2012–13 season, Ling was loaned to Southern where he contributed to the club's success. He scored a goal on his first appearance for the club, although he broke his right arm during a fall.

In the 2013–14 season, he signed with Pegasus as a first-team player, starting as a left back. He continued with Pegasus in the 2014–15 season and was the runner-up at the end of the season.

== International career ==
Ling was a member of the Canada U-20 men's national soccer team for the friendly match against Czech Republic national under-20 football team in Prague on 6 October 2007. He played all 90 minutes in the 2–1 victory for Canada.

== Entertainment career ==
In February 2010, he released It Started With Everything, his first mixtape album.

In April 2012, he released, Another Chapter, his second mixtape album.

In July 2014, he founded independent record label LLM. He signed a contract with Sun Entertainment Culture Limited, where he was managed by Paco Wong, known as "Gold Manager".

He released ADHD, his EP album on iTunes in December 2015, under the artist name of Landon L. In July 2014, he released a music video for the song titled "For You" featuring Ukrainian model Iryna Z and directed by ShotByFong.

In October 2014, he released "So Gone" with a music video featuring Jennifer Nguyen and directed by ShotByFong.

In November 2014, he released "Sophisticated" with a music video.

In April 2015, he released "Colda" with a music video featuring Jeri Lee, directed by ShotByFong.

In May 2016, he released "Music & Love" with a music video, featuring Jennifer Nguyen, directed by ShotByFong.

In June 2019, he released a single titled "Sunsets" and released Concussion, his first studio album, on Spotify.

== Personal life ==
In 2014 Ling started dating actress and model Wylie Chiu. They have a dog named Bacon.

In 2017 Ling was involved in a near fatal motor vehicle accident where he was his hit by another vehicle from oncoming traffic. He sustained a traumatic brain injury (TBI) and lost consciousness due to a severe concussion.

In 2018, he was involved in another motor vehicle accident where he sustained another TBI and superficial lacerations when another vehicle hit him at an intersection. Doctors later diagnosed him with PCS and ADHD.
