= 2012–13 Sun Pegasus FC season =

Sun Pegasus FC
2012–13 season
- President: Cheng Ting Kong
- Head Coach: Chan Chi Hong
- Home ground: Yuen Long Stadium
- First Division: 5th
- Senior Shield: Quarter-finals
- FA Cup: Runner-up
- Top goalscorer: League: McKee (16); All: McKee (18)
- Highest home attendance: 1,616 (22 December 2012 vs South China, First Division)
- Lowest home attendance: 406 (24 November 2012 vs Southern, Senior Shield)
- Average home league attendance: 670 (in all competitions)
| Home colours | Away colours |

The 2012–13 season is Sun Pegasus FC's 5th season in football in Hong Kong First Division League. Sun Pegusus will seek to win the league, which they failed last year as Kitchee won. The club will also be competing in the Senior Challenge Shield and the FA Cup.

== Key Events ==
- 19 July 2012: Sun Pegasus FC announced first team squad through their official website.
- 29 September 2012: Two Brazilian, defender Costa De Miranda Natanael and midfielder Thiago Constância, joined the club for an undisclosed fee and for free respectively. On the other hand, Chinese midfielder Xiao Yifeng was released.
- 25 December 2012: Hong Kong defender Ng Wai Chiu leaves the club and joins China League One club Tianjin Songjiang.
- 26 December 2012: Chinese-Hongkonger midfielder Bai He joins the club on loan from South China until the end of the season.
- 31 December 2012: Four Brazilian players, including Sandro, Jone da Silva Pinto, Thiago Constância and Costa De Miranda Natanael, are released by the club.
- 11 January 2013: Serbian and Brazilian defender Igor Miović and Paulo Cesar Fonseca Nunes joined the club from Serbian SuperLiga club FK Smederevo and Brazilian club Central SC for an undisclosed fee respectively.
- 11 January 2013: Bosnian forward Vladimir Karalić joins the club from Premier League of Bosnia and Herzegovina club FK Rudar Prijedor for an undisclosed fee.
- 23 January 2013: South Korean forward Kim Dong-Ryeol joins the club as a free transfer after a successful trial in Malaysia.
- 23 January 2013: Brazilian defender Juninho leaves the club and joins Biu Chun Rangers after spending a half season at the club.
- 24 January 2013: South Korean midfielder Lee Kwan-yoo joins the club as a free transfer.
- 29 January 2013: Hong Kong goalkeeper Ho Kwok Cheun rejoins the club from Sunray Cave JC Sun Hei for an undisclosed fee.
- 31 January 2013: Hong Kong goalkeeper Poon Kwong Tak joins the club as a free transfer. He will also be the assistant coach of the team.
- 4 May 2013: The club secured a place for the next season's First Division as they defeated Biu Chun Rangers 8–2 in the final match.
- 11 May 2013: The club failed to gain a place for the 2013 Hong Kong AFC Cup play-offs as they lost 0–1 to Kitchee in the FA Cup final.

== Players ==
=== First team ===
As of 6 March 2013.

Note: Flags indicate national team as defined under FIFA eligibility rules; some limited exceptions apply. Players may hold more than one non-FIFA nationality.

| No. | Pos. | Nation | Player |
|---|---|---|---|
| 1 | GK | HKG | Ng Yat Hoi |
| 2 | DF | HKG | Lee Wai Lun (captain) |
| 3 | DF | HKG | Fung Kai Hong |
| 4 | DF | HKG | Deng Jinghuang |
| 5 | DF | BRA | Paulo Cesar Fonseca Nunes |
| 6 | DF | BRA | Juninho |
| 7 | MF | HKG | Chuck Yiu Kwok |
| 8 | MF | HKG | Xu Deshuai |
| 9 | FW | KOR | Kim Dong-Ryeol |
| 10 | DF | CMR | Eugene Mbome |
| 11 | FW | BIH | Vladimir Karalić |
| 13 | DF | HKG | Li Ngai Hoi |
| 15 | DF | HKG | Cheung Chun Hei |
| 16 | GK | HKG | Ho Kwok Chuen |

| No. | Pos. | Nation | Player |
|---|---|---|---|
| 17 | MF | HKG | Chan Pak Hang |
| 18 | MF | HKG | Bai He (on loan from South China) |
| 19 | GK | CHN | Li Jian (on loan from Kitchee) |
| 20 | DF | SRB | Igor Miović |
| 21 | DF | HKG | Tong Kin Man |
| 22 | GK | HKG | Yuen Ho Chun |
| 23 | MF | HKG | Jaimes Mckee (vice-captain) |
| 24 | MF | HKG | Ju Yingzhi |
| 27 | MF | KOR | Lee Kwan-Yoo |
| 28 | MF | HKG | Lo Chun Kit |
| 30 | GK | CRO | Josip Škorić |
| 32 | GK | HKG | Poon Kwong Tak |
| 33 | DF | HKG | So Wai Chuen |

=== Transfers ===
==== In ====
| Squad # | Position | Player | Transferred from | Fee | Date | Team | Source |
|---|---|---|---|---|---|---|---|
| 1 | GK | (Hong Kong) Ng Yat Hoi | Kam Fung | Undisclosed | 19 July 2012 | First Team | |
| 3 | DF | (Hong Kong) Fung Kai Hong | Citizen | | 19 July 2012 | First Team | |
| 5 | DF | (Hong Kong) Ng Wai Chiu | South China | | 19 July 2012 | First Team | |
| 6 | DF | (Brazil) Juninho | | | 19 July 2012 | First Team | |
| 7 | FW | (Hong Kong) Chuck Yiu Kwok | Biu Chun Rangers | | 19 July 2012 | First Team | |
| 8 | MF | (Hong Kong) Xu Deshuai | South China | | 19 July 2012 | First Team | |
| 9 | FW | (Hong Kong) Sandro | Biu Chun Rangers | | 19 July 2012 | First Team | |
| 13 | DF | (Hong Kong) Li Ngai Hoi | Kitchee | | 19 July 2012 | First Team | |
| 15 | DF | (Hong Kong) Cheung Chun Hei | South China | Undisclosed | 19 July 2012 | First Team | |
| 16 | MF | (China) Xiao Yifeng | Guangong Sunray Cave | | 19 July 2012 | First Team | |
| 17 | MF | (Hong Kong) Chan Pak Hang | South China | Undisclosed | 19 July 2012 | First Team | |
| 18 | MF | (Hong Kong) Ngan Lok Fung | Kitchee | Loan | 6 July 2012 | First Team | |
| 19 | GK | (China) Li Jian | Kitchee | | 19 July 2012 | First Team | |
| 28 | MF | (Hong Kong) Lo Chun Kit | Wanchai | | 19 July 2012 | First Team | |
| 20 | DF | (Brazil) Costa De Miranda Natanael | FCM Turda | | 29 September 2012 | First Team | |
| 26 | MF | (Brazil) Thiago Constância | Free agent | Free transfer | 29 September 2012 | First Team | |
| 18 | MF | (Hong Kong) Bai He | South China | On loan until end of season | 26 December 2012 | First Team | |
| 20 | DF | (Serbia) Igor Miović | (Serbia) FK Smederevo | | 13 January 2013 | First Team | |
| 5 | DF | (Brazil) Paulo Cesar Fonseca Nunes | (Brazil) Central SC | | 13 January 2013 | First Team | |
| 11 | FW | (Bosnia and Herzegovina) Vladimir Karalić | (Bosnia and Herzegovina) Rudar Prijedor | | 13 January 2013 | First Team | |
| 9 | FW | (South Korea) Kim Dong-Ryeol | | | 23 January 2013 | First Team | |
| 27 | MF | (South Korea) Lee Kwan-Yoo | | | 24 January 2013 | First Team | |
| 16 | GK | (Hong Kong) Ho Kwok Cheun | Sunray Cave JC Sun Hei | | 30 January 2013 | First Team | |
| 32 | GK | (Hong Kong) Poon Kwong Tak | Kwun Tong | Free transfer | 30 January 2013 | First Team | |
| 30 | GK | (Croatia) Josip Škorić | | | 6 March 2013 | Sun Pegasus | |

==== Out ====
| Squad # | Position | Player | Transferred to | Fee | Date | Source |
|---|---|---|---|---|---|---|
| 3 | DF | (Brazil) Lucas De Lima Tagliapietra | End of contract | | | |
| 5 | DF | (Australia) Karl Dodd | End of contract | | | |
| 6 | MF | (Hong Kong) Luk Koon Pong | End of contract | | | |
| 8 | MF | (Brazil) Itaparica | South China | | 20 June 2012 | |
| 9 | MF | (Hong Kong) Lau Ka Shing | End of contract | | | |
| 13 | MF | (Hong Kong) Cheung Kin Fung | Sunray Cave JC Sun Hei | Free transfer | 16 July 2012 | |
| 14 | MF | (Hong Kong) Chan Ming Kong | Southern | Free transfer | 17 July 2012 | |
| 16 | DF | (Hong Kong) Lau Nim Yat | Rangers | Free transfer | 8 July 2012 | |
| 16 | MF | (China) Xiao Yifeng | Unattached | Free transfer (Released) | 29 September 2012 | |
| 17 | MF | (Hong Kong) Lee Hong Lim | South China | Free transfer | 28 May 2012 | |
| 20 | FW | (Hong Kong) Godfred Karikari | Henan Jianye | Undisclosed Fee | 14 June 2012 | |
| 26 | MF | (Hong Kong) Lai Yiu Cheong | Tuen Mun | Free transfer | 13 July 2012 | |
| 27 | GK | (Japan) Hisanori Takada | | End of contract | | |
| 28 | FW | (Brazil) Leandro Carrijo Silva | | End of contract | | |
| 33 | DF | (Hong Kong) Ng Wai Chiu | South China | End of loan | | |

== Stats ==
=== Squad Stats ===
| | | | | Total | | | | Hong Kong First Division League | | Senior Challenge Shield | | FA Cup | | |
| N | Pos. | Name | Nat. | GS | App | Gls | Min | App | Gls | App | Gls | App | Gls | Notes |
|---|---|---|---|---|---|---|---|---|---|---|---|---|---|---|
| 1 | GK | Ng Yat Hoi | (Hong Kong) | 4 | 4 | -5 | 360 | 3 | -5 | 1 | | | | (−) GA |
| 16 | GK | Ho Kwok Chuen | (Hong Kong) | 8 | 8 | -7 | 720 | 5 | -6 | | | 3 | -1 | (−) GA, joined in January 2013 |
| 19 | GK | Li Jian | (China) | 13 | 13 | -23 | 1170 | 10 | -18 | 1 | -2 | 2 | -3 | (−) GA |
| 22 | GK | Yuen Ho Chun | (Hong Kong) | | | | | | | | | | | (−) GA |
| 30 | GK | Josip Škorić | (Hong Kong) | | | | | | | | | | | (−) GA, joined in March 2013 |
| 32 | GK | Poon Kwong Tak | (Hong Kong) | | | | | | | | | | | (−) GA, joined in January 2013 |
| 2 | LB | Lee Wai Lun | (Hong Kong) | 17 | 22 | 1 | 1483 | 16 | | 2 | | 4 | 1 | |
| 3 | RB | Fung Kai Hong | (Hong Kong) | | 4 | | 40 | 3 | | | | 1 | | |
| 4 | CB | Deng Jinghuang | (Hong Kong) | 19 | 19 | 3 | 1689 | 14 | 3 | 1 | | 4 | | |
| 5 | CB | Cesar | (Brazil) | 12 | 12 | 1 | 1011 | 7 | 1 | | | 5 | | Joined in January 2013 |
| 13 | LB | Li Ngai Hoi | (Hong Kong) | | 5 | | 47 | 4 | | | | 1 | | |
| 15 | CB | Cheung Chun Hei | (Hong Kong) | | 1 | | 14 | 1 | | | | | | |
| 20 | CB | Igor Miović | (Serbia) | 13 | 13 | 1 | 1170 | 8 | | | | 5 | 1 | Joined in January 2013 |
| 21 | RB | Tong Kin Man | (Hong Kong) | 14 | 20 | 1 | 1291 | 14 | 1 | 1 | | 5 | | |
| 28 | RB | Lo Chun Kit | (Hong Kong) | 17 | 19 | 1 | 1473 | 13 | 1 | 1 | | 5 | | |
| 33 | CB | So Wai Chuen | (Hong Kong) | 1 | 6 | | 140 | 4 | | | | 2 | | |
| | CB | Ng Wai Chiu | (Hong Kong) | 11 | 11 | 2 | 988 | 9 | 2 | 2 | | | | Left in December 2012 |
| | CB | Costa De Miranda Natanael | (Brazil) | 1 | 3 | | 112 | 2 | | 1 | | | | Joined in September 2012; Left in January 2013 |
| | CB | Juninho | (Brazil) | 11 | 11 | | 982 | 10 | | 1 | | | | Left in January 2013 |
| 7 | CM | Chuck Yiu Kwok | (Hong Kong) | 1 | 8 | | 204 | 6 | | 2 | | | | |
| 8 | RM | Xu Deshuai | (Hong Kong) | 20 | 23 | 3 | 1866 | 17 | 2 | 1 | | 5 | 1 | |
| 10 | DM | Eugene Mbome | (Cameroon) | 18 | 20 | 1 | 1631 | 15 | 1 | 2 | | 3 | | |
| 17 | CM | Chan Pak Hang | (Hong Kong) | 10 | 13 | 1 | 751 | 8 | | 1 | | 4 | 1 | |
| 18 | DM | Bai He | (Hong Kong) | 13 | 13 | | 1109 | 8 | | | | 5 | | Joined in January 2013 on loan from South China |
| 24 | RM | Ju Yingzhi | (Hong Kong) | 19 | 22 | 5 | 1703 | 15 | 4 | 2 | | 5 | 1 | |
| 27 | CM | Lee Kwan-Yoo | (South Korea) | | | | | | | | | | | Joined in January 2013 |
| | CM | Xiao Yifeng | (China) | | 1 | | 12 | 1 | | | | | | Left in September 2012 |
| | AM | Ngan Lok Fung | (Hong Kong) | 2 | 2 | | 121 | 2 | | | | | | Returned Kitchee in January 2013 |
| | AM | Thiago Constância | (Brazil) | 4 | 6 | 2 | 330 | 4 | 1 | 2 | 1 | | | Joined in September 2012; Left in January 2013 |
| 9 | FW | Kim Dong-Ryeol | (South Korea) | 2 | 6 | | 172 | 4 | | | | 2 | | Joined in January 2013 |
| 11 | FW | Vladimir Karalić | (Bosnia and Herzegovina) | 8 | 12 | 3 | 746 | 7 | 2 | | | 5 | 1 | Joined in January 2013 |
| 23 | FW | Jaimes Mckee | (Hong Kong) | 23 | 24 | 18 | 2084 | 18 | 16 | 2 | | 4 | 2 | |
| | FW | Sandro | (Brazil) | 6 | 10 | 1 | 634 | 9 | 1 | 1 | | | | Left in January 2013 |
| | FW | Jone da Silva Pinto | (Brazil) | 8 | 11 | | 658 | 9 | | 2 | | | | Left in January 2013 |

Last updated: 11 May 2013
Ordered by Position
0 shown as blank

=== Top scorers ===
As of 4 May 2013

| Place | Position | Nationality | Number | Name | First Division League | Senior Challenge Shield | FA Cup | Total |
|---|---|---|---|---|---|---|---|---|
| 1 | FW | (Hong Kong) | 23 | Jaimes McKee | 16 | 0 | 2 | 18 |
| 2 | MF | (Hong Kong) (China) | 24 | Ju Yingzhi | 4 | 0 | 1 | 5 |
| =3 | DF | (Hong Kong) | 4 | Deng Jinghuang | 3 | 0 | 0 | 3 |
| =3 | FW | (Hong Kong) | 8 | Xu Deshuai | 3 | 0 | 0 | 3 |
| =3 | FW | (Bosnia and Herzegovina) | 11 | Vladimir Karalić | 2 | 0 | 1 | 3 |
| =6 | DF | (Hong Kong) | | Ng Wai Chiu | 2 | 0 | 0 | 2 |
| =6 | MF | (Brazil) | | Thiago Constância | 1 | 1 | 0 | 2 |
| =8 | DF | (Hong Kong) | 2 | Lee Wai Lun | 0 | 0 | 1 | 1 |
| =8 | DF | (Brazil) | 5 | Paulo Cesar Fonseca Nunes | 1 | 0 | 0 | 1 |
| =8 | FW | (Brazil) | 9 | Sandro | 1 | 0 | 0 | 1 |
| =8 | MF | (Cameroon) | 10 | Eugene Mbome | 1 | 0 | 0 | 1 |
| =8 | MF | (Hong Kong) | 17 | Chan Pak Hang | 0 | 0 | 1 | 1 |
| =8 | DF | (Serbia) | 20 | Igor Miovic | 0 | 0 | 1 | 1 |
| =8 | DF | (Hong Kong) | 21 | Tong Kin Man | 1 | 0 | 0 | 1 |
| =8 | DF | (Hong Kong) | 28 | Lo Chun Kit | 1 | 0 | 0 | 1 |
| TOTALS | | | | | 36 | 1 | 7 | 44 |

=== Disciplinary record ===
As of 11 May 2013

| Number | Nationality | Position | Name | First Division League | | Senior Challenge Shield | | FA Cup | | Total | |
| Number | Nationality | Position | Name | Booked | Sent off (straight red) | Booked | Sent off (straight red) | Booked | Sent off (straight red) | Booked | Sent off (straight red) |
| 2 | DF | (Hong Kong) | Lee Wai Lun | 4 | 0 | 1 | 0 | 0 | 0 | 5 | 0 |
| 3 | DF | (Hong Kong) | Fung Kai Hong | 0 | 0 | 0 | 0 | 1 | 0 | 1 | 0 |
| 4 | DF | (Hong Kong) (China) | Deng Jinghuang | 4 | 0 | 0 | 0 | 0 | 0 | 4 | 0 |
| 5 | DF | (Brazil) | Paulo Cesar Fonseca Nunes | 0 | 0 | 0 | 0 | 1 | 1 | 1 | 1 |
| 8 | MF | (Hong Kong) | Xu Deshuai | 2 | 0 | 1 | 0 | 0 | 0 | 3 | 0 |
| 10 | MF | (Cameroon) | Eugene Mbome | 7 | 0 | 1 | 0 | 0 | 0 | 8 | 0 |
| 16 | GK | (Hong Kong) | Ho Kwok Chuen | 2 | 0 | 0 | 0 | 0 | 0 | 2 | 0 |
| 17 | MF | (Hong Kong) | Chan Pak Hang | 1 | 0 | 0 | 0 | 1 | 0 | 2 | 0 |
| 18 | MF | (Hong Kong) (China) | Bai He | 3 | 0 | 0 | 0 | 0 | 0 | 3 | 0 |
| 19 | GK | (China) | Li Jian | 2 | 0 | 0 | 0 | 0 | 0 | 2 | 0 |
| 20 | DF | (Serbia) | Igor Miović | 1 | 0 | 0 | 0 | 3 | 0 | 4 | 0 |
| 21 | DF | (Hong Kong) | Tong Kin Man | 4 | 1 | 0 | 0 | 1 | 0 | 5 | 1 |
| 23 | FW | (Hong Kong) | Jaimes McKee | 0 | 0 | 1 | 0 | 0 | 0 | 1 | 0 |
| 24 | MF | (Hong Kong) | Ju Yingzhi | 1 | 0 | 0 | 0 | 0 | 0 | 1 | 0 |
| 28 | DF | (Hong Kong) | Lo Chun Kit | 5 | 0 | 0 | 0 | 0 | 0 | 5 | 0 |
| 33 | DF | (Hong Kong) | So Wai Chuen | 1 | 0 | 0 | 0 | 0 | 0 | 1 | 0 |
| | DF | (Hong Kong) | Ng Wai Chiu | 2 | 0 | 1 | 0 | 0 | 0 | 3 | 0 |
| | MF | (Hong Kong) | Ngan Lok Fung | 1 | 0 | 0 | 0 | 0 | 0 | 1 | 0 |
| | DF | (Brazil) | Juninho | 2 | 0 | 0 | 0 | 0 | 0 | 2 | 0 |
| | FW | (Brazil) | Sandro | 1 | 0 | 0 | 0 | 0 | 0 | 1 | 0 |
| | FW | (Brazil) | Jone da Silva Pinto | 1 | 0 | 0 | 0 | 0 | 0 | 1 | 0 |
| | MF | (Brazil) | Thiago Constância | 2 | 0 | 1 | 0 | 0 | 0 | 3 | 0 |
| TOTALS | | | | 46 | 1 | 6 | 0 | 7 | 1 | 59 | 2 |

== Competitions ==
=== Overall ===
| Competition | Started round | Final position / round | First match | Last match |
|---|---|---|---|---|
| Hong Kong First Division League | — | 5th | 31 August 2012 | 4 May 2013 |
| Senior Challenge Shield | Quarter-finals | Quarter-finals | 28 September 2012 | 24 November 2012 |
| FA Cup | Quarter-finals | Runner-up | 16 February 2013 | 11 May 2013 |

Updated to match played 11 May 2013
Source: Competitions

=== First Division League ===
==== Classification ====
| Pos | Team | Pld | W | D | L | GF | GA | GD | Pts | Qualification or relegation |
|---|---|---|---|---|---|---|---|---|---|---|
| 3 | Tuen Mun | 18 | 8 | 4 | 6 | 29 | 31 | −2 | 28 | 2012–13 Hong Kong Season play-off (Note: Southern qualified for the play-offs as Kitchee defeated Sun Pegasus in the FA Cup while they have guaranteed a place for the play-offs, meaning the league 4th place qualifies.) |
| 4 | Southern | 18 | 6 | 6 | 6 | 24 | 27 | −3 | 24 | 2012–13 Hong Kong Season play-off |
| 5 | Sun Pegasus | 18 | 4 | 9 | 5 | 35 | 29 | +6 | 21 | |
| 6 | Hong Kong Rangers | 18 | 5 | 5 | 8 | 32 | 52 | −20 | 20 (Note: HKR 3–3 CIT, HKR 2–2 SUN, HKR 1–1 YHK; CIT 2–3 HKR, CIT 1–2 SUN, CIT 3–0 YHK; SUN 2–2 HKR, SUN 1–1 CIT, SUN 1–1 YHK; YHK 2–4 HKR, YHK 1–1 CIT, YHK 2–0 SUN) | |
| 7 | Sunray Cave JC Sun Hei | 18 | 4 | 8 | 6 | 26 | 33 | −7 | 20 | |

Updated to match(es) played on 26 May 2013. Source:
Rules for classification: 1) points; 2) head-to-head points; 3) head-to-head goal difference; 4) head-to-head goals scored; 5) goal difference; 6) number of goals scored.

==== Results summary ====
| Overall | | | | | | | | Home | | | | | | Away | | | | | |
| Pld | W | D | L | GF | GA | GD | Pts | W | D | L | GF | GA | GD | W | D | L | GF | GA | GD |
|---|---|---|---|---|---|---|---|---|---|---|---|---|---|---|---|---|---|---|---|
| 18 | 4 | 9 | 5 | 35 | 29 | +6 | 21 | 2 | 4 | 3 | 13 | 12 | +1 | 2 | 5 | 2 | 22 | 17 | +5 |

Last updated: 4 May 2013.

==== Results by round ====
| Round | 1 | 2 | 3 | 4 | 5 | 6 | 7 | 8 | 9 | 10 | 11 | 12 | 13 | 14 | 15 | 16 | 17 | 18 |
|---|---|---|---|---|---|---|---|---|---|---|---|---|---|---|---|---|---|---|
| Ground | H | H | A | A | A | A | H | H | H | H | A | A | H | A | A | H | H | A |
| Result | D | L | W | L | D | L | W | L | L | D | D | D | W | D | D | D | D | W |
| Position | 5 | 7 | 6 | 7 | 6 | 7 | 5 | 8 | 8 | 8 | 8 | 9 | 5 | 7 | 7 | 8 | 7 | 5 |

Updated to match(es) played on 4 May 2013. Source:
A = Away; H = Home; W = Win; D = Draw; L = Loss

== Matches ==
Win Draw Loss Void

=== Pre-season ===
| 9 August 2012 | Panyu Pearl (China) | 1 – 5 | (Hong Kong) Sun Pegasus | Guangzhou, China |
| | | | Jaimes McKee; Xu Deshuai; Jone |

=== Competitive ===
==== First Division League ====
| 31 August 2012 Week 1 | Sun Pegasus | 3 – 3 | Wofoo Tai Po | Yuen Long, New Territories |
| 20:00 (GMT+8) | Ng Wai Chiu 1'; Mckee 17', 51'; Lee Wai Lun (yellow card) 18'; Jone (yellow card) 42'; Ng Wai Chiu (yellow card) 45' | Report | 19' (yellow card) 41' To Hon To; 53' Lui Chi Hing; 84' Christian Annan | Stadium: Yuen Long Stadium (Capatity:4,932); Attendance: 1,332; Referee: Ng Kai Lam; Assistant referees: Lam Chi Ho, Chung Ming Sang; Fourth official: Yu Chun San |

| 8 September 2012 Week 2 | Sun Pegasus | 1 – 2 | Biu Chun Rangers | Yuen Long, New Territories |
| 17:30 (GMT+8) | McKee 45+1'; Deng Jinghuang (yellow card) 50' | Report | 21', 30' Saric | Stadium: Yuen Long Stadium (Capatity:4,932); Attendance: 549; Referee: Tong Kui Sum; Assistant referees: Ho Wai Sing, Lam Nai Kei; Fourth official: Cheng Oi Cho |

| 15 September 2012 Week 3 | Tuen Mun | 2 – 4 | Sun Pegasus | Tuen Mun, New Territories |
| 14:30 (GMT+8) | Diego (yellow card) 29'; Daniel 39'; Law Ka Lok (yellow card) 73'; Chao Pengfei 77' | Report | 10', 90' McKee; (yellow card) 51' (goal) 79' Sandro; 67' Deng Jinghuang; (yellow card) 74' Mbome | Stadium: Tuen Mun Tang Siu Kin Sports Ground (Capatity:2,200); Attendance: 919; Referee: Liu Kwok Man; Assistant referees: Chow Chun Kit, Yu Chun San; Fourth official: Chan Ming Siu |

| 1 October 2012 Week 4 | Citizen | 2 – 1 | Sun Pegasus | Mong Kok, Kowloon |
| 14:30 (GMT+8) | Detinho 75'; Sham Kwok Keung 78' | Report | 31' McKee; (yellow card) 88' Mbome | Stadium: Mong Kok Stadium (Capatity:6,680); Attendance: 1,094; Referee: Tong Kui Sum; Assistant referees: Lam Nai Kei, Ho Wai Sing; Fourth official: Ng Kai Lam |

| 6 October 2012 Week 5 | Southern | 3 – 3 | Sun Pegasus | Aberdeen, Hong Kong Island |
| 14:30 (GMT+8) | Carril 23'; Rubén 75'; Chow Ka Wa 78'; Landon Ling (yellow card) 80' | Report | 28', 73' Ju Yingzhi; 39' Ng Wai Chiu | Stadium: Aberdeen Sports Ground (Capatity:9,000); Attendance: 403; Referee: Cheng Oi Cho; Assistant referees: Chan Shui Hung, Lam Shing Yan, Franky; Fourth official: Yu Kin Fung |

| 21 October 2012 Week 6 | Kitchee | 4 – 2 | Sun Pegasus | Tseung Kwan O, New Territories |
| 17:30 (GMT+8) | Jordi 39', 66'; Couñago 64', 77'; Liu Quankun (yellow card) 82' | Report | (yellow card) 29' Mbome; (yellow card) 42' Li Jian; 57', 63' McKee; (yellow card) 88' Lee Wai Lun; (yellow card) 89' Chuck Yiu Kwok | Stadium: Tseung Kwan O Sports Ground (Capatity:3,500); Attendance: 850; Referee: Ng Chiu Kok; Assistant referees: Chow Chun Kit, Chung Ming Sang; Fourth official: Yu Chun San |

| 3 November 2012 Week 7 | Sun Pegasus | 2 – 0 | Sunray Cave JC Sun Hei | Yuen Long, New Territories |
| 17:30 (GMT+8) | Thiago (yellow card) 26'; Juninho (yellow card) 70'; Mbome 75'; Tong Kin Man 79' | Report | (yellow card) 43' Cheung Kwok Ming | Stadium: Yuen Long Stadium (Capatity:4,932); Attendance: 529; Referee: Ng Kai Lam; Assistant referees: Ho Wai Sing, Chung Ming Sang; Fourth official: Yu Chun San |

| 10 November 2012 Week 8 | Sun Pegasus | 1 – 2 | Yokohama FC Hong Kong | Yuen Long, New Territories |
| 17:30 (GMT+8) | Thiago 11'; Ju Yingzhi (yellow card) 50'; Deng Jinghuang (yellow card) 81'; Mbome (yellow card) 86' | Report | 44', 74' Yoshitake; (yellow card) 47' Fong Pak Lun; (yellow card) 81' (yellow-red card) 90+3' Lau Cheuk Hin | Stadium: Yuen Long Stadium (Capatity:4,932); Attendance: 424; Referee: Ho Wai Sing; Assistant referees: Tong Kui Sum, Chung Ming Sang; Fourth official: Yu Chun San |

| 22 December 2012 Week 9 | Sun Pegasus | 0 – 3 | South China | Yuen Long, New Territories |
| 17:30 (GMT+8) | Lo Chun Kit (yellow card) 28'; Ng Wai Chiu (yellow card) 31'; Ngan Lok Fung (yellow card) 50'; Thiago (yellow card) 73' | Report | (yellow card) 60' Ticão; 65' Kwok Kin Pong; 79' Cheng Lai Hin; 85' Lee Wai Lim; (yellow card) 90+1' Joel | Stadium: Yuen Long Stadium (Capatity:4,932); Attendance: 1,616; Referee: Ng Chiu Kok; Assistant referees: Ho Wai Sing, Chung Ming Sang; Fourth official: Lam Shing Yan |

| 19 January 2013 Week 10 | Sun Pegasus | 1 – 1 | Southern | Yuen Long, New Territories |
| 17:30 (GMT+8) | Lee Wai Lun (yellow card) 34'; Xu Deshuai (yellow card) 39' (goal) 88' | Report | (yellow card) 7' Lander; 33' Dieguito; (yellow card) 39' Landon Ling | Stadium: Yuen Long Stadium (Capatity:4,932); Attendance: 460; Referee: Tong Kui Sum; Assistant referees: Chung Ming Sang, Amarjit Singh Sarao; Fourth official: Cheng Oi Cho |

| 2 February 2013 Week 11 | South China | 1 – 1 | Sun Pegasus | So Kon Po, Hong Kong Island |
| 17:30 (GMT+8) | Kwok Kin Pong (yellow card) 13'; Dhiego 90+1' | Report | (yellow card) 2' Deng Jinghuang; (yellow card) 2' Chan Pak Hang; (yellow card) 4' Tong Kin Man; 10' (pen.) McKee; (yellow card) 42' Bai He; (yellow card) 60' Xu Deshuai; (yellow card) 63' Lo Chun Kit; (yellow card) 90' Li Jian | Stadium: Hong Kong Stadium (Capatity:40,000); Attendance: 1,137; Referee: Liu Kwok Man; Assistant referees: Chow Chun Kit, Lam Shing Yan Franky; Fourth official: Lui Siu Chuen |

| 24 February 2013 Week 12 | Yokohama FC Hong Kong | 1 – 1 | Sun Pegasus | Siu Sai Wan, Hong Kong Island |
| 17:30 (GMT+8) | Mijanović 4'; Lau Cheuk Hin (yellow card) 36'; Leung Kwun Chung (yellow card) 90+4' | Report | (yellow card) 5' So Wai Chuen; (yellow card) 38' Mbome; (yellow card) 42' Bai He; (yellow card) 68' Miović; 77' Deng Jinghuang; (yellow card) 84' Tong Kin Man | Stadium: Siu Sai Wan Sports Ground (Capatity:12,000); Attendance: 503; Referee: Ng Chiu Kok; Assistant referees: Lui Siu Chuen, Fok Pong Shing; Fourth official: Cheng Oi Cho |

| 1 March 2013 Week 13 | Sun Pegasus | 4 – 0 | Tuen Mun | Yuen Long, New Territories |
| 20:00 (GMT+8) | McKee 6', 29'; Lo Chun Kit 8'; Karalić 36'; Lee Wai Lun (yellow card) 90' | Report | | Stadium: Yuen Long Stadium (Capatity:4,932); Attendance: 597; Referee: Cheng Oi Cho; Assistant referees: Poon Ming Fai, Yu Chun San; Fourth official: Tong Kui Sum |

| 18 March 2013 Week 14 | Sunray Cave JC Sun Hei | 0 – 0 | Sun Pegasus | Mong Kok, Kowloon |
| 20:00 (GMT+8) | Barry (yellow card) 21'; Zhang Chunhui (yellow card) 65' | Report | (yellow card) 64' Mbome; (yellow card) 86' Tong Kin Man | Stadium: Mong Kok Stadium (Capatity:6,680); Attendance: 506; Referee: Cheng Oi Cho; Assistant referees: Lam Chi Ho, Chan Ming Siu; Fourth official: Lui Siu Chuen |

| 31 March 2013 Week 15 | Wofoo Tai Po | 2 – 2 | Sun Pegasus | Tai Po, New Territories |
| 14:30 (GMT+8) | Aender 45+2'; Clayton (yellow card) 63'; Ye Jia 87' | Report | 31' Xu Deshuai; 75' Cesar; (yellow card) 80' Lo Chun Kit | Stadium: Tai Po Sports Ground (Capatity:3,000); Attendance: 888; Referee: Ho Wai Sing; Assistant referees: Chow Chun Kit, Chung Ming Sang; Fourth official: Yau Tsz Yeung |

| 12 April 2013 Week 16 | Sun Pegasus | 0 – 0 | Citizen | Yuen Long, New Territories |
| 20:00 (GMT+8) | Ho Kwok Chuen (yellow card) 37'; Lo Chun Kit (yellow card) 74'; Bai He (yellow card) 84' | Report | (yellow card) 9' Chan Hin Kwong; (yellow card) 39' Nakamura; (yellow card) 58' So Loi Keung; (yellow card) 82' Sham Kwok Fai; (yellow card) 87' Hélio | Stadium: Yuen Long Stadium (Capatity:4,932); Attendance: 397; Referee: Ng Kai Lam; Assistant referees: Chung Ming Sang, Yu Chun San; Fourth official: Chan Shui Hung |

| 19 April 2013 Week 17 | Sun Pegasus | 1 – 1 | Kitchee | Yuen Long, New Territories |
| 20:00 (GMT+8) | Mbome (yellow card) 35'; Ho Kwok Chuen (yellow card) 45+2'; Deng Jinghuang 55' (yellow card) 64' | Report | 6' (pen.) Yago; (yellow card) 76' Couñago; (yellow card) 83' Cheng Siu Wai | Stadium: Yuen Long Stadium (Capatity:4,932); Attendance: 595; Referee: Cheng Oi Cho; Assistant referees: Ng Chiu Kok, Yu Chun San; Fourth official: Chan Ming Siu |

| 4 May 2013 Week 18 | Biu Chun Rangers | 2 – 8 | Sun Pegasus | Sham Shui Po, Kowloon |
| 15:30 (GMT+8) | Giovane 83', 89' | Report | 21', 53' Ju Yingzhi; 29', 64', 72', 82', 85' McKee; 90' Karalić | Stadium: Sham Shui Po Sports Ground (Capatity:2,194); Attendance: 426; Referee: Ho Wai Sing; Assistant referees: Chung Ming Sang, Yu Chun San; Fourth official: Cheng Oi Cho |

==== Senior Challenge Shield ====
===== Quarter-finals =====
| 28 October 2012 1st leg | Southern | 0 – 1 | Sun Pegasus | Aberdeen, Hong Kong Island |
| 14:30(GMT+8) | Dieguito (yellow card) 29' | Report | (yellow card) 43' Lee Wai Lun; (yellow card) 75' Ng Wai Chiu; 90+3' Thiago | Stadium: Aberdeen Sports Ground (Capacity: 9,000); Attendance: 349; Referee: Ng Kai Lam; Assistant referees: Chan Shui Hung, Yu Chun San; Fourth official: Sarao, Amarjit Singh |

| 24 November 2012 2nd leg | Sun Pegasus | 0 – 2 (1 – 2 agg.) | Southern | Yuen Long, New Territories |
| 17:30(GMT+8) | McKee (yellow card) 37'; Mbome (yellow card) 51'; Thiago (yellow card) 78'; Xu Deshuai (yellow card) 83' | Report | 27' Chow Ka Wa; (yellow card) 32' Lander; 75' Carril; (yellow card) 90+1' Landon Ling; (yellow card) 90+3' Ip Chung Long | Stadium: Yuen Long Stadium (Capacity: 4,932); Attendance: 406; Referee: Ng Chiu Kok; Assistant referees: Ho Wai Sing, Yu Chun San; Fourth official: Luk Kin Sun |

==== FA Cup ====
===== Quarter-finals =====
| 16 February 2013 1st leg | Tuen Mun | 2 – 3 | Sun Pegasus | Tuen Mun, New Territories |
| 14:30(GMT+8) | Kwok Wing Sun (yellow card) 14' (yellow-red card) 42'; Daniel 24'; Diego 88' | Report | 10' McKee; 15' (yellow card) 25' Miović; (yellow card) 20' (yellow-red card) 59' Cesar; 90+7' Lee Wai Lun | Stadium: Tuen Mun Tang Shiu Kin Sports Ground (Capacity: 2,200); Attendance: 722; Referee: Ng Kai Lam; Assistant referees: Ho Wai Sing, Yu Chun San; Fourth official: Lam Nai Kei |

| 10 March 2013 2nd leg | Sun Pegasus | 3 – 1 (6 – 3 agg.) | Tuen Mun | Yuen Long, New Territories |
| 17:30(GMT+8) | Ju Yingzhi 38'; McKee 73'; Karalić 82' | Report | 52' (yellow card) 69' Beto | Stadium: Yuen Long Stadium (Capacity: 4,932); Attendance: 536; Referee: Ng Chiu Kok; Assistant referees: Lui Siu Chuen, Yu Chun San; Fourth official: Luk Kin Sun |

===== Semi-finals =====
| 6 April 2013 1st leg | Sun Pegasus | 1 – 0 | Wofoo Tai Po | Yuen Long, New Territories |
| 17:30(GMT+8) | Tong Kin Man (yellow card) 29'; Lo Chun Kit (yellow card) 70'; Xu Deshuai 77' | Report | (yellow card) 90+3' Aender; (yellow card) 90+5' Chan Sze Wing | Stadium: Yuen Long Stadium (Capacity: 4,932); Attendance: 606; Referee: Liu Kwok Man; Assistant referees: Ng Chiu Kok, Lam Nai Kei; Fourth official: Yu Chun San |

| 27 April 2013 2nd leg | Wofoo Tai Po | 0 – 1 (0 – 2 agg.) | Sun Pegasus | Tai Po, New Territories |
| 14:30(GMT+8) | Alex (yellow card) 31'; Clayton (yellow card) 63' | Report | 35' (yellow card) 68' Chan Pak Hang; (yellow card) 57' Tong Kin Man; (yellow card) 70' Fung Kai Hong; (yellow card) 72' Miović | Stadium: Tai Po Sports Ground (Capacity: 3,000); Referee: Tong Kui Sum; Assistant referees: Ho Wai Sing, Chan Shui Hung; Fourth official: Luk Kin Sun |

===== Final =====
| 11 May 2013 | Sun Pegasus | 0 – 1 | Kitchee | So Kon Po, Hong Kong Island |
| 18:00(GMT+8) | Miović (yellow card) 24'; Cesar (yellow card) 90+1' | Report | (yellow card) 39' Chu Siu Kei; 57' Couñago | Stadium: Hong Kong Stadium (Capacity: 40,000); Attendance: 2,963; Referee: Cheng Oi Cho; Assistant referees: Chow Chun Kit, Chan Shui Hung; Fourth official: Tong Kui Sum; Man of the Match: Couñago (Kitchee) |
