= 2012–13 Kitchee SC season =

Kitchee SC
2012–13 season
- General Manager: Ken Ng
- Head Coach: Josep Gombau
- Home ground: Tseung Kwan O Sports Ground
- First Division: 2nd
- Senior Shield: Quarter-finals
- FA Cup: Winners
- Play-offs: Winners
- AFC Cup: Quarter-finals
- Top goalscorer: League: Jordi Tarrés (7); Pablo Couñago (7); All: Jordi Tarrés (18)
- Highest home attendance: 3,613 (14 April vs South China, First Division)
- Lowest home attendance: 457 (31 January vs Biu Chun Rangers, First Division)
- Average home league attendance: 1,199 (in all competitions)
Home colours	Away colours

The 2012–13 season is Kitchee SC's 82nd season in football, and the 34th season in the Hong Kong First Division League. Kitchee started as defending champions having won the league, as well as the Hong Kong FA Cup in 2011–12, and was looking to retain their title. The club also played in the AFC Cup for the third time.

== Key events ==
- 29 May 2012: Spanish forward Jonathan Carril joins Kitchee for an undisclosed fee from CF Palencia.
- 31 May 2012: General manager Ken Ng announced that Hong Kong forward Cheng Siu Wai joins Kitchee for an undisclosed fee from Sunray Cave JC Sun Hei, while Tsang Chi Hau, Tsang Kin Fong and Li Ngai Hoi return after a loan spell in Hong Kong Sapling for a season.
- 7 July 2012: General manager Ken Ng announced that Tsang Kin Fong and Ngan Lok Fung are loaned out to Sunray Cave JC Sun Hei and Sun Pegasus respectively.
- 30 July 2012: Kitchee played out a 2–2 draw with English Premier League team Arsenal at the Hong Kong Stadium. The match also saw off Roberto Losada, who retired from playing football and will be the assistant coach of Kitchee after the match.
- 7 January 2013: Hong Kong international left back Cheung Kin Fung signed a 6-month loan contract from Sunray Cave JC Sun Hei. At the same time, James Ha and Liang Zicheng are loaned to them until the end of the season.
- 31 January 2013: 3 youth team players, Chan Ka Ho, So Chun Yin and Wong Tsz Chun are promoted to the first team.
- 27 February 2013: Canadian midfielder Matt Lam joins the club as a free transfer. He signed an 18-month contract with the club. He is registered as a local player as he holds a HKID card.
- 11 May 2013: The club win their first title of the season as they defeated Sun Pegasus 1–0 in the final to claim the champions of FA Cup title.
- 14 May 2013: The club reached the AFC Cup quarter-finals for the first time in club history after beating Malaysia Super League side Kelantan FA 2–0.

== Players ==
=== First team ===
As of 27 February 2013.

Note: Flags indicate national team as defined under FIFA eligibility rules; some limited exceptions apply. Players may hold more than one non-FIFA nationality.

No.	Pos.	Nation	Player
1	GK	HKG	Wang Zhenpeng
2	DF	ESP	Fernando Recio^{NP}
3	DF	ESP	Dani Cancela^{NP}
5	DF	PAK	Zesh Rehman^{NP}
6	DF	HKG	Gao Wen
7	MF	HKG	Chu Siu Kei (captain)
8	FW	ESP	Pablo Couñago^{NP}
10	MF	HKG	Lam Ka Wai
11	FW	ESP	Yago González^{NP}
12	DF	HKG	Lo Kwan Yee (vice captain)
13	FW	HKG	Chan Man Fai
14	DF	HKG	Liu Quankun

No.	Pos.	Nation	Player
15	MF	CAN	Matt Lam
16	DF	HKG	Tsang Chi Hau
17	GK	HKG	Chan Ka Ho
18	FW	ESP	Jordi Tarrés^{NP}
19	MF	HKG	Huang Yang
20	DF	HKG	Cheung Kin Fung (On loan from Sunray Cave JC Sun Hei)
21	DF	HKG	Tsang Kam To
22	MF	HKG	Lo Chi Kwan
23	GK	CHN	Guo Jianqiao
28	FW	HKG	Cheng Siu Wai
30	MF	HKG	So Chun Yin
31	MF	HKG	Wong Tsz Chun

Remarks:
^{NP} These players are registered as foreign players.

==== Out on loan ====
Note: Flags indicate national team as defined under FIFA eligibility rules; some limited exceptions apply. Players may hold more than one non-FIFA nationality.

No.	Pos.	Nation	Player
9	FW	CHN	Liang Zicheng (at Sunray Cave JC Sun Hei until the end of the 2012–13 season)
15	MF	HKG	James Ha (at Sunray Cave JC Sun Hei until the end of the 2012–13 season)
24	MF	CAN	Landon Ling (at Southern until the end of the 2012–13 season)

No.	Pos.	Nation	Player
30	MF	HKG	Leung Ka Hai (at Sunray Cave JC Sun Hei until the end of the 2012–13 season)
—	FW	ESP	Jonathan Carril (at Southern until the end of the 2012–13 season)

=== Transfers ===
==== In ====
Squad #	Position	Player	Transferred from	Fee	Date	Team	Source
8	DF	(Spain) Jonathan Carril	(Spain) CF Palencia	Undisclosed	29 May 2012	First Team	
28	FW	(Hong Kong) Cheng Siu Wai	(Hong Kong) Sunray Cave JC Sun Hei	Undisclosed	31 May 2012	First Team	
16	DF	(Hong Kong) Tsang Chi Hau	Hong Kong Sapling	Loan return	31 May 2012	First Team	
	FW	(Hong Kong) Tsang Kin Fong	Hong Kong Sapling	Loan return	31 May 2012	First Team	
	DF	(Hong Kong) Li Ngai Hoi	Hong Kong Sapling	Loan return	31 May 2012	First Team	
	GK	(Hong Kong) Wong Tsz Him	Hong Kong Sapling	Loan return		First Team	
27	DF	(New Zealand) Shay Spitz	Free agent	Free transfer	12 September 2012	First Team	
8	FW	(Spain) Pablo Couñago	(Vietnam) Đồng Tâm Long An	Free transfer	2 October 2012	First Team	
17	GK	(Hong Kong) Chan Ka Ho	Youth Team	N/A	31 January 2013	First Team	
30	MF	(Hong Kong) So Chun Yin	Youth Team	N/A	31 January 2013	First Team	
31	MF	(Hong Kong) Wong Tsz Chun	Youth Team	N/A	31 January 2013	First Team	
15	MF	(Canada) Matt Lam	Free Agent	Free transfer	27 February 2013	First Team	

==== Out ====
Squad #	Position	Player	Transferred to	Fee	Date	Source
16	MF	(Spain) Jose Maria Diaz Munoz	(Hong Kong) Sunray Cave JC Sun Hei	Free transfer	16 August 2012	
26	FW	(Hong Kong) Chao Pengfei	(Hong Kong) Biu Chun Rangers	Loan return	31 May 2012	
	GK	(Hong Kong) Wong Tsz Him	(Hong Kong) Biu Chun Rangers	Undisclosed	6 July 2012	
17	GK	(China) Li Jian	(Hong Kong) Sun Pegasus	On Loan	19 July 2012	
27	DF	(New Zealand) Shay Spitz	(United States) Los Angeles Blues	Free transfer	27 March 2013	

==== Loan in ====
#	Position	Player	Loaned from	Date	Loan expires	Team	Source
20	DF	(Hong Kong) Cheung Kin Fung	Sunray Cave JC Sun Hei	7 January 2013	End of season	First team	

==== Loan out ====
#	Position	Player	Loaned to	Date	Loan expires	Team	Source
8	MF	(Hong Kong) Ngan Lok Fung	(Hong Kong) Sun Pegasus	7 July 2012	31 December 2012	First team	
24	DF	(Canada) Landon Lloyd Ling	(Hong Kong) Southern		End of the season	First team	
27	FW	(Hong Kong) Tsang Kin Fong	(Hong Kong) Sunray Cave JC Sun Hei	7 July 2012	End of the season	First team	
28	MF	(China) Su Yang	(Hong Kong) Sunray Cave JC Sun Hei		End of the season	First team	
29	FW	(Hong Kong) Chan Ho Fing	(Hong Kong) Tai Chung		End of the season	Reserves	
30	MF	(Hong Kong) Leung Robson Augusto Ka Hai	(Hong Kong) Sunray Cave JC Sun Hei		End of the season	First team	
	DF	(Hong Kong) Li Ngai Hoi	(Hong Kong) Sun Pegasus	19 July 2012	End of the season	First team	
8	FW	(Spain) Jonathan Carril	(Hong Kong) Southern	2 October 2012	End of the season	First team	

== Stats ==
=== Squad stats ===
				Total				Hong Kong First Division League		Senior Challenge Shield		FA Cup		AFC Cup Play-offs		AFC Cup		
N	Pos.	Name	Nat.	GS	App	Gls	Min	App	Gls	App	Gls	App	Gls	App	Gls	App	Gls	Notes
1	GK	Wang Zhenpeng	(Hong Kong)	23	23	-26	2049	14	-18	2	-1			1		6	-7	(−) GA
17	GK	Chan Ka Ho	(Hong Kong)															(−) GA
23	GK	Guo Jianqiao	(China)	11	12	-6	1011	5	-4			5	-2	1		1		(−) GA
2	CB	Fernando Recio	(Spain)	28	28		2201	14		2		4		2		6		
3	LB	Dani Cancela	(Spain)	14	17		1202	10		1		4		2				
5	CB	Zesh Rehman	(Pakistan)	29	30		2558	15		2		4		2		7		
12	RB	Lo Kwan Yee	(Hong Kong)	29	31	3	2540	16	2	2		5		2		6	1	
14	CB	Liu Quankun	(Hong Kong)	8	15	1	962	8	1	1		2				4		
16	CB	Tsang Chi Hau	(Hong Kong)	3	8		394	4				1				3		
20	LB	Cheung Kin Fung	(Hong Kong)	13	17		1216	5				3		2		7		joined in January 2013, conceded one goal in the league
21	RB	Tsang Kam To	(Hong Kong)	9	16	2	863	10	1			1		1		4	1	
24	LB	Landon Ling	(Canada)															on loan to Southern in September 2012
27	DF	Shay Spitz	(New Zealand)	6	7		602	6		1								joined in September 2012, left in March 2013
6	DM	Gao Wen	(Hong Kong)	9	14	1	740	9	1			1				4		
7	CM	Chu Siu Kei	(Hong Kong)	27	31	5	2468	15	4	2		5		2		7	1	
10	CM	Lam Ka Wai	(Hong Kong)	16	22	1	1468	10	1			4		2		6		
15	CM	Matt Lam	(Canada)	7	8	1	559	5				2		1	1			joined in February 2013
19	DM	Huang Yang	(Hong Kong)	31	31	3	2691	16	1	2		5	1	2	1	6		
22	RM	Lo Chi Kwan	(Hong Kong)	11	19	1	974	11	1	1		2				5		
25	CM	Ngan Lok Fung	(Hong Kong)		1		32	1										returned in January 2013
30	CM	So Chun Yin	(Hong Kong)															
	CM	Leung Ka Hai	(Hong Kong)															on loan to Sunray Cave JC Sun Hei in October 2012
	RM	James Ha	(Hong Kong)		2		37			2								on loan to Sunray Cave JC Sun Hei in January 2013
8	FW	Pablo Couñago	(Spain)	19	28	10	1780	13	7	2		5	1	1		7	2	joined in October 2012
11	FW	Yago González	(Spain)	18	25	8	1531	17	4	2		4	3	2	1			
13	FW	Chan Man Fai	(Hong Kong)	16	24	4	1347	11	3	2		4		2	1	5		
18	FW	Jordi Tarrés	(Spain)	24	28	19	2179	13	7	1		5		2	1	7	11	
28	FW	Cheng Siu Wai	(Hong Kong)	20	28	6	1800	14	3	2		4		1		7	3	
	FW	Jonathan Carril	(Spain)	1	4	3	190	4	3									on loan to Southern in October 2012
	FW	Liang Zicheng	(China)	1	7		216	6		1								on loan to Sunray Cave JC Sun Hei in January 2013

Last updated: 26 May 2013
Ordered by Position
0 shown as blank

=== Top scorers ===
As of 26 May 2013

Place	Position	Nationality	Number	Name	First Division League	Senior Challenge Shield	FA Cup	AFC Cup Play-offs	AFC Cup	Total
1	FW	(Spain)	18	Jordi Tarrés	7	0	0	1	11	19
2	FW	(Spain)	8	Pablo Couñago	7	0	1	0	2	10
3	FW	(Spain)	11	Yago González	4	0	3	1	0	8
4	FW	(Hong Kong)	28	Cheng Siu Wai	3	0	0	0	3	6
5	MF	(Hong Kong)	7	Chu Siu Kei	4	0	0	0	1	5
=6	DF	(Hong Kong)	12	Lo Kwan Yee	2	0	1	0	1	4
=6	FW	(Hong Kong)	13	Chan Man Fai	3	0	0	1	0	4
=8	MF	(Hong Kong)	19	Huang Yang	1	0	1	1	0	3
=8	FW	(Spain)		Jonathan Carril	3	0	0	0	0	3
9	DF	(Hong Kong)	21	Tsang Kam To	1	0	0	0	1	2
=11	MF	(Hong Kong)	6	Gao Wen	1	0	0	0	0	1
=11	MF	(Hong Kong)	10	Lam Ka Wai	1	0	0	0	0	1
=11	DF	(Hong Kong)	14	Liu Quankun	1	0	0	0	0	1
=11	MF	(Canada) (Hong Kong)	15	Matt Lam	0	0	0	1	0	1
=11	MF	(Hong Kong)	22	Lo Chi Kwan	1	0	0	0	0	1
Own Goals					0	0	0	0	1	1
TOTALS					39	0	4	5	20	68

=== Disciplinary record ===
As of 26 May 2013

Number	Nationality	Position	Name	First Division League		Senior Challenge Shield		FA Cup		AFC Cup Play-offs		AFC Cup		Total	
Number	Nationality	Position	Name	Booked	Sent off (straight red)	Booked	Sent off (straight red)	Booked	Sent off (straight red)	Booked	Sent off (straight red)	Booked	Sent off (straight red)	Booked	Sent off (straight red)
1	(Hong Kong) (China)	GK	Wang Zhenpeng	1	1	0	0	0	0	0	0	1	0	2	1
2	(Spain)	DF	Fernando Recio	1	0	1	0	0	0	1	0	1	0	4	0
3	(Spain)	DF	Dani Cancela	2	0	0	0	1	0	0	0	0	0	3	0
5	(Pakistan)	DF	Zesh Rehman	1	0	0	0	1	0	1	0	0	0	3	0
7	(Hong Kong)	MF	Chu Siu Kei	1	0	0	0	1	0	1	0	1	0	4	0
8	(Spain)	FW	Pablo Couñago	1	0	0	0	0	0	0	1	0	0	1	1
10	(Hong Kong)	MF	Lam Ka Wai	1	0	0	0	1	0	0	0	0	0	2	0
11	(Spain)	FW	Yago González	1	0	0	0	0	0	2	0	0	0	3	0
12	(Hong Kong)	DF	Lo Kwan Yee	3	0	1	0	1	0	0	0	2	0	7	0
13	(Hong Kong)	FW	Chan Man Fai	1	0	1	0	0	0	0	0	2	0	4	0
14	(China)	DF	Liu Quankun	3	0	0	1	1	0	0	0	0	0	4	1
15	(Canada)	MF	Matt Lam	0	0	0	0	1	0	0	0	0	0	1	0
16	(Hong Kong)	DF	Tsang Chi Hau	2	0	0	0	0	0	0	0	0	0	2	0
18	(Spain)	FW	Jordi Tarrés	0	0	1	0	0	0	0	0	0	0	1	0
19	(Hong Kong)	MF	Huang Yang	1	0	0	0	1	0	0	0	0	1	2	1
21	(Hong Kong)	DF	Tsang Kam To	1	0	0	0	1	0	0	0	0	0	2	0
22	(Hong Kong)	MF	Lo Chi Kwan	2	0	0	0	0	0	0	0	1	0	3	0
25	(Hong Kong)	MF	Ngan Lok Fung	1	0	0	0	0	0	0	0	0	0	1	0
27	(New Zealand)	DF	Shay Spitz	1	0	1	0	0	0	0	0	0	0	2	0
28	(Hong Kong)	FW	Cheng Siu Wai	2	0	2	0	0	0	0	0	0	0	4	0
TOTALS				26	1	7	1	9	0	5	1	8	1	55	4

== Competitions ==
=== Overall ===
Competition	Started round	Final position / round	First match	Last match
Hong Kong First Division League	—	2nd	2 September 2012	4 May 2013
Senior Challenge Shield	Quarter-finals	Quarter-finals	17 November 2012	25 November 2012
FA Cup	Quarter-finals	Winner	16 February 2013	11 May 2013
2013 AFC Cup	Group stage	Round of 16	26 February 2013	14 May 2013^{1}
Hong Kong AFC Cup play-offs	Semi-finals	Winner	19 May 2013	26 May 2013

Updated to match played 26 May 2013
Source: Competitions
^{1} Kitchee will continue their 2013 AFC Cup matches in the following season.

=== First Division League ===
==== Classification ====
Pos	Team	Pld	W	D	L	GF	GA	GD	Pts	Qualification or relegation
1	South China (C)	18	11	3	4	46	21	+25	36	2014 AFC Champions League play-off stage
2	Kitchee	18	9	5	4	39	23	+16	32	2014 AFC Cup (Note: Kitchee won the 2012–13 Hong Kong Season play-off and thus qualified for the 2014 AFC Cup Group stage.)
3	Tuen Mun	18	8	4	6	29	31	−2	28	2012–13 Hong Kong Season play-off (Note: Southern qualified for the play-offs as Kitchee defeated Sun Pegasus in the FA Cup while they have guaranteed a place for the play-offs, meaning the league 4th place qualifies.)
4	Southern	18	6	6	6	24	27	−3	24	2012–13 Hong Kong Season play-off
5	Sun Pegasus	18	4	9	5	35	29	+6	21	

Updated to match(es) played on 26 May 2013. Source:
Rules for classification: 1) points; 2) head-to-head points; 3) head-to-head goal difference; 4) head-to-head goals scored; 5) goal difference; 6) number of goals scored.
(C) Champions

==== Results summary ====
Overall								Home						Away					
Pld	W	D	L	GF	GA	GD	Pts	W	D	L	GF	GA	GD	W	D	L	GF	GA	GD
18	9	5	4	39	23	+16	32	3	4	2	18	16	+2	6	1	2	21	7	+14

Last updated: 4 May 2013.

==== Results by round ====
Round	1	2	3	4	5	6	7	8	9	10	11	12	13	14	15	16	17	18
Ground	A	H	H	A	A	H	H	A	A	H	H	A	A	H	H	H	A	A
Result	W	W	W	L	W	W	D	W	W	D	L	W	W	D	D	L	D	L
Position	2	1	1	2	2	1	1	2	2	2	2	2	2	2	2	2	2	2

Updated to match(es) played on 4 May 2013. Source:
A = Away; H = Home; W = Win; D = Draw; L = Loss

== Matches ==
=== Pre-season ===
16 July 2012	Army United (Thailand)	1 – 2	(Hong Kong) Kitchee	Thailand
	Goal	Report	James Ha; Chan Man Fai

18 July 2012	BEC Tero Sasana (Thailand)	2 – 2	(Hong Kong) Kitchee	Thailand
18:00(GMT+7)	55'; 90'		46' Jordi; 79' Liang Zicheng

29 July 2012	Kitchee (Hong Kong)	2 – 2	(England) Arsenal	So Kon Po, Hong Kong
17:00 HKT (10:00 BST)	Yago 8'; Dani 28'	Report(Arsenal); Report(HKFA)	24' Walcott; 77' Eisfeld; (yellow card) 80' Santos	Stadium: Hong Kong Stadium (Capacity: 40,000); Attendance: 39,209; Referee: Liu Kwok Man; Assistant referees: Cheng Oi Cho, Chan Shui Hung; Fourth official: Ng Chiu Kok

8 August 2012	Al Wasl (United Arab Emirates)	3 – 4	(Hong Kong) Kitchee	United Arab Emirates
22:00 (GMT+4)	56'; 80'; 82'		10', 47', 55' Jordi; 39' Yago

11 August 2012	Camarles (Spain)	0 – 5	(Hong Kong) Kitchee	Barcelona, Spain
20:00 (UTC+2)			Yago; Cheng Siu Wai; Carril; Dani

12 August 2012	Tarragona (Spain)	1 – 0	(Hong Kong) Kitchee	Tarragona, Catalonia, Spain
20:00 (UTC+2)	Goal

15 August 2012	Rapitenca (Spain)	3 – 0	(Hong Kong) Kitchee	Sant Carles, Catalonia, Spain
20:00 (UTC+2)	Goal		(yellow card) ?' (yellow-red card) 80' Liu Quankun

17 August 2012	Villarreal B (Spain)	0 – 2	(Hong Kong) Kitchee	Villarreal, Castellón, Spain
20:00 (UTC+2)			40' Cheng Siu Wai; 47' Jordi

=== Competitive ===
==== First Division League ====
2 September 2012 Week 1	Sunray Cave JC Sun Hei	0 – 3	Kitchee	Mong Kok, Kowloon
17:30(GMT+8)	Makhosonke (yellow card) 22'; Roberto (yellow card) 71'	Report	51', 88' Carril; 79' Chan Man Fai	Stadium: Mong Kok Stadium (Capatity:6,680); Attendance: 1,818; Referee: Ng Chiu Kok; Assistant referees: Chow Chun Kit, Chung Ming Sang; Fourth official: Ho Wai Sing

6 September 2012 Week 2	Kitchee	3 – 2	Citizen	Tseung Kwan O, New Territories
20:00 (GMT+8)	Cheng Siu Wai 59'; Lo Kwan Yee 66'; Lo Chi Kwan (yellow card) 85'; Carril 90' (pen.)	Report	4' Nakamura; (yellow card) 52' (goal) 83' Campion; (yellow card) 88' So Loi Keung; (yellow card) 90' Chiu Chun Kit; (yellow card) 90' Hélio	Stadium: Tseung Kwan O Sports Ground (Capatity:3,500); Attendance: 733; Referee: Wong Chi Tang, Charlton; Assistant referees: Liu Kwok Man, Chung Ming Sang; Fourth official: Lam Shing Yan, Franky

13 September 2012 Week 3	Kitchee	3 – 0	Southern	Tseung Kwan O, New Territories
20:00 (GMT+8)	Lam Ka Wai 17'; Cheng Siu Wai 76'; Tsang Kam To 87'	Report	(yellow card) 43' Fofo	Stadium: Tseung Kwan O Sports Ground (Capatity:3,500); Attendance: 601; Referee: Cheng Oi Cho; Assistant referees: Lam Chi Ho, Lam Nai Kei; Fourth official: Luk Kin Sun

29 September 2012 Week 4	South China	1 – 0	Kitchee	So Kon Po, Hong Kong Island
17:30 (GMT+8)	Leandro (yellow card) 5'; Ticão (yellow card) 45'; Dhiego Martins 90+8' (yellow card) 73' (yellow-red card) 90+8'; Tse (yellow card) 81'; Lee Wai Lim (yellow card) 90+9'	Report	(yellow card) 8' Lo Kwan Yee; (yellow card) 45' Chu Siu Kei; (yellow card) 90+1' Dani; (yellow card) 90+6' Lam Ka Wai	Stadium: Hong Kong Stadium (Capatity:40,000); Attendance: 4,249; Referee: Ng Chiu Kok; Assistant referees: Chow Chun Kit, Chung Ming Sang; Fourth official: Lam Shing Yan, Franky

7 October 2012 Week 5	Yokohama FC Hong Kong	1 – 4	Kitchee	Sham Shui Po, Kowloon
17:30 (GMT+8)	Law Chun Bong (red card) 14'; Lee Ka Ho (yellow card) 49' (yellow-red card) 58'; Yoshitake (yellow card) 58' (goal) 90'	Report	25', 35' Chu Siu Kei; 51', 77' Yago; (yellow card) 58' Cheng Siu Wai	Stadium: Sham Shui Po Sports Ground (Capatity:2,194); Attendance: 1,895; Referee: Ng Chiu Kok; Assistant referees: Cheng Oi Cho, Lam Chi Ho; Fourth official: Lau Fong Hei

21 October 2012 Week 6	Kitchee	4 – 2	Sun Pegasus	Tseung Kwan O, New Territories
17:30 (GMT+8)	Jordi 39', 66'; Couñago 64', 77'; Liu Quankun (yellow card) 82'	Report	(yellow card) 29' Mbome; (yellow card) 42' Li Jian; 57', 63' McKee; (yellow card) 88' Lee Wai Lun; (yellow card) 89' Chuck Yiu Kwok	Stadium: Tseung Kwan O Sports Ground (Capatity:3,500); Attendance: 850; Referee: Ng Chiu Kok; Assistant referees: Chow Chun Kit, Chung Ming Sang; Fourth official: Yu Chun San

27 October 2012 Week 8	Kitchee	1 – 1	Tuen Mun	Tseung Kwan O, New Territories
14:30 (GMT+8)	Spitz (yellow card) 10'; Jordi 24'; Lo Kwan Yee (yellow card) 90'	Report	(yellow card) 39' Kwok Wing Sun; 78' Yip Tsz Chun; (yellow card) 86' Daniel; (yellow card) 88' Mauricio; (yellow card) 90' Cheung Yiu Ting	Stadium: Tseung Kwan O Sports Ground (Capatity:3,500); Attendance: 849; Referee: Cheng Oi Cho; Assistant referees: Liu Kwok Man, Poon Ming Fai; Fourth official: Lam Shing Yan, Franky

4 November 2012 Week 7	Wofoo Tai Po	1 – 3	Kitchee	Tai Po, New Territories
14:30 (GMT+8)	Li Shu Yeung 60'; Jing Teng (red card) 88'	Report	5' (pen.), 45' Couñago; 90' Jordi	Stadium: Tai Po Sports Ground (Capatity:3,000); Attendance: 920; Referee: Tong Kui Sum; Assistant referees: Chow Chun Kit, Lam Nai Kei; Fourth official: Wong Yin Wai

23 December 2012 Week 9	Biu Chun Rangers	2 – 7	Kitchee	Mong Kok, Kowloon
17:30 (GMT+8)	Giovane 36'; Liu Songwei 56'	Report	3', 79' (pen.) Couñago; 13', 41' Jordi; 47' Cheng Siu Wai; 72' Liu Quankun; 86' Chu Siu Kei	Stadium: Mong Kok Stadium^{1} (Capacity: 6,680); Attendance: 2,643; Referee: Tong Kui Sum; Assistant referees: Lam Shing Yan, Poon Ming Fai; Fourth official: Cheng Oi Cho

20 January 2013 Week 10	Kitchee	2 – 2	Yokohama FC Hong Kong	Tseung Kwan O, New Territories
17:30 (GMT+8)	Jordi 2'; Recio (yellow card) 9'; Yago 82'	Report	22' (yellow card) 90+3' (yellow-red card) 90+6' Yoshitake; (yellow card) 40' Mirko; 54' Mijanović; (yellow card) 64' Chan Siu Kwan	Stadium: Tseung Kwan O Sports Ground (Capatity:3,500); Attendance: 759; Referee: Ng Chiu Kok; Assistant referees: Chung Ming Sang, Lam Shing Yan Franky; Fourth official: Chow Chun Kit

31 January 2013 Week 11	Kitchee	1 – 2	Biu Chun Rangers	Tseung Kwan O, New Territories
20:00 (GMT+8)	Chu Siu Kei 53'; Yago (yellow card) 59'; Tsang Chi Hau (yellow card) 67'	Report	(yellow card) 41' Juninho; 62' Giovane; 68' Saric	Stadium: Tseung Kwan O Sports Ground (Capatity:3,500); Attendance: 457; Referee: Cheng Oi Cho; Assistant referees: Chan Shui Hung, Chung Ming Sang; Fourth official: Lui Siu Chuen

24 February 2013 Week 12	Tuen Mun	0 – 2	Kitchee	Tuen Mun, New Territories
14:30 (GMT+8)	Diego (yellow card) 90+3'	Report	(yellow card) 15' Tsang Kam To; 36' Gao Wen; (yellow card) 66' Ngan Lok Fung; 90+4' Lo Chi Kwan	Stadium: Tuen Mun Tang Siu Kin Sports Ground (Capatity:2,200); Attendance: 943; Referee: Ho Wai Sing; Assistant referees: Chan Shui Hung, Poon Ming Fai; Fourth official: Yu Kin Fung

2 March 2013 Week 13	Southern	0 – 1	Kitchee	Aberdeen, Hong Kong Island
14:30 (GMT+8)		Report	(yellow card) 9' Dani; 27' Lo Kwan Yee; (yellow card) 89' Wang Zhenpeng	Stadium: Aberdeen Sports Ground (Capatity:4,000^{2}); Attendance: 546; Referee: Ho Wai Sing; Assistant referees: Lui Siu Chuen, Lam Chi Ho; Fourth official: Luk Kin Sun

17 March 2013 Week 14	Kitchee	2 – 2	Wofoo Tai Po	Tseung Kwan O, New Territories
17:30 (GMT+8)	Lo Kwan Yee (yellow card) 45+1'; Chan Man Fai 51', 53'; Huang Yang (yellow card) 85'	Report	60' To Hon To; (yellow card) 84' Clayton; 85' Annan	Stadium: Tseung Kwan O Sports Ground (Capatity:3,500); Attendance: 708; Referee: Tong Kui Sum; Assistant referees: Lui Siu Chuen, Yu Chun San; Fourth official: Fok Pong Shing

29 March 2013^{3} Week 15	Kitchee	1 – 1	Sunray Cave JC Sun Hei	Tseung Kwan O, New Territories
17:30 (GMT+8)	Couñago 64'	Report	32' Barry; (yellow card) 42' Leung Ka Hai	Stadium: Tseung Kwan O Sports Ground (Capatity:3,500); Attendance: 714; Referee: Tong Kui Sum; Assistant referees: Lam Shing Yan Franky, Lau Fong Hei; Fourth official: Chan Shui Hung

14 April 2013 Week 16	Kitchee	1 – 4	South China	Tseung Kwan O, New Territories
17:30 (GMT+8)	Chan Man Fai (yellow card) 31'; Rehman (yellow card) 43'; Liu Quankun (yellow card) 84'; Huang Yang 89'; Wang Zhenpeng (red card) 90+4'	Report	(yellow card) 28' Tse; 40' (pen.) Itaparica; (yellow card) 52' Chan Wai Ho; 73' Celin; 81' Lee Hong Lim; 90+7' Dhiego Martins	Stadium: Tseung Kwan O Sports Ground (Capatity:5,000^{4}); Attendance: 3,613; Referee: Ng Chiu Kok; Assistant referees: Tong Kui Sum, Lam Chi Ho; Fourth official: Lam Nai Kei

19 April 2013 Week 17	Sun Pegasus	1 – 1	Kitchee	Yuen Long, New Territories
20:00 (GMT+8)	Mbome (yellow card) 35'; Ho Kwok Chuen (yellow card) 45+2'; Deng Jinghuang 55' (yellow card) 64'	Report	6' (pen.) Yago; (yellow card) 76' Couñago; (yellow card) 83' Cheng Siu Wai	Stadium: Yuen Long Stadium (Capatity:4,932); Attendance: 595; Referee: Cheng Oi Cho; Assistant referees: Ng Chiu Kok, Yu Chun San; Fourth official: Chan Ming Siu

4 May 2013 Week 18	Citizen	1 – 0	Kitchee	Mong Kok, Kowloon
15:30 (GMT+8)	Festus 81'	Report	(yellow card) 8' Lo Chi Kwan; (yellow card) 59' Liu Quankun; (yellow card) 73' Tsang Chi Hau	Stadium: Mong Kok Stadium (Capatity:6,680); Attendance: 1,820; Referee: Tong Kui Sum; Assistant referees: Lam Nai Kei, Yau Ho Fai Leo; Fourth official: Chan Shui Hung

Remarks:
^{1} Biu Chun Rangers's home matches against Kitchee are played at Mong Kok Stadium instead of their usual home ground Sham Shui Po Sports Ground.
^{2} The capacity of Aberdeen Sports Ground is originally 9,000, but only the 4,000-seated main stand is opened for football match.
^{3} Home match against Sunray Cave JC Sun Hei was originally scheduled to be played on 31 March 2013 but was rescheduled to be played on 29 March 2013.
^{4} Since the 3,500-seated main stand was all full, the 1,500 temporary stand was opened and therefore the capacity of Tseung Kwan O Sports Ground was 5,000 in the home match against South China.

==== Senior Challenge Shield ====
===== Quarterfinals =====
17 November 2012 1st leg	South China	1 – 0	Kitchee	So Kon Po, Hong Kong Island
17:30(GMT+8)	Man Pei Tak (yellow card) 6'; Lee Chi Ho (yellow card) 54'; Itaparica 87'	Report	(yellow card) 12' Spitz; (yellow card) 26' Chan Man Fai; (yellow card) 32' (yellow-red card) 90+3' Liu Quankun; (yellow card) 68' Jordi Tarrés; (yellow card) 78' Recio; (yellow card) 81' Cheng Siu Wai	Stadium: Hong Kong Stadium (Capacity: 40,000); Attendance: 2,757; Referee: Cheng Oi Cho; Assistant referees: Chung Ming Sang, Poon Ming Fai; Fourth official: Tong Kui Sum

25 November 2012 2nd leg	Kitchee	0 – 0 (0 – 1 agg.)	South China	Tseung Kwan O, New Territories
17:30(GMT+8)	Lo Kwan Yee (yellow card) 17'; Cheng Siu Wai (yellow card) 63'	Report	(yellow card) 25' Mauro; (yellow card) 41' Kwok Kin Pong; (yellow card) 85' Itaparica; (yellow card) 90+4' Yapp Hung Fai	Stadium: Tseung Kwan O Sports Ground (Capacity: 3,500); Attendance: 1,782; Referee: Liu Kwok Man; Assistant referees: Chan Shui Hung, Lam Nai Kei; Fourth official: Ho Wai Sing

==== FA Cup ====
===== Quarter-finals =====
16 February 2013 1st leg	Kitchee	2 – 1	Biu Chun Rangers	Tseung Kwan O, New Territories
17:30(GMT+8)	Yago 44'; Lo Kwan Yee 90'	Report	45' Miroslav; (yellow card) 80' Luciano; (yellow card) 87' Bamnjo	Stadium: Tseung Kwan O Sports Ground (Capacity: 3,500); Attendance: 560; Referee: Ng Chiu Kok; Assistant referees: Chan Shui Hung, Lui Siu Chuen; Fourth official: Lam Chi Ho

9 March 2013 2nd leg	Biu Chun Rangers	0 – 0 (1 – 2 agg.)	Kitchee	Sham Shui Po, Kowloon
14:30(GMT+8)	Bamnjo (yellow card) 36'	Report	(yellow card) 16' Tsang Kam To	Stadium: Sham Shui Po Sports Ground (Capacity: 2,194); Attendance: 669; Referee: Ng Kai Lam; Assistant referees: Chow Chun Kit, Lam Nai Kei; Fourth official: Chan Shui Hung

===== Semi-finals =====
7 April 2012 1st leg	Kitchee	1 – 1	South China	Tseung Kwan O, New Territories
18:00(GMT+8)	Liu Quankun (yellow card) 47'; Huang Yang 55'; Dani (yellow card) 61'; Matt Lam (yellow card) 75'; Lo Kwan Yee (yellow card) 90'	Report	12' Cheng Lai Hin; (yellow card) 54' Man Pei Tak; (yellow card) 79' Kwok Kin Pong	Stadium: Tseung Kwan O Sports Ground (Capacity: 3,500); Attendance: 1,627; Referee: Tong Kui Sum; Assistant referees: Chan Shui Hung, Lui Siu Chuen; Fourth official: Luk Kin Sun

28 April 2013 2nd leg	South China	0 – 2 (1 – 3 agg.)	Kitchee	So Kon Po, Hong Kong Island
18:00(GMT+8)	Ticão (yellow card) 16'; Cheng Lai Hin (yellow card) 38'; Joel (yellow card) 75'; Dhiego (yellow card) 79'	Report	(yellow card) 23' Huang Yang; (yellow card) 49' Lam Ka Wai; 73', 76' Yago; (yellow card) 79' Rehman	Stadium: Hong Kong Stadium (Capacity: 40,000); Attendance: 3,005; Referee: Liu Kwok Man; Assistant referees: Lam Chi Ho, Poon Ming Fai; Fourth official: Lui Siu Chuen

===== Final =====
11 May 2013	Sun Pegasus	0 – 1	Kitchee	So Kon Po, Hong Kong Island
18:00(GMT+8)	Miović (yellow card) 24'; Cesar (yellow card) 90+1'	Report	(yellow card) 39' Chu Siu Kei; 57' Couñago	Stadium: Hong Kong Stadium (Capacity: 40,000); Attendance: 2,963; Referee: Cheng Oi Cho; Assistant referees: Chow Chun Kit, Chan Shui Hung; Fourth official: Tong Kui Sum; Man of the Match: Couñago (Kitchee)

==== Hong Kong AFC Cup play-offs ====
19 May 2013 Semi-finals	Kitchee	2 – 0	Southern	Mong Kok, Kowloon
16:00 (GMT+8)	Yago 7' (yellow card) 28'; Matt Lam 81'	Report	(yellow card) 71' Tse Man Wing; (yellow card) 73' Ip Chung Long	Stadium: Mong Kok Stadium (Capatity:6,680); Attendance: 1,255; Referee: Ho Wai Sing; Assistant referees: Chow Chun Kit, Yu Chun San; Fourth official: Luk Kin Sun

26 May 2013 Final	Kitchee	3 – 0	Tuen Mun	Mong Kok, Kowloon
16:00 (GMT+8)	Chu Siu Kei (yellow card) 20'; Recio (yellow card) 27'; Jordi 59'; Huang Yang 67'; Chan Man Fai 79'; Couñago (red card) 84'; Yago (yellow card) 85'; Rehman (yellow card) 89'	Report	(yellow card) 18' Kwok Wing Sun; (yellow card) 37' Diego; (yellow card) 65' Daniel; (yellow card) 84' Law Ka Lok; (yellow card) 86' Beto; (red card) 90' Li Haiqiang	Stadium: Mong Kok Stadium (Capatity:6,680); Attendance: 1,576; Referee: Ng Chiu Kok; Assistant referees: Chung Ming Sang, Lam Nai Kei; Fourth official: Cheng Oi Cho

==== AFC Cup ====
===== Group stage =====
Team	Pld	W	D	L	GF	GA	GD	Pts
(Indonesia) Semen Padang	6	5	1	0	15	6	+9	16
(Hong Kong) Kitchee	6	4	0	2	18	7	+11	12
(India) Churchill Brothers	6	1	1	4	6	13	−7	4
(Singapore) Warriors	6	1	0	5	4	17	−13	3

26 February 2013 Matchday 1	Kitchee (Hong Kong)	3 – 0	(India) Churchill Brothers	Mong Kok, Kowloon
20:00 (GMT+8)	Huang Yang (yellow card) 19' (yellow-red card) 56'; Chu Siu Kei 28'; Jordi 31', 66'; Lo Kwan Yee (yellow card) 60'	Report (AFC); Report (HKFA)	(yellow card) 18' Tamba	Stadium: Mong Kok Stadium (Capacity: 6,680); Attendance: 1,851; Referee: Chris Beath (Australia); Assistant referees: Nathan MacDonald (Australia), Azman Bin Ismail (Malaysia; Fourth official: Jarred Gillett (Australia)

12 March 2013 Matchday 2	Warriors (Singapore)	2 – 4	(Hong Kong) Kitchee	Jalan Besar, Singapore
20:00 (GMT+8)	Inui 23'; Gunawan 29'; Shi Jiayi (yellow card) 45'	Report	46', 51' Jordi; 62' Lo Kwan Yee; 75' Cheng Siu Wai	Stadium: Jalan Besar Stadium (Capacity: 8,000); Attendance: 1,151; Referee: Minoru Tōjō (Japan); Assistant referees: Yagi Akane (Japan), Karakami Satoshi (Japan); Fourth official: Dinh Van Dung (Vietnam)

2 April 2013 Matchday 3	Kitchee (Hong Kong)	1 – 2	(Indonesia) Semen Padang	Mong Kok, Kowloon
20:00 (GMT+8)	Jordi 83'	Report	4' (yellow card) 18' Iskandar; 77' Wilson; (yellow card) 86' Vizcarra	Stadium: Mong Kok Stadium (Capacity: 6,680); Attendance: 1,792; Referee: Sgt. Win Cho (Myanmer); Assistant referees: Aung Moe (Myanmer), Han Thein (Myanmer); Fourth official: Tin Htut (Myanmer)

10 April 2013 Matchday 4	Semen Padang (Indonesia)	3 – 1	(Hong Kong) Kitchee	Padang, Indonesia
15:00 (GMT+7)	Wilson 13', 75'; Yu Hyun-Koo (yellow card) 46'; Nur Iskandar 71'	Report	33' Jordi; (yellow card) 75' Recio	Stadium: Haji Agus Salim Stadium (Capacity: 28,000); Attendance: 11,315; Referee: Mohd Amirul Izwan bin Yaacob (Malaysia); Assistant referees: Azman Bin Ismail (Malaysia), Mohd Kamil bin Tumin (Malaysia); Fourth official: Suhaizi Shukri (Malaysia)

24 April 2013 Matchday 5	Churchill Brothers (India)	0 – 4	(Hong Kong) Kitchee	Pune, India
15:00 (GMT+5:30)	Revanan (yellow card) 76'; Antchouet (yellow card) 90+2'	Report	15', 17' Couñago; (yellow card) 37' Lo Kwan Yee; (yellow card) 54' Wang Zhenpeng; 57' Jordi; 81' Cheng Siu Wai	Stadium: Shree Shiv Chhatrapati Sports Complex (Capacity: 22,000); Attendance: 400; Referee: Vo Minh Tri (Vietnam); Assistant referees: Palitha Hemathunga (Sri Lanka), Alahapperuma Pathmasiri Dias (Sri Lanka); Fourth official: Dinh Van Dung (Vietnam)

1 May 2013 Matchday 6	Kitchee (Hong Kong)	5 – 0	(Singapore) Warriors	Mong Kok, Kowloon
17:00 (GMT+8)	Jordi 18', 53', 88'; Cheng Siu Wai 62'; Lo Chi Kwan (yellow card) 68'; Tsang Kam To 72'; Chu Siu Kei (yellow card) 87'	Report (AFC); Report (HKFA)	(yellow card) 20' Mutalib; (yellow card) 21' Abidin	Stadium: Mong Kok Stadium (Capacity: 6,680); Attendance: 1,097; Referee: Ko Hyung-Jin (Korea Republic); Assistant referees: Jang Jun-Mo (Korea Republic), Lee Jung-Min (Korea Republic); Fourth official: Kim Dae-Yong (Korea Republic)

===== Round of 16 =====
14 May 2013	Kelantan (Malaysia)	0 – 2	(Hong Kong) Kitchee	Kota Bharu, Malaysia
20:45 (GMT+8)	Shaari (yellow card) 45'; Petratos (yellow card) 76'	Report	15' (o.g.) Kcira; 45+1' Jordi; (yellow card) 90+1' Chan Man Fai	Stadium: Sultan Mohammad IV Stadium (Capacity: 25,000); Attendance: 15,000; Referee: Lee Min-Hu (Korea Republic); Assistant referees: Jang Jun-Mo (Korea Republic), Lee Jung-Min (Korea Republic); Fourth official: Perera Hettikamkanamge (Sri Lanka)

=== Other competitions ===
==== Hong Kong–Shanghai Inter Club Championship ====
1 November 2012 1st leg	Kitchee (Hong Kong)	0 – 4	(China) Shanghai Tellace	Tseung Kwan O, Hong Kong
20:00(GMT+8)	Rehman (yellow card) 52'; Lo Chi Kwan (yellow card) 88'; Tsang Kam To (yellow card) 90'	Report	28', 35', 51' Mao Jiakang; (yellow card) 63' Li Yunqiu; 73' Geng Jiaqi; (yellow card) 83' Sun Jungang	Stadium: Tseung Kwan O Sports Ground (Capatity:6,680); Attendance: 737; Referee: Tong Kui Sum (Hong Kong)

10 November 2012 2nd leg	Shanghai Tellace (China)	3 – 2 (7 – 2 agg.)	(Hong Kong) Kitchee	Shanghai, China
15:00(GMT+8)	Wu Lei 8'; Geng Jiaqi 61'; Lin Chuangyi 69'		45' Chan Man Fai; 89' Couñago	Stadium: Yuanshen Sports Centre Stadium (Capatity:20,000)
