= 2012–13 Hong Kong FA Cup =

2012-13 Hong Kong FA Cup
Tournament details
- Country: Hong Kong
- Teams: 10

Final positions
- Champions: Kitchee (2nd title)
- Runners-up: Sun Pegasus

Tournament statistics
- Matches played: 17
- Goals scored: 43 (2.53 per match)
- Attendance: 19,503 (1,147 per match)
- Top goal scorer(s): Christian Annan (Wofoo Tai Po) (6 goals)

Awards
- Best player: Pablo Couñago (Kitchee)

The 2012–13 Hong Kong FA Cup was the 39th season of Hong Kong FA Cup. It was a knockout competition for all the teams of the 2012–13 Hong Kong First Division League. Starting from this season, the format changed into a two-legged home-and-away ties competition. The winner guaranteed a place in the 2013 Hong Kong AFC Cup play-offs.

== Calendar ==
Stage	Round	Date of First Round	Date of Second Round
Knockout	Round 1	26 December 2012	12 – 13 January 2013
Knockout	Quarter-final	16 – 17 February 2013	9 – 10 March 2013
Knockout	Semi-final	6 – 7 April 2013	27 – 28 April 2013
Knockout	Final	11 May 2013 at Hong Kong Stadium	

== Bracket ==
The following bracket doesn't show first round matches.

Quarterfinals
1	Sun Pegasus	3	3	6
8	Tuen Mun	2	1	3
4	Yokohama FC Hong Kong	0	1	1
5	Wofoo Tai Po	0	3	3
2	Kitchee	2	0	2
7	Biu Chun Rangers	1	0	1
3	Sunray Cave JC Sun Hei	0	0	0
6	South China	3	3	6

Semifinals
Sun Pegasus	1	1	2
Wofoo Tai Po	0	0	0
Kitchee	1	2	3
South China	1	0	1

Finals
Sun Pegasus
Kitchee

== Fixtures and results ==
=== First round ===
26 December 2012 1st leg	Wofoo Tai Po	3 – 0	Southern	Kowloon Bay, Kowloon
17:30 (GMT+8)	Annan 28', 60', 66'	Report	(yellow card) 49' Chan Ming Kong; (yellow card) 90' Cheng Chi Wing	Stadium: Kowloon Bay Park (Capacity: 1,200); Attendance: 273; Referee: Tong Kui Sum; Assistant referees: Lam Chi Ho, Yu Kin Fung; Fourth official: Yu Chun San

12 January 2013 2nd leg	Southern	2 – 1 (2 – 4 agg.)	Wofoo Tai Po	Aberdeen, Hong Kong Island
14:30 (GMT+8)	Carril 14' (pen.) (yellow card) 70'; Lander (yellow card) 24'; Chan Cheuk Kwong (yellow card) 34'; Cheng Chi Ying (yellow card) 41'; Landon 55'	Report	7' Annan	Stadium: Aberdeen Sports Ground (Capacity: 4,000^{1}); Attendance: 325; Referee: Ng Chiu Kok; Assistant referees: Ho Wai Sing, Chan Ming Siu; Fourth official: Yu Chun San

26 December 2012 1st leg	Citizen	0 – 2	South China	Mong Kok, Kowloon
14:30 (GMT+8)	Chiu Chun Kit (yellow card) 12' (yellow-red card) 77'; Paulinho (yellow card) 45+2'; Hélio (yellow card) 66'; Campion (yellow card) 67'; Wong Yiu Fu (yellow card) 87'	Report	(yellow card) 6' Joel; (yellow card) 45+2' Yapp Hung Fai; (yellow card) 51' (goal) 56' Dhiego; 81' Au Yeung Yiu Chung	Stadium: Mong Kok Stadium (Capacity: 6,680); Attendance: 2,292; Referee: Ng Kai Lam; Assistant referees: Ho Wai Sing, Chung Ming Sang; Fourth official: Chan Ming Siu

13 January 2013 2nd leg	South China	5 – 1 (7 – 1 agg.)	Citizen	So Kon Po, Hong Kong Island
14:30 (GMT+8)	Au Yeung Yiu Chung 17', 45'; Celin 48'; Luk Chi Ho 77'; Kwok Kin Pong (yellow card) 83'; Mauro 90+1'	Report	(yellow card) 47' Henry; 72' (pen.) Sandro	Stadium: Hong Kong Stadium (Capacity: 40,000); Attendance: 1,902; Referee: Tong Kui Sum; Assistant referees: Lam Chi Ho, Poon Ming Fai; Fourth official: Cheng Oi Cho

=== Quarter-finals ===
16 February 2013 1st leg	Tuen Mun	2 – 3	Sun Pegasus	Tuen Mun, New Territories
14:30(GMT+8)	Kwok Wing Sun (yellow card) 14' (yellow-red card) 42'; Daniel 24'; Diego 88'	Report	10' McKee; 15' (yellow card) 25' Miović; (yellow card) 20' (yellow-red card) 59' Cesar; 90+7' Lee Wai Lun	Stadium: Tuen Mun Tang Shiu Kin Sports Ground (Capacity: 2,200); Attendance: 722; Referee: Ng Kai Lam; Assistant referees: Ho Wai Sing, Yu Chun San; Fourth official: Lam Nai Kei

10 March 2013 2nd leg	Sun Pegasus	3 – 1 (6 – 3 agg.)	Tuen Mun	Yuen Long, New Territories
17:30(GMT+8)	Ju Yingzhi 38'; McKee 73'; Karalić 82'	Report	52' (yellow card) 69' Beto	Stadium: Yuen Long Stadium (Capacity: 4,932); Attendance: 536; Referee: Ng Chiu Kok; Assistant referees: Lui Siu Chuen, Yu Chun San; Fourth official: Luk Kin Sun

16 February 2013 1st leg	Kitchee	2 – 1	Biu Chun Rangers	Tseung Kwan O, New Territories
17:30(GMT+8)	Yago 44'; Lo Kwan Yee 90'	Report	45' Miroslav; (yellow card) 80' Luciano; (yellow card) 87' Bamnjo	Stadium: Tseung Kwan O Sports Ground (Capacity: 3,500); Attendance: 560; Referee: Ng Chiu Kok; Assistant referees: Chan Shui Hung, Lui Siu Chuen; Fourth official: Lam Chi Ho

9 March 2013 2nd leg	Biu Chun Rangers	0 – 0 (1 – 2 agg.)	Kitchee	Sham Shui Po, Kowloon
14:30(GMT+8)	Bamnjo (yellow card) 36'	Report	(yellow card) 16' Tsang Kam To	Stadium: Sham Shui Po Sports Ground (Capacity: 2,194); Attendance: 669; Referee: Ng Kai Lam; Assistant referees: Chow Chun Kit, Lam Nai Kei; Fourth official: Chan Shui Hung

17 February 2013 1st leg	Wofoo Tai Po	0 – 0	Yokohama FC Hong Kong	Tai Po, New Territories
14:30(GMT+8)	Ye Jia (yellow card) 58'	Report	(yellow card) 58' Lau Cheuk Hin; (yellow card) 82' Mirko; (yellow card) 90' Leung Kwun Chung	Stadium: Tai Po Sports Ground (Capacity: 3,000); Attendance: 497; Referee: Liu Kwok Man; Assistant referees: Chow Chun Kit, Yau Ho Fai Leo; Fourth official: Lam Shing Yan

10 March 2013 2nd leg	Yokohama FC Hong Kong	1 – 3 (1 – 3 agg.)	Wofoo Tai Po	Siu Sai Wan, Hong Kong Island
14:30(GMT+8)	Lam Ngai Tong (yellow card) 84'; Fong Pak Lun (yellow card) 90+2'; Clayton 90+3' (o.g.)	Report	(yellow card) 42' Lui Chi Hing; 50' Alex; 74', 88' Annan	Stadium: Siu Sai Wan Sports Ground (Capacity: 12,000); Attendance: 447; Referee: Ho Wai Sing; Assistant referees: Chan Shui Hung, Poon Ming Fai; Fourth official: Chow Chun Kit

17 February 2013 1st leg	South China	3 – 0	Sunray Cave JC Sun Hei	So Kon Po, Hong Kong Island
17:30(GMT+8)	Au Yeung Yiu Chung 73'; Chak Ting Fung (yellow card) 78'; Ticão 89'; Itaparica 90'	Report	(yellow card) 35' Díaz; (yellow card) 48' Kilama	Stadium: Hong Kong Stadium (Capacity: 40,000); Attendance: 1,329; Referee: Cheng Oi Cho; Assistant referees: Lam Chi Ho, Poon Ming Fai; Fourth official: Luk Kin Sun

9 March 2013 2nd leg	Sunray Cave JC Sun Hei	0 – 3 (0 – 6 agg.)	South China	Mong Kok, Kowloon
17:30(GMT+8)	Wong Chun Ho (yellow card) 8'	Report	5' Tse; 85' Lee Hong Lim; 90+1' Cheng Lai Hin	Stadium: Mong Kok Stadium (Capacity: 6,680); Attendance: 1,406; Referee: Tong Kui Sum; Assistant referees: Cheng Oi Cho, Lam Chi Ho; Fourth official: Tang Hing Fu

=== Semi-finals ===
6 April 2013 1st leg	Sun Pegasus	1 – 0	Wofoo Tai Po	Yuen Long, New Territories
17:30(GMT+8)	Tong Kin Man (yellow card) 29'; Lo Chun Kit (yellow card) 70'; Xu Deshuai 77'	Report	(yellow card) 90+3' Aender; (yellow card) 90+5' Chan Sze Wing	Stadium: Yuen Long Stadium (Capacity: 4,932); Attendance: 606; Referee: Liu Kwok Man; Assistant referees: Ng Chiu Kok, Lam Nai Kei; Fourth official: Yu Chun San

27 April 2013 2nd leg	Wofoo Tai Po	0 – 1 (0 – 2 agg.)	Sun Pegasus	Tai Po, New Territories
14:30(GMT+8)	Alex (yellow card) 31'; Clayton (yellow card) 63'	Report	35' (yellow card) 68' Chan Pak Hang; (yellow card) 57' Tong Kin Man; (yellow card) 70' Fung Kai Hong; (yellow card) 72' Miović	Stadium: Tai Po Sports Ground (Capacity: 3,000); Attendance: 904; Referee: Tong Kui Sum; Assistant referees: Ho Wai Sing, Chan Shui Hung; Fourth official: Luk Kin Sun

7 April 2012 1st leg	Kitchee	1 – 1	South China	Tseung Kwan O, New Territories
18:00(GMT+8)	Liu Quankun (yellow card) 47'; Huang Yang 55'; Dani (yellow card) 61'; Matt Lam (yellow card) 75'; Lo Kwan Yee (yellow card) 90'	Report	12' Cheng Lai Hin; (yellow card) 54' Man Pei Tak; (yellow card) 79' Kwok Kin Pong	Stadium: Tseung Kwan O Sports Ground (Capacity: 3,500); Attendance: 1,627; Referee: Tong Kui Sum; Assistant referees: Chan Shui Hung, Lui Siu Chuen; Fourth official: Luk Kin Sun

28 April 2013 2nd leg	South China	0 – 2 (1 – 3 agg.)	Kitchee	So Kon Po, Hong Kong Island
18:00(GMT+8)	Ticão (yellow card) 16'; Cheng Lai Hin (yellow card) 38'; Joel (yellow card) 75'; Dhiego (yellow card) 79'	Report	(yellow card) 23' Huang Yang; (yellow card) 49' Lam Ka Wai; 73', 76' Yago; (yellow card) 79' Rehman	Stadium: Hong Kong Stadium (Capacity: 40,000); Attendance: 3,005; Referee: Liu Kwok Man; Assistant referees: Lam Chi Ho, Poon Ming Fai; Fourth official: Lui Siu Chuen

=== Final ===
11 May 2013 Final	Sun Pegasus	0 – 1	Kitchee	So Kon Po, Hong Kong Island
18:00(GMT+8)		Report	57' Couñago	Stadium: Hong Kong Stadium (Capacity:40,000); Attendance: 2,963; Referee: Cheng Oi Cho; Man of the Match: Couñago (Kitchee)

Sun Pegasus	Kitchee

SUN PEGASUS:
GK	16	(Hong Kong) Ho Kwok Chuen^{LP}
LB	4	(Hong Kong) Deng Jinghuang^{LP}
CB	20	(Serbia) Igor Miović^{FP}	(yellow card) 24'
CB	5	(Brazil) Paulo Cesar^{FP}	(yellow card) 90+1'
RB	21	(Hong Kong) Tong Kin Man^{LP}
DM	10	(Cameroon) Eugene Mbome^{FP}
DM	18	(Hong Kong) Bai He^{LP}		(substituted off) 66'
RM	8	(Hong Kong) Xu Deshuai^{LP}
AM	24	(Hong Kong) Ju Yingzhi^{LP}		(substituted off) 85'
LM	17	(Hong Kong) Chan Pak Hang^{LP}		(substituted off) 87'
ST	23	(Hong Kong) Jaimes McKee^{LP} (c)
Substitutes:
GK	19	(China) Li Jian^{LP}
DF	2	(Hong Kong) Lee Wai Lun^{LP}		(substituted on) 87'
DF	13	(Hong Kong) Li Ngai Hoi^{LP}
DF	33	(Hong Kong) So Wai Chuen^{LP}
MF	28	(Hong Kong) Lo Chun Kit^{LP}		(substituted on) 85'
FW	9	(South Korea) Kim Dong-Ryeol^{FP}
FW	11	(Bosnia and Herzegovina) Vladimir Karalić^{FP}		(substituted on) 66'
Coach:
(Hong Kong) Chan Chi Hong

KITCHEE:
GK	23	(China) Guo Jianqiao^{LP}
RB	12	(Hong Kong) Lo Kwan Yee^{LP}
CB	2	(Spain) Fernando Recio^{FP}
CB	5	(Pakistan) Zesh Rehman^{FP}
LB	20	(Hong Kong) Cheung Kin Fung^{LP}
DM	19	(Hong Kong) Huang Yang^{LP}
CM	7	(Hong Kong) Chu Siu Kei^{LP} (c)	(yellow card) 39'	(substituted off) 71'
CM	10	(Hong Kong) Lam Ka Wai^{LP}
RW	18	(Spain) Jordi Tarrés^{FP}
LW	13	(Hong Kong) Chan Man Fai^{LP}		(substituted off) 63'
CF	8	(Spain) Pablo Couñago^{FP}		(substituted off) 65'
Substitutes:
GK	1	(Hong Kong) Wang Zhenpeng^{LP}
DF	3	(Spain) Dani Cancela^{FP}
DF	14	(Hong Kong) Liu Quankun^{LP}
DF	21	(Hong Kong) Tsang Kam To^{LP}
MF	6	(Hong Kong) Gao Wen^{LP}		(substituted on) 71'
FW	11	(Spain) Yago González^{FP}		(substituted on) 65'
FW	28	(Hong Kong) Cheng Siu Wai^{LP}		(substituted on) 63'
Coach:
(Spain) Josep Gombau

MATCH OFFICIALS

- Assistant referees:
  - Chow Chun Kit
  - Chan Shui Hung
- Fourth official: Tong Kui Sum
- ^{LP} Local Player
- ^{FP} Foreign Player

MATCH RULES

- 90 minutes. (1st Half Added Time: 2 mins, 2nd Half Added Time: 6 mins)
- 30 minutes of extra-time if necessary.
- Penalty shoot-out if scores still level.
- Seven named substitutes
- Maximum of 3 substitutions.

Remarks:
^{1} The capacity of Aberdeen Sports Ground is originally 9,000, but only the 4,000-seated main stand is opened for football match.

== Scorers ==
The scorers in the 2012–13 Hong Kong FA Cup are as follows:

6 goals

- (Ghana) Christian Annan (Wofoo Tai Po)

4 goals

- (Hong Kong) Au Yeung Yiu Chung (South China)

3 goals

- (Spain) Yago González (Kitchee)

2 goals

- (Hong Kong) Cheng Lai Hin (South China)
- (Hong Kong) Jaimes McKee (Sun Pegasus)

1 goal

- (Croatia) Miroslav Saric (Biu Chun Rangers)
- (Brazil) Sandro (Citizen)
- (Hong Kong) Huang Yang (Kitchee)
- (Spain) Pablo Couñago (Kitchee)
- (Hong Kong) Lo Kwan Yee (Kitchee)
- (Brazil) Alessandro Celin (South China)
- (Brazil) Dhiego de Souza Martins (South China)
- (Brazil) Itaparica (South China)
- (Hong Kong) Lee Hong Lim (South China)
- (Brazil) Mauro Rafael da Silva (South China)
- (Hong Kong) Luk Michael Chi Ho (South China)
- (Hong Kong) Sean Tse (South China)
- (Brazil) Ticão (South China)
- (Spain) Jonathan Carril (Southern)
- (Canada) Landon Lloyd Ling (Southern)
- (Hong Kong) Chan Pak Hang (Sun Pegasus)
- (Serbia) Igor Miović (Sun Pegasus)
- (Hong Kong) Ju Yingzhi (Sun Pegasus)
- (Hong Kong) Lee Wai Lun (Sun Pegasus)
- (Hong Kong) Xu Deshuai (Sun Pegasus)
- (Bosnia and Herzegovina) Vladimir Karalić (Sun Pegasus)
- (Brazil) Beto (Tuen Mun)
- (Brazil) Daniel Goulart Quevedo (Tuen Mun)
- (Brazil) Diego Eli Moreira (Tuen Mun)
- (Nigeria) Alex Tayo Akande (Wofoo Tai Po)

=== Own goals ===
1 goal

- (Brazil) Clayton Michel Afonso (Wofoo Tai Po)

== Prizes ==
Top Scorer	Man of the Final
(Ghana) Christian Annan	(Spain) Pablo Couñago
