= Ngan Lok Fung =

Hong Kong footballer

Ngan Lok Fung 顏樂楓
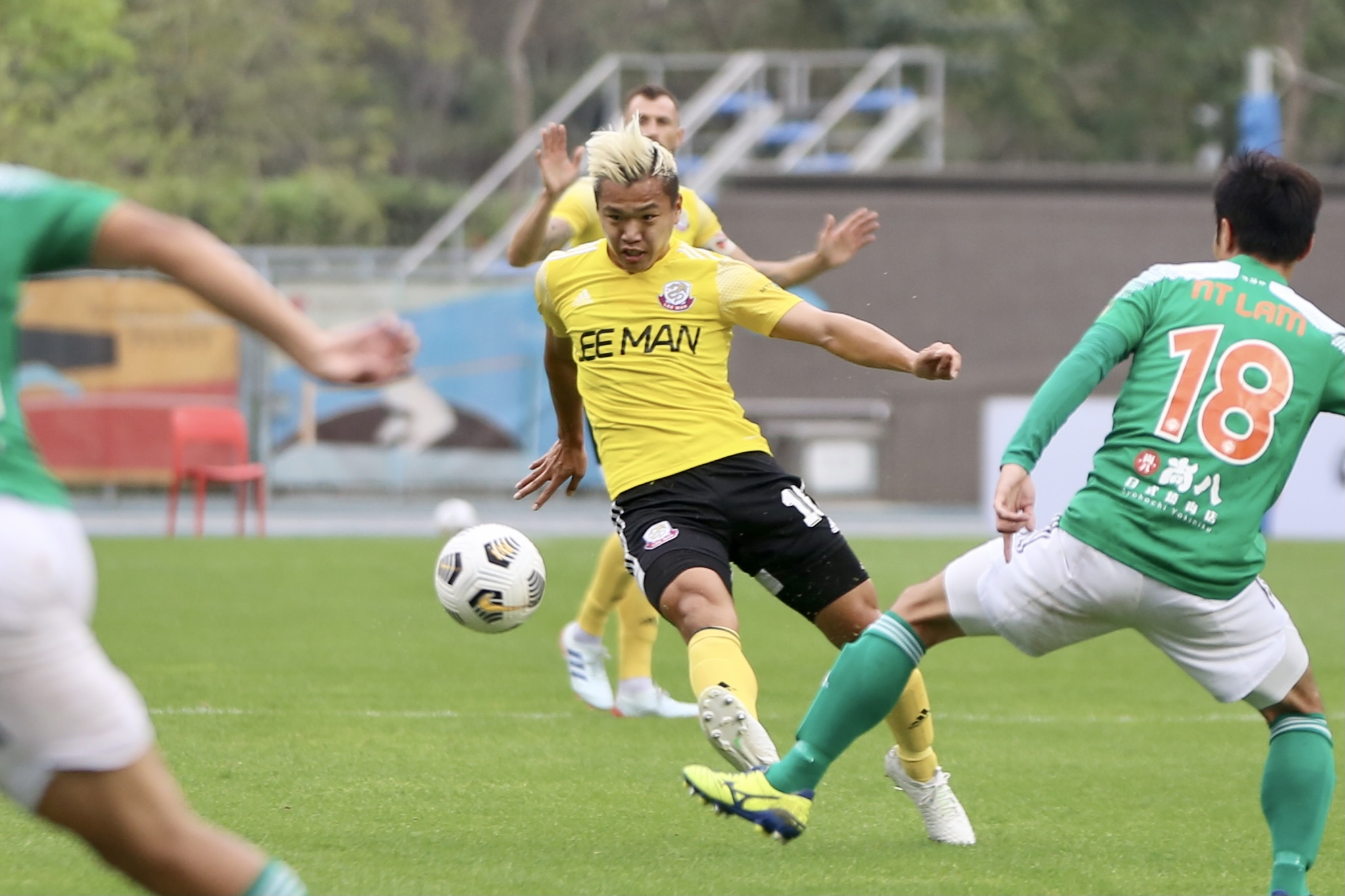

Personal information
- Full name: Ngan Lok Fung
- Date of birth: 26 January 1993 (age 33)
- Place of birth: Hong Kong
- Height: 1.75 m (5 ft 9 in)
- Position: Central midfielder

Team information
- Current team: Lee Man
- Number: 16

Youth career
- 2006–2011: Kitchee

Senior career*
Years	Team	Apps	(Gls)
2011–2018	Kitchee	9	(0)
2012	→ Pegasus (loan)	2	(0)
2013–2014	→ Southern (loan)	14	(0)
2016–2017	→ Yuen Long (loan)	17	(1)
2017–2018	→ Lee Man (loan)	12	(1)
2018–	Lee Man	119	(5)

International career^{‡}
2012	Hong Kong U-20	1	(0)
2011–2014	Hong Kong U-23	12	(0)
2013–2022	Hong Kong	6	(0)
- * Club domestic league appearances and goals as of 20 November 2026 ‡ National team caps and goals as of 24 September 2022

Ngan Lok Fung (Chinese: 顏樂楓; Jyutping: ngaan^{4} lok^{6} fung^{1}; born 26 January 1993) is a Hong Kong professional footballer who currently plays as a central midfielder for Hong Kong Premier League club Lee Man.

== Club career ==
Ngan joined Kitchee's youth team when he was 13 years old. He helped the team to win the Nike Premier Cup U-15 section, as well as being named the Most Valuable Player of the tournament. Since then, he featured in some reserves match for Kitchee as a youth team player. He was promoted to the first team before the start of 2011–12 season. On 3 September 2011, he featured in the first match of the season as a starter. However, he was substituted after the first half. He was loaned to Pegasus to gain experience in July 2012 until the end of the year. During the loan spell, he featured in two league games for Pegasus. On 17 June 2013, he joined fellow First Division club Southern on a season-long loan.

On 17 July 2017, it was revealed that Lee Man had acquired Ngan on loan for the 2017–18 season. His contract expired at the end of the season and he was not retained by Kitchee.

On 17 July 2018, Lee Man reacquired the services of Ngan for the upcoming 2018–19 season.

== International career ==
On 10 September 2013, Ngan made his international debut for Hong Kong in a friendly match against Singapore.

== Personal life ==
Ngan graduated from the Chinese University of Hong Kong in 2017 with a degree in sports science.

== Career statistics ==
=== Club ===
As of 23 February 2013

Club	Season	Division	League		Senior Shield		League Cup		FA Cup		AFC Cup		Total	
Club	Season	Division	Apps	Goals	Apps	Goals	Apps	Goals	Apps	Goals	Apps	Goals	Apps	Goals
Kitchee	2011–12	First Division	2	0	0	0	1	0	0	0	0	0	3	0
Pegasus (loan)	2012–13	First Division	2	0	0	0	—	—	0	0	N/A	N/A	2	0
Sun Pegasus Total			2	0	0	0	0	0	0	0	0	0	2	0
Kitchee	2012–13	First Division	1	0	0	0	—	—	0	0	0	0	1	0
Kitchee Total			3	0	0	0	1	0	0	0	0	0	4	0
Total			5	0	0	0	1	0	0	0	0	0	6	0

=== International ===
As of 24 September 2022

National team	Year	Apps	Goals
Hong Kong	2013	1	0
Hong Kong	2014	0	0
Hong Kong	2015	0	0
Hong Kong	2016	0	0
Hong Kong	2017	0	0
Hong Kong	2018	0	0
Hong Kong	2019	0	0
Hong Kong	2020	0	0
Hong Kong	2021	2	0
Hong Kong	2022	3	0
Total		6	0

#	Date	Venue	Opponent	Result	Scored	Competition
	6 September 2013	Thuwunna Stadium, Yangon, Myanmar	Myanmar	0–0	0	Friendly
1	10 September 2013	Mong Kok Stadium, Mong Kok, Hong Kong	Singapore	1–0	0	Friendly
2	3 June 2021	Al Muharraq Stadium, Arad, Bahrain	Iran	1–3	0	2022 FIFA World Cup qualification – AFC second round
3	11 June 2021	Al Muharraq Stadium, Arad, Bahrain	Iraq	0–1	0	2022 FIFA World Cup qualification – AFC second round
4	1 June 2022	National Stadium Bukit Jalil, Kuala Lumpur, Malaysia	Malaysia	0–2	0	Friendly
5	8 June 2022	Salt Lake Stadium, Kolkata, India	Afghanistan	2–1	0	2023 AFC Asian Cup qualification – third round
6	11 June 2022	Salt Lake Stadium, Kolkata, India	Cambodia	3–0	0	2023 AFC Asian Cup qualification – third round

== Honours ==
=== Club ===
Lee Man

- Hong Kong Premier League: 2023–24
- Hong Kong Sapling Cup: 2018–19
- Hong Kong League Cup: 2025–26
