= Vladimir Karalić =

Bosnian-Herzegovinian retired footballer (born 1984)

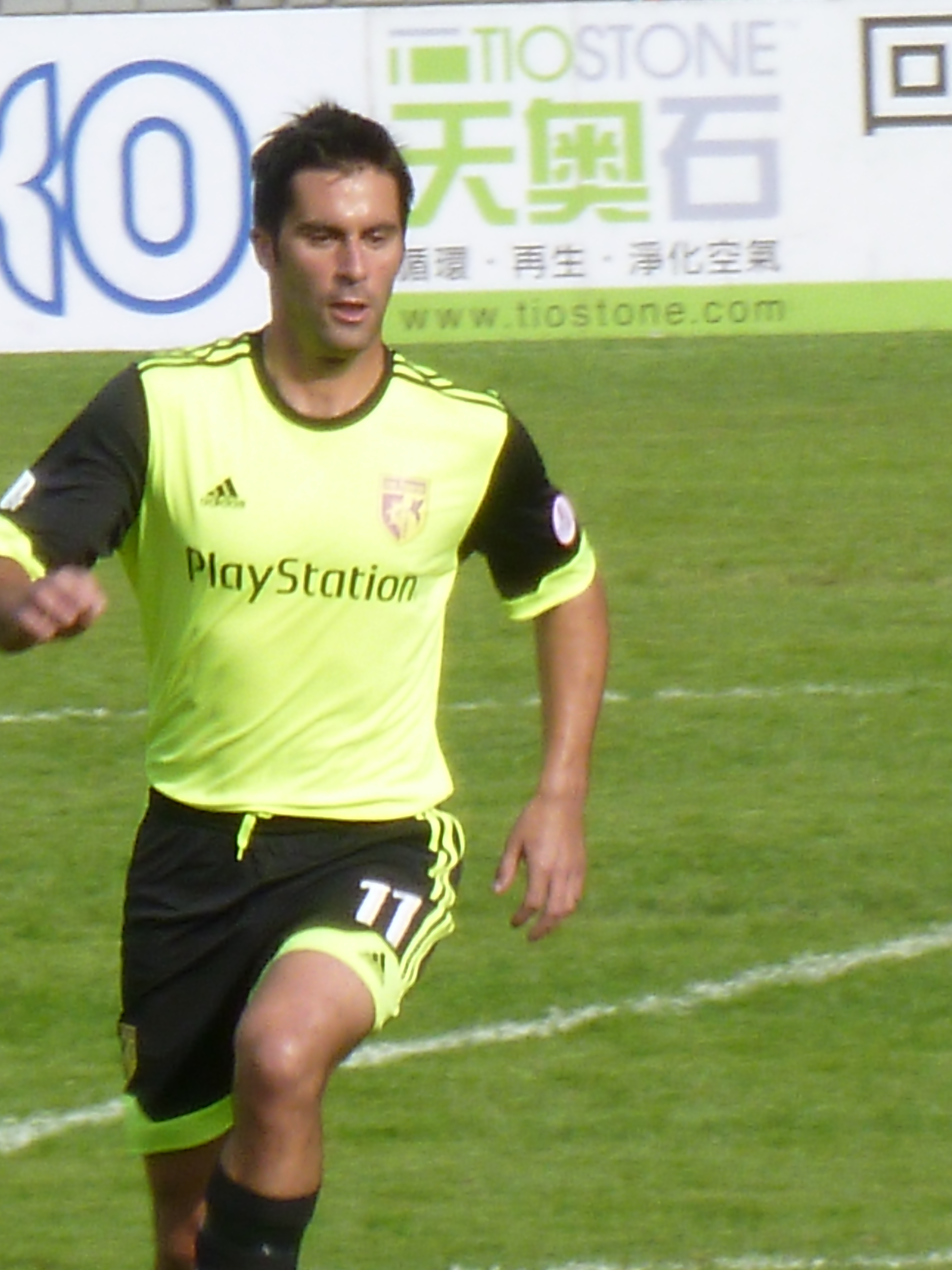

Personal information
- Date of birth: 22 March 1984 (age 42)
- Place of birth: Belgrade, SFR Yugoslavia
- Height: 1.86 m (6 ft 1 in)
- Position: Forward

Youth career
- Borac Banja Luka
- Olympiacos
- Nea Salamis Famagusta

Senior career*
Years	Team	Apps	(Gls)
2004–2005	Borac Banja Luka	24	(4)
2005	PAOK	0	(0)
2006	FK Sarajevo	3	(0)
2006	Primorje	12	(1)
2007	Sylvia	9	(0)
2007–2008	GOŠK Gabela	25	(13)
2008	Sloboda Tuzla	1	(0)
2009	BSK Banja Luka		
2009	Laktaši	15	(8)
2010	Polonia Bytom	0	(0)
2011	Sloboda Mrkonjić Grad	10	(5)
2011	Travnik	13	(1)
2012	Iskra Bugojno		
2012	Rudar Prijedor	4	(0)
2013	Sun Pegasus	7	(2)
2013	Sloboda Mrkonjić Grad	10	(13)
2016–2017	BSK Banja Luka		
2021	SK Bischofshofen		

International career
2007	Bosnia and Herzegovina	1	(0)
- * Club domestic league appearances and goals

Vladimir Karalić (Serbian Cyrillic: Bлaдимиp Kapaлић; born 22 March 1984) is a Bosnian former professional footballer who played as a forward.

Karalić has represented Bosnia and Herzegovina national team once in 2007.

== Club career ==
=== Sun Pegasus ===
On 11 January 2013, Karalić joined Hong Kong First Division League club Sun Pegasus from Rudar Prijedor for an undisclosed fee. After the season ended, Karalić was released by Sun Pegasus.

== International career ==
Karalić has made an appearance for the Bosnia and Herzegovina national team in a friendly match against Poland on 15 December 2007.

== Personal life ==
His father Slobodan Karalić was a professional football player.

== Career statistics ==
=== Hong Kong ===
As of 11 January 2013. The following table only shows statistics in Hong Kong.

Club	Season	Division	League		Senior Shield		League Cup		FA Cup		AFC Cup		Total	
Club	Season	Division	Apps	Goals	Apps	Goals	Apps	Goals	Apps	Goals	Apps	Goals	Apps	Goals
Sun Pegasus	2012–13	First Division	1	0	0	0	—	—	0	0	N/A	N/A	0	0
Sun Pegasus Total			1	0	0	0	0	0	0	0	0	0	0	0
Hong Kong Total			1	0	0	0	0	0	0	0	0	0	0	0
