= Lo Chun Kit =

Hong Kong footballer (born 1985)

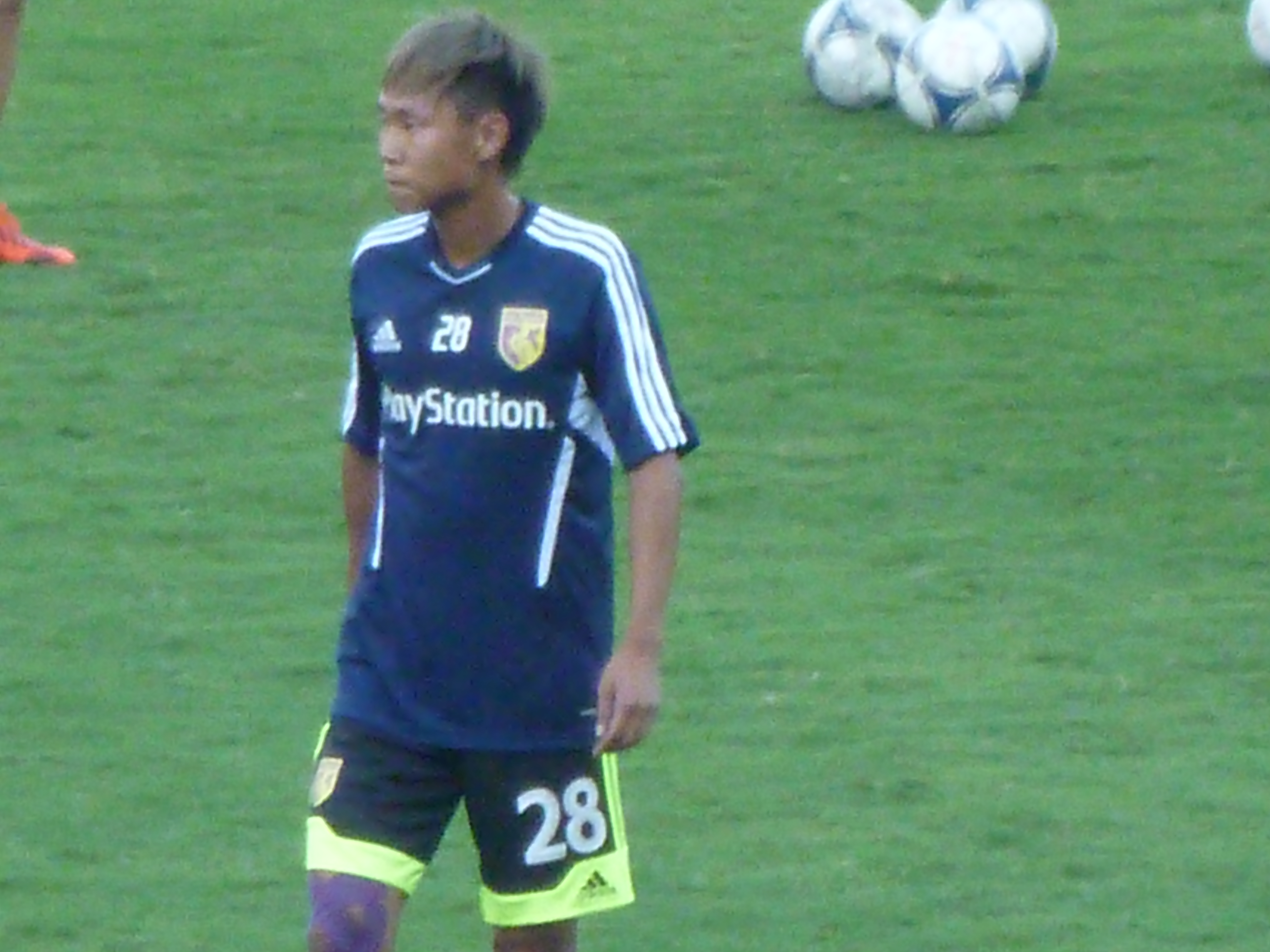

Personal information
- Full name: Toby Lo Chun Kit
- Date of birth: 13 November 1985 (age 40)
- Place of birth: Hong Kong
- Height: 1.73 m (5 ft 8 in)
- Position: Right back

Senior career*
Years	Team	Apps	(Gls)
2004–2006	Citizen	19	(0)
2006–2007	Hong Kong 08	13	(0)
2007–2008	Eastern	9	(0)
2008–2009	South China	8	(0)
2009–2011	Pegasus	0	(0)
2009–2011	→ Tai Chung (loan)	30	(0)
2011–2012	Wanchai	20	(4)
2012–2015	Pegasus	22	(1)
- * Club domestic league appearances and goals as of 28 November 2020

Toby Lo Chun Kit (Chinese: 盧俊傑; Jyutping: lou^{4} zeon^{3} git^{6}, born 13 November 1985) is a Hong Kong former professional footballer who played as a right back.

== Career statistics ==
=== Club ===
As at 20 September 2008

Club	Season	League		Senior Shield		League Cup		FA Cup		AFC Cup		Total	
Club	Season	Apps	Goals	Apps	Goals	Apps	Goals	Apps	Goals	Apps	Goals	Apps	Goals
South China	2008–09	4 (4)	0	1 (1)	0	0 (0)	0	0 (0)	0	1 (1)	0	6 (6)	0
All		4 (4)	0	1 (1)	0	0 (0)	0	0 (0)	0	1 (1)	0	6 (6)	0
TSW Pegasus	2009–10	0 (0)	0	0 (0)	0	0 (0)	0	0 (0)	0	N/A	N/A	0 (0)	0
All		0 (0)	0	0 (0)	0	0 (0)	0	0 (0)	0	N/A	N/A	0 (0)	0
Tai Chung	2009–10	6 (0)	0	1 (0)	0	0 (0)	0	0 (0)	0	N/A	N/A	7 (0)	0
All		6 (0)	0	1 (0)	0	0 (0)	0	0 (0)	0	0 (0)	0	7 (0)	0

== Accolades ==
Awards
Preceded by Chan Siu Ki; Leung Chun Pong	Hong Kong First Division League Best Youth Player Award; 2007–08 with Kwok Kin Pong	Succeeded by Au Yeung Yiu Chung; Li Hon Ho
