= Igor Miović =

Serbian footballer

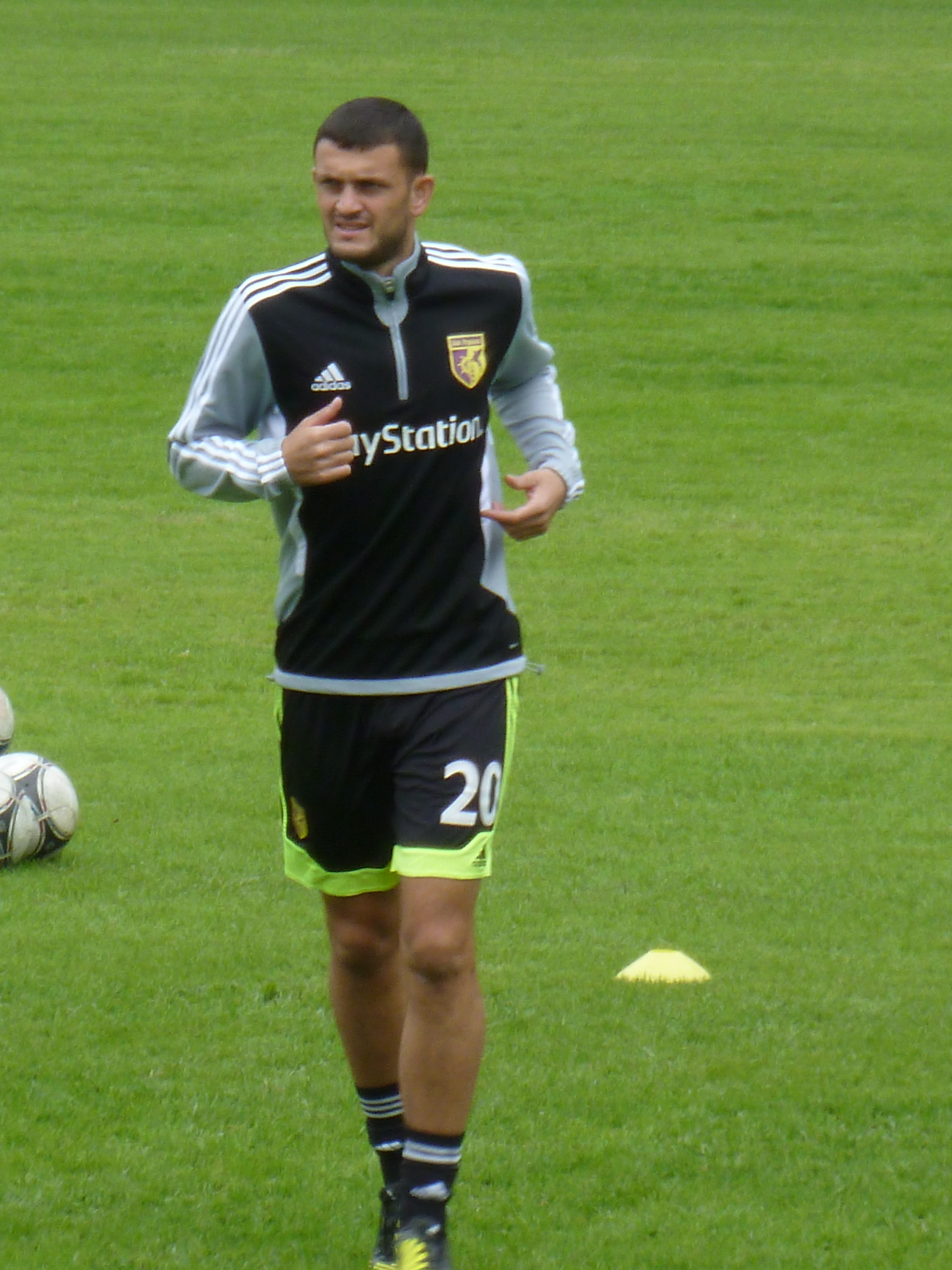

Personal information
- Full name: Igor Miović
- Date of birth: 31 March 1986 (age 40)
- Place of birth: Smederevo, SFR Yugoslavia
- Height: 1.88 m (6 ft 2 in)
- Position: Centre-back

Senior career*
Years	Team	Apps	(Gls)
2005	Železničar Smederevo	15	(1)
2006–2009	INON Požarevac	77	(6)
2009–2013	Smederevo	59	(0)
2013–2015	Sun Pegasus	38	(3)
2015–2017	Dinamo Vranje	13	(0)
2017	Biu Chun Glory Sky	9	(1)
2017–2018	Hong Kong Rangers	17	(1)
2018–2020	Happy Valley	35	(6)
- * Club domestic league appearances and goals as of 28 May 2020

Igor Miović (Serbian Cyrillic: Игор Миовић; Chinese: 摩域治; born 31 March 1986 in Smederevo) is a Serbian football defender who is currently a free agent.

He previously played with FK Smederevo, Železničar Smederevo, INON Požarevac and Hong Kong First Division League club Sun Pegasus.

== Club career ==
=== Sun Pegasus ===
On 11 January 2013, Miović joined Hong Kong First Division League club Sun Pegasus for an undisclosed fee. Miović made his debut for Sun Pegasus on 2 February 2013 in a league match against South China, with the match ending 1–1. He scored his first goal for Sun Pegasus on 16 February 2013 in a FA Cup clash against Tuen Mun – a campaign in which Sun Pegasus finished as runners-up.

On 14 September 2013, Miović netted a brace for the first time in his professional career in a thrilling 5–3 victory against South China.

=== Rangers ===
On 27 June 2017, Miovć signed with Rangers after a six month stint with Biu Chun Glory Sky.

== Honours ==
=== Club ===
Happy Valley

- Hong Kong First Division: 2018–19

=== Individual ===
- Hong Kong First Division Team of the Year: 2013–14
