= Lee Wai Lun =

Hong Kong footballer

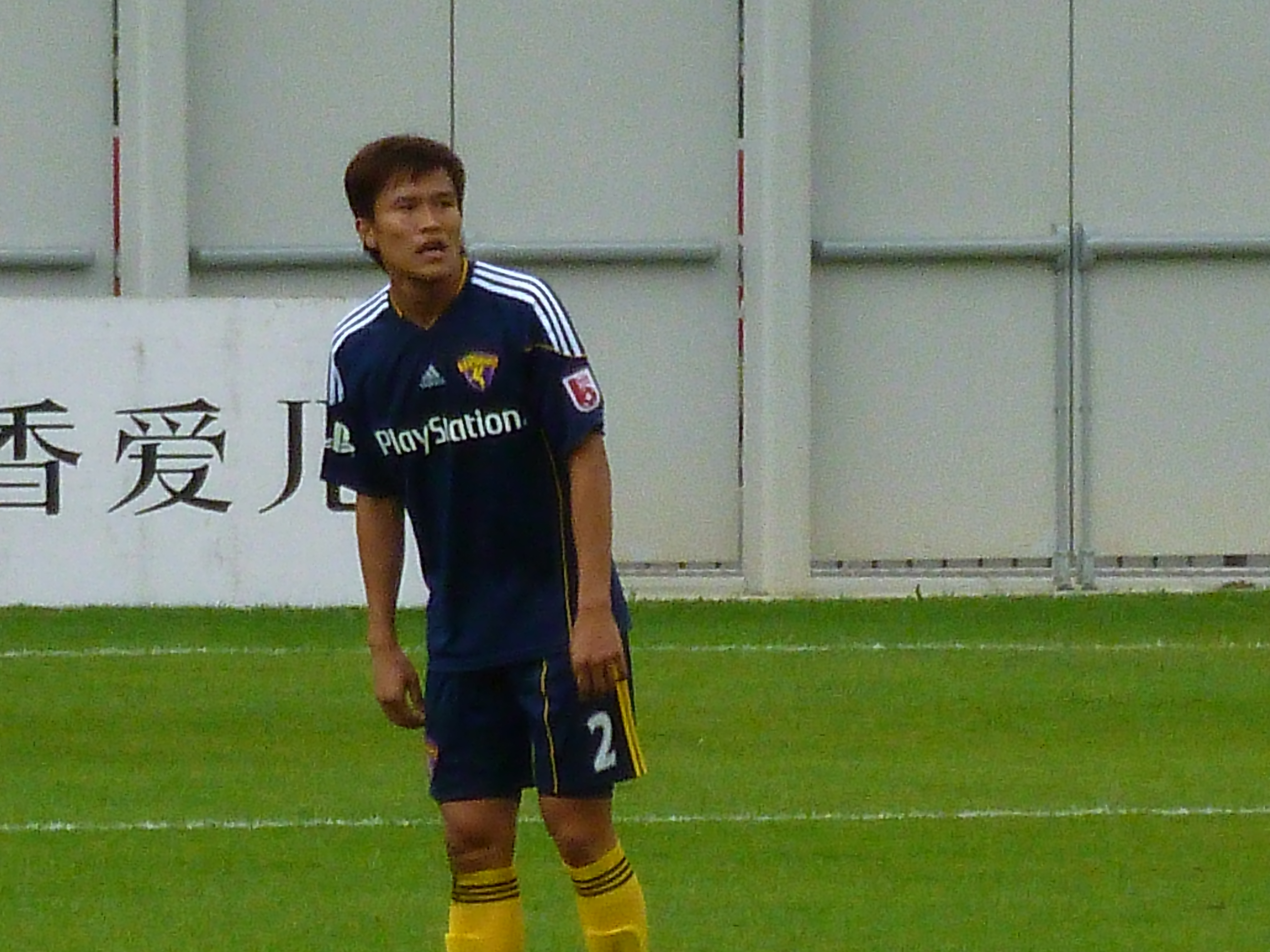

Personal information
- Full name: Lee Wai Lun
- Date of birth: 7 March 1981 (age 45)
- Place of birth: Hong Kong
- Height: 1.78 m (5 ft 10 in)
- Position: Right back

Senior career*
Years	Team	Apps	(Gls)
1999–2000	Kitchee		
2000–2001	Po Chai Pills		
2001–2009	Sun Hei	81	(1)
2009–2010	South China	22	(0)
2010–2013	Pegasus	51	(1)
2015–2016	North District	29	(2)
2016–2017	Metro Gallery	23	(1)
2017–2025	Eastern District	138	(3)
2025–	Sun Hei		

International career^{‡}
2006–2010	Hong Kong	23	(0)
- * Club domestic league appearances and goals as of 30 June 2025 ‡ National team caps and goals as of 02:01, 14 July 2010 (UTC)

Lee Wai Lun (Chinese: 利偉倫; Jyutping: lei^{6} wai^{5} leon^{4}; born 7 March 1981) is a Hong Kong former professional footballer who played as a right back. He was a member and vice-captain of the Hong Kong national football team.

== Club career ==
=== Pegasus ===
On 24 Oct 2013, Lee announced that he would retire from professional football. Two days later, Lee was made captain in his final game against Tuen Mun. Lee scored a goal in extra time and Pegasus won the game by 6–0. After the game, Lee was congratulated and thanked by his fellow players and manager, as well as a standing ovation from the fans.

== Career statistics ==
=== Club ===
As of 20 September 2008

Club	Season	League		Senior Shield		League Cup		FA Cup		AFC Cup		Total	
Club	Season	Apps	Goals	Apps	Goals	Apps	Goals	Apps	Goals	Apps	Goals	Apps	Goals
South China	2008-09	7 (1)	0	N/A	N/A	0 (0)	0	2 (1)	0	6 (0)	0	15 (2)	0
South China	2009-10	3 (0)	0	0 (0)	0	0 (0)	0	0 (0)	0	2 (2)	0	5 (2)	0
South China	All	10 (1)	0	0 (0)	0	0 (0)	0	2 (1)	0	8 (2)	0	20 (4)	0

=== International ===
As of 14 February 2010

#	Date	Venue	Opponent	Result	Scored	Competition
1	29 January 2006	Hong Kong Stadium, Hong Kong	Denmark	0–3	0	2006 Carlsberg Cup
2	15 February 2006	Hong Kong Stadium, Hong Kong	Singapore	1–1	0	Friendly
3	18 February 2006	Hong Kong Stadium, Hong Kong	India	2–2	0	Friendly
4	12 August 2006	Hong Kong Stadium, Hong Kong	Singapore	1–2	0	Friendly
5	16 August 2006	Pakhtakor Markaziy Stadium, Tashkent, Uzbekistan	Uzbekistan	2–2	0	2007 AFC Asian Cup qualification
6	6 September 2006	Hong Kong Stadium, Hong Kong	Uzbekistan	0–0	0	2007 AFC Asian Cup qualification
7	11 October 2006	Al-Gharafa Stadium, Doha, Qatar	Qatar	0–2	0	2007 AFC Asian Cup qualification
8	15 November 2006	Mong Kok Stadium, Hong Kong	Bangladesh	2–0	0	2007 AFC Asian Cup qualification
9	1 June 2007	Gelora Bung Karno Stadium, Jakarta, Indonesia	Indonesia	0–3	0	Friendly
10	10 June 2007	So Kon Po Recreation Ground, Hong Kong	Macau	2–1	0	2007 Hong Kong–Macau Interport
11	19 June 2007	Estádio Campo Desportivo, Macau	Chinese Taipei	1–1	0	2008 EAFF Championship Preliminary
12	21 June 2007	Estádio Campo Desportivo, Macau	Guam	15–1	0	2008 EAFF Championship Preliminary
13	24 June 2007	Estádio Campo Desportivo, Macau	North Korea	0–1	0	2008 EAFF Championship Preliminary
14	28 October 2007	Hong Kong Stadium, Hong Kong	Timor-Leste	8–1	0	2010 FIFA World Cup qualification
15	10 November 2007	Hong Kong Stadium, Hong Kong	Turkmenistan	0–0	0	2010 FIFA World Cup qualification
16	18 November 2007	Olympic Stadium, Ashgabat, Turkmenistan	Turkmenistan	0–3	0	2010 FIFA World Cup qualification
17	18 November 2007	Macau UST Stadium, Macau	Macau	9–1	0	Friendly
18	23 August 2009	World Games Stadium, Kaohsiung, Taiwan	Chinese Taipei	4–0	0	2010 East Asian Football Championship Semi-Final
19	25 August 2009	World Games Stadium, Kaohsiung, Taiwan	North Korea	0–0	0	2010 East Asian Football Championship Semi-Final
20	27 August 2009	World Games Stadium, Kaohsiung, Taiwan	Guam	12–0	0	2010 East Asian Football Championship Semi-Final
21	9 October 2009	Outsourcing Stadium, Shizuoka, Japan	Japan	0–6	0	2011 AFC Asian Cup qualification
22	6 January 2010	National Stadium, Madinat 'Isa, Bahrain	Bahrain	0–4	0	2011 AFC Asian Cup qualification
23	14 February 2010	Olympic Stadium, Tokyo, Japan	China	0–2	0	2010 East Asian Football Championship
