= Paulo Cesar (footballer, born 1979) =

Brazilian footballer

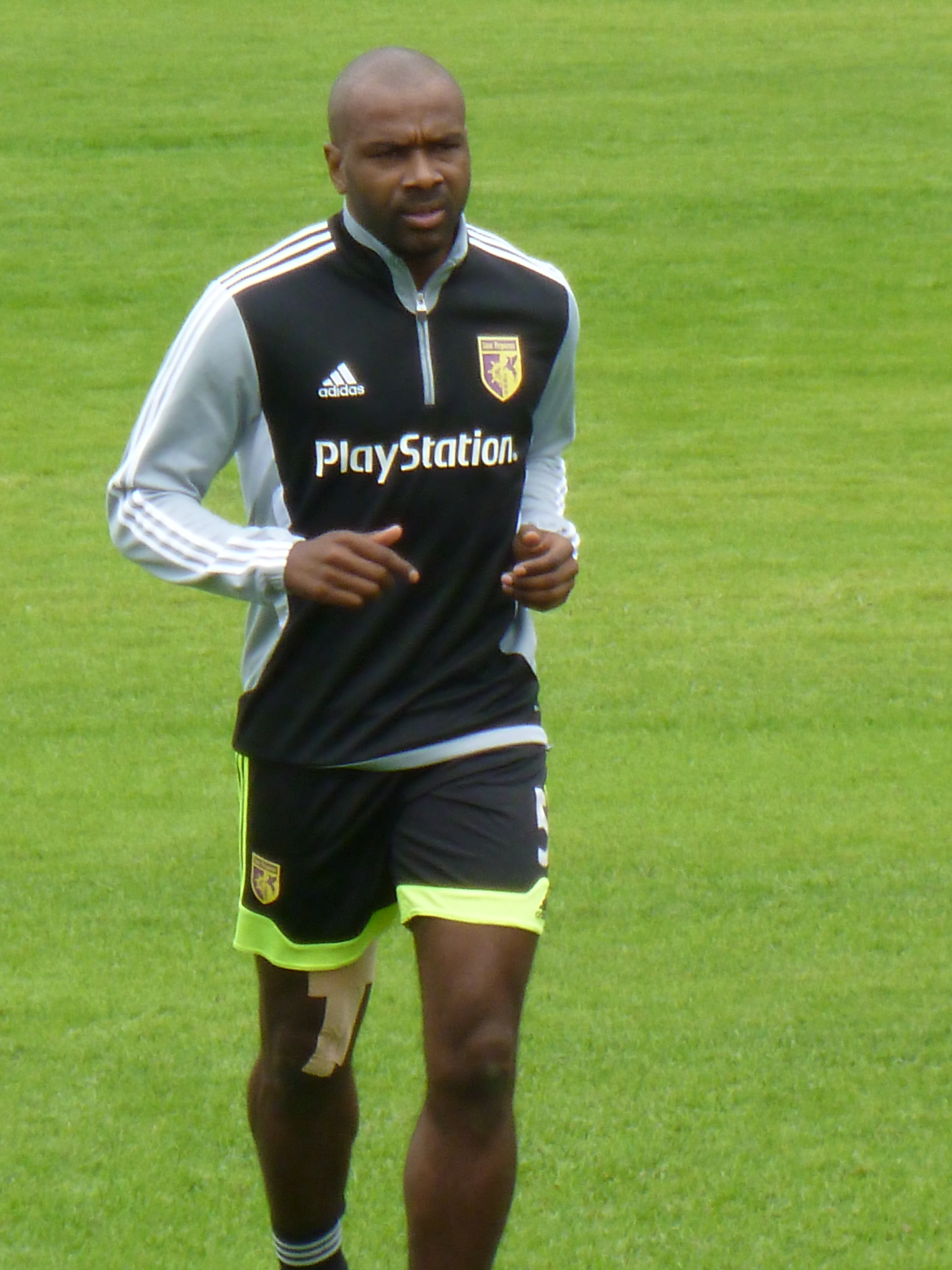

Personal information
- Full name: Paulo Cesar Fonseca Nunes
- Date of birth: January 20, 1979 (age 47)
- Place of birth: Pelotas, Brazil
- Height: 1.90 m (6 ft 3 in)
- Position: Center back

Youth career
- Ituano

Senior career*
Years	Team	Apps	(Gls)
1999	Ituano		
2000–2001	Grêmio		
2001	→ Stuttgarter Kickers (loan)	5	(0)
2001–2004	Joinville (loan)		
2003	→ Campinense (loan)		
2004	→ Lages (loan)		
2004	→ Anxinyuan (loan)		
2005–2008	Esportivo		
2006	→ J. Malucelli (loan)		
2007	→ Avaí (loan)		
2007	→ Al-Shamal (loan)		
2008–2011	Novo Hamburgo	6	(0)
2009	→ Shenyang (loan)		
2010	→ Shahrdari Tabriz (loan)	0	(0)
2011	Santa Cruz	4	(0)
2012–2013	Central	6	(0)
2013–2014	Sun Pegasus	15	(2)
- * Club domestic league appearances and goals

Paulo Cesar Fonseca Nunes (Chinese: 施薩; born January 20, 1979), known as Paulo Cesar, is a Brazilian former professional footballer.

== Club career ==
In 2009, Cesar played six games for Novo Hamburgo. He joined Shahrdari Tabriz on loan in 2010.

=== Sun Pegasus ===
On 11 January 2013, Cesar joined Hong Kong First Division League club Sun Pegasus from Brazil club Central SC for an undisclosed fee.
