= Li Jian (footballer, born September 1985) =

Hong Kong footballer (born 1985)

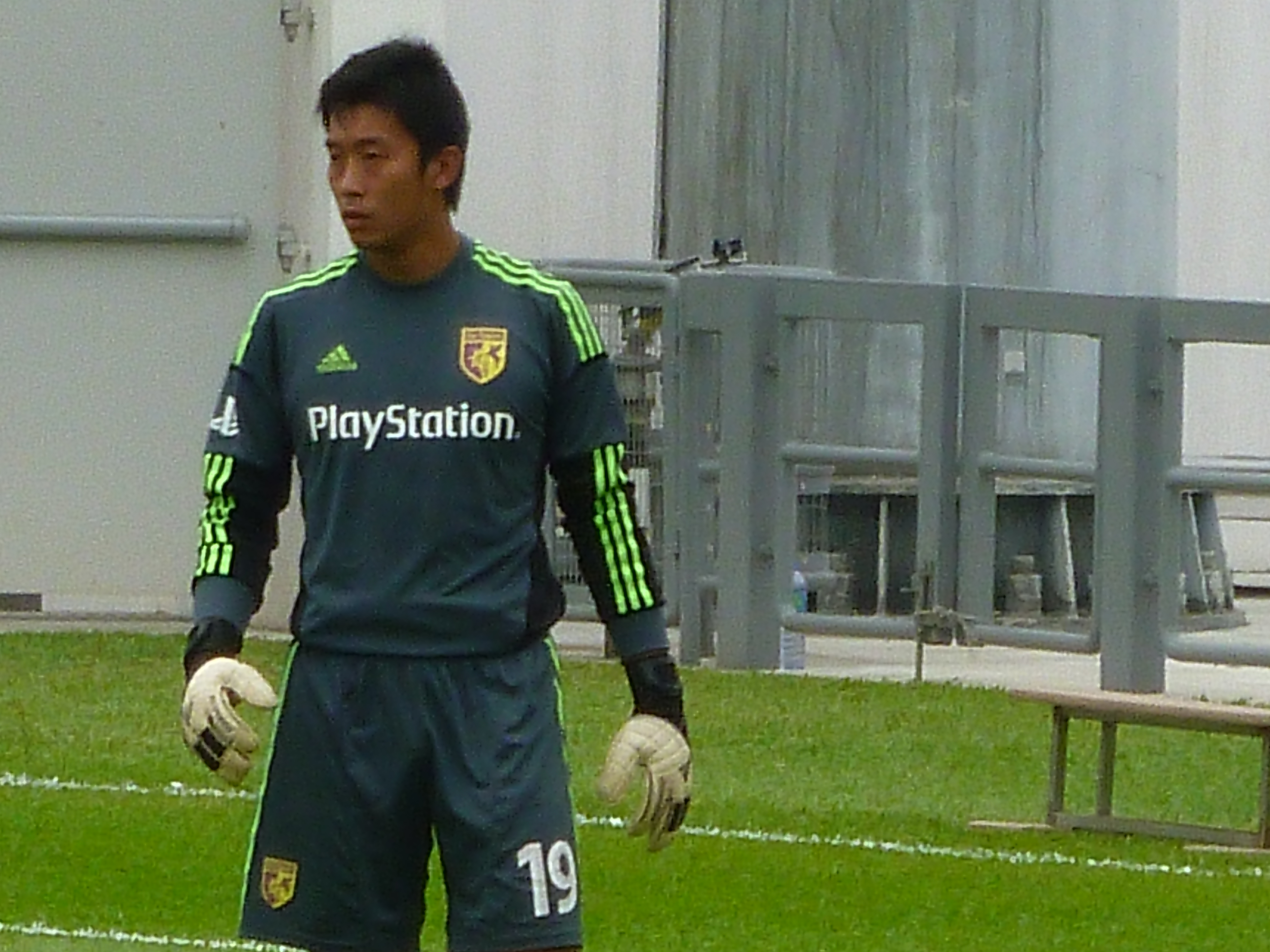

Personal information
- Full name: Li Jian
- Date of birth: 19 September 1985 (age 41)
- Place of birth: Guangdong, China
- Height: 1.85 m (6 ft 1 in)
- Position: Goalkeeper

Senior career*
| Years | Team | Apps | (Gls) |
| 2003 | Guangzhou Xiangxue | | |
| 2003 | Kitchee | 0 | (0) |
| 2003–2005 | Rangers (HKG) | 5 | (0) |
| 2005–2006 | Hong Kong 08 | 9 | (0) |
| 2006–2008 | Kitchee | 13 | (0) |
| 2008–2010 | Pegasus | 17 | (0) |
| 2010–2012 | Kitchee | 1 | (0) |
| 2012–2013 | Pegasus | 10 | (0) |
| 2013–2014 | Rangers (HKG) | 7 | (0) |

International career^{‡}
| 2007–2008 | Hong Kong U23 | 5 | (0) |
- * Club domestic league appearances and goals as of 21 October 2012 ‡ National team caps and goals as of 30 July 2009

Li Jian (Chinese: 李健; Jyutping: lei^{5} gin^{6}, born 19 September 1985) is a former professional footballer who played as a goalkeeper. Born in China, he represented Hong Kong internationally.

== Career statistics ==
=== Club career ===
Updated 11 September 2009

| Club | Season | League | | Senior Shield | | League Cup | | FA Cup | | AFC Cup | | Total | |
| Club | Season | Apps | Goals | Apps | Goals | Apps | Goals | Apps | Goals | Apps | Goals | Apps | Goals |
|---|---|---|---|---|---|---|---|---|---|---|---|---|---|
| Pegasus | 2008–09 | 13 (0) | 0 | 1 (0) | 0 | 1 (0) | 0 | 4 (0) | 0 | N/A | N/A | 19 (0) | 0 |
| Pegasus | 2009–10 | 0 (1) | 0 | 0 (0) | 0 | 0 (0) | 0 | 0 (0) | 0 | N/A | N/A | 0 (1) | 0 |
| Pegasus | All | 13 (1) | 0 | 1 (0) | 0 | 1 (0) | 0 | 4 (0) | 0 | N/A | N/A | 19 (1) | 0 |
