= 2013–14 South China AA season =

South China AA
2013–14 season
- Chairman: Steven Lo
- Head Coach: Cheung Po Chun (Until 17 February 2014); Yeung Ching Kwong (From 17 February 2014)
- Home Ground: Hong Kong Stadium (Capacity: 40,000)
- First Division: 2nd
- Senior Shield: Winner
- FA Cup: Round of 16
- AFC Champions League: Playoffs 2nd Round
- AFC Cup: Group Stage
- HK–Shanghai Inter Club Championship: Runner-up
- Highest home attendance: 3,493 (21 September vs Kitchee, First Division)
- Lowest home attendance: 669 (15 December vs Tuen Mun, First Division)
- Average home league attendance: 1,773 (in all competition)
Home colours	Away colours

The 2013–14 season is South China's 93rd season in the Hong Kong First Division League. South China will seek to defend their league title, as well as to fight for victory in Senior Challenge Shield and FA Cup. They will also participate in the AFC Cup for the first time in three seasons.

== Key events ==
- 15 May 2013: The club confirmed that they will not extend Brazilian forward Alessandro Celin's contract while Joel, Dhiego Martins and Ticão will stay at the club. Itaparica, Chan Wai Ho, Lee Chi Ho and Lee Wai Lim have finished their contract and are uncertain about their future.
- 16 May 2013: Hong Kong defender Chan Cham Hei and Brazilian forward Alessandro Celin are released by the club.
- 31 May 2013: Brazilian midfielder João Emir Porto Pereira rejoins the club on a free transfer. He played for the club in the 2011–12 season but left the club after the season.
- 31 May 2013: Brazilian midfielder Aender Naves Mesquita joins the club from newly relegated club Wofo Tai Po on a free transfer.
- 31 May 2013: Taiwanese-Spanish defender Victor Chou is released by the club.
- 1 June 2013: Chinese-born Hong Kong goalkeeper Zhang Chunhui rejoins the club from fellow First Division club Sunray Cave JC Sun Hei for an undisclosed fee.
- 1 June 2013: The club confirms that Lee Chi Ho will leave the club while Chan Wai Ho chooses to stay.
- 7 June 2013: Hong Kong midfielder Au Yeung Yiu Chung joins First Division club Yokohama FC Hong Kong on a free transfer after his contract expiries and is released by the club.
- 8 June 2013: Hong Kong defender Chan Cham Hei joins First Division club Biu Chun Rangers on a free transfer after his contract expiries and is released by the club.
- 11 June 2013: Brazilian midfielder Itaparica leaves the club and joins newly promoted First Division club Eastern Salon on a free transfer.
- 11 June 2013: Hong Kong midfielder Man Pei Tak leaves the club and joins newly promoted First Division club Eastern Salon on a free transfer after his contract expiries and is released by the club.
- 11 June 2013: Hong Kong midfielder Chan Siu Kwan joins the club from fellow First Division club Yokohama FC Hong Kong for an undisclosed fee.
- 12 June 2013: Guinean striker Mamadou Barry joins the club from fellow First Division club Sunray Cave JC Sun Hei for free.
- 14 June 2013: Hong Kong international defender Lee Chi Ho leaves the club and joins Chinese Super League club Beijing Guoan for free.
- 20 June 2013: Head coach Liu Chun Fai confirms that he failed to reach an agreement with the club and thus leaves the club after the 1-year contract ends.
- 28 June 2013: Hong Kong goalkeeper Tsang Man Fai joins the club from fellow First Division Yokohama FC Hong Kong for an undisclosed fee.
- 28 June 2013: Hong Kong striker Lo Kong Wai joins the club from fellow First Division club Yokohama FC Hong Kong for an undisclosed fee.
- 1 July 2013: The club appoints Cheung Po Chun as the head coach successor of Liu Chun Fai.
- 1 July 2013: The club announces the departure of Yapp Hung Fai, Adam Tse Chi Keung and Filipe de Souza Conceicao. Yapp Hung Fai is set to join Chinese Super League club Guizhou Renhe but the deal is yet to finalised.
- 2 July 2013: Unattached Australian defender Jovo Pavlović joins the club on a free transfer.
- 2 July 2013: Australian-Hong Kong defender Liu Stephen Garlock joins the club from fellow First Division club Yokohama FC Hong Kong for an undisclosed fee.
- 2 July 2013: Hong Kong defender Chan Wai Ho signs a 2-year extension contract with the club.
- 18 July 2013: Hong Kong goalkeeper Yapp Hung Fai fails to join Chinese Super League club Guizhou Renhe as Chinese club cannot sign any non-Chinese player. Yapp's contract with the club ends in July 2014.
- 6 August 2013: Hong Kong goalkeeper Tsang Man Fai joins fellow First Division club Royal Southern on loan until the end of the season.
- 6 August 2013: Brazil-born Hong Kong striker Filipe de Souza Conceicao joins fellow First Division club Sunray Cave JC Sun Hei on loan until the end of the season.
- 8 August 2013: Australian defender Jovo Pavlović is released by the club.
- 26 August 2013: Unattached South Korean defender Ko Kyung-Joon joins the club on a free transfer.
- 28 August 2013: Hong Kong midfielder Law Chun Yan signs his first professional contract with the club after being promoted to the first team.
- 30 September 2013: Hong Kong defender Lee Chi Ho signs a 3-month loan contract with the club.
- 5 December 2013: Dutch winger Vincent Weijl joins the club on a free transfer. It is noted that Joel's registration is cancelled so as to leave a place for Weiji.
- 27 December 2013: Brazilian midfielder Aender Naves Mesquita joins fellow First Division club Biu Chun Rangers on loan until the end of the season.
- 31 December 2013: Hong Kong striker Chan Siu Ki rejoins the club from Chinese League One club Guangdong Sunray Cave on a free transfer.
- 31 December 2013: Hong Kong midfielder Leung Chun Pong rejoins the club from Chinese League One club Guangdong Sunray Cave on a free transfer.
- 31 December 2013: Bosnian striker Saša Kajkut joins the club from Bosnian Premier League club Čelik Zenica on a free transfer after a successful trial.
- 31 December 2013: Australian striker Andrew Barisic joins the club from Australia Victorian Premier League club Melbourne Knights on a free transfer.
- 3 January 2014: Hong Kong defender Lee Chi Ho rejoins the club from Chinese Super League club Beijing Guoan for an undisclosed fee.
- 6 January 2014: Guinean striker Mamadou Barry leaves the club and joins Malaysia Super League club Terengganu on a free transfer.
- 6 January 2014: Brazilian defender Joel Bertoti Padilha joins fellow First Division club Biu Chun Rangers on loan until the end of the season.
- 14 January 2014: Chinese-born Hong Kong goalkeeper Zhang Chunhui terminates the contract and leaves the club.
- 14 January 2014: Hong Kong goalkeeper Leung Hing Kit joins the club on loan from fellow First Division club Biu Chun Rangers until the end of the season.

== Players ==
=== Squad information ===
N	P	Nat.	Name	Date of birth	Age	Since	Previous club	Notes
1	GK	(Hong Kong)	Yapp Hung Fai^{LP}	21 March 1990	24	2010	(Hong Kong) TSW Pegasus	
2	DF	(Hong Kong)	Lee Chi Ho^{LP}	16 November 1982	31	2014 (Winter)	(China) Beijing Guoan	
4	DF	(Hong Kong)	Sean Tse^{LP}	3 May 1992	22	2012	(England) Manchester City	Second nationality: Hong Kong
5	DF	(Hong Kong)	Chak Ting Fung^{LP}	27 November 1989	24	2013 (Winter)	(Hong Kong) Biu Chun Rangers	
7	FW	(Hong Kong)	Chan Siu Ki^{LP}	14 July 1985	28	2014 (Winter)	(China) Guangdong Sunray Cave	
8	MF	(Brazil)	Ticão^{FP}	7 February 1985	29	2012	(Brazil) Pelotas	Second nationality: Italy
9	MF	(Hong Kong)	Lee Wai Lim^{LP}	5 May 1981	33	2009	(Hong Kong) Tai Po	
10	MF	(Brazil)	João Emir Porto Pereira^{FP}	17 March 1989	25	2013	Free agent	
11	FW	(Bosnia and Herzegovina)	Saša Kajkut^{FP}	7 July 1984	29	2014 (Winter)	(Bosnia and Herzegovina) Čelik Zenica	
13	MF	(Hong Kong)	Law Chun Yan^{LP}	21 June 1994	20	2013	Youth system	
14	MF	(Netherlands)	Vincent Weijl^{FP}	11 November 1990	22	2013 (Winter)	(Netherlands) SC Cambuur	
15	DF	(Hong Kong)	Chan Wai Ho^{LP}	24 April 1982	32	2011 (Winter)	(Hong Kong) Fourway Rangers	Team captain
16	MF	(Hong Kong)	Chan Siu Kwan^{LP}	1 August 1992	21	2013	Yokohama FC Hong Kong	
17	MF	(Hong Kong)	Lee Hong Lim^{LP}	29 September 1983	30	2012	(Hong Kong) TSW Pegasus	
18	DF	(Hong Kong)	Kwok Kin Pong^{LP}	30 March 1987	27	2002	Youth system	Team vice-captain
19	FW	(Brazil)	Dhiego de Souza Martins^{FP}	27 August 1988	25	2011 (Winter)	(Brazil) Operário PR	
20	DF	(Australia)	Liu Stephen Garlock^{LP}	18 May 1992	22	2013	Yokohama FC Hong Kong	Second nationality: Hong Kong
21	MF	(Hong Kong)	Leung Chun Pong^{LP}	1 October 1986	27	2014 (Winter)	(China) Gunagdong Sunray Cave	
22	DF	(Hong Kong)	Jack Sealy^{LP}	4 May 1987	27	2012	(Hong Kong) Sunray Cave JC Sun Hei	Second nationality: England
23	MF	(Hong Kong)	Michael Luk Chi Ho^{LP}	22 August 1986	27	2012	(Hong Kong) Sunray Cave JC Sun Hei	Second nationality: Canada
24	MF	(Hong Kong)	Lo Kong Wai^{LP}	19 June 1992	21	2013	Yokohama FC Hong Kong	
25	GK	(Hong Kong)	Tin Man Ho^{LP}	5 March 1990	24	2012	(Hong Kong) Wanchai	From Youth system
27	FW	(Australia)	Andrew Barisic^{FP}	22 March 1986	28	2014 (Winter)	(Australia) Melbourne Knights	
31	FW	(Hong Kong)	Cheng Lai Hin^{LP}	31 March 1986	28	2010	(Hong Kong) Kitchee	
36	MF	(Hong Kong)	Kouta Jige^{LP}	23 April 1997	17	2011	Youth system	Second nationality: Japan
37	DF	(South Korea)	Ko Kyung-Joon^{FP}	7 March 1987	27	2013	Free agent	
39	GK	(Hong Kong)	Leung Hing Kit^{LP}	22 October 1989	24	2014 (Winter)	(Hong Kong) Biu Chun Rangers	On loan from Biu Chun Rangers
	GK	(Hong Kong)	Tsang Man Fai^{NR}	2 August 1991	22	2013	Yokohama FC Hong Kong	On loan to Royal Southern
	DF	(Brazil)	Joel Bertoti Padilha^{NR}	24 July 1980	33	2011 (Winter)	(China) Guangdong Sunray Cave	On loan to Biu Chun Rangers
	MF	(Brazil)	Aender Naves Mesquita^{NR}	12 February 1983	31	2013	(Hong Kong) Wofoo Tai Po	On loan to Biu Chun Rangers
	FW	(Hong Kong)	Filipe de Souza Conceicao^{NR}	11 November 1995	18	2011	Youth system	Second nationality: Brazil; On loan to Sunray Cave JC Sun Hei

Last update: 28 January 2014
Source: South China FC
Ordered by squad number.
^{LP}Local player; ^{FP}Foreign player; ^{NR}Non-registered player

=== 2014 AFC Champions League Squad ===
Note: Flags indicate national team as defined under FIFA eligibility rules; some limited exceptions apply. Players may hold more than one non-FIFA nationality.

No.	Pos.	Nation	Player
1	GK	HKG	Yapp Hung Fai
2	DF	HKG	Lee Chi Ho
5	DF	HKG	Chak Ting Fung
7	FW	HKG	Chan Siu Ki
8	MF	BRA	Ticão^{FP}
9	MF	HKG	Lee Wai Lim
11	FW	BIH	Saša Kajkut^{FP}
13	MF	HKG	Law Chun Yan
15	DF	HKG	Chan Wai Ho
16	MF	HKG	Chan Siu Kwan
17	MF	HKG	Lee Hong Lim

No.	Pos.	Nation	Player
18	DF	HKG	Kwok Kin Pong
21	MF	HKG	Leung Chun Pong
22	DF	HKG	Jack Sealy
23	MF	HKG	Michael Luk
24	MF	HKG	Lo Kong Wai
25	GK	HKG	Tin Man Ho
27	FW	AUS	Andrew Barisic^{FP}
31	FW	HKG	Cheng Lai Hin
37	DF	KOR	Ko Kyung-Joon^{AP}
39	GK	HKG	Leung Hing Kit

Remarks:
^{FP} These players are registered as foreign players.
^{AP} These players are registered as AFC Asian players.

=== 2014 AFC Cup squad ===
Note: Flags indicate national team as defined under FIFA eligibility rules; some limited exceptions apply. Players may hold more than one non-FIFA nationality.

No.	Pos.	Nation	Player
1	GK	HKG	Yapp Hung Fai
2	DF	HKG	Lee Chi Ho
4	DF	HKG	Sean Tse^{FP}
5	DF	HKG	Chak Ting Fung
7	FW	HKG	Chan Siu Ki
9	MF	HKG	Lee Wai Lim
10	MF	BRA	João Emir Porto Pereira^{FP}
11	FW	BIH	Saša Kajkut^{FP}
13	MF	HKG	Law Chun Yan
15	DF	HKG	Chan Wai Ho

No.	Pos.	Nation	Player
17	MF	HKG	Lee Hong Lim
18	DF	HKG	Kwok Kin Pong
21	MF	HKG	Leung Chun Pong
22	DF	HKG	Jack Sealy
23	MF	HKG	Michael Luk
24	MF	HKG	Lo Kong Wai
27	FW	AUS	Andrew Barisic^{AP}
31	FW	HKG	Cheng Lai Hin
39	GK	HKG	Leung Hing Kit

Remarks:
^{FP} These players are registered as foreign players.
^{AP} These players are registered as AFC Asian players.

=== Transfers ===
==== In ====
#	Position	Player	Transferred from	Fee	Date	Team	Source
10	MF	(Brazil) João Emir Porto Pereira	Free Agent	Free transfer	31 May 2013	First team	
11	MF	(Brazil) Aender Naves Mesquita	(Hong Kong) Wofoo Tai Po	Free transfer	31 May 2013	First team	
28	GK	(Hong Kong) Zhang Chunhui	(Hong Kong) Sunray Cave JC Sun Hei	Undisclosed	1 June 2013	First team	
16	MF	(Hong Kong) Chan Siu Kwan	Yokohama FC Hong Kong	Undisclosed	11 June 2013	First team	
29	FW	(Guinea) Mamadou Barry	(Hong Kong) Sunray Cave JC Sun Hei	Free transfer	12 June 2013	First team	
1	GK	(Hong Kong) Tsang Man Fai	Yokohama FC Hong Kong	Undisclosed	28 June 2013	First team	
24	MF	(Hong Kong) Lo Kong Wai	Yokohama FC Hong Kong	Undisclosed	28 June 2013	First team	
6	DF	(Australia) Jovo Pavlović	Free agent	Free transfer	2 July 2013	First team	
20	DF	(Australia) (Hong Kong) Liu Stephen Garlock	Yokohama FC Hong Kong	Undisclosed	2 July 2013	First team	
37	DF	(South Korea) Ko Kyung-Joon	Free agent	Free transfer	26 August 2013	First team	
13	MF	(Hong Kong) Law Chun Yan	Youth system	N/A	28 August 2013	First team	
14	MF	(Netherlands) Vincent Weijl	(Netherlands) SC Cambuur	Free transfer	5 December 2013	First team	
7	FW	(Hong Kong) Chan Siu Ki	(China) Guangdong Sunray Cave	Free transfer	31 December 2013	First team	
21	MF	(Hong Kong) Leung Chun Pong	(China) Guangdong Sunray Cave	Free transfer	31 December 2013	First team	
11	FW	(Bosnia and Herzegovina) Saša Kajkut	(Bosnia and Herzegovina) Čelik Zenica	Free transfer	31 December 2013	First team	
27	FW	(Australia) Andrew Barisic	(Australia) Melbourne Knights	Free transfer	31 December 2013	First team	
2	DF	(Hong Kong) Lee Chi Ho	(China) Beijing Guoan	Undisclosed	3 January 2014	First team	

==== Out ====
#	Position	Player	Transferred to	Fee	Date	Team	Source
16	FW	(Brazil) Alessandro Celin	Unattached	Free transfer	15 May 2013	First team	
10	MF	(Hong Kong) Au Yeung Yiu Chung	Yokohama FC Hong Kong	Free transfer	7 June 2013	First team	
3	DF	(Hong Kong) Chan Cham Hei	(Hong Kong) Biu Chun Rangers	Free transfer	8 June 2013	First team	
11	MF	(Brazil) Itaparica	(Hong Kong) Eastern Salon	Free transfer	11 June 2013	First team	
12	MF	(Hong Kong) Man Pei Tak	(Hong Kong) Eastern Salon	Free transfer	11 June 2013	First team	
2	DF	(Hong Kong) Lee Chi Ho	(China) Beijing Guoan	Free transfer	14 June 2013	First team	
20	FW	(Republic of Ireland) (Hong Kong) Adam Tse Chi Keung	Unattached (Released)	Free transfer	1 July 2013	First team	
6	DF	(Australia) Jovo Pavlović	Unattached (Released)	Free transfer	8 August 2013	First team	
29	FW	(Guinea) Mamadou Barry	(Malaysia) Terengganu	Free transfer	12 December 2013	First team	
28	GK	(Hong Kong) Zhang Chunhui	Unattached	Free transfer	14 January 2014	First team	

==== Loan in ====
#	Position	Player	Loaned from	Date	Loan expires	Team	Source
2	DF	(Hong Kong) Lee Chi Ho	(China) Beijing Guoan	30 September 2013	31 December 2013	First team	
39	GK	(Hong Kong) Leung Hing Kit	(Hong Kong) Biu Chun Rangers	14 January 2014	31 May 2014	First team	

==== Loan out ====
#	Position	Player	Loaned to	Date	Loan expires	Team	Source
1	GK	(Hong Kong) Tsang Man Fai	(Hong Kong) Royal Southern	6 August 2013	30 June 2014	First team	
27	FW	(Hong Kong) Filipe de Souza Conceicao	(Hong Kong) Sunray Cave JC Sun Hei	6 August 2013	30 June 2014	First team	
11	MF	(Brazil) Aender Naves Mesquita	(Hong Kong) Biu Chun Rangers	27 December 2013	31 May 2014	First team	
30	DF	(Brazil) Joel Bertoti Padilha	(Hong Kong) Biu Chun Rangers	6 January 2013	31 May 2014	First team	

== Club ==
=== Coaching staff ===
Position	Staff
Deputy Manager	(Hong Kong) Hui Ka Chuen
Head Coach	(Hong Kong) Cheung Po Chun
Assistant Coach	(Hong Kong) Ku Kam Fai
Assistant Coach	(Brazil) Edgar Aldrighi Júnior
Goalkeeper Coach	(Hong Kong) Fan Chun Yip
Physical Coach	(Brazil) Paulo Alexandre
Physical Therapist	(Hong Kong) Jacky Leung

Last updated: 2 July 2013
Source: South China Football Club

== Squad statistics ==
Note: Voided matches are not counted in the statistics except discipline records.

=== Overall statistics ===
	First Division	Senior Shield	FA Cup	AFC	Total Stats
Games played	14	3	2	6	25
Games won	6	3	1	2	12
Games drawn	7	0	1	0	8
Games lost	1	0	0	4	5
Goals for	27	8	3	8	46
Goals against	18	4	2	14	38
Players used	27	18	15	19	27^{1}
Yellow cards	22	7	11	14	54
Red cards	1	1	0	1	3

Last updated: 17 April 2014
Source: Player Stats

Players Used: South China has used a total of 27 different players in all competitions.

=== Appearances ===
				Total				League		Shield		FA Cup		Continental	
N	P	Nat.	Name	GS	App	Goals	Min	App	Goals	App	Goals	App	Goals	App	Goals
1	GK	(Hong Kong)	Yapp Hung Fai	19	19	–29	1800	8	–9	3	–4	2	–2	6	–14
25	GK	(Hong Kong)	Tin Man Ho	0	0	–0	0	0	–0	0	–0	0	–0	0	–0
39	GK	(Hong Kong)	Leung Hing Kit	3	3	–4	270	3	–4	0	–0	0	–0	0	–0
	GK	(Hong Kong)	Zhang Chunhui	3	3	–5	270	3	–5	0	–0	0	–0	0	–0
2	DF	(Hong Kong)	Lee Chi Ho	20	20	1	1831	10	1	3	0	2	0	5	0
4	DF	(Hong Kong)	Sean Tse	14	16	2	1138	9	2	2	0	2	0	3	0
5	DF	(Hong Kong)	Chak Ting Fung	10	11	1	936	7	1	3	0	0	0	1	0
15	DF	(Hong Kong)	Chan Wai Ho	13	17	0	1269	7	0	3	0	1	0	6	0
18	DF	(Hong Kong)	Kwok Kin Pong	22	23	3	2055	12	3	3	0	2	0	6	0
20	DF	(Australia)	Liu Stephen Garlock	0	0	0	0	0	0	0	0	0	0	0	0
22	DF	(Hong Kong)	Jack Sealy	14	17	1	1312	9	1	1	0	2	0	5	0
37	DF	(South Korea)	Ko Kyung-Joon	10	12	1	928	9	1	2	0	0	0	1	0
	DF	(Brazil)	Joel Bertoti Padilha	2	3	0	224	3	0	0	0	0	0	0	0
8	MF	(Brazil)	Ticão	17	17	1	1620	10	0	3	2	1	0	2	0
9	MF	(Hong Kong)	Lee Wai Lim	11	18	2	1008	10	1	2	2	0	0	6	0
10	MF	(Brazil)	João Emir	10	15	2	995	11	0	2	2	0	0	2	0
13	MF	(Hong Kong)	Law Chun Yan	0	0	0	0	0	0	0	0	0	0	0	0
14	MF	(Netherlands)	Vincent Weijl	12	12	2	994	7	2	3	0	2	0	0	0
16	MF	(Hong Kong)	Chan Siu Kwan	4	7	0	289	5	0	0	0	0	0	2	0
17	MF	(Hong Kong)	Lee Hong Lim	15	22	3	1511	13	2	2	0	2	0	6	1
21	MF	(Hong Kong)	Leung Chun Pong	10	11	0	815	4	0	0	0	1	0	6	0
23	MF	(Hong Kong)	Michael Luk	4	11	1	585	8	0	0	0	1	0	3	1
24	MF	(Hong Kong)	Lo Kong Wai	4	11	1	431	8	1	1	0	0	0	2	0
36	MF	(Hong Kong)	Kouta Jige	0	0	0	0	0	0	0	0	0	0	0	0
	MF	(Brazil)	Aender Naves	3	4	0	239	4	0	0	0	0	0	0	0
7	FW	(Hong Kong)	Chan Siu Ki	8	13	2	902	6	0	0	0	2	0	6	2
11	FW	(Bosnia and Herzegovina)	Saša Kajkut	9	11	6	790	2	2	1	1	2	1	5	2
19	FW	(Brazil)	Dhiego Martins	14	17	7	1221	12	6	3	1	2	0	0	0
27	FW	(Australia)	Andrew Barisic	11	11	7	1017	3	2	1	1	2	2	5	2
31	FW	(Hong Kong)	Cheng Lai Hin	7	10	1	581	6	1	1	0	0	0	3	0
	FW	(Guinea)	Mamadou Barry	6	7	5	572	7	5	0	0	0	0	0	0

Last update: 17 April 2014

=== Top scorers ===
Place	Position	Nationality	Number	Name	First Division	Senior Shield	FA Cup	Continental	Total
1	FW	(Brazil)	19	Dhiego de Souza Martins	6	1	0	0	7
1	FW	(Australia)	27	Andrew Barisic	2	1	2	2	7
3	FW	(Bosnia and Herzegovina)	11	Saša Kajkut	2	1	1	2	6
4	FW	(Guinea)		Mamadou Barry	4	0	0	0	4
5	DF	(Hong Kong)	4	Sean Tse	2	0	0	0	2
5	FW	(Hong Kong)	7	Chan Siu Ki	0	0	0	2	2
5	MF	(Hong Kong)	9	Lee Wai Lim	0	2	0	0	2
5	MF	(Brazil)	10	João Emir Porto Pereira	0	2	0	0	2
5	MF	(Netherlands)	14	Vincent Weijl	2	0	0	0	2
5	MF	(Hong Kong)	17	Lee Hong Lim	1	0	0	1	2
5	DF	(Hong Kong)	18	Kwok Kin Pong	2	0	0	0	2
11	DF	(Hong Kong)	2	Lee Chi Ho	1	0	0	0	1
11	DF	(Hong Kong)	5	Chak Ting Fung	1	0	0	0	1
11	MF	(Brazil)	8	Ticão	0	1	0	0	1
11	DF	(Hong Kong)	22	Jack Sealy	1	0	0	0	1
11	MF	(Hong Kong)	23	Michael Luk	0	0	0	1	1
11	MF	(Hong Kong)	24	Lo Kong Wai	1	0	0	0	1
11	FW	(Hong Kong)	31	Cheng Lai Hin	1	0	0	0	1
11	DF	(South Korea)	37	Ko Kyung-Joon	1	0	0	0	1
TOTALS					27	8	3	8	46

Last update: 17 April 2014

=== Disciplinary record ===
Includes all competitive matches. Players listed below made at least one appearance for the South China first squad during the season.

N	P	Nat.	Name	League			Shield			FA Cup			Continental			Total			Notes
N	P	Nat.	Name	Yellow card	Second yellow card	Red card	Yellow card	Second yellow card	Red card	Yellow card	Second yellow card	Red card	Yellow card	Second yellow card	Red card	Yellow card	Second yellow card	Red card	Notes
1	GK	(Hong Kong)	Yapp Hung Fai																
2	DF	(Hong Kong)	Lee Chi Ho	2						1			1	1		4	1		
4	DF	(Hong Kong)	Sean Tse	1						1			1			3			
5	DF	(Hong Kong)	Chak Ting Fung	1			1									2			
7	FW	(Hong Kong)	Chan Siu Ki							1						1			
8	MF	(Brazil)	Ticão	2			2			1			1			6			
9	MF	(Hong Kong)	Lee Wai Lim										2			2			
10	MF	(Brazil)	João Emir	1			1									2			
11	FW	(Bosnia and Herzegovina)	Saša Kajkut	1				1		1			1			3	1		
14	MF	(Netherlands)	Vincent Weijl																
15	DF	(Hong Kong)	Chan Wai Ho							1			2			3			
16	MF	(Hong Kong)	Chan Siu Kwan	2												2			
17	MF	(Hong Kong)	Lee Hong Lim	1									1			2			
18	DF	(Hong Kong)	Kwok Kin Pong							2			1			3			
19	FW	(Brazil)	Dhiego Martins	2			1			1						4			
21	MF	(Hong Kong)	Leung Chun Pong										1			1			
22	DF	(Hong Kong)	Jack Sealy	2			1						2			5			
23	MF	(Canada) (Hong Kong)	Michael Luk	1	1											1	1		
24	MF	(Hong Kong)	Lo Kong Wai																
27	FW	(Australia)	Andrew Barisic	1						2			1			4			
37	DF	(South Korea)	Ko Kyung-Joon				1									1			
	GK	(China) (Hong Kong)	Zhang Chunhui	2												2			
	DF	(Brazil)	Joel	1												1			
	FW	(Guinea)	Mamadou Barry	1												1			
	MF	(Brazil)	Aender Naves	1												1			

Last updated: 13 April 2014
Source: Competitive matches
Ordered by (red card) , (second yellow card) and (yellow card)
(yellow card) = Number of bookings; (second yellow card) = Number of sending offs after a second yellow card; (red card) = Number of sending offs by a direct red card.

=== Substitution record ===
Includes all competitive matches.

			League		Shield		FA Cup		Continental		Total	
No.	Pos	Name	subson	subsoff	subson	subsoff	subson	subsoff	subson	subsoff	subson	subsoff
Goalkeepers
1	GK	Yapp Hung Fai	0	0	0	0	0	0	0	0	0	0
25	GK	Tin Man Ho	0	0	0	0	0	0	0	0	0	0
39	GK	Leung Hing Kit	0	0	0	0	0	0	0	0	0	0
	GK	Zhang Chunhui	0	0	0	0	0	0	0	0	0	0
Defenders
2	CB	Lee Chi Ho	0	1	0	0	0	0	0	1	0	2
4	CB	Sean Tse	2	3	0	1	0	1	0	0	2	5
5	FB	Chak Ting Fung	0	1	1	0	0	0	0	1	1	2
15	CB	Chan Wai Ho	3	0	1	1	0	0	0	0	4	1
18	LB	Kwok Kin Pong	1	1	0	0	0	0	0	1	1	2
20	LB	Liu Stephen Garlock	0	0	0	0	0	0	0	0	0	0
22	RB	Jack Sealy	2	1	0	1	0	0	1	0	3	2
37	CB	Ko Kyung-Joon	1	2	2	0	0	0	0	0	3	2
	CB	Joel	1	0	0	0	0	0	0	0	1	0
Midfielders
8	DM	Ticão	0	0	0	0	0	0	0	0	0	0
9	RM	Lee Wai Lim	2	5	2	0	0	0	2	3	6	8
10	AM	João Emir	3	2	1	0	0	0	1	0	5	2
13	CM	Law Chun Yan	0	0	0	0	0	0	0	0	0	0
14	LM	Vincent Weijl	0	2	0	2	0	1	0	0	0	5
16	CM	Chan Siu Kwan	1	2	0	0	0	0	2	0	3	2
17	LM	Lee Hong Lim	5	3	1	1	1	0	1	2	8	6
21	CM	Leung Chun Pong	1	3	0	0	0	1	0	2	1	6
23	CM	Michael Luk	4	0	0	0	1	0	2	0	7	0
24	LM	Lo Kong Wai	4	1	0	1	0	0	2	0	6	2
36	RM	Kouta Jige	0	0	0	0	0	0	0	0	0	0
	DM	Aender	1	2	0	0	0	0	0	0	1	2
Forwards
7	CF	Chan Siu Ki	3	0	0	0	2	0	0	3	5	3
11	CF	Saša Kajkut	1	0	0	0	0	1	1	2	2	3
19	SS	Dhiego Martins	1	3	1	1	1	1	0	0	3	5
27	CF	Andrew Barisic	0	2	0	0	0	0	0	0	0	2
31	CF	Cheng Lai Hin	0	3	0	1	0	0	3	0	3	4
	CF	Mamadou Barry	1	0	0	0	0	0	0	0	1	0

Last updated: 17 April 2014

=== Captains ===
No.	P	Name	Country	No. games	Notes
15	DF	Chan Wai Ho	(Hong Kong)	12	Captain
18	DF	Kwok Kin Pong	(Hong Kong)	11	1st Vice captain
2	DF	Lee Chi Ho	(Hong Kong)	2	2nd Vice captain

Last updated: 17 April 2014
Source: Competitive match reports.
Competitive matches only
Matches started as captain only
Country: FIFA nationality; No.: Squad number; P: Position; Name: Player name; No. Games: Number of games started as captain.

== Competitions ==
=== Overall ===
Competition	Started round	Current position / round	Final position / round	First match	Last match
Hong Kong First Division League	—	2nd		1 September 2013	10–11 May 2014
Senior Challenge Shield	Quarter-finals	—	Winner	6 December 2013	12 January 2014
FA Cup	Quarter-finals	—		January 2014	
AFC Champions League	Play-off stage	—	Play-off stage	2 February 2014	9 February 2014
AFC Cup	Group stage	Group stage		26 February 2014	

Updated to match played 15 February 2014
Source: Competitions

=== First Division League ===
==== Classification ====
Pos	Team	Pld	W	D	L	GF	GA	GD	Pts	Qualification or relegation
1	Kitchee (C)	18	15	3	0	47	12	+35	48	2015 AFC Champions League play-off stage
2	Sun Pegasus	18	10	2	6	40	28	+12	32	2013–14 Hong Kong season play-off
3	South China	18	8	8	2	35	24	+11	32	2015 AFC Cup (Note: South China won the 2013–14 Hong Kong season play-off and thus qualified for the 2015 AFC Cup group stage.)
4	Royal Southern (R)	18	5	6	7	25	32	−7	21	2013–14 Hong Kong season play-off and relegation to 2014–15 Hong Kong First Division League (Note: Since the 2013–14 Hong Kong Senior Challenge Shield winners (South China) would at this point qualify for the 2013–14 Hong Kong season play-off, the 4th placed team would qualify for the Season Play-off. At the same time, Royal Southern declined to participate in the 2014–15 Hong Kong Premier League and would self-relegate in the following season.)
5	Hong Kong Rangers	18	5	6	7	23	32	−9	21	

Updated to match(es) played on 11 May 2014. Source: Hong Kong Football Association
Rules for classification: 1) points; 2) head-to-head points; 3) head-to-head goal difference; 4) head-to-head goals scored; 5) goal difference; 6) number of goals scored.
(C) Champions; (R) Relegated

==== Results summary ====
Overall								Home						Away					
Pld	W	D	L	GF	GA	GD	Pts	W	D	L	GF	GA	GD	W	D	L	GF	GA	GD
14	6	7	1	25	18	+7	25	4	3	0	12	7	+5	2	4	1	13	11	+2

Last updated: 17 April 2014.
Source: First Division

==== Results by round ====
Round	1	2	3	4	5	6	7	8	9	10	11	12	13	14	15	16	17	18	19	20	21	22
Ground	H	A	H	H	H	A	A	H	H	A	A	H	H	H	A	A	A	A	A	A	H	H
Result	W	L	D	W	D	W	W	W	W	D	W	P	W	D	D							
Position (Note: South China's position at the end of the day in which their match was played)	2	3	4	3	3	2	1	2	2	2	2											

Updated to match(es) played on 8 March 2014. Source: Competitive Matches
A = Away; H = Home; W = Win; D = Draw; L = Loss; P = Postponed

== Matches ==
Win Draw Loss Void

=== Pre-season friendlies ===
18 July 2013	Guangdong Sunray Cave (China)	2 – 1	(Hong Kong) South China	Guangzhou, China PR
	Goal		Luk Chi Ho	Stadium: Sanshui Football Training Base

20 July 2013	Meixian Hakka (China)	1 – 0	(Hong Kong) South China	Guangzhou, China PR
	Goal			Stadium: Sanshui Football Training Base

7 August 2013	Wofoo Tai Po (Hong Kong)	1 – 1	(Hong Kong) South China	Tai Po, New Territories
20:00 UTC+8	Chen Liming 76'		59' Kwok Kin Pong	Stadium: Kwong Fuk Park

==== Premier League Asia Trophy ====
24 July 2013 Semi-finals	Manchester City (England)	1 – 0	(Hong Kong) South China	So Kon Po, Hong Kong
20:40^{1} UTC+8	Džeko 21'	Report		Stadium: Hong Kong Stadium (Capacity: 40,000); Attendance: 35,950; Referee: Anthony Taylor (England)

27 July 2013 3rd Place Playoff	Tottenham Hotspur (England)	6 – 0	(Hong Kong) South China	So Kon Po, Hong Kong
18:00 UTC+8	Tse 12' (o.g.); Dempsey 34'; Defoe 45', 54', 80'; Townsend 86'			Stadium: Hong Kong Stadium (Capacity: 40,000); Attendance: 39,544; Referee: Anthony Taylor (England); Assistant referees: Michael McDonough (England), Lam Chi Ho (Hong Kong); Fourth official: Liu Kwok Man (Hong Kong)

Remarks:
^{1} Match delayed by 10 minutes due to rain. Game reduced to 80 minutes (40 minute halves).

=== First Division League ===
1 September 2013 Round 1	South China	3 – 2	Southern	Mong Kok, Kowloon
17:30 UTC+8	Sealy (yellow card) 10'; Barry 48', 74' (pen.); Ticão (yellow card) 63'; Zhang Chunhui (yellow card) 81'; Tse 86'	Report	42' Carril; 61' Yago; (yellow card) 73' Lo Chi Kwan; (yellow card) 80' Héctor; (yellow card) 81' Rubén; (yellow card) 90+1' Ngan Lok Fung	Stadium: Mong Kok Stadium (Note: Due to bad pitch condition, the match will be played at Mong Kok Stadium instead of South China's home ground Hong Kong Stadium.) (Capacity: 6,680); Attendance: 2,566; Referee: Tong Kui Sum; Assistant referees: Chan Shui Hung, Yu Chun San; Fourth official: Sarao Amarjit Singh

14 September 2013 Round 2	Sun Pegasus	5 – 3	South China	Mong Kok, Kowloon
17:30 UTC+8	Miović 18', 61'; Ju Yingzhi 19'; Raščić 28', 73' (yellow card) 54'; Landon Ling (yellow card) 82'	Report	(yellow card) 8' Michael Luk; (yellow card) 11' Aender; 16', 23' Dhiego; 55' (pen.) Barry; (yellow card) 78' Chak Ting Fung	Stadium: Mong Kok Stadium (Capacity: 6,680); Attendance: 3,200; Referee: Ng Kai Lam; Assistant referees: Chow Chun Kit, Luk Kin Sun; Fourth official: Chan Shui Hung

21 September 2013 Round 3	South China	0 – 0	Kitchee	So Kon Po, Hong Kong Island
17:30 UTC+8	Joel (yellow card) 1'	Report	(yellow card) 35' Recio; (yellow card) 79' Dani	Stadium: Hong Kong Stadium (Capacity: 40,000); Attendance: 3,493; Referee: Tong Kui Sum; Assistant referees: Chow Chun Kit, Lam Nai Kei; Fourth official: Yu Chun Sun

28 September 2013 Round 4	South China	2 – 0	Sunray Cave JC Sun Hei	So Kon Po, Hong Kong Island
17:30 UTC+8	Chak Ting Fung 27'; Lo Kong Wai 59'	Report	(yellow card) 61' Kilama; (yellow card) 66' Reinaldo; (yellow card) 67' Mirko	Stadium: Hong Kong Stadium (Capacity: 40,000); Attendance: 1,397; Referee: Ng Chiu Kok; Assistant referees: Lam Chi Ho, Chan Ming Siu; Fourth official: Yu Kin Fung

5 October 2013 Round 5	South China	2 – 2	I-Sky Yuen Long	So Kon Po, Hong Kong Island
17:30 UTC+8	Cheng Lai Hin 49'; Dhiego 57'	Report	(yellow card) 40' Gustavo; 68' (yellow card) 69' Sandro; 90+1' (yellow card) 90+5' Marques; (yellow card) 90+4' Souza	Stadium: Hong Kong Stadium (Capacity: 40,000); Attendance: 1,402; Referee: Liu Kwok Man; Assistant referees: Ng Kai Lam, Sarao Amarjit Singh; Fourth official: Yu Chun Sun

20 October 2013 Round 6	Happy Valley	1 – 4 (Voided)	South China	Tai Po, New Territories
14:30 UTC+8	Acosta (yellow card) 20'; Choi Kwok Wai 28'; Chao Pengfei (yellow card) 89'	Report	36' Lee Wai Lim; 41' Lee Hong Lim; 64' Kwok Kin Pong; 90' (pen.) Barry	Stadium: Tai Po Sports Ground (Capacity: 3,000); Attendance: 1,492; Referee: Tong Kui Sum; Assistant referees: Cheng Oi Cho, Lau Fong Hei; Fourth official: Yau Tsz Yeung

27 October 2013 Round 7	Yokohama FC Hong Kong	1 – 2	South China	Tseung Kwan O, New Territories
17:30 UTC+8	Harada (yellow card) 22'; Leung Kwun Chung (yellow card) 57'; Liang Zicheng (yellow card) 78'; Fong Pak Lun (yellow card) 80'; Chak Ting Fung 84' (o.g.); Li Shu Yeung (red card) 90+4'	Report	(yellow card) 37' (yellow-red card) 59' Michael Luk; 60' Kwok Kin Pong; (yellow card) 90+1' Zhang Chunhui; 90+5' (pen.) Barry	Stadium: Tseung Kwan O Sports Ground (Capacity: 3,500); Attendance: 1,003; Referee: Ng Kai Lam; Assistant referees: Cheng Oi Cho, Lau Fong Hei; Fourth official: Tang Hing Fu

1 December 2013 Round 8	South China	2 – 0	Biu Chun Rangers	So Kon Po, Hong Kong Island
17:30 UTC+8	Ko Kyung-Joon 30'; Dhiego 34' (yellow card) 83'; Barry (yellow card) 40'; Lee Hong Lim (yellow card) 72'	Report	(yellow card) 31' Leung Hing Kit; (yellow card) 70' Lee Kil-Hoon	Stadium: Hong Kong Stadium (Capacity: 40,000); Attendance: 1,112; Referee: Cheng Oi Cho; Assistant referees: Yu Chun Sun, Yu Kin Fung; Fourth official: Lui Siu Chuen

15 December 2013 Round 9	South China	1 – 0 (Voided)	Tuen Mun	So Kon Po, Hong Kong Island
17:30 UTC+8	Lee Chi Ho 58' (yellow card) 80'	Report	(yellow card) 62' Tsang Chiu Tat; (yellow card) 69' Feng Tao	Stadium: Hong Kong Stadium (Capacity: 40,000); Attendance: 669; Referee: Tong Kui Sum; Assistant referees: Cheng Oi Cho, Tang Hing Fu; Fourth official: Law Bik Chi

5 January 2014 Round 10	Eastern Salon	0 – 0	South China	Mong Kok, Kowloon
14:30 UTC+8	Li Haiqiang (yellow card) 74'; Diego (yellow card) 84'; Man Pei Tek (yellow card) 90+3'	Report	(yellow card) 50' Chan Siu Kwan; (yellow card) 59' Ticão	Stadium: Mong Kok Stadium (Note: The match will be played at Mong Kok Stadium instead of Eastern Salon's home ground Shing Mun Valley Sports Ground.) (Capacity: 6,680); Attendance: 3,155; Referee: Ho Wai Sing; Assistant referees: Cheng Oi Cho, Yu Chun Sun; Fourth official: Lau Fong Hei

18 January 2014 Round 11	Citizen	1 – 4	South China	Mong Kok, Kowloon
17:30 UTC+8	Nakamura 25'	Report	(yellow card) 75' Sealy; 81' Lee Hong Lim; 82' Lee Chi Ho; 85' Weiji; 87' Kwok Kin Pong	Stadium: Mong Kok Stadium (Note: The match will be played at Mong Kok Stadium instead of Citizen's home ground Tsing Yi Sports Ground.) (Capacity: 6,680); Attendance: 2,090; Referee: Tong Kui Sum; Assistant referees: Chan Shui Hung, Tang Hing Fu; Fourth official: Yu Kin Fung

8 February 2014 Round 12	South China	Postponed (Note: As South China reach the second round of 2014 AFC Champions League qualifying play-off, they will face Thai Premier League club Chonburi on 9 February 2014 in Chonburi, Thailand. As a result, the match is postponed.)	Citizen	So Kon Po, Hong Kong Island
17:30 UTC+8				Stadium: Hong Kong Stadium (Capacity: 40,000)

15 February 2014 Round 13	South China	3 – 1	Yokohama FC Hong Kong	So Kon Po, Hong Kong Island
17:30 UTC+8	Kajkut (yellow card) 55' (goal) 64'; Sealy 89'; Barisic 90+2'	Report	45+1' Fukuda; (yellow card) 59' Wong Wai; (yellow card) 63' Leung Kwun Chung	Stadium: Hong Kong Stadium (Capacity: 40,000); Attendance: 961; Referee: Cheng Oi Cho; Assistant referees: Chow Chun Kit, Yau Ho Fai; Fourth official: Chan Ming Siu

22 February 2014 Round 14	South China	2 – 2	Sun Pegasus	So Kon Po, Hong Kong Island
17:30 UTC+8	Tse 5' (yellow card) 32'; Lee Chi Ho (yellow card) 28'; João Emir (yellow card) 40'; Kajkut 80'	Report	6' Raščić; (yellow card) 45+3' Mbome; 90+6' Ranđelović; (yellow card) 90+6' Cesar	Stadium: Hong Kong Stadium (Capacity: 40,000); Attendance: 1,632; Referee: Liu Kwok Man; Assistant referees: Lam Nai Kei, Lui Siu Chuen; Fourth official: Lau Fong Hei

9 March 2014 Round 15	I-Sky Yuen Long	2 – 2	South China	Yuen Long, New Territories
14:30 UTC+8	Sandro 5', 76'; Marques (yellow card) 43'; Gustavo (yellow card) 90+4'	Report	9' (yellow card) 67' Barisic; 23' (yellow card) 89' Dhiego	Stadium: Yuen Long Stadium (Capacity: 4,932); Attendance: 1,567; Referee: Ho Wai Sing; Assistant referees: Luk Kin Sun, Yu Chun Sun; Fourth official: Tang Hing Fu

15 March 2014 Round 16	Sunray Cave JC Sun Hei	Postponed	South China	Tsing Yi, New Territories
17:30 UTC+8				Stadium: Tsing Yi Sports Ground (Capacity: 1,500)

22 March 2014 Round 17	Tuen Mun	Cancelled	South China	Tuen Mun, New Territories
14:30 UTC+8				Stadium: Tuen Mun Tang Shiu Kin Sports Ground (Capacity: 2,200)

29 March 2014 Round 18	Biu Chun Rangers	P – P	South China	Sham Shui Po, Kowloon
14:30 UTC+8				Stadium: Sham Shui Po Sports Ground (Capacity: 2,194)

5 April 2014 Round 19	Royal Southern	1 – 1	South China	Aberdeen, Hong Kong Island
12:30 UTC+8	Chung Hon Chee (yellow card) 28'; Yago (yellow card) 70'; Chow Ka Wa 71'; Carril (yellow card) 72'	Report	20' Weijl; (yellow card) 87' Chan Siu Kwan	Stadium: Aberdeen Sports Ground (Capacity: 4,000); Attendance: 512; Referee: Ng Chiu Kok; Assistant referees: Yau Ho Fai, Sarao Amarjit Singh; Fourth official: Lui Siu Chuen

17 April 2014 Round 20	Kitchee	1 – 1	South China	Mong Kok, Kowloon
20:00 UTC+8	Wan Chun (yellow card) 12'; Cheung Kin Fung (yellow card) 35'; Tsang Kam To (yellow card) 64'; Cascón 74' (pen.); Matt Lam (yellow card) 80'	Report	62' (pen.) Dhiego	Stadium: Mong Kok Stadium (Capacity: 6,680); Attendance: 1,767; Referee: Tong Kui Sum; Assistant referees: Cheng Oi Cho, Luk Kin Sun; Fourth official: Tang Hing Fu

3 May 2014 Round 21	South China	v	Eastern Salon	So Kon Po, Hong Kong Island
14:30 UTC+8				Stadium: Hong Kong Stadium (Capacity: 40,000)

6 May 2014 Round 16R	Sunray Cave JC Sun Hei	v	South China	Tsing Yi, New Territories
14:30 UTC+8				Stadium: Tsing Yi Sports Ground (Capacity: 1,500)

10–11 May 2014 Round 22	South China	Cancelled	Happy Valley	So Kon Po, Hong Kong Island
TBC				Stadium: Hong Kong Stadium (Capacity: 40,000)

=== Senior Shield ===
6 December 2013 Quarter-finals	South China	3 – 1	Biu Chun Rangers	Mong Kok, Kowloon
20:00 UTC+8	João Emir (yellow card) 22' (goal) 49'; Sealy (yellow card) 26'; Dhiego 90+1' (pen.); Lee Wai Lim 90+3'	Report	(yellow card) 35' (goal) 61' Schutz; (yellow card) 58' Lee Kil-Hoon; (yellow card) 72' Lai Ka Fai	Stadium: Mong Kok Stadium (Capacity: 6,680); Attendance: 1,449; Referee: Lui Siu Chuen; Assistant referees: Luk Kin Sun, Fok Pong Shing; Fourth official: Tang Hing Fu

25 December 2013 Semi-finals	Eastern Salon	2 – 3 (a.e.t.)	South China	Mong Kok, Kowloon
15:00 UTC+8	Tse Man Wing (yellow card) 11'; Paulo (yellow card) 61'; Itaparica (yellow card) 81'; Beto 88'; Leung Chi Wing (yellow card) 102'; Wong Chin Hung 117'	Report	6' João Emir; (yellow card) 61' Ko Kyung-Joon; (yellow card) 87' (goal) 107' Ticão; (yellow card) 95' Dhiego; 105+1' Lee Wai Lim	Stadium: Mong Kok Stadium (Capacity: 6,680); Attendance: 4,628; Referee: Liu Kwok Man; Assistant referees: Luk Kin Sun, Lam Nai Kei; Fourth official: Tang Hing Fu

12 January 2014 Final	Sun Pegasus	1 – 2	South China	So Kon Po, Hong Kong Island
16:00 UTC+8	McKee 12'; Cesar (yellow card) 30'; Bai He (yellow card) 37'; Deng Jinghuang (yellow card) 47'; Raščić (yellow card) 48'; Mbome (yellow card) 77'	Report	(yellow card) 59' Chak Ting Fung; (yellow card) 60' Ticão; 70' (yellow card) 42' (yellow-red card) 81' Kajkut; 74' Barisic	Stadium: Hong Kong Stadium (Capacity: 40,000); Attendance: 6,820; Referee: Ng Chiu Kok; Assistant referees: Lam Nai Kei, Lam Chi Ho; Fourth official: Ho Wai Sing; Man of the Match: Andrew Barisic (South China)

=== FA Cup ===
25 March 2014 Round of 16	South China	3 – 2	Sun Pegasus	Mong Kok, Kowloon
20:00 (UTC+8)	Tse (yellow card) 37'; Kajkut (yellow card) 45+2' (goal) 71' (pen.); Kwok Kin Pong (yellow card) 52'; Barisic 52', 90+2' (yellow card) 72'	Report	10' (yellow card) 75' Ju Yingzhi; 19' McKee; (yellow card) 37' Mbome; (yellow card) 49' Tong Kin Man; (yellow card) 75' So Wai Chuen	Stadium: Mong Kok Stadium (Capacity: 6,680); Attendance: 2,055; Referee: Tong Kui Sum; Assistant referees: Chow Chun Kit, Lam Chi Ho; Fourth official: Luk Kin Sun

13 April 2014 Quarter-finals	South China	0 – 0 (a.e.t.) (1 – 3 p)	Kitchee	Mong Kok, Kowloon
17:30 UTC+8	Lee Chi Ho (yellow card) 30'; Chan Siu Ki (yellow card) 77'; Ticão (yellow card) 83'; Dhiego (yellow card) 87'; Barisic (yellow card) 100'; Kwok Kin Pong (yellow card) 110'; Chan Wai Ho (yellow card) 115'	Report	(yellow card) 31' Xu Deshuai; (yellow card) 84' Alex; (yellow card) 105' Cascón	Stadium: Mong Kok Stadium (Capacity: 6,680); Attendance: 3,125; Referee: Ng Chiu Kok; Assistant referees: Lam Nai Kei, Chan Shui Hung; Fourth official: Lau Fong Hei
	Penalties
	Barisic (penalty scored); Weijl (penalty missed); Lee Hong Lim (penalty missed); Ticão (penalty missed)		(penalty scored) Cascón; (penalty scored) Jordi; (penalty missed) Jang Kyung-Jin; (penalty scored) Annan

=== 2014 AFC Champions League ===
==== Qualifying play-off ====
2 February 2014 Round 1	Tampines Rovers (Singapore)	1 – 2 (a.e.t.)	(Hong Kong) South China	Kallang, Singapore
19:30 UTC+8	Mustafić (yellow card) 8'; Imran Sahib (yellow card) 11' (yellow-red card) 34'; Mrdaković (yellow card) 40' (yellow-red card) 113' (goal) 64'; González (yellow card) 92'; Đurić (yellow card) 97'	Report	(yellow card) 10' Leung Chun Pong; 20', 113' Barisic; (yellow card) 118' Sealy	Stadium: Jalan Besar Stadium (Capacity: 8,000); Attendance: 1,192; Referee: Jumpei Iida (Japan); Assistant referees: Haruhiro Otsuka (Japan), Satoshi Karakami (Japan); Fourth official: Hiroyuki Kimura (Japan)

9 February 2014 Round 2	Chonburi (Thailand)	3 – 0	(Hong Kong) South China	Chonburi, Thailand
18:30 UTC+7	On-Mo 19'; Cunha 37', 55'; Kushida (yellow card) 67'	Report	(yellow card) 9' Chan Wai Ho; (yellow card) 22' Lee Chi Ho; (yellow card) 57' Kwok Kin Pong; (yellow card) 80' Ticão	Stadium: Chonburi Municipality Stadium (Capacity: 8,500); Referee: Peter Green (Australia); Assistant referees: Brad Hobson (Australia), David Walsh (Australia); Fourth official: Jarred Gillett (Australia)

South China failed to qualify for the group stage and automatically qualify for the 2014 AFC Cup group stage.

=== 2014 AFC Cup ===
==== Group stage ====
Team	Pld	W	D	L	GF	GA	GD	Pts	VNB	YAN	SCA	KEL
(Vietnam) Vissai Ninh Bình	6	5	1	0	18	7	+11	16		3–2	1–1	4–0
(Myanmar) Yangon United	6	3	0	3	16	17	−1	9	1–4		2–0	5–3
(Hong Kong) South China	6	2	1	3	11	11	0	7	1–3	5–3		4–0
(Malaysia) Kelantan	6	1	0	5	9	19	−10	3	2–3	2–3	2–0	

Legend: Blue = home team win; Yellow = draw; Red = away team win.

26 February 2014 Matchday 1	South China (Hong Kong)	1 – 3	(Vietnam) Vissai Ninh Bình	So Kon Po, Hong Kong
20:00 UTC+8	Lee Hong Lim (yellow card) 21'; Chan Siu Ki 58'	Report	(yellow card) 3' Lê Quang Hùng; 12' Bryan; 26' Đinh Văn Ta; 50' Tambwe	Stadium: Hong Kong Stadium (Capacity: 40,000); Attendance: 2,188; Referee: Hettikamkanamge Perera (Sri Lanka); Assistant referees: Priyanga Palliya Guruge (Sri Lanka), Alahapperuma Pathmasiri Dias (Sri Lanka); Fourth official: Nivon Robesh Gamini (Sri Lanka)

12 March 2014 Matchday 2	Kelantan (Malaysia)	2 – 0	(Hong Kong) South China	Kota Bharu, Malaysia
20:45 UTC+8	Wan Zaharulnizam 72'; Ghaddar 84'	Report		Stadium: Sultan Mohammad IV Stadium (Capacity: 22,000); Attendance: 4,564; Referee: Sukhbir Singh (Singapore); Assistant referees: Lim Kok Heng (Singapore), Li Ziliang (Singapore); Fourth official: Ahmed Shifan Abdul Raheem (Maldives)

18 March 2014 Matchday 3	Yangon United (Myanmar)	2 – 0	(Hong Kong) South China	Yangon, Myanmar
16:00 UTC+6:30	César 36'; Luiz 77'; Pyaye Phyo Aung (yellow card) 90+4'	Report	(yellow card) 21' Lee Wai Lim; (yellow card) 39' Tse; (yellow card) 57' (yellow-red card) 88' Lee Chi Ho; (yellow card) 61' Sealy; (yellow card) 84' Barisic	Stadium: Thuwunna Stadium (Capacity: 50,000); Attendance: 2,000; Referee: Sivakorn Pu-udom (Thailand); Assistant referees: Thanom Borikut (Thailand), Chumpol Deeplang (Thailand); Fourth official: Mongkolchai Pechsri (Thailand)

2 April 2014 Matchday 4	South China (Hong Kong)	5 – 3	(Myanmar) Yangon United	Mong Kok, Hong Kong
20:00 UTC+8	Michael Luk 8'; Kajkut 15', 36' (yellow card) 48'; Lee Wai Lim (yellow card) 24'; Chan Siu Ki 56'; Lee Hong Lim 61'; Chan Wai Ho (yellow card) 75'	Report	(yellow card) 11' Yoshino; (yellow card) 13' Aung Zaw; 21' Kyaw Ko Ko; 45+1' David Htan; (yellow card) 64' Yan Aung Kyaw; (yellow card) 76' César	Stadium: Mong Kok Stadium (Note: The match will be played at Mong Kok Stadium instead of South China's home ground Hong Kong Stadium.) (Capacity: 6,680); Attendance: 1,183; Referee: Jameel Abdulhusin (Bahrain); Assistant referees: Mohamed Jaafar Mohamed Salman (Bahrain), Ahmed Jaber Mubarak (Bahrain); Fourth official: Saleh Abdullah M Alhethlol (Saudi Arabia)

8 April 2014 Matchday 5	Vissai Ninh Bình (Vietnam)	1 – 1	(Hong Kong) South China	Ninh Bình, Vietnam
17:00 UTC+7		Report	30' Kajkut; (yellow card) 34' Tse	Stadium: Ninh Bình Stadium (Capacity: 22,000); Referee: Rowan Arumughan (India); Assistant referees: Magho Moirangthem Singh (India), Sapam Kennedy (India); Fourth official: Banerjee Pranjal (India)

22 April 2014 Matchday 6	South China (Hong Kong)	v	(Malaysia) Kelantan	Mong Kok, Hong Kong
20:00 UTC+8	Lee Hong Lim 43'	Report	(yellow card) 10' Faiz; (yellow card) 35' Nazri	Stadium: Mong Kok Stadium (Capacity: 6,680)
