= 2013 Hong Kong–Shanghai Inter Club Championship =

- Event: Hong Kong–Shanghai Inter Club Championship
Shanghai Dongya	South China
2 (7)	2 (6)

First leg
Shanghai Dongya	South China
2	1
- Date: 5 November 2012
- Venue: Yuanshen Sports Centre Stadium, Shanghai
- Weather: Partly cloudy 22 °C (72 °F); 70% humidity

Second leg
South China	Shanghai Dongya
1	0
- 2–2 after 90 minutes and extra time; Shanghai Dongya won 7–6 on penalties.
- Date: 8 November 2012
- Venue: Mong Kok Stadium, Hong Kong
- Referee: Ng Chiu Kok
- Weather: Clear; 23 °C (73 °F); 78% humidity

The 2013 Hong Kong–Shanghai Inter Club Championship was held on 5 November and 8 November 2012. The first leg will be played at Shanghai Stadium, Shanghai, China PR, with the second leg taken place at Mong Kok Stadium, Mong Kok, Hong Kong.

Current defending champions of Hong Kong First Division League South China was selected to represent Hong Kong while Chinese Super League club Shanghai Tellace represents Shanghai.

Shanghai Dongya won 2–1 at home but was defeated by 0–1 in Hong Kong. Match ended in 2–2 after 90 minutes and extra time. Liu Stephen Garlock's penalty miss in the seventh round crowned Shanghai Dongya the champions of 2013 Hong Kong–Shanghai Inter Club Championship.

== Squads ==
=== Shanghai Dongya ===
No.	Pos.	Player	Date of birth (age)	Caps	Club
1	GK	(China) Yan Junling	28 January 1991 (aged 22)		(China) Shanghai Dongya
3	DF	(China) Wu Yuyin	8 January 1990 (aged 23)		(China) Shanghai Dongya
6	MF	(China) Cai Huikang	10 October 1989 (aged 24)		(China) Shanghai Dongya
11	DF	(China) Fu Huan	12 July 1993 (aged 20)		(China) Shanghai Dongya
13	FW	(China) Zheng Dalun	11 February 1994 (aged 19)		(China) Shanghai Dongya
15	FW	(China) Lin Chuangyi	28 January 1993 (aged 20)		(China) Shanghai Dongya
16	DF	(China) Geng Jiaqi	1 July 1993 (aged 20)		(China) Shanghai Dongya
17	DF	(China) Ji Xiaoxuan	19 March 1993 (aged 20)		(China) Shanghai Dongya
19	FW	(China) Li Shenglong	27 January 1993 (aged 20)		(China) Shanghai Dongya
20	FW	(China) Mao Jiakang	17 January 1991 (aged 22)		(China) Shanghai Dongya
24	GK	(China) Dong Jialin	6 April 1993 (aged 20)		(China) Shanghai Dongya
41	DF	(China) He Guan	25 January 1993 (aged 20)		(China) Shanghai Dongya
42	DF	(China) Yang Shiyuan	11 March 1994 (aged 19)		(China) Shanghai Dongya
45	MF	(China) Zhang Yi	17 August 1993 (aged 20)		(China) Shanghai Dongya
46	DF	(China) Zhang Wei	28 March 1993 (aged 20)		(China) Shanghai Dongya
47	MF	(China) Li Jiawei	5 January 1993 (aged 20)		(China) Shanghai Dongya
48	MF	(China) Li Haowen	29 November 1993 (aged 19)		(China) Shanghai Dongya
53	MF	(China) Yun Zhihai	25 January 1993 (aged 20)		(China) Shanghai Dongya
56	FW	(China) Hu Jinghang	23 March 1997 (aged 16)		(China) Shanghai Dongya

=== South China ===
No.	Pos.	Player	Date of birth (age)	Caps	Club
1	GK	(Hong Kong) Yapp Hung Fai	21 March 1990 (aged 23)		(Hong Kong) South China
2	DF	(Hong Kong) Lee Chi Ho	16 November 1982 (aged 30)		(Hong Kong) South China
4	DF	(Hong Kong) Sean Tse	3 May 1992 (aged 21)		(Hong Kong) South China
5	DF	(Hong Kong) Chak Ting Fung	27 November 1989 (aged 23)		(Hong Kong) South China
6	DF	(Brazil) Joel Bertoti Padilha	24 July 1980 (aged 33)		(Hong Kong) South China
8	MF	(Brazil) Ticão	7 February 1985 (aged 28)		(Hong Kong) South China
9	MF	(Hong Kong) Lee Wai Lim	5 May 1981 (aged 32)		(Hong Kong) South China
10	MF	(Brazil) João Emir Porto Pereira	17 March 1989 (aged 24)		(Hong Kong) South China
11	MF	(Brazil) Aender Naves Mesquita	12 February 1983 (aged 30)		(Hong Kong) South China
15	DF	(Hong Kong) Chan Wai Ho	24 April 1982 (aged 31)		(Hong Kong) South China
16	MF	(Hong Kong) Chan Siu Kwan	1 August 1992 (aged 21)		(Hong Kong) South China
17	MF	(Hong Kong) Lee Hong Lim	29 September 1983 (aged 30)		(Hong Kong) South China
18	DF	(Hong Kong) Kwok Kin Pong	30 March 1987 (aged 26)		(Hong Kong) South China
20	DF	(Australia) Liu Stephen Garlock	18 May 1992 (aged 21)		(Hong Kong) South China
22	DF	(Hong Kong) Jack Sealy	4 May 1987 (aged 26)		(Hong Kong) South China
23	MF	(Hong Kong) Michael Luk	22 August 1986 (aged 27)		(Hong Kong) South China
24	MF	(Hong Kong) Lo Kong Wai	19 June 1992 (aged 21)		(Hong Kong) South China
25	GK	(Hong Kong) Tin Man Ho	5 March 1990 (aged 23)		(Hong Kong) South China
28	GK	(Hong Kong) Zhang Chunhui	14 March 1983 (aged 30)		(Hong Kong) South China
29	FW	(Guinea) Mamadou Barry	16 May 1982 (aged 31)		(Hong Kong) South China
31	FW	(Hong Kong) Cheng Lai Hin	31 March 1986 (aged 27)		(Hong Kong) South China
37	DF	(South Korea) Ko Kyung-Joon	7 March 1987 (aged 26)		(Hong Kong) South China

== Match details ==
=== 1st leg ===
5 November 2013
20:00 GMT+8

Shanghai Tellace	2 – 1	South China
Chan Siu Kwan 17' (o.g.); Li Shenglong 61'	Report	26' Barry

Yuanshen Sports Centre Stadium, Shanghai

=== 2nd leg ===
8 November 2013
20:00 GMT+8

South China	1 – 0 (a.e.t.)	Shanghai Dongya
Barry 36'	Report
Penalties
Aender (penalty scored); Cheng Lai Hin (penalty scored); Ko Kyung-Joon (penalty scored); Kwok Kin Pong (penalty scored); Sealy (penalty scored); Lee Chi Ho (penalty scored); Liu Stephen Garlock (penalty missed)	6 – 7	(penalty scored) Zhang Yi; (penalty scored) Mao Jiakang; (penalty scored) Zhang Wei; (penalty scored) Dong Jialin; (penalty scored) Wu Yuyin; (penalty scored) Zheng Dalun; (penalty scored) Hu Jinghang

Mong Kok Stadium, Hong Kong
Attendance: 1,872
Referee: Ng Chiu Kok (Hong Kong)
