= List of Hong Kong football transfers winter 2013–14 =

This is a list of Hong Kong football transfers for the 2013–14 winter transfer window. Only moves featuring at least one First Division club are listed.

The 2013–14 winter transfer window for Hong Kong football transfers opened on 2 January and closed on 29 January. Additionally, players without a club could join at any time before 29 March.

This list also includes transfers featuring at least one First Division club which were completed after the end of the summer 2013 transfer window and before the end of the 2013–14 winter window.

== Transfers ==
All players and clubs without a flag are Hongkonger.

Date	Name	Moving from	Moving to	Fee
12 November 2013	(Pakistan) Zesh Rehman	Kitchee	(Malaysia) Pahang FA	Free
22 November 2013	Emmet Wan	Free agent	Kitchee	Free
4 December 2013	(South Korea) Kim Dong-Ryeol	Sun Pegasus	Free agent	Mutual Consent
5 December 2013	(Netherlands) Vincent Weijl	Free agent	South China	Free
7 December 2013	Ng Siu Fai	Free agent	Sun Pegasus	Free
7 December 2013	Ko Chun	Wing Yee	Sun Pegasus	Undisclosed
7 December 2013	Zhang Jun	(China) Meizhou Keija	Sunray Cave JC Sun Hei	Free
11 December 2013	(South Korea) Lee Kil-Hoon	Biu Chun Rangers	(Malaysia) Penang FA	Free
20 December 2013	Li Ling Fung	Tai Chung	Happy Valley	Undisclosed
20 December 2013	(Equatorial Guinea) Iván Zarandona	(Spain) Noja	Happy Valley	Undisclosed
20 December 2013	(Equatorial Guinea) Chupe	(Hungary) Kazincbarcikai	Happy Valley	Undisclosed
20 December 2013	(Croatia) Tino Lagator	(Croatia) Solin	Happy Valley	Undisclosed
20 December 2013	Yan Pak Long	Happy Valley	Free agent	Released
20 December 2013	Tai Sze Chung	Happy Valley	Free agent	Released
20 December 2013	(Democratic Republic of the Congo) Muenyi Muana Lukalu	Happy Valley	Free agent	Released
20 December 2013	(Argentina) Jonathan Leonel Acosta	Happy Valley	Free agent	Released
20 December 2013	(Paraguay) Pablo Leguizamón Arce	Happy Valley	Free agent	Released
20 December 2013	(Argentina) Leonardo Abálsamo	Happy Valley	Free agent	Released
23 December 2013	(China) Li Ming	Tuen Mun	Free agent	Released
27 December 2013	(Australia) Jordan Elsey	(Australia) Adelaide United	Kitchee	Loan
27 December 2013	(Brazil) Aender Naves Mesquita	South China	Biu Chun Rangers	Loan
30 December 2013	(Australia) Marko Jesic	(Australia) Newcastle Jets	Sun Pegasus	Free
30 December 2013	Bai He	Sun Pegasus	(China) Shijiazhuang Yongchang	$100k
30 December 2013	Wong Yim Kwan	Happy Valley	Sun Pegasus	Undisclosed
30 December 2013	(China) Hu Jun	Tuen Mun	Free agent	Released
30 December 2013	(China) Yin Guangjun	Tuen Mun	Free agent	Released
30 December 2013	Wei Zhao	Tuen Mun	Free agent	Released
31 December 2013	Chan Siu Ki	(China) Guangdong Sunray Cave	South China	Free
31 December 2013	Leung Chun Pong	(China) Guangdong Sunray Cave	South China	Free
31 December 2013	(Bosnia and Herzegovina) Saša Kajkut	(Bosnia and Herzegovina) Čelik Zenica	South China	Free
31 December 2013	(Australia) Andrew Barisic	(Australia) Melbourne Knights	South China	Free
31 December 2013	Lee Chi Ho	South China	(China) Beijing Guoan	Loan return
1 January 2014	Yip Tsz Chun	Tuen Mun	Sun Pegasus	Undisclosed
1 January 2014	Wong Chi Chung	Tuen Mun	Eastern Salon	Undisclosed
1 January 2014	Leung Man Lai	Happy Valley	Eastern Salon	Undisclosed
1 January 2014	Li Ka Chun	Biu Chun Rangers	Eastern Salon	Undisclosed
1 January 2014	Lai Yiu Cheong	Tuen Mun	Biu Chun Rangers	Loan return
1 January 2014	Lai Yiu Cheong	Biu Chun Rangers	Sunray Cave JC Sun Hei	Loan
2 January 2014	James Ha	Sunray Cave JC Sun Hei	Kitchee	Loan return
3 January 2014	Lee Chi Ho	(China) Beijing Guoan	South China	Undisclosed
3 January 2014	Lau Nim Yat	Eastern Salon	Free agent	Released
4 January 2014	(China) Li Jian	Biu Chun Rangers	Happy Valley	Loan
6 January 2014	(Australia) Jordan Elsey	Kitchee	(Australia) Adelaide United	Loan return
6 January 2014	(Guinea) Mamadou Barry	South China	(Malaysia) Terengganu	Free
6 January 2014	Yuan Yang	Tuen Mun	Sun Pegasus	Loan return
6 January 2014	(Brazil) Joel Bertoti Padilha	South China	Biu Chun Rangers	Loan
6 January 2014	(South Korea) Jang Kyung-Jin	(South Korea) Ulsan Hyundai Mipo	Kitchee	Free
10 January 2014	(China) Liang Zicheng	Yokohama FC Hong Kong	Eastern Salon	$15k
13 January 2014	(Australia) Dylan Macallister	(Australia) Melbourne Heart	Eastern Salon	Undisclosed
14 January 2014	Zhang Chunhui	South China	Free agent	Contract terminated
14 January 2014	Leung Hing Kit	Biu Chun Rangers	South China	Loan
15 January 2014	Cheng Ting Chi	Free agent	Tuen Mun	Free
15 January 2014	Yan Pak Long	Free agent	Tuen Mun	Free
15 January 2014	Lau Yip Wa	Free agent	Tuen Mun	Free
15 January 2014	Ip Kwok Hei	Free agent	Tuen Mun	Free
17 January 2014	James Ha	Kitchee	Royal Southern	Loan
17 January 2014	Pak Wing Chak	Eastern Salon	Royal Southern	Loan
20 January 2014	(Japan) Yuki Fujimoto	Free agent	I-Sky Yuen Long	Free
22 January 2014	Li Ngai Hoi	Royal Southern	Kitchee	Loan Return
22 January 2014	Li Ngai Hoi	Kitchee	(China) Changchun Yatai	Undisclosed
26 January 2014	(Spain) Diego Cascón	(Spain) Jaén	Kitchee	Undisclosed
27 January 2014	(Australia) Steve Hayes	(Australia) South Coast Wolves	Biu Chun Rangers	Free
27 January 2014	(Japan) Masaaki Ideguchi	(Japan) Yokohama F.C.	Yokohama FC Hong Kong	Loan
28 January 2014	Tsang Chiu Tat	Tuen Mun	Royal Southern	Undisclosed
29 January 2014	Zhang Chunhui	Free agent	Royal Southern	Free
29 January 2014	Pang Tsz Kin	Happy Valley	I-Sky Yuen Long	Undisclosed
31 January 2014	(Japan) Shintaro Harada	Yokohama FC Hong Kong	(United States) Dayton Dutch Lions	Loan Return
4 February 2014	(Spain) José María Díaz Muñoz	(Thailand) Roi Et United	Royal Southern	Free
8 March 2014	Choi Kwok Wai	Happy Valley	Sun Pegasus	Free
8 March 2014	(China) Li Jian	Happy Valley	Sun Pegasus	Free
