= Stephen Garlock Liu =

Australian footballer (born 1992)

Liu Stephen Garlock
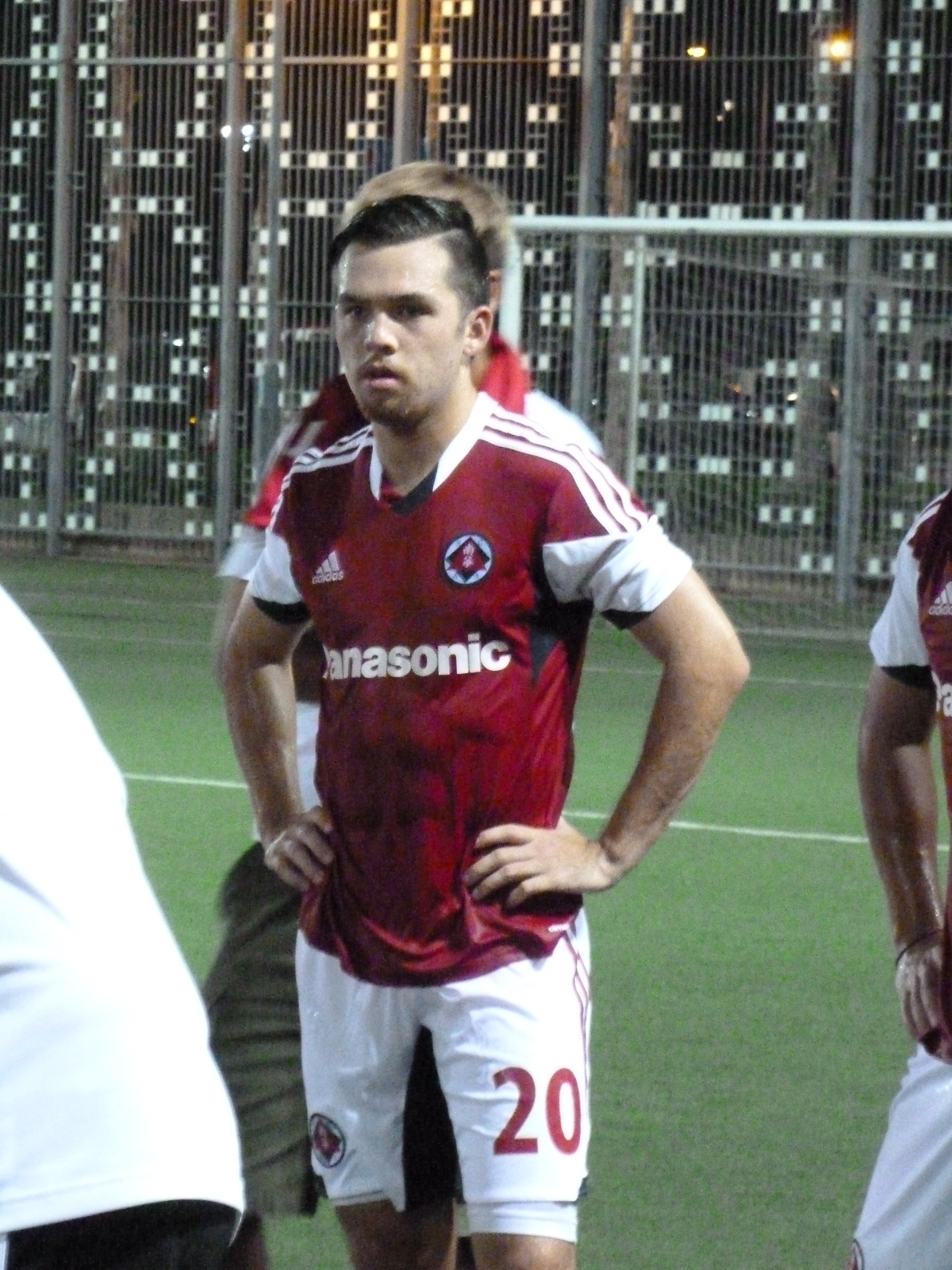

Personal information
- Full name: Liu Stephen Garlock
- Date of birth: 18 May 1992 (age 34)
- Place of birth: Sydney, Australia
- Height: 1.73 m (5 ft 8 in)
- Position: Left back

Team information
- Current team: HKFC

Youth career
- 2007–2009: Komazawa

Senior career*
Years	Team	Apps	(Gls)
2009–2012	HKFC	13	(0)
2013	Yokohama FC Hong Kong	0	(0)
2013–2014	South China	0	(0)
2018–2022	HKFC	22	(1)
- * Club domestic league appearances and goals as of 1 August 2022 ‡ National team caps and goals as of 4 June 2013

Liu Stephen Garlock (Chinese: 廖家樂; Jyutping: liu^{6} gaa^{1} lok^{6}; born 18 May 1992), also known as Stephen Liu, is a former Australian professional footballer who played as a full back. He is also of Irish and Hong Kong descent.

== Club career ==
=== Early career ===
Stephen was born in Sydney, Australia to a Chinese father and an Irish mother. He started playing football when he was young, growing up in Australia. He moved to Japan when he was 7 years old. He joined FC Komazawa in 2007, where he was still playing as a midfielder or striker. He left the club in 2009 as he moved to Hong Kong.

=== HKFC ===
Stephen joined HKFC in the 2009–10 season. He was part of the team which was promoted to the First Division at the end of that season.

He started playing in a professional football league with HKFC in the 2010–11 season. He featured 8 league games in the season but failed to help the team avoid relegation to the Second Division. He stayed at the club competing in the Second Division.

=== Yokohama FC Hong Kong ===
Stephen joined First Division club Yokohama FC Hong Kong in January 2013. However, he was only featured in Reserve Division matches after he joined the club, and was on the bench twice in the First Division.

=== South China ===
Stephen joined defending First Division champions South China for an undisclosed fee on 2 July 2013.

== Career statistics ==
=== Club ===
As of 4 May 2013

Club	Season	Division	League		Senior Shield		League Cup		FA Cup		AFC Cup		Others^{1}		Total	
Club	Season	Division	Apps	Goals	Apps	Goals	Apps	Goals	Apps	Goals	Apps	Goals	Apps	Goals	Apps	Goals
Hong Kong FC	2009–10	Second Division	3	0	—^{2}		N/A	N/A	N/A	N/A	N/A	N/A	N/A	N/A	3	0
Hong Kong FC	2010–11	First Division	8	0	1	0	2	0	0	0	N/A	N/A	N/A	N/A	11	0
Hong Kong FC	2011–12	Second Division	2	0	0^{3}	0^{3}	0	0	0	0	N/A	N/A	N/A	N/A	2	0
Hong Kong FC	2012–13	Second Division	0	0	2^{3}	0^{3}	0	0	0	0	N/A	N/A	N/A	N/A	2	0
Hong Kong FC Total			13	0	3	0	2	0	0	0	0	0	0	0	18	0
Yokohama FC Hong Kong	2012–13	First Division	0	0	0	0	—	—	0	0	N/A	N/A	N/A	N/A	0	0
Yokohama FC Hong Kong Total			0	0	0	0	0	0	0	0	0	0	0	0	0	0
South China	2013–14	First Division	0	0	0	0	—	—	0	0	0	0	N/A	N/A	0	0
South China Total			0	0	0	0	0	0	0	0	0	0	0	0	0	0
Total			13	0	3	0	2	0	0	0	0	0	0	0	18	0

== Notes ==
1. Others include Hong Kong season play-offs.
2. Hong Kong Junior Challenge Shield was not held in the 2009–10 season.
3. Since Hong Kong FC was competing in lower divisions, they could only join the Junior Shield instead of Senior Shield.
