= Jovo Pavlović =

Australian-Serbian soccer player

Personal information
- Date of birth: 16 August 1989 (age 37)
- Place of birth: Perth, Australia
- Height: 1.88 m (6 ft 2 in)
- Position: Defender

Youth career
- Bayswater City

Senior career*
Years	Team	Apps	(Gls)
2006	Bayswater City		
2007–2012	Floreat Athena		
2012–2013	Borac Banja Luka		
2013	Mitra Kukar	9	(1)
2013	South China	1	(0)
2014	Stirling Lions	14	(0)
2015	Inglewood United	21	(0)
2016	Stirling Lions	4	(0)
- * Club domestic league appearances and goals as of 25.9.14

Jovo Pavlović (born 16 August 1989) in Perth is an Australian-Serbian football player who is currently playing for Stirling Lions. He previously played for Mitra Kukar in Indonesia Super League, and Hong Kong First Division League club South China.
