= Law Chun Yan =

Hong Kong footballer

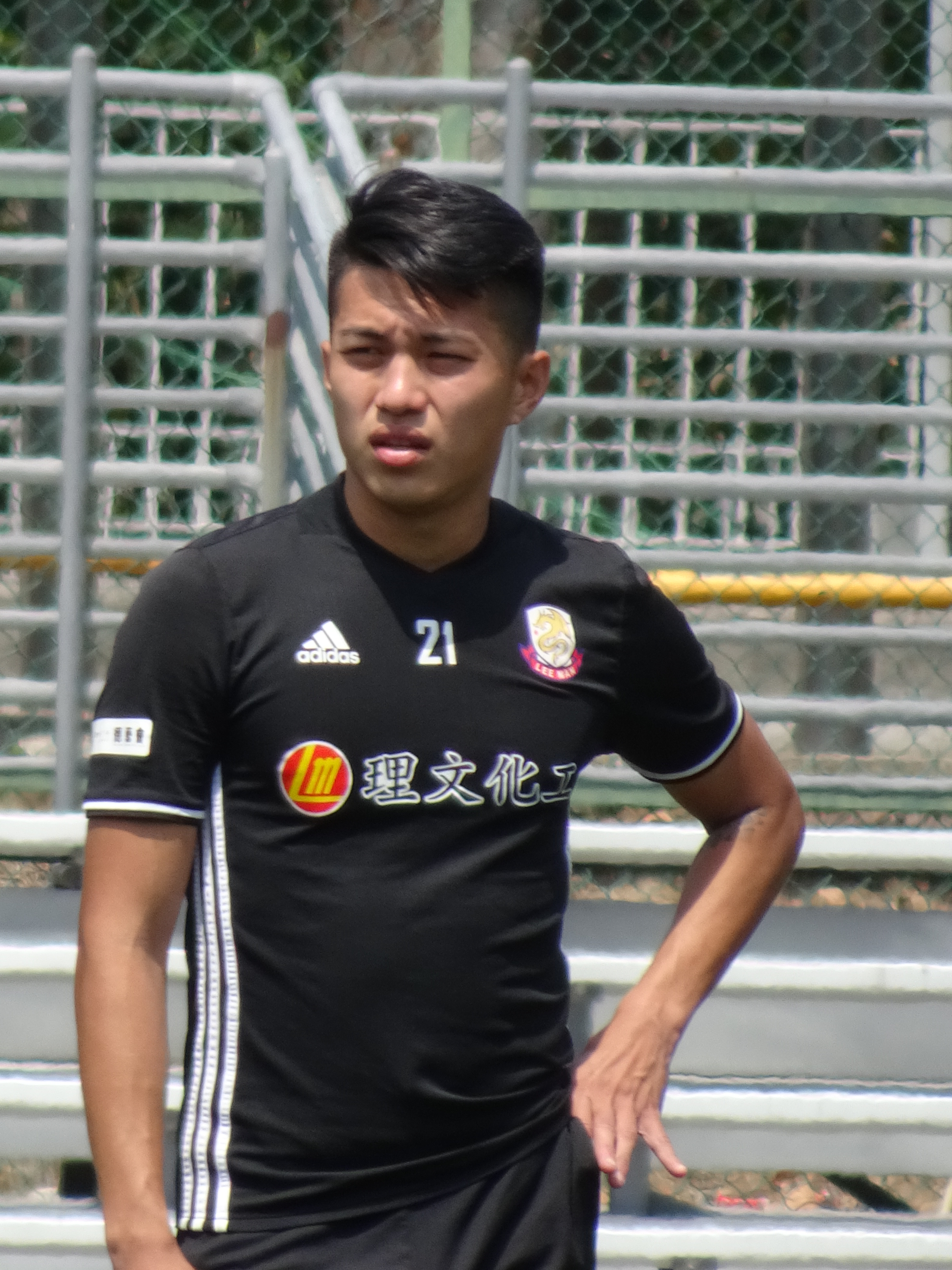

Personal information
- Full name: Law Chun Yan
- Date of birth: 21 June 1994 (age 32)
- Place of birth: Hong Kong
- Height: 1.77 m (5 ft 10 in)
- Position: Left wing

Team information
- Current team: 3 Sing
- Number: 21

Youth career
- South China

Senior career*
Years	Team	Apps	(Gls)
2013	Wan Chai	14	(2)
2013–2015	South China	0	(0)
2015	Sham Shui Po	3	(3)
2015–2016	Yau Tsim Mong	14	(4)
2016–2017	Hong Kong Rangers	16	(1)
2017–2019	Lee Man	17	(2)
2019–2021	Resources Capital	22	(2)
2021–2023	North District	36	(23)
2023–2026	3 Sing	53	(29)
2026–	Yuen Long	8	(8)
- * Club domestic league appearances and goals as of 9 July 2020

Law Chun Yan (Chinese: 羅俊仁; born 21 June 1994) is a Hong Kong footballer who played as a Winger for Hong Kong First Division club 3 Sing.
