= João Emir =

Brazilian footballer

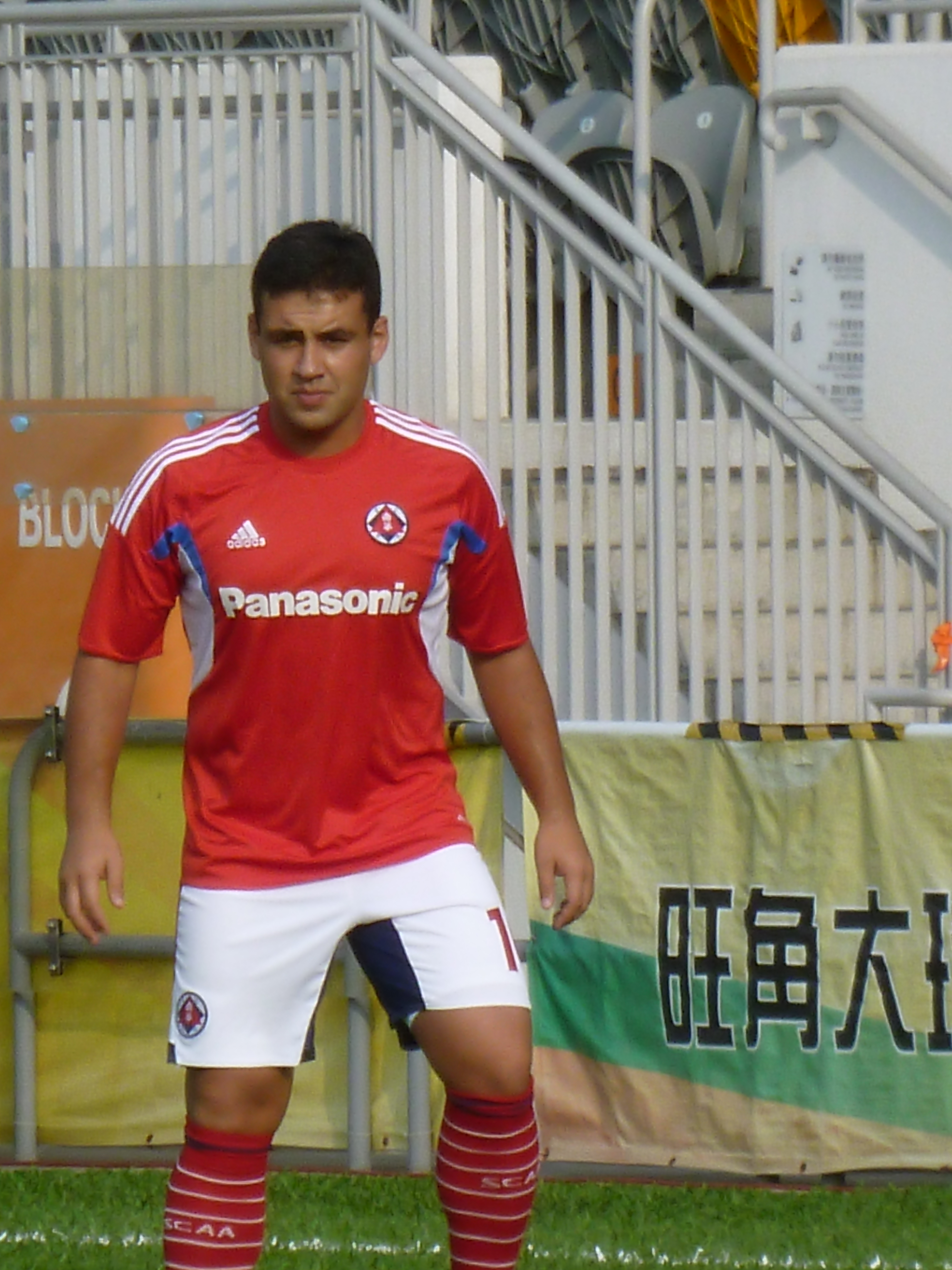

Personal information
- Full name: João Emir Porto Pereira
- Date of birth: 17 March 1989 (age 37)
- Place of birth: Pelotas, Brazil
- Height: 1.73 m (5 ft 8 in)
- Position: Midfielder

Youth career
- 2010–2011: Brasil de Pelotas

Senior career*
Years	Team	Apps	(Gls)
2011–2012	Brasil de Pelotas	2	(0)
2012	South China	3	(0)
2013–2014	South China	16	(1)
2015–2018	Pegasus	57	(19)
2019	Tai Po	8	(0)
2019–2021	Eastern	17	(2)
2022–2024	Tai Po	24	(0)
2024–2025	Fu Moon	4	(0)
2026–	Wui Hong		
- * Club domestic league appearances and goals as of 1 January 2025

João Emir Porto Pereira (Chinese: 利馬; born 17 March 1989) is a Brazilian former professional footballer. He primarily plays as a central midfielder, but also plays as an attacking midfielder.

== Club career ==
=== South China ===
On 29 December 2011, South China announced that Emir, alongside Dhiego Martins and Yeo Jee-Hoon, had joined the club. He made his debut for South China on 4 February 2012 at Mong Kok Stadium, helping help the team secure a 4–2 win over Sun Hei.

On 23 March 2012, chairman Steven Lo confirmed that Emir was ruled out for the season due to torn ligament.

On 10 July 2012, chairman Steven Lo confirmed the departure of Emir due to contract problem with his previous club.

=== Return to South China ===
On 31 May 2013, Emir rejoined Hong Kong First Division side South China.

=== Pegasus ===
Emir joined Pegasus on 20 August 2015. On 7 July 2017, it was confirmed by Pegasus that he had signed a new contract for the upcoming HKPL season.

=== Tai Po ===
On 31 December 2018, it was announced that Pegasus had reached an agreement with Tai Po to swap Emir in exchange for David Lazari.

=== Eastern ===
On 17 July 2019, Emir signed for Eastern.

=== Tai Po ===
On 8 August 2022, Emir returned to Tai Po.

== International career ==
On 30 April 2024, it was announced that Emir had received his HKSAR passport after giving up his Brazilian passport, making him eligible to represent Hong Kong internationally.

== Career stats ==
=== Club ===
As of 31 December 2018. The following table only shows statistics in Hong Kong.

Club	Season	Division	League		Senior Shield		League Cup		FA Cup		League Playoff		AFC Cup		Total	
Club	Season	Division	Apps	Goals	Apps	Goals	Apps	Goals	Apps	Goals	Apps	Goals	Apps	Goals	Apps	Goals
South China	2011–12	First Division	3	0	1	0	0	0	0	0	0	0	0	0	4	0
South China	2013–14	First Division	16	1	3	2	0	0	0	0	2	0	4	0	23	3
South China	Total		19	1	4	2	0	0	0	0	2	0	4	0	27	3
Pegasus	2015–16	Hong Kong Premier League	15	4	1	0	3	0	2	0	1	1	0	0	22	5
Pegasus	2016–17	Hong Kong Premier League	19	7	2	0	0	0	1	0	0	0	0	0	22	7
Pegasus	2017–18	Hong Kong Premier League	16	6	1	0	0	0	2	0	0	0	0	0	19	6
Pegasus	2018–19	Hong Kong Premier League	7	2	1	0	0	0	0	0	0	0	0	0	8	2
Pegasus	Total		57	19	5	0	3	0	5	0	1	1	0	0	71	20
Tai Po	2018–19	Hong Kong Premier League	0	0	0	0	0	0	0	0	0	0	0	0	0	0
Tai Po	Total		0	0	0	0	0	0	0	0	0	0	0	0	0	0
Total			76	20	9	2	3	0	5	0	3	1	4	0	98	23

== Honours ==
=== Club ===
Eastern

- Hong Kong Senior Shield: 2019–20
- Hong Kong FA Cup: 2019–20

South China

- Hong Kong Senior Shield: 2013–14

Pegasus

- Hong Kong FA Cup: 2015–16
- Hong Kong Sapling Cup: 2015–16

Tai Po

- Hong Kong Premier League: 2018–19
