= Lo Kong Wai =

Hong Kong footballer (born 1992)

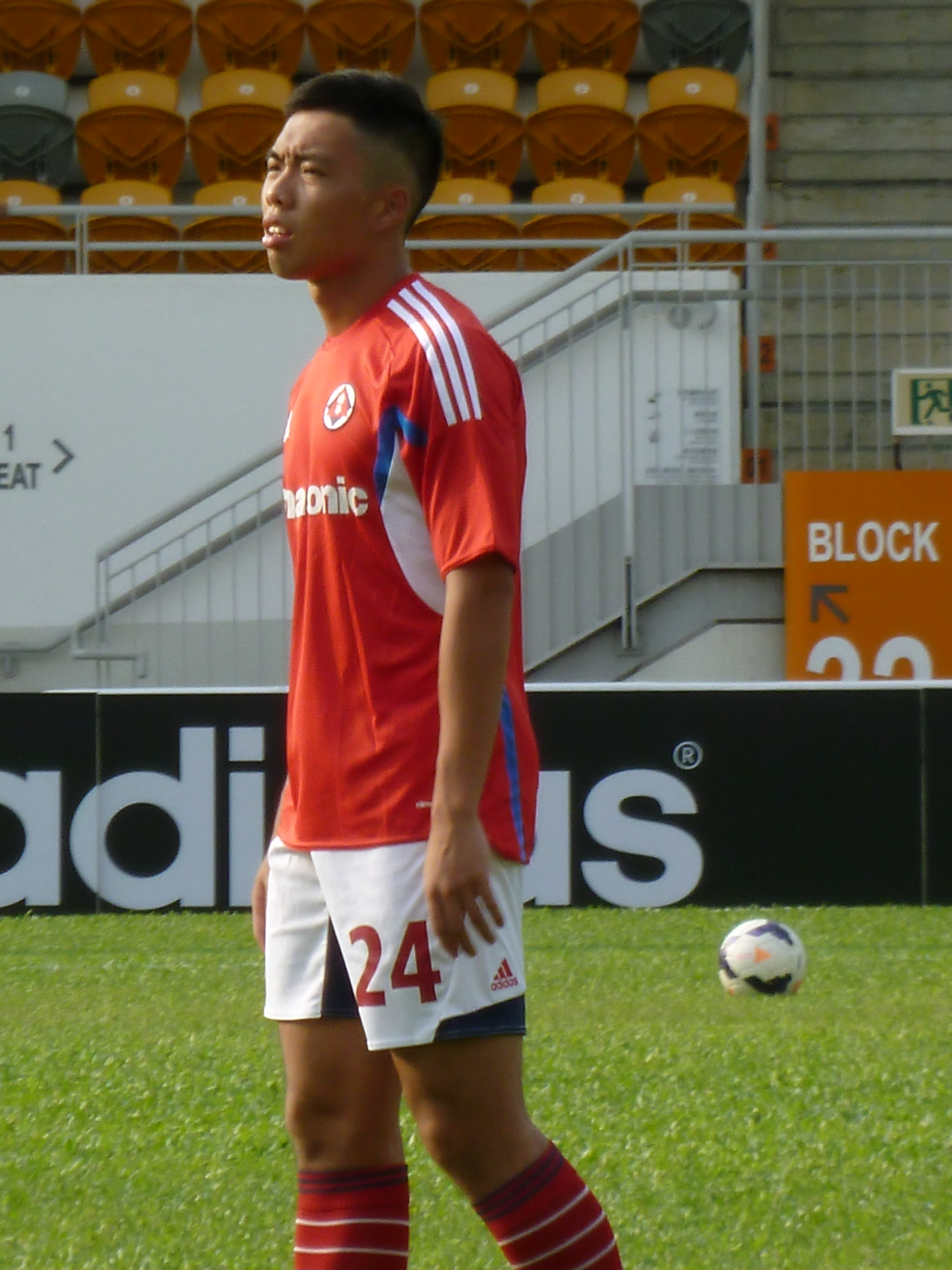

Personal information
- Full name: Lo Kong Wai
- Date of birth: 19 June 1992 (age 34)
- Place of birth: Hong Kong
- Height: 1.82 m (6 ft 0 in)
- Position: Winger

Team information
- Current team: North District
- Number: 9

Youth career
- Sham Shui Po

Senior career*
Years	Team	Apps	(Gls)
2008–2012	Sham Shui Po	46	(12)
2012–2015	Yokohama FC Hong Kong	6	(0)
2013–2015	→ South China (loan)	29	(3)
2015–2016	Pegasus	12	(1)
2016–2017	South China	16	(2)
2017–2018	Eastern	13	(1)
2018–2020	R&F	17	(0)
2020–2023	Sham Shui Po	42	(17)
2023–	North District	67	(7)

International career^{‡}
2012	Hong Kong U-23	2	(0)
2015–2017	Hong Kong	6	(0)
- * Club domestic league appearances and goals as of 20 November 2026 ‡ National team caps and goals as of 9 November 2017

Lo Kong Wai (Chinese: 羅港威; Jyutping: lo^{4} gong^{2} wai^{1}; born 19 June 1992) is a Hong Kong professional footballer who currently plays as a winger for Hong Kong Premier League club North District.

== Club career ==
He joined Hong Kong Third Division club Sham Shui Po when he was young. In 2008, youth team members were all promoted to the club's first team to gain experience. In the first season, the club reached the final of Junior Shield, which they eventually lost 0–2 to Sha Tin. Wong Wai played all 6 games and scored a goal in the quarter-finals.

Lo helped the club gain promotion to the First Division for the first time in club history by scoring 5 goals in 15 games in the 2010–11 season. In the 2011–12 season, he failed to help the team prevent relegation to the Second Division. However, he was notable for scoring a goal from South China in the first leg of quarter-finals in Senior Shield, helping the team gain a 1–1 draw.

He followed former Sham Shui Po players and manager Lee Chi Kin and joined Yokohama FC Hong Kong in July 2012.

Lo joined defending First Division champions South China for an undisclosed fee on 28 June 2013.

On 7 July 2017, Eastern announced via Facebook that they had signed Lo.

On 4 June 2018, it was reported that Lo had signed with fellow HKPL side R&F. This was confirmed by Eastern chairman Peter Leung on 19 July 2018, who also stated that his team could not compete with R&F's offer to double Lo's salary to HKD$100,000 a month.

On 29 May 2020, Lo confirmed that he would be leaving R&F after two years. However, on 12 September 2020, Lo was re-signed to a short-term contract until the end of the 2019–20 season.

On 2 November 2020, it was announced that Lo had finalized an agreement to return to Sham Shui Po.

On 12 July 2023, Lo joined North District.

== Career statistics ==
=== Club ===
As of 4 May 2013

Club	Season	Division	League		Senior Shield		League Cup		FA Cup		AFC Cup		Others^{1}		Total	
Club	Season	Division	Apps	Goals	Apps	Goals	Apps	Goals	Apps	Goals	Apps	Goals	Apps	Goals	Apps	Goals
Sham Shui Po	2008–09	Third 'District' Division	10	3	6^{2}	1^{2}	N/A	N/A	N/A	N/A	N/A	N/A	N/A	N/A	16	4
Sham Shui Po	2009–10	Third 'District' Division	9	2	—^{3}		N/A	N/A	N/A	N/A	N/A	N/A	3	0	12	2
Sham Shui Po	2010–11	Second Division	15	5	2^{2}	1^{2}	N/A	N/A	N/A	N/A	N/A	N/A	N/A	N/A	17	6
Sham Shui Po	2011–12	First Division	12	2	2	1	1	0	1	1	N/A	N/A	N/A	N/A	16	4
Sham Shui Po Total			46	12	10	3	1	0	1	1	0	0	3	0	61	16
Yokohama FC Hong Kong	2012–13	First Division	6	0	1	0	—	—	2	0	N/A	N/A	N/A	N/A	9	0
Yokohama FC Hong Kong Total			6	0	1	0	0	0	2	0	0	0	0	0	9	0
South China	2013–14	First Division	0	0	0	0	—	—	0	0	0	0	N/A	N/A	0	0
South China Total			0	0	0	0	0	0	0	0	0	0	0	0	0	0
Total			52	12	11	3	3	1	3	1	0	0	0	0	70	16

==== Notes ====
1. Others include Hong Kong Third Division Champion Play-off.
2. Since Sham Shui Po was competing in lower divisions, they could only join the Junior Shield instead of Senior Shield.
3. Hong Kong Junior Challenge Shield was not held in the 2009–10 season.

=== International ===
As of 7 June 2015. Scores and results list Hong Kong's goal tally first.

#	Date	Venue	Opponent	Result	Scored	Competition
1	6 June 2015	Shah Alam Stadium, Shah Alam, Selangor, Malaysia	Malaysia	0–0	0	Friendly

== Honours ==
=== Club ===
South China

- Hong Kong Senior Shield: 2013–14

Pegasus

- Hong Kong FA Cup: 2015–16
- Hong Kong Sapling Cup: 2015–16

== Personal life ==
Outside of football, Lo is a tech entrepreneur who operates an online store aimed at helping pro-democracy affiliated businesses in Hong Kong to sell surplus merchandise in bulk, at below market prices.
