= Leung Hing Kit =

Hong Kong footballer (born 1989)

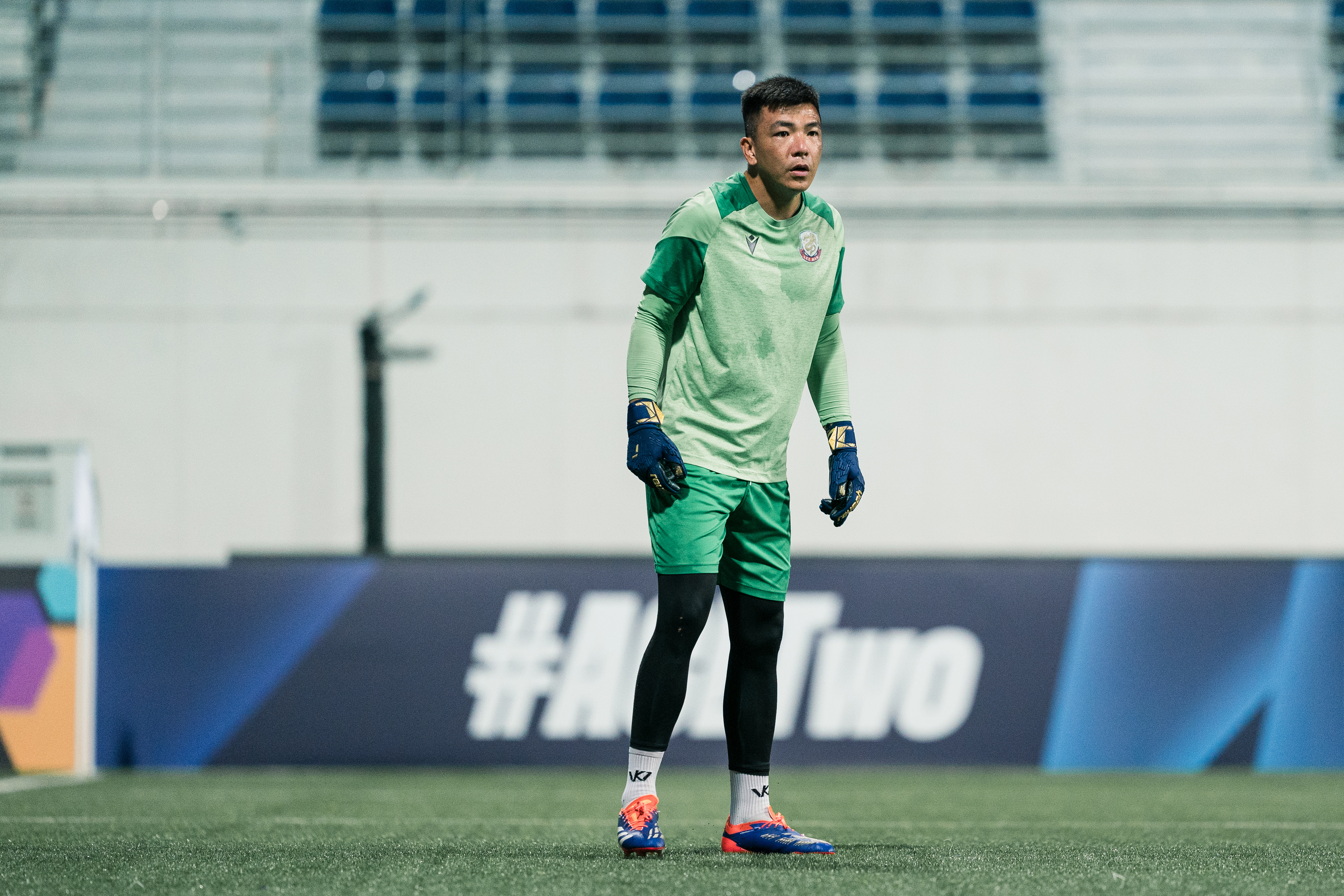

Personal information
- Full name: Leung Hing Kit
- Date of birth: 22 October 1989 (age 37)
- Place of birth: Hong Kong
- Height: 1.83 m (6 ft 0 in)
- Position: Goalkeeper

Team information
- Current team: Lee Man
- Number: 1

Youth career
- 2005–2006: Hong Kong 09

Senior career*
Years	Team	Apps	(Gls)
2006–2007	Hong Kong 08	0	(0)
2007–2015	Rangers (HKG)	67	(0)
2014–2015	→ South China (loan)	4	(0)
2015–2017	South China	9	(0)
2017–2021	Pegasus	46	(0)
2021–2024	Rangers (HKG)	32	(0)
2024	Sham Shui Po	13	(0)
2024–	Lee Man	6	(0)

International career^{‡}
2010–2011	Hong Kong U-23	3	(0)
2010	Hong Kong	1	(0)
- * Club domestic league appearances and goals as of 17 May 2026 ‡ National team caps and goals as of 10 October 2010

Leung Hing Kit (Chinese: 梁興傑; Jyutping: loeng^{4} hing^{3} git^{6}; born 22 October 1989) is a Hong Kong professional footballer who currently plays as a goalkeeper for Hong Kong Premier League club Lee Man.

== Club career ==
On 11 June 2017, Pegasus chairperson Canny Leung revealed that Leung along with three other South China players would be jumping ship to Pegasus and he became the captain of the team in the 2020–21 season. In April 2021, he was awarded Hong Kong Premier League Player of the Month.

On 16 July 2021, Leung joined Rangers, wearing the unusual number 11 shirt popularised by Rui Patrício.

On 26 January 2024, Leung joined Sham Shui Po.

On 6 July 2024, Leung joined Lee Man.

== International career ==
On 10 October 2010, Leung made his international debut for Hong Kong in a 2010 Long Teng Cup match against Macau.

== Career statistics ==
=== Club ===
Club	Season	No.	League		League Cup		Senior Shield		FA Cup		Reserve		Total	
Club	Season	No.	Apps	Goals	Apps	Goals	Apps	Goals	Apps	Goals	Apps	Goals	Apps	Goals
Bulova Rangers	2007–08	19	3 (1)	0	1	0	1	0	0	0	16	0	5 (1)	0
Bulova Rangers	Total													
Career Total														

=== International ===
==== Hong Kong ====
National team	Year	Apps	Goals
Hong Kong	2010	1	0
Total		1	0

As of 18 November 2010

#	Date	Venue	Opponent	Result	Scored	Competition
1	10 October 2010	Kaohsiung National Stadium, Kaohsiung	Macau	4–0	0	2010 Long Teng Cup

== Honour ==
Lee Man

- Hong Kong League Cup: 2025–26
