= Vincent Weijl =

Dutch footballer (born 1990)

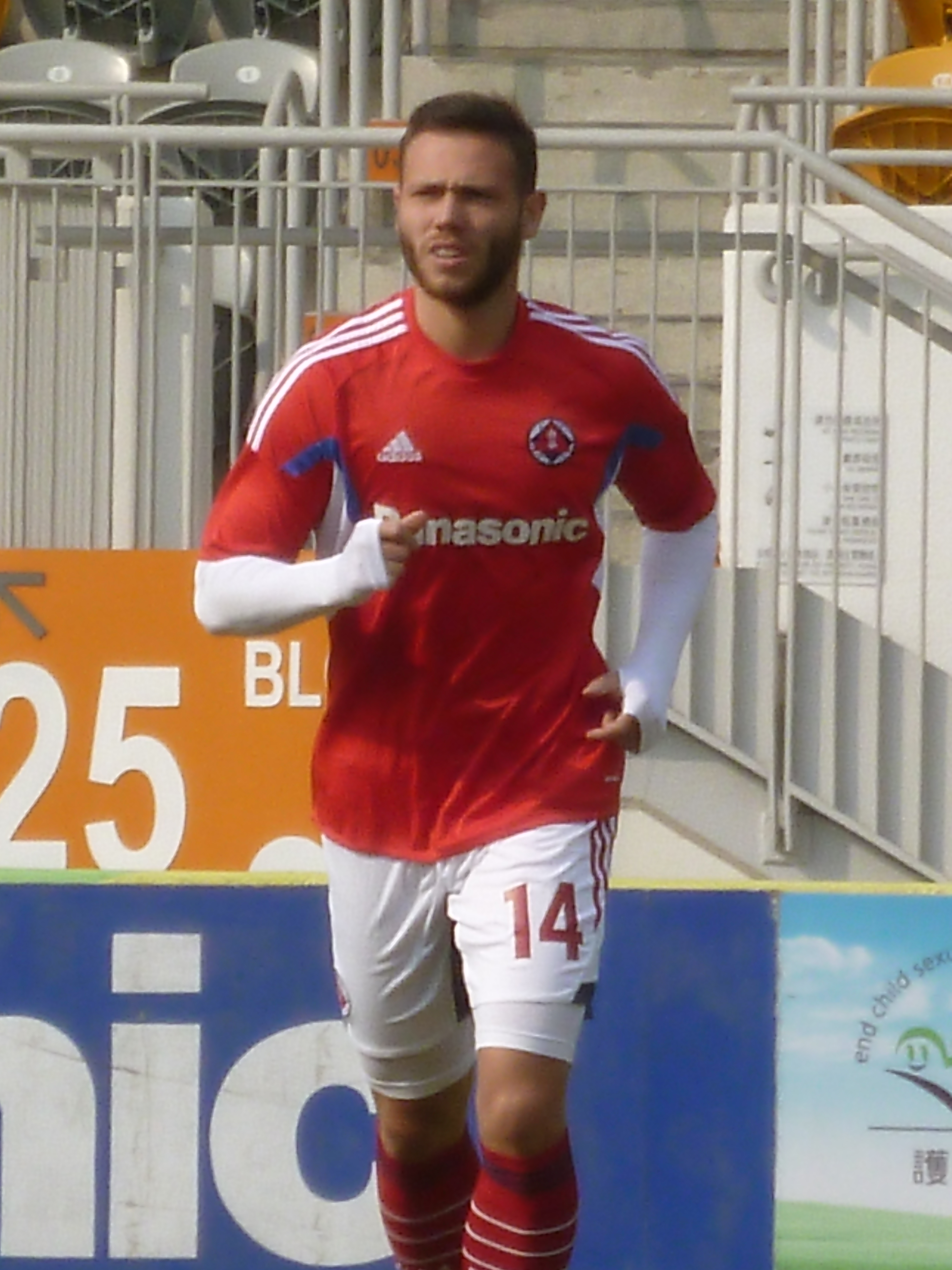

Personal information
- Full name: Vincent Lucas Weijl
- Date of birth: 11 November 1990 (age 36)
- Place of birth: Amsterdam, Netherlands
- Height: 1.83 m (6 ft 0 in)
- Position: Midfielder

Team information
- Current team: AFC
- Number: 19

Youth career
- 2004–2008: AZ

Senior career*
Years	Team	Apps	(Gls)
2008–2010	Liverpool	0	(0)
2010	→ Helmond (loan)	9	(1)
2010–2011	Eibar	15	(1)
2012–2013	Cambuur	8	(0)
2013–2014	South China	9	(2)
2014–2015	Tai Po	15	(8)
2015	Fuenlabrada	6	(0)
2016–2017	Fredericia	18	(2)
2017	PKNP	20	(2)
2018	Samtredia	10	(1)
2018–2019	ÍA	5	(0)
2019–	AFC	7	(0)

International career
2009–2010	Netherlands U19	5	(0)
2010	Netherlands U20	1	(0)
- * Club domestic league appearances and goals as of 18 May 2019

Vincent Lucas Weijl (born 11 November 1990) is a Dutch professional footballer who plays for Amsterdamsche FC as a midfielder.

During his career he played in the Netherlands, Spain, Hong Kong, Denmark, Malaysia, Georgia and Iceland, with an additional two-year spell at Liverpool in which he collected no first-team appearances.

== Club career ==
Born in Amsterdam, Weijl came through the youth ranks at AZ Alkmaar, moving to Liverpool in the 2008 summer transfer window, aged 17. Limited to reserve football, he was loaned to Eerste Divisie club Helmond Sport in January 2010.

On 27 August 2010, Weijl signed for Spanish side SD Eibar on a two-year contract, being sparingly used by the Segunda División B team (less than one third of the league matches in his only full season). In January 2012 he returned to his country and joined SC Cambuur, also in the second level.

After a few months in the United States in which he only played for reserve teams, Weijl moved to South China AA on 5 December 2013. He scored his first goal in the Hong Kong First Division League on 18 January of the following year, to help to a 4–1 away win against Citizen AA.

After an unassuming spell back in Spain with CF Fuenlabrada, Weijl moved teams and countries again in the 2016 January transfer window, signing with FC Fredericia in the Danish 1st Division. In December of that year, he left the latter club.

In the following years Weijl rarely settled with a club, representing in quick succession PKNP FC (Malaysia Premier League), FC Samtredia (Georgian Erovnuli Liga) and Íþróttabandalag Akraness (Icelandic second tier).
