= Ko Kyung-joon =

South Korean footballer (born 1987)

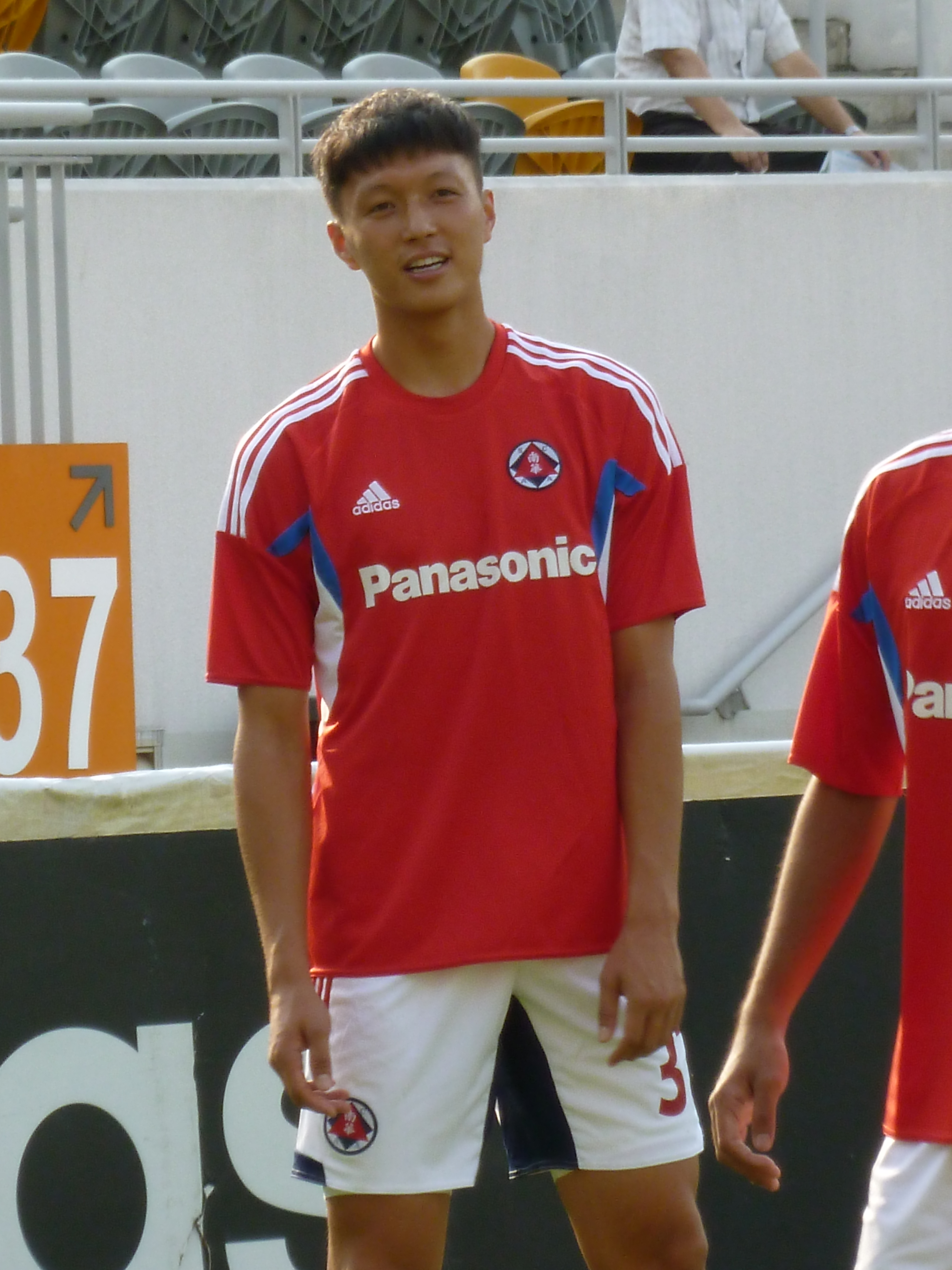

Personal information
- Date of birth: March 7, 1987 (age 39)
- Place of birth: Jeju, South Korea
- Height: 1.86 m (6 ft 1 in)
- Position: Defender

Team information
- Current team: Stallion Laguna
- Number: 15

Youth career
- 2003–2005: Jeju Jeil High School

Senior career*
Years	Team	Apps	(Gls)
2006	Suwon Samsung Bluewings	3	(0)
2007	Chunnam Dragons	0	(0)
2008	Gyeongnam FC	0	(0)
2009	Yesan FC	9	(1)
2009–2010	Ulsan Hyundai Mipo Dockyard Dolphin	13	(3)
2011–2013	Icheon Citizen		
2013	Hwaseong FC		
2013–2014	South China	14	(1)
2015	Tokyo Verdy	6	(0)
2016–2017	Seoul E-Land	1	(0)
2017–	Stallion Laguna		
- * Club domestic league appearances and goals as of 28 November 2016

- Ko Kyung-joon
- Hangul: 고경준
- Hanja: 高敬竣
- RR: Go Gyeongjun
- MR: Ko Kyŏngjun

Ko Kyung-joon (born March 7, 1987) is a South Korean football player who plays for Stallion Laguna in the Philippines Football League.

He formerly played for Suwon Samsung Bluewings, Chunnam Dragons, Gyeongnam FC, Yesan FC, Tokyo Verdy, and Seoul E-Land.

== Career ==
In 2006, Ko played three games for Suwon Samsung Bluewings in the K League, and scored one goal in six league cup appearances.

=== Stallion Laguna ===
In August 2017, he joined Philippines Football League club Stallion Laguna. On August 12, 2017, he made his debut on a 2–3 home defeat against Meralco Manila, he scored his first goal for the club as well.
