= Aender =

Brazilian-born Hong Kong footballer (born 1983)

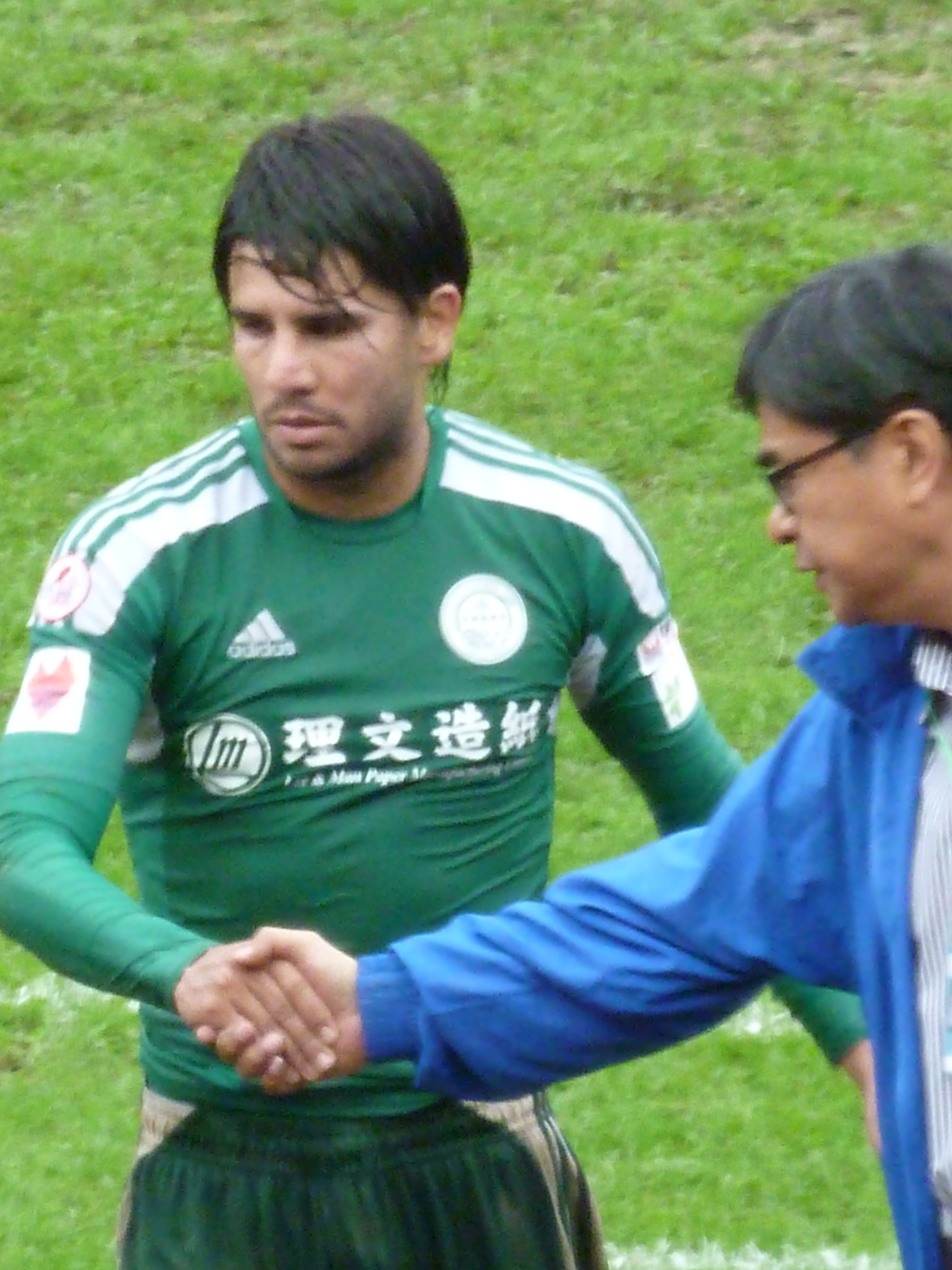

Personal information
- Full name: Aender Naves Mesquita
- Date of birth: 12 February 1983 (age 43)
- Place of birth: Barra do Garças, Brazil
- Height: 1.75 m (5 ft 9 in)
- Position: Midfielder

Youth career
- Ituano-SP

Senior career*
Years	Team	Apps	(Gls)
2000–2005	Ituano-SP		
2006–2007	Juventus-SP		
2007	Gama-DF		
2008	Juventus-SP		
2008	Paraná	2	(1)
2009	Mogi Mirim	14	(1)
2010	Atlético Sorocaba	6	(1)
2011	Veranópolis	11	(0)
2011–2012	Sham Shui Po	13	(0)
2012–2013	Tai Po	18	(4)
2013	South China	4	(0)
2014	→ Rangers (HKG) (loan)	5	(0)
2014	Kedah	0	(0)
2014–2015	Tai Po	12	(0)
2015–2016	Wong Tai Sin	15	(2)
2016	Eastern District	10	(4)
2017	Metro Gallery	11	(3)
2017–2019	Eastern District	39	(10)
2019–2020	Rangers (HKG)	9	(3)
2020–2021	Yuen Long	11	(2)
2021–2022	Tai Po	14	(0)
2022–2024	Central & Western	30	(3)
2024–2025	Eastern District	5	(0)
- * Club domestic league appearances and goals as of 30 June 2025

Aender Naves Mesquita (commonly known as Aender, Chinese: 安達 ; born 12 February 1983) is a former professional footballer who played as a midfielder. Born in Brazil, he acquired his HKSAR passport in May 2019.

== Club career ==
=== Shum Shui Po ===
On 28 October 2011, Aender joined Hong Kong First Division League club Sham Shui Po. Although unable to save the team from relegation, he was voted as Most Favorite Player by fans at the Hong Kong Top Footballer Awards.

=== Tai Po ===
Following the relegation of Sham Shui Po, Aender joined fellow First Division club Wofoo Tai Po, signing a 1-year contract.

On 4 May 2013, he scored in the 90th minute against Yokohama FC Hong Kong, changing the scoreboard into 2–1 for Wofoo Tai Po. As Citizen and Sunray Cave JC Sun Hei have won their match respectively, a win was critical for Wofoo Tai Po as 3 points could avoid relegation. However, in the last minute of stoppage time, Yokohama FC Hong Kong's Kenji Fukuda scored and thus sent Wofoo Tai Po into the Second Division.

Aender confirmed his departure following the relegation of Tai Po.

=== South China ===
On 31 May 2013, Aender joined First Division defending champions South China for free. He struggled to earn a starting spot in the first half of the season. In December 2013 he was loaned to Biu Chun Rangers for the remainder of the season.

=== Kedah ===
In April 2014, Naves joined Malaysian outfit Kedah.

=== 1st return to Tai Po ===
In September 2014, Aender returned to Hong Kong Premier League club Tai Po.

=== 2nd return to Tai Po ===
At the start of the 2021–22 season, Aender returned to Tai Po after a stint around Hong Kong.

Tai Po announced the departure of Aender by mutual termination on 7 December 2022.

=== Central & Western ===
On 9 December 2022, Central & Western announced the joining of Aender.

== International career ==
On 10 May 2019, Aender officially announced that he had received a Hong Kong passport after giving up his Brazilian passport, making him eligible to represent Hong Kong internationally.

== Career statistics ==
=== Club ===
As of 31 May 2013. Following table only shows statistics in Hong Kong.

Club	Season	Division	League		Shield & FA Cup		League Cup		AFC Cup		Others^{1}		Total	
Club	Season	Division	Apps	Goals	Apps	Goals	Apps	Goals	Apps	Goals	Apps	Goals	Apps	Goals
Sham Shui Po	2011–12	First Division	13	0	1	0	2	0	N/A	N/A	N/A	N/A	16	0
Tai Po	2012–13	First Division	18	4	11	2	—	—	N/A	N/A	1	1	30	7
South China	2013–14	First Division	4	0	0	0	—	—	0	0	0	0	0	0
Rangers	2013–14	First Division	5	0	0	0	—	—	0	0	0	0	0	0
Total			40	4	12	2	2	0	0	0	1	1	46	7

Remarks:
^{1} Others include 2013 Hong Kong AFC Cup playoffs.

== Honours ==
=== Club ===
Tai Po

- Hong Kong Senior Challenge Shield (1): 2012–13
