= Mamadou Barry =

Guinean footballer

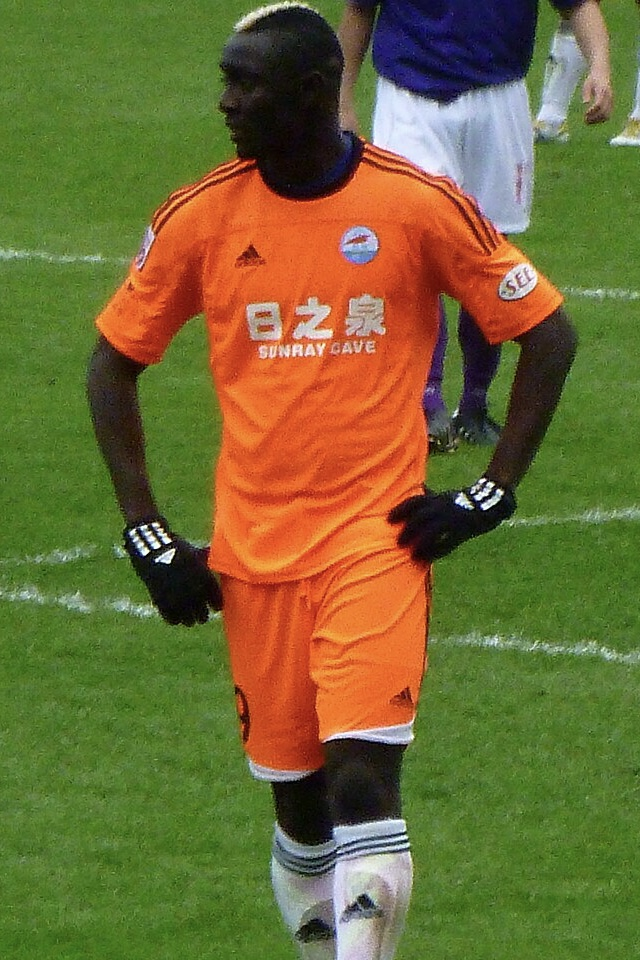
- Barry playing for Sun Hei in 2012

Personal information
- Full name: Mamadou Hady Barry
- Date of birth: 16 May 1986 (age 40)
- Place of birth: Conakry, Guinea
- Height: 1.90 m (6 ft 3 in)
- Position: Striker

Senior career*
Years	Team	Apps	(Gls)
2006–2010	Persipal Palu	70	(32)
2010–2011	Persires Rengat	26	(15)
2011–2013	Sun Hei	40	(22)
2013–2014	South China	8	(5)
2014	Terengganu	9	(2)
2014–2015	YFCMD	7	(1)
2017–2018	PS TNI	0	(0)
2021	PSMS Medan	1	(0)
2021–2023	Persewar Waropen	10	(4)
2023–2024	PSBS Biak	19	(8)
2024–2025	Adhyaksa	2	(0)
2026	Persikad Depok	4	(0)
- * Club domestic league appearances and goals as of 28 February 2026

Mamadou Hady Barry (born 16 May 1986), also known as Mamadou Barry, is a Guinean professional footballer who plays as a striker.

== Club career ==
=== Persipal Palu ===
Barry played for Persipal Palu in Indonesia for 5 years before joining Sun Hei.

=== Sun Hei ===
He joined Sun Hei in January 2011. He had his first appearance for Sun Hei against Kitchee in Hong Kong First Division League, and he scored a goal. On 16 October 2011, Barry became the first player to score a hat-trick at the newly renovated Mong Kok Stadium.

=== South China ===
He joined fellow Hong Kong club South China in June 2013 for free. On 1 September 2013, Barry netted a brace on his debut for South China; the match finished 3–2 with South China the victors. He scored 5 goals during his half-season stint with the club, in which 4 of them were from the penalty spot. In December 2013, South China received a berth for the 2014 AFC Champions League qualifying play-off and decided to move on for expatriate players of better quality, hence parted way with Barry.

=== PSMS Medan ===
He was signed for PSMS Medan to play in the Liga 2 in the 2021 season. Barry made his debut on 20 October 2021 in a match against PSPS Riau at the Gelora Sriwijaya Stadium, Palembang.

=== Persewar Waropen ===
In November 2021, Barry signed a contract with Liga 1 club Persewar Waropen. He made his league debut on 4 November 2021 in a 3–1 win against Kalteng Putra at the Batakan Stadium, Balikpapan. On 24 November 2021, Barry scored his first goal for Persewar against Persiba Balikpapan in the 9th minute at the Batakan Stadium, Balikpapan.

== International career ==
He was called up by Guinea U23 for the match against Mali U23 in 2012 CAF Men's Pre-Olympic Tournament. He scored a goal in the 84th minute. The match ended 2–2 and Mali won on the away goals rule.

== Personal life ==
Born and raised in Guinea, he acquired Indonesian citizenship in 2021.

== Career statistics ==
=== Club ===
As of 28 February 2026

Appearances and goals by club, season and competition
Club	Season	League			Cup		Continental		Other		Total	
Club	Season	Division	Apps	Goals	Apps	Goals	Apps	Goals	Apps	Goals	Apps	Goals
South China	2013–14	Hong Kong First Division League	8	5	0	0	–		0	0	8	5
Terengganu	2014	Malaysia Super League	9	2	0	0	–		0	0	9	2
YFCMD	2014–15	Hong Kong Premier League	7	1	3 (Note: Includes Hong Kong FA Cup)	0	–		1 (Note: Appearances in Sapling Cup)	0	11	1
PSMS Medan	2021	Liga 2	1	0	0	0	–		0	0	1	0
Persewar Waropen	2021	Liga 2	4	2	0	0	–		0	0	4	2
Persewar Waropen	2022–23	Liga 2	6	2	0	0	–		0	0	6	2
PSBS Biak	2023–24	Liga 2	19	8	0	0	–		0	0	19	8
Adhyaksa	2024–25	Liga 2	2	0	0	0	–		0	0	2	0
Persikad Depok	2025–26	Championship	4	0	0	0	–		0	0	4	0
Career total			60	20	3	0	0	0	1	0	64	20

== Honours ==
Sun Hei

- Hong Kong Senior Challenge Shield: 2011–12

PSBS Biak

- Liga 2: 2023–24
