= Zhang Chunhui =

Hong Kong footballer and coach

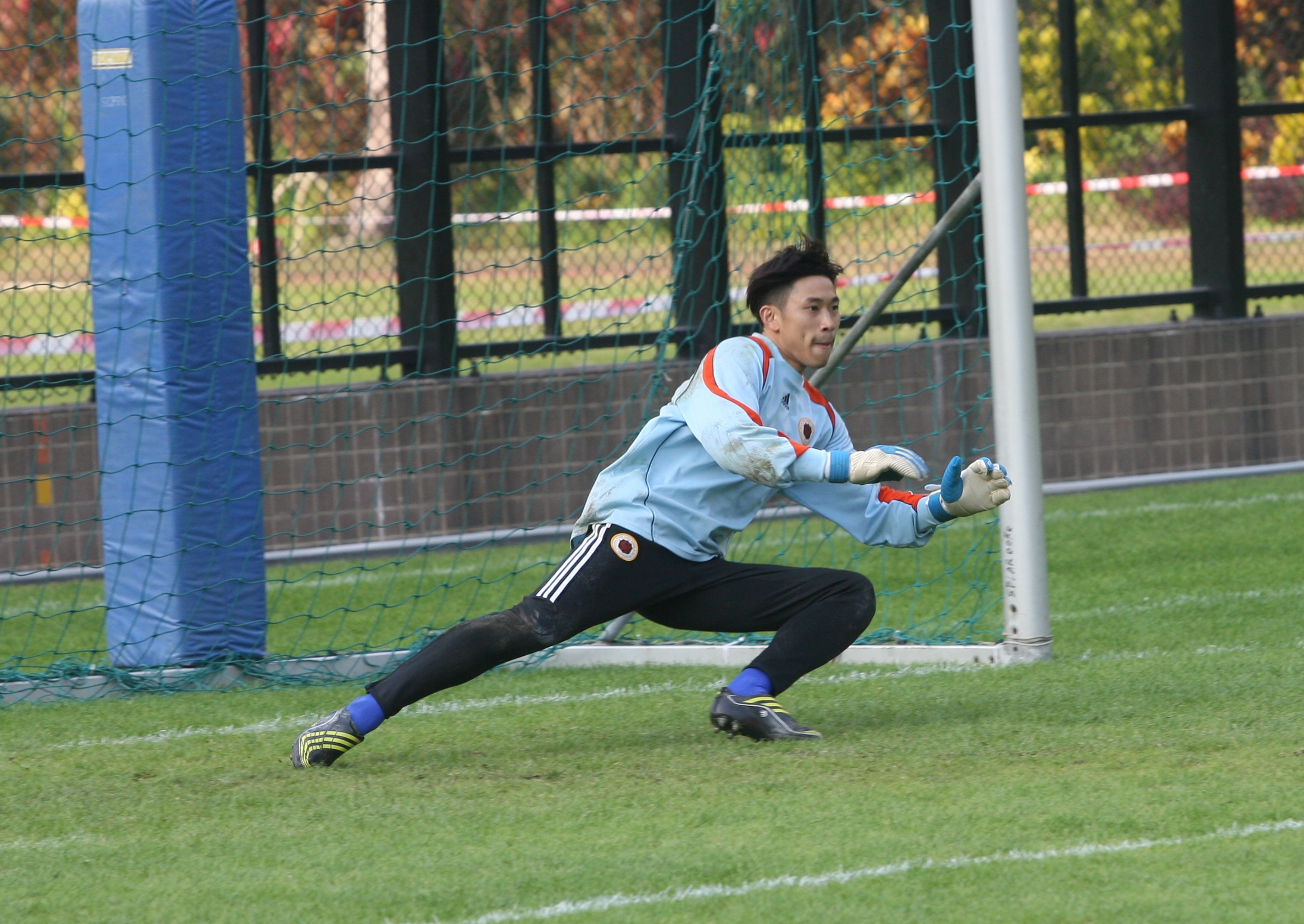

Personal information
- Full name: Zhang Chunhui
- Date of birth: 13 March 1983 (age 43)
- Place of birth: Guangzhou, Guangdong, China
- Height: 1.80 m (5 ft 11 in)
- Position: Goalkeeper

Senior career*
Years	Team	Apps	(Gls)
2000–2004	Guangzhou		
2002–2004	→ Xiangxue Pharmaceutical (loan)	15	(0)
2004–2005	Fukien	16	(0)
2005–2006	Rangers (HKG)	3	(0)
2006–2012	South China	62	(0)
2012–2013	Sun Hei	13	(0)
2013	South China	2	(0)
2014	Southern	0	(0)
2018	Eastern District	3	(0)
2018–2019	Pegasus	7	(0)
2020–2021	Metro Gallery	0	(0)
2025	Lun Lok		

International career^{‡}
2009–2010	Hong Kong	8	(0)

Managerial career
- 2018–2019: Pegasus (goalkeeping coach)
Chinese name
Traditional Chinese	張春暉
Simplified Chinese	张春晖
Transcriptions Standard Mandarin: Hanyu Pinyin: Zhāng Chūnhuī; Yue: Cantonese: Jyutping: zoeng^{1} ceon^{1} fai^{1}
- * Club domestic league appearances and goals as of 5 November 2019 ‡ National team caps and goals as of 17 November 2010

Zhang Chunhui (simplified Chinese: 张春晖; traditional Chinese: 張春暉; born 13 March 1983) is a football coach and former professional footballer. Born in China, he represented Hong Kong internationally.

== Club career ==
Zhang was selected in the Hong Kong Top Footballer Awards (Best XI Squad) in the 2006–07 season.

On 2 July 2018, it was reported that Zhang had joined Pegasus as a player-coach. He was released by the club on 5 November 2019 due to discipline issues.

== International career ==
Zhang is eligible to represent Hong Kong in international competitions after living there for 2 years. He was called up by the new Hong Kong national football team head coach Lee Kin Wo into the training squad of the team for the first time on 22 May 2007 for a friendly match against Indonesia.

Zhang was selected into Hong Kong League XI for 2007 Lunar New Year Cup and played in the first round against the Jamaica Olympic Team.

On 14 January 2009, Zhang made his international debut for Hong Kong in a friendly match against India.

== Personal life ==
On 9 July 2008, Zhang was sentenced to imprisonment for 8 months for the offence of inflicting grievous bodily harm upon another person. He injured a 17-year-old boy in Causeway Bay on 19 December 2007.

== Career statistics ==
=== Club ===
As of 23 August 2011

Club performance			League		Cup		League Cup		Continental		Total	
Season	Club	League	Apps	Goals	Apps	Goals	Apps	Goals	Apps	Goals	Apps	Goals
China PR			League		FA Cup		CSL Cup		Asia		Total	
2000	Guangzhou F.C.	League One					-		-			
2001	Guangzhou F.C.	League One					-		-			
2002	Guangzhou F.C.	League One					-		-			
Hong Kong			League		FA Cup & Shield		League Cup		Asia		Total	
2002-03	Xiangxue Pharmaceutical	First Division							-			
2003-04	Xiangxue Pharmaceutical	First Division	9	0	1	0	4	0	-		14	0
2004-05	Fukien	First Division	16	0	4	0	2	0	-		22	0
2005-06	Rangers (HKG)	First Division	3	0	1	0	1	0	-		5	0
2006-07	South China	First Division	15	0	9	0	4	0	-		28	0
2007-08	South China	First Division	16	0	6	0	2	0	5	0	29	0
2008-09	South China	First Division	11	0	3	0	1	0	6	0	21	0
2009-10	South China	First Division	12	0	3	0	-		9	0	24	0
2010-11	South China	First Division	8	0	2	0	1	0	0	0	11	0
2011-12	South China	First Division	0	0	0	0	0	0	-		0	0
Total	China PR											
Total	Hong Kong											
Career total												

=== International ===
As of 17 November 2009

#	Date	Venue	Opponents	Result	Goals	Competition
1	14 January 2009	Hong Kong Stadium, Hong Kong	India	2 – 1	0	Friendly
2	21 January 2009	Hong Kong Stadium, Hong Kong	Bahrain	1 – 3	0	2011 AFC Asian Cup qualification
3	28 January 2009	Ali Muhesen Stadium, Sana'a, Yemen	Yemen	0 – 1	0	2011 AFC Asian Cup qualification
4	27 August 2009	World Games Stadium, Kaohsiung, Taiwan	Guam	12 – 0	0	2010 East Asian Football Championship Semi-Final
5	9 October 2009	Outsourcing Stadium, Shizuoka, Japan	Japan	0 – 6	0	2011 AFC Asian Cup qualification
6	18 November 2009	Hong Kong Stadium, Hong Kong	Japan	0 – 4	0	2011 AFC Asian Cup qualification
7	7 February 2010	Olympic Stadium, Tokyo, Japan	South Korea	0 – 5	0	2010 East Asian Football Championship
8	17 November 2010	Hong Kong Stadium, Hong Kong	Paraguay	0 – 7	0	Friendly
