= 2012–13 Southern District RSA season =

Southern
2012–13 season
- President: Wong Ling Sun
- Head Coach: Fung Hoi Man
- Home ground: Aberdeen Sports Ground
- First Division: 4th
- Senior Shield: Semi-finals
- FA Cup: First round
- Top goalscorer: League: Jonathan Carril (8); All: Jonathan Carril (10)
- Highest home attendance: 1,058 (20 April vs South China, First Division)
- Lowest home attendance: 301 (30 March vs Biu Chun Rangers, First Division)
- Average home league attendance: 516 (in all competitions)
Home colours	Away colours

The 2012–13 season is Southern District RSA's debut season in the Hong Kong First Division League since their establishment. They will seek to avoid relegation in the Hong Kong First Division League, as well as to achieve a better result in the Senior Challenge Shield and the FA Cup.

== Players ==
=== First Team Squad ===
As of 3 March 2013.

Note: Flags indicate national team as defined under FIFA eligibility rules; some limited exceptions apply. Players may hold more than one non-FIFA nationality.

No.	Pos.	Nation	Player
1	GK	HKG	Lee Yang Xuan
3	DF	HKG	Wisdom Fofo Agbo (captain)
5	DF	ESP	Rubén López^{FP} (1st vice-captain)
6	DF	HKG	Chui Yiu Chung
7	MF	HKG	Chow Ka Wa
8	FW	HKG	Ko Chun
9	FW	ESP	Dieguito^{FP}
10	DF	HKG	Lam Ho Kwan
11	FW	CMR	Paul Ngue^{FP}
12	DF	HKG	Tse Man Wing
13	DF	HKG	Ha Shing Chi
14	MF	HKG	Tsang Tsz Hin
15	DF	HKG	Chan Cheuk Kwong

No.	Pos.	Nation	Player
16	MF	HKG	Ip Chung Long (on loan from Kitchee)
18	MF	HKG	Chung Hon Chee
19	MF	HKG	Cheng Chi Wing
20	DF	HKG	Tsang Chiu Tat
21	MF	HKG	Kwok Ting Him
22	MF	HKG	Ng Siu Fai
23	MF	ESP	Lander Panera^{FP}
24	DF	HKG	To Philip Michael
25	GK	HKG	Chiu Yu Ming
26	DF	HKG	Lee Sze Ho
27	MF	CAN	Landon Lloyd Ling (on loan from Kitchee)
29	FW	ESP	Jonathan Carril^{FP} (on loan from Kitchee)

Remarks:
^{FP} These players are registered as foreign players.

Player with dual nationality:

- (Ghana) (Hong Kong) Wisdom Fofo Agbo (Local player)
- (Canada) Landon Lloyd Ling (Local player, eligible to play for Hong Kong national football team)

=== Transfers ===
==== In ====
Squad #	Position	Player	Transferred from	Fee	Date	Team	Source
1	GK	(Spain) Diego Jose Gomez Heredia	(Spain) Terrassa	Undisclosed	6 July 2012	First Team	
3	DF	(Ghana) Wisdom Fofo Agbo	Free Agent	Free transfer		First Team	
5	DF	(Spain) Rubén López García-Madrid	(Spain) Palencia	Undisclosed		First Team	
23	MF	(Spain) Lander Panera Arteagabeitia	(Spain)	Undisclosed		First Team	
25	GK	(Hong Kong) Chiu Yu Ming	(Hong Kong) Wofoo Tai Po	Undisclosed		First Team	
29	FW	(Spain) Jonathan Carril	(Hong Kong) Kitchee	Free transfer	3 October 2012	First Team	

== Stats ==
=== Overall Stats ===
	First Division	Senior Shield	FA Cup	AFC Cup Playoffs	Total Stats
Games played	18	4	2	1	25
Games won	6	2	1	0	9
Games drawn	6	0	0	0	6
Games lost	6	2	1	1	10
Goals for	24	4	2	0	30
Goals against	27	4	4	2	37
Players used	26	18	17	14	27^{1}
Yellow cards	39	12	6	2	59
Red cards	1	0	0	0	1

Last updated: 19 May 2013

Players Used: Southern has used a total of 27 different players in all competitions.

=== Squad Stats ===
				Total				Hong Kong First Division League		Senior Challenge Shield		FA Cup		AFC Cup Play-offs		
N	Pos.	Name	Nat.	GS	App	Gls	Min	App	Gls	App	Gls	App	Gls	App	Gls	Notes
1	GK	Lee Yang Xuan	(Hong Kong)	1	1	-2	90							1	-2	(−) GA
25	GK	Chiu Yu Ming	(Hong Kong)	22	22	-29	1980	16	-21	4	-4	2	-4			(−) GA
30	GK	Cheng Ting Hei	(Hong Kong)													(−) GA
32	GK	Yau Sai Tim	(Hong Kong)													(−) GA
	GK	Diego Jose	(Spain)	2	2	-6	180	2	-6							(−) GA, left the club in October 2012
3	CB	Wisdom Fofo Agbo	(Hong Kong)	23	23		2070	17		4		1		1		
5	CB	Rubén López	(Spain)	25	25	6	2250	18	5	4	1	2		1		
6	RB	Chui Yiu Chung	(Hong Kong)	2	2		127	2								
10	CB	Lam Ho Kwan	(Hong Kong)	10	11		847	7		2		2				
12	LB	Tse Man Wing	(Hong Kong)	11	15		982	11		2		1		1		
13	LB	Ha Shing Chi	(Hong Kong)	15	15		1297	11		3		1				
20	RB	Tsang Chiu Tat	(Hong Kong)	11	12		921	8		3				1		
24	DF	To Philip Michael	(Hong Kong)		3		29	2						1		
26	CB	Lee Sze Ho	(Hong Kong)	8	15		700	11		2		1		1		
7	CM	Chow Ka Wa	(Hong Kong)	15	17	3	1336	11	2	4	1	1		1		
14	MF	Tsang Tsz Hin	(Hong Kong)	1	2		81	2								
15	MF	Chan Cheuk Kwong	(Hong Kong)	12	23	3	1382	18	2	2	1	2		1		
16	CM	Ip Chung Long	(Hong Kong)	16	17	1	1383	14	1	2				1		
17	DM	Chan Ming Kong	(Hong Kong)	6	7		406	5		1		1				
18	MF	Chung Hon Chee	(Hong Kong)	15	18		1244	12		3		2		1		
19	MF	Cheng Chi Wing	(Hong Kong)	4	14		559	8		3		2		1		
21	MF	Kwok Ting Him	(Hong Kong)		1		18	1								
22	MF	Ng Siu Fai	(Hong Kong)	1	7		107	5		1		1				
23	DM	Lander	(Spain)	15	16		1269	10		4		2				
27	LM	Landon Lloyd Ling	(Canada)	13	17	4	1054	12	3	3		2	1			on loan from Kitchee in September 2012
8	FW	Ko Chun	(Hong Kong)		1		44	1								
9	FW	Diego Folgar Toimil	(Spain)	24	24	5	2160	18	5	4		1		1		
11	FW	Paul Ngue	(Cameroon)	4	10	1	488	9	1					1		
28	FW	Steven Fong	(Hong Kong)													
29	FW	Jonathan Carril	(Spain)	19	19	7	1662	13	5	4	1	2	1			joined the club in October 2012

Last updated: 19 May 2013
Ordered by Position
0 shown as blank

=== Top scorers ===
As of 5 May 2013

Place	Position	Nationality	Number	Name	First Division League	Senior Challenge Shield	FA Cup	AFC Cup Play-offs	Total
1	FW	(Spain)	29	Jonathan Carril ^{1}	5(8)	1	1	0	7(10)
2	DF	(Spain)	5	Rubén López García-Madrid	5	1	0	0	6
3	FW	(Spain)	9	Diego Folgar Toimil	5	0	0	0	5
4	MF	(Canada)	27	Landon Lloyd Ling	3	0	1	0	4
=5	MF	(Hong Kong)	7	Chow Ka Wa	2	1	0	0	3
=5	MF	(Hong Kong)	15	Chan Cheuk Kwong	2	1	0	0	3
=7	FW	(Cameroon)	11	Paul Ngue	1	0	0	0	1
=7	MF	(Hong Kong)	16	Ip Chung Long	1	0	0	0	1
TOTALS					24	4	2	0	30

Remarks:
^{1} Jonathan Carril scored 3 goals for Kitchee before joining Southern District in October 2012.

=== Disciplinary record ===
As of 19 May 2013

Number	Nationality	Position	Name	First Division League		Senior Challenge Shield		FA Cup		AFC Cup Play-offs		Total	
Number	Nationality	Position	Name	Yellow card	Red card	Yellow card	Red card	Yellow card	Red card	Yellow card	Red card	Yellow card	Red card
3	(Ghana) (Hong Kong)	DF	Wisdom Fofo Agbo	2	0	2	0	0	0	0	0	4	0
5	(Spain)	DF	Rubén López García-Madrid	3	0	1	0	0	0	0	0	4	0
6	(Hong Kong)	DF	Chui Yiu Chung	2	0	0	0	0	0	0	0	2	0
9	(Spain)	FW	Diego Folgar Toimil	6	0	2	0	0	0	0	0	8	0
12	(Hong Kong)	DF	Tse Man Wing	2	0	0	0	0	0	1	0	3	0
13	(Hong Kong)	DF	Ha Shing Chi	2	0	0	0	0	0	0	0	2	0
15	(Hong Kong)	MF	Chan Cheuk Kwong	3	0	0	0	1	0	0	0	4	0
16	(Hong Kong)	MF	Ip Chung Long	2	0	1	0	0	0	1	0	4	0
17	(Hong Kong)	MF	Chan Ming Kong	0	1	0	0	1	0	0	0	1	1
18	(Hong Kong)	MF	Chung Hon Chee	1	0	0	0	0	0	0	0	1	0
19	(Hong Kong)	MF	Cheng Chi Wing	1	0	0	0	2	0	0	0	3	0
20	(Hong Kong)	DF	Tsang Chiu Tat	2	0	0	0	0	0	0	0	2	0
22	(Hong Kong)	MF	Ng Siu Fai	1	0	0	0	0	0	0	0	1	0
23	(Spain)	MF	Lander Panera Arteagabeitia	1	0	2	0	1	0	0	0	4	0
25	(Hong Kong)	GK	Chiu Yu Ming	2	0	1	0	0	0	0	0	3	0
27	(Canada)	MF	Landon Lloyd Ling	5	0	2	0	0	0	0	0	7	0
29	(Spain)	FW	Jonathan Carril	4	0	1	0	1	0	0	0	6	0
TOTALS				39	1	12	0	6	0	2	0	59	1

=== Captains ===
No.	P	Name	Country	No. games	Notes
3	DF	Wisdom Fofo Agbo	(Ghana)	21	Club captain
5	DF	Rubén López	(Spain)	2	Club vice captain
17	MF	Chan Ming Kong	(Hong Kong)	2	

Last updated: 19 May 2013
Source: Competitive match reports.
Competitive matches only
Matches started as captain only
Country: FIFA nationality; No.: Squad number; P: Position; Name: Player name; No. Games: Number of games started as captain.

== Competitions ==
=== Overall ===
Competition	Started round	Final position / round	First match	Last match
Hong Kong First Division League	—	4th	1 September 2012	5 May 2013
Senior Challenge Shield	Quarter-finals	Semi-finals	28 October 2012	6 January 2013
FA Cup	1st round	1st round	26 December 2012	12 January 2013
Hong Kong AFC Cup play-offs	Semi-finals	Semi-finals	19 May 2013	19 May 2013

Updated to match played 19 May 2013
Source: Competitions

=== First Division League ===
==== Classification ====
Pos	Team	Pld	W	D	L	GF	GA	GD	Pts	Qualification or relegation
2	Kitchee	18	9	5	4	39	23	+16	32	2014 AFC Cup (Note: Kitchee won the 2012–13 Hong Kong Season play-off and thus qualified for the 2014 AFC Cup Group stage.)
3	Tuen Mun	18	8	4	6	29	31	−2	28	2012–13 Hong Kong Season play-off (Note: Southern qualified for the play-offs as Kitchee defeated Sun Pegasus in the FA Cup while they have guaranteed a place for the play-offs, meaning the league 4th place qualifies.)
4	Southern	18	6	6	6	24	27	−3	24	2012–13 Hong Kong Season play-off
5	Sun Pegasus	18	4	9	5	35	29	+6	21	
6	Hong Kong Rangers	18	5	5	8	32	52	−20	20 (Note: HKR 3–3 CIT, HKR 2–2 SUN, HKR 1–1 YHK; CIT 2–3 HKR, CIT 1–2 SUN, CIT 3–0 YHK; SUN 2–2 HKR, SUN 1–1 CIT, SUN 1–1 YHK; YHK 2–4 HKR, YHK 1–1 CIT, YHK 2–0 SUN)	

Updated to match(es) played on 26 May 2013. Source:
Rules for classification: 1) points; 2) head-to-head points; 3) head-to-head goal difference; 4) head-to-head goals scored; 5) goal difference; 6) number of goals scored.

==== Results summary ====
Overall								Home						Away					
Pld	W	D	L	GF	GA	GD	Pts	W	D	L	GF	GA	GD	W	D	L	GF	GA	GD
18	6	6	6	24	27	−3	24	5	3	1	18	12	+6	1	3	5	6	15	−9

Last updated: 5 May 2013.

==== Results by round ====
Round	1	2	3	4	5	6	7	8	9	10	11	12	13	14	15	16	17	18
Ground	A	A	A	H	H	A	H	H	A	A	H	A	H	A	H	A	H	H
Result	L	L	L	D	D	D	W	W	D	D	W	L	L	W	W	L	W	D
Position	8	10	10	10	10	10	9	7	7	7	5	5	6	5	4	4	4	4

Updated to match(es) played on 5 May 2013. Source:
A = Away; H = Home; W = Win; D = Draw; L = Loss

== Matches ==
Win Draw Loss Void

=== Pre-season ===
27 July 2012	Southern	1 – 2	Yokohama FC Hong Kong	Wong Tai Sin, Kowloon
				Stadium: Po Kong Village Road Park

2 August 2012	Shenzhen Fengpeng	1 – 1	Southern	Shenzhen, China

6 August 2012	Citizen	1 – 1	Southern	Happy Valley, Hong Kong Island
16:30 (GMT+8)				Stadium: Happy Valley Recreation Ground

9 August 2012	Yuen Long	0 – 0	Southern	Tsing Yi, New Territories
21:30 (GMT+8)				Stadium: Tsing Yi Northeast Park

14 August 2012	Southern	0 – 0	Sun Pegasus	Shek Kip Mei, Kowloon
15:00 (GMT+8)				Stadium: Shek Kip Mei Park

18 August 2012	Shenzhen Yinwu	2 – 1	Southern	Sanshui District, Guangdong, China

19 August 2012	Panyu Mingzhu	1 – 2	Southern	Sanshui District, Guangdong, China

20 August 2012	Guangdong U18	0 – 4	Southern	Sanshui District, Guangdong, China

23 August 2012	Sham Shui Po	0 – 6	Southern	Sham Shui Po, Kowloon
19:00 (GMT+8)				Stadium: Sham Shui Po Sports Ground

=== Competitive ===
==== First Division League ====
1 September 2012 Week 1	Biu Chun Rangers	3 – 1	Southern	Sham Shui Po, Kowloon
14:30 (GMT+8)	Komar 22'; Chak Ting Fung (yellow card) 38'; Giovane 44' (pen.); Saric 90+4'	Report	1' Dieguito; (yellow card) 44' Tsang Chiu Tat	Stadium: Sham Shui Po Sports Ground (Capatity:2,194); Attendance: 595; Referee: Wong Chi Tang, Charlton; Assistant referees: Poon Ming Fai, Lam Shing Yan; Fourth official: Ng Kai Lam

8 September 2012 Week 2	Tuen Mun	3 – 0	Southern	Tuen Mun, New Territories
14:30 (GMT+8)	Daniel 9', 66' (yellow card) 69'; Yip Tsz Chun (yellow card) 46'; Beto 57'; Kwok Wing Sun (yellow card) 74'; Li Haiqiang (yellow card) 85'	Report	(yellow card) 27' (yellow-red card) 49' Chan Ming Kong	Stadium: Tuen Mun Tang Siu Kin Sports Ground (Capatity:2,200); Attendance: 714; Referee: Ng Kai Lam; Assistant referees: Chan Shui Hung, Yu Chun San; Fourth official: Chan Ming Siu

13 September 2012 Week 3	Kitchee	3 – 0	Southern	Tseung Kwan O, New Territories
20:00 (GMT+8)	Lam Ka Wai 17'; Cheng Siu Wai 76'; Tsang Kam To 87'	Report	(yellow card) 43' Fofo	Stadium: Tseung Kwan O Sports Ground (Capatity:3,500); Attendance: 601; Referee: Cheng Oi Cho; Assistant referees: Lam Chi Ho, Lam Nai Kei; Fourth official: Luk Kin Sun

29 September 2012 Week 4	Southern	2 – 2	Wofoo Tai Po	Aberdeen, Hong Kong Island
14:30 (GMT+8)	Chui Yiu Chung (yellow card) 12'; Landon (yellow card) 42' (goal) 54'; Rubén López 86'	Report	21' Alex; 23' Annan	Stadium: Aberdeen Sports Ground (Capatity:4,000^{1}); Attendance: 803; Referee: Liu Kwok Man; Assistant referees: Ho Wai Sing, Poon Ming Fai; Fourth official: Sarao, Amarjit Singh

6 October 2012 Week 5	Southern	3 – 3	Sun Pegasus	Aberdeen, Hong Kong Island
14:30 (GMT+8)	Carril 23'; Rubén López 75'; Chow Ka Wa 78'; Landon Ling (yellow card) 80'	Report	28', 73' Ju Yingzhi; 39' Ng Wai Chiu	Stadium: Aberdeen Sports Ground (Capatity:4,000^{1}); Attendance: 403; Referee: Cheng Oi Cho; Assistant referees: Chan Shui Hung, Lam Shing Yan, Franky; Fourth official: Yu Kin Fung

20 October 2012 Week 6	South China	0 – 0	Southern	So Kon Po, Hong Kong Island
17:30 (GMT+8)	Tse (yellow card) 33'	Report	(yellow card) 49' Ip Chung Long; (yellow card) 57' Carril; (yellow card) 74' Rubén López; (yellow card) 90+4' Tsui Yiu Chung	Stadium: Hong Kong Stadium (Capatity:40,000); Attendance: 1,476; Referee: Tong Kui Sum; Assistant referees: Cheng Oi Cho, Poon Ming Fai; Fourth official: Lam Nai Kei

3 November 2012 Week 7	Southern	3 – 1	Citizen	Aberdeen, Hong Kong Island
14:30 (GMT+8)	Dieguito 22' (yellow card) 61'; Landon Ling 44' (yellow card) 50'; Carril (yellow card) 55' (goal) 69'; Chan Cheuk Kwong (yellow card) 83'	Report	2' Hélio; (yellow card) 77' Chiu Chun Kit; (yellow card) 89' Henry	Stadium: Aberdeen Sports Ground (Capatity:4,000^{1}); Attendance: 385; Referee: Ng Chiu Kok; Assistant referees: Chan Shui Hung, Poon Ming Fai; Fourth official: Sarao, Amarjit Singh

10 November 2012 Week 8	Southern	2 – 1	Sunray Cave JC Sun Hei	Aberdeen, Hong Kong Island
14:30 (GMT+8)	Landon Ling 18' (yellow card) 47'; Ip Chung Long 70'	Report	(yellow card) 44' Barry; (yellow card) 64' Diaz; (yellow card) 82' Cheung Chi Yung; 88' Leung Tsz Chun; (yellow card) 90+1' Pak Wing Chak; (yellow card) 90+3' Cheung Kin Fung	Stadium: Aberdeen Sports Ground (Capatity:4,000^{1}); Attendance: 523; Referee: Chan Shui Hung; Assistant referees: Chow Chun Kit, Luk Kin Sun; Fourth official: Lam Shing Yan Franky

22 December 2012 Week 9	Yokohama FC Hong Kong	0 – 0	Southern	Siu Sai Wan, Hong Kong Island
14:30 (GMT+8)	Mijanović (yellow card) 69'	Report	(yellow card) 29' Tsang Chiu Tat; (yellow card) 88' Dieguito	Stadium: Siu Sai Wan Sports Ground (Capatity:12,000); Attendance: 549; Referee: Cheng Oi Cho; Assistant referees: Lam Chi Ho, Liu Kwok Man; Fourth official: Yau Tsz Yeung

19 January 2013 Week 10	Sun Pegasus	1 – 1	Southern	Yuen Long, New Territories
17:30 (GMT+8)	Lee Wai Lun (yellow card) 34'; Xu Deshuai (yellow card) 39' (goal) 88'	Report	(yellow card) 7' Lander; 33' Dieguito; (yellow card) 39' Landon Ling	Stadium: Yuen Long Stadium (Capatity:4,932); Attendance: 460; Referee: Tong Kui Sum; Assistant referees: Chung Ming Sang, Amarjit Singh Sarao; Fourth official: Cheng Oi Cho

2 February 2013 Week 11	Southern	1 – 0	Yokohama FC Hong Kong	Aberdeen, Hong Kong Island
14:30 (GMT+8)	Carril 6' (yellow card) 90+4'; Fofo (yellow card) 70'; Chan Cheuk Kwong (yellow card) 78'; Chiu Yu Ming (yellow card) 84'; Cheng Chi Wing (yellow card) 87'	Report	(yellow card) 28' Law Chun Bong; (yellow card) 66' Chan Siu Kwan; (yellow card) 88' Leung Kwok Wai; (yellow card) 90+3' Leung Kwun Chung; (yellow card) 90+5' Mijanović	Stadium: Aberdeen Sports Ground (Capatity:4,000^{1}); Attendance: 487; Referee: Ho Wai Sing; Assistant referees: Chan Shui Hung, Lam Nai Kei; Fourth official: Yu Chun San

23 February 2013 Week 12	Sunray Cave JC Sun Hei	3 – 2	Southern	Mong Kok, Kowloon
17:30 (GMT+8)	Leung Tsz Chun 4' (pen.), 79' (pen.) (yellow card) 90+5'; Díaz (yellow card) 29'; Kilama (yellow card) 43'; Yeung Chi Lun (yellow card) 70'; Kot Cho Wai 75' (yellow card) 76'; Su Yang (yellow card) 90'	Report	(yellow card) 4' Chiu Yu Ming; (yellow card) 27' Dieguito; 45+1' (yellow card) 90+7' Rubén; 53' (yellow card) 65' Carril; (yellow card) 88' Ip Chung Long	Stadium: Mong Kok Stadium (Capatity:6,680); Attendance: 732; Referee: Ng Kai Lam; Assistant referees: Tong Kui Sum, Yu Chun San; Fourth official: Lui Siu Chuen

2 March 2013 Week 13	Southern	0 – 1	Kitchee	Aberdeen, Hong Kong Island
14:30 (GMT+8)		Report	(yellow card) 9' Dani; 27' Lo Kwan Yee; (yellow card) 89' Wang Zhenpeng	Stadium: Aberdeen Sports Ground (Capatity:4,000^{1}); Attendance: 546; Referee: Ho Wai Sing; Assistant referees: Lui Siu Chuen, Lam Chi Ho; Fourth official: Luk Kin Sun

16 March 2013 Week 14	Citizen	0 – 1	Southern	Mong Kok, Kowloon
17:30 (GMT+8)	Gustavo (yellow card) 16'; Chiu Chun Kit (yellow card) 22'; Sandro (yellow card) 24'; Chan Hin Kwong (yellow card) 41'; Tse Tak Him (yellow card) 66'; Nakamura (yellow card) 73'; Campion (yellow card) 83'	Report	23' (pen.) (yellow card) 71' Carril; (yellow card) 30' Chung Hon Chee; (yellow card) 44' Tse Man Wing	Stadium: Mong Kok Stadium (Capatity:6,680); Attendance: 639; Referee: Ng Chiu Kok; Assistant referees: Lam Chi Ho, Tang Hing Fu; Fourth official: Yu Chun San

30 March 2013 Week 15	Southern	3 – 1	Biu Chun Rangers	Aberdeen, Hong Kong Island
14:30 (GMT+8)	Rubén 9' (yellow card) 60'; Ngue 77'; Dieguito 82'	Report	(yellow card) 41' Akosah; (yellow card) 60' Lam Hok Hei; (yellow card) 67' Lau Nim Yat; 87' Giovane	Stadium: Aberdeen Sports Ground (Capatity:4,000^{1}); Attendance: 301; Referee: Chan Shui Hung; Assistant referees: Poon Ming Fai, Luk Kin Sun; Fourth official: Cheng Oi Cho

13 April 2013 Week 16	Wofoo Tai Po	2 – 1	Southern	Tai Po, New Territories
14:30 (GMT+8)	Alex 44'; Clayton 45+4'; Annan (yellow card) 90'	Report	(yellow card) 4' (goal) 9' Chan Cheuk Kwong; (yellow card) 32' Tse Man Wing; (yellow card) 80' Dieguito; (yellow card) 90+2' Ha Shing Chi	Stadium: Tai Po Sports Ground (Capatity:3,000); Attendance: 758; Referee: Ho Wai Sing; Assistant referees: Chow Chun Kit, Luk Kin Sun; Fourth official: Yau Ho Fai Leo

20 April 2013 Week 17	Southern	3 – 2	South China	Aberdeen, Hong Kong Island
14:30 (GMT+8)	Chan Cheuk Kwong 41'; Rubén 60'; Chow Ka Wa 68'	Report	25' (o.g.) Chung Hon Chee; (yellow card) 35' (goal) 64' Celin; (yellow card) 50' (yellow-red card) 89' Lee Chi Ho; (yellow card) 72' Chan Wai Ho	Stadium: Aberdeen Sports Ground (Capatity:4,000^{1}); Attendance: 1,058; Referee: Tong Kui Sum; Assistant referees: Lam Nai Kei, Yau Ho Fai Leo; Fourth official: Ng Kai Lam

5 May 2013 Week 18	Southern	1 – 1	Tuen Mun	Aberdeen, Hong Kong Island
14:30 (GMT+8)	Dieguito 35' (yellow card) 43'; Ng Siu Fai (yellow card) 82'	Report	(yellow card) 52' Diego; 89' Cheung Chi Fung	Stadium: Aberdeen Sports Ground (Capatity:4,000^{1}); Attendance: 490; Referee: Cheng Oi Cho; Assistant referees: Chan Shui Hung, Lau Fong Hei; Fourth official: Tang Hing Fu

==== Senior Challenge Shield ====
===== Quarter-finals =====
28 October 2012 1st leg	Southern	0 – 1	Sun Pegasus	Aberdeen, Hong Kong Island
14:30(GMT+8)	Dieguito (yellow card) 29'	Report	(yellow card) 43' Lee Wai Lun; (yellow card) 75' Ng Wai Chiu; 90+3' Thiago	Stadium: Aberdeen Sports Ground (Capacity: 9,000); Attendance: 349; Referee: Ng Kai Lam; Assistant referees: Chan Shui Hung, Yu Chun San; Fourth official: Sarao, Amarjit Singh

24 November 2012 2nd leg	Sun Pegasus	0 – 2 (1 – 2 agg.)	Southern	Yuen Long, New Territories
17:30(GMT+8)	McKee (yellow card) 37'; Mbome (yellow card) 51'; Thiago (yellow card) 78'; Xu Deshuai (yellow card) 83'	Report	27' Chow Ka Wa; (yellow card) 32' Lander; 75' Carril; (yellow card) 90+1' Landon Ling; (yellow card) 90+3' Ip Chung Long	Stadium: Yuen Long Stadium (Capacity: 4,932); Attendance: 406; Referee: Ng Chiu Kok; Assistant referees: Ho Wai Sing, Yu Chun San; Fourth official: Luk Kin Sun

===== Semi-finals =====
16 December 2012 1st leg	Southern	1 – 0	Wofoo Tai Po	Tsing Yi, New Territories
14:30(GMT+8)	Fofo (yellow card) 24'; Lander (yellow card) 58'; Rubén López 69'; Dieguito (yellow card) 90+4'	Report	(yellow card) 74' To Hon To; (yellow card) 88' Clayton	Stadium: Tsing Yi Sports Ground (Capacity: 1,500); Attendance: 533; Referee: Ho Wai Sing; Assistant referees: Tong Kui Sum, Poon Ming Fai; Fourth official: Yu Chun San

6 January 2013 2nd leg	Wofoo Tai Po	3 – 1 (3 – 2 agg.)	Southern	Tai Po, New Territories
14:30(GMT+8)	Aender 2' (yellow card) 83'; Alex 15' (pen.); To Hon To 53' (yellow card) 57'; Lui Chi Hing (yellow card) 90+3'; Li Hon Ho (yellow card) 90+4'	Report	(yellow card) 13' Fofo; (yellow card) 14' Chiu Yu Ming; (yellow card) 33' Rubén López; (yellow card) 36' Carril; (yellow card) 55' Landon Ling; 75' Chan Cheuk Kwong	Stadium: Tai Po Sports Ground (Capacity: 3,000); Attendance: 956; Referee: Cheng Oi Cho; Assistant referees: Chan Shui Hung, Yu Chun San; Fourth official: Lam Shing Yan Franky

==== FA Cup ====
===== First round =====
26 December 2012 1st leg	Wofoo Tai Po	3 – 0	Southern	Kowloon Bay, Kowloon
17:30(GMT+8)	Annan 28', 60', 66'	Report	(yellow card) 49' Chan Ming Kong; (yellow card) 90' Cheng Chi Wing	Stadium: Kowloon Bay Park^{2} (Capacity: 1,200); Attendance: 273; Referee: Tong Kui Sum; Assistant referees: Lam Chi Ho, Yu Kin Fung; Fourth official: Yu Chun San

12 January 2013 2nd leg	Southern	2 – 1 (2 – 4 agg.)	Wofoo Tai Po	Aberdeen, Hong Kong Island
14:30(GMT+8)	Carril 14' (pen.) (yellow card) 70'; Lander (yellow card) 24'; Chan Cheuk Kwong (yellow card) 34'; Cheng Chi Ying (yellow card) 41'; Landon 55'	Report	7' Annan	Stadium: Aberdeen Sports Ground (Capacity: 4,000^{1}); Attendance: 325; Referee: Ng Chiu Kok; Assistant referees: Ho Wai Sing, Chan Ming Siu; Fourth official: Yu Chun San

==== Hong Kong AFC Cup play-offs ====
19 May 2013 Semi-finals	Kitchee	2 – 0	Southern	Mong Kok, Kowloon
16:00 (GMT+8)	Yago 7' (yellow card) 28'; Matt Lam 81'	Report	(yellow card) 71' Tse Man Wing; (yellow card) 73' Ip Chung Long	Stadium: Mong Kok Stadium (Capatity:6,680); Attendance: 1,255; Referee: Ho Wai Sing; Assistant referees: Chow Chun Kit, Yu Chun San; Fourth official: Luk Kin Sun

Remarks:
^{1} The capacity of Aberdeen Sports Ground is originally 9,000, but only the 4,000-seated main stand is opened for football match.
^{2} Wofoo Tai Po's home match against Southern of FA Cup first round will be played at Kowloon Bay Park instead of Wofoo Tai Po's home ground Tai Po Sports Ground.
