= 2012–13 Citizen AA season =

Citizen AA
2012–13 season
- Chairman: Pui Kwan Kay
- Coach: Chu Kwok Kuen
- Home ground: Mong Kok Stadium
- League: 8th
- Senior Shield: Runner-up
- FA Cup: First round
- Top goalscorer: League: Yuto Nakamura (7); All: Yuto Nakamura (9)
- Highest home attendance: 3,220 (5 January 2013 vs South China, Senior Shield)
- Lowest home attendance: 264 (17 November 2012 vs Sunray Cave JC Sun Hei, Senior Shield)
- Average home league attendance: 1,190 (in all competitions)
Home colours	Away colours

The 2012–13 season is Citizen AA's 9th season in football in Hong Kong First Division League. Citizen AA will seek to win a trophy for a season, as they failed to defend the Senior Challenge Shield trophy. The club will also be competing in the Senior Challenge Shield and the FA Cup.

== Key Events ==
- 9 June 2012: Hong Kong defender Chan Hin Kwong joins Citizen from Tuen Mun for an undisclosed fee.
- 10 August 2012: Nigerian forward Kelvin Orieke Mba joins Citizen for free.
- 27 January 2013: Citizen was defeated by Wofoo Tai Po in the final of the Senior Shield as they lost 3–5 in penalties after a 2–2 tie after 90 minutes and extra time.

== Players ==
=== First team ===
As of 27 January 2013.

Note: Flags indicate national team as defined under FIFA eligibility rules; some limited exceptions apply. Players may hold more than one non-FIFA nationality.

No.	Pos.	Nation	Player
2	DF	HKG	Wong Yiu Fu
4	FW	HKG	Sham Kwok Fai
5	MF	BRA	Gustavo Claudio da Silva^{FP}
7	MF	NGR	Festus Baise (captain)
8	MF	HKG	So Loi Keung
9	FW	BRA	Sandro^{FP}
10	FW	JPN	Yuto Nakamura^{FP}
11	DF	HKG	Michael Campion
12	DF	HKG	Ma Ka Ki
13	FW	NGR	Kelvin Orieke Mba^{NR}
15	MF	GHA	Moses Mensah
16	MF	HKG	Tam Lok Hin
17	GK	HKG	Liu Fu Yuen

No.	Pos.	Nation	Player
18	FW	HKG	Sham Kwok Keung
19	FW	BRA	Paulinho Piracicaba^{FP}
20	MF	HKG	Si Boris Chiho
21	FW	CHN	Yuan Yang
23	DF	BRA	Hélio^{FP}
25	MF	HKG	Young Ho Wang
26	DF	HKG	Chan Sze Chun
27	DF	HKG	Chan Hin Kwong
28	DF	HKG	Chiu Chun Kit
29	GK	HKG	Tse Tak Him
30	FW	BRA	Detinho^{FP}
31	FW	GHA	Okwara Henry Baise^{FP}
39	GK	HKG	Shum Kenrick

Remarks:
^{NR} Player is not registered and therefore ineligible to play any local matches.
^{FP} These players are registered as foreign players.

Players with dual nationality:

- (Nigeria) (Hong Kong) Festus Baise (Local player)
- (Ghana) (Hong Kong) Moses Mensah (Local player)
- (Hong Kong) (China) Yuan Yang (Local player)

=== Transfers ===
==== In ====
Squad #	Position	Player	Transferred from	Fee	Date	Team	Source
27	DF	(Hong Kong) Chan Hin Kwong	Tuen Mun	Undisclosed	19 July 2012	First Team	
31	FW	(Ghana) Okwara Henry Baise	Wing Yee	Undisclosed		First Team	
39	GK	(Hong Kong) Shum Kenrick	Youth Team	N/A		First Team	
20	DF	(Hong Kong) Si Boris Chiho	Youth Team	N/A		First Team	

==== Out ====
Squad #	Position	Player	Transferred to	Fee	Date	Source
17	MF	(Hong Kong) Fung Kai Hong	Sun Pegasus	Free transfer	19 July 2012	
6	MF	(Hong Kong) Yeung Chi Lun	Biu Chun Rangers			
11	DF	(Hong Kong) Law Chun Bong	Yokohama FC Hong Kong			

== Stats ==
=== Squad Stats ===
				Total				Hong Kong First Division League		Senior Challenge Shield		FA Cup		
N	Pos.	Name	Nat.	GS	App	Gls	Min	App	Gls	App	Gls	App	Gls	Notes
17	GK	Liu Fu Yuen	(Hong Kong)	2	2	-5	180			1		1	-5	(−) GA
29	GK	Tse Tak Him	(Hong Kong)	25	25	-35	2280	18	-27	6	-6	1	-2	(−) GA
39	GK	Shum Kenrick	(Hong Kong)											(−) GA
2	LB	Wong Yiu Fu	(Hong Kong)	13	20		1253	14		4		2		
4	RB	Sham Kwok Fai	(Hong Kong)	25	25	1	2243	16	1	7		2		
15	LB	Moses Mensah	(Ghana)	1	4		140	4						
23	CB	Hélio	(Brazil)	25	25	2	2300	16	2	7		2		
25	DF	Young Ho Wang	(Hong Kong)		2		26			1		1		
26	CB	Chan Sze Chun	(Hong Kong)	1	1		90	1						
27	LB	Chan Hin Kwong	(Hong Kong)	13	13		1094	7		6				
28	CB	Chiu Chun Kit	(Hong Kong)	21	24		1861	18		5		1		
5	CM	Gustavo	(Brazil)	11	11		871	9		1		1		joined in January 2013
7	DM	Festus Baise	(Nigeria)	26	26	7	2314	18	5	7	2	1		
8	CM	So Loi Keung	(Hong Kong)	16	18	2	1411	13		3	2	2		
11	DM	Michael Campion	(Hong Kong)	20	21	2	1876	13	1	7	1	1		
16	AM	Tam Lok Hin	(Hong Kong)	26	26	2	2188	17	1	7	1	2		
19	MF	Paulinho Piracicaba	(Brazil)	7	10	2	594	4		5	2	1		
20	CM	Si Boris Chiho	(Hong Kong)	1	10	1	163	7		2	1	1		
31	DF	Okwara Henry Baise	(Ghana)	2	7		181	3		2		2		
9	FW	Sandro	(Brazil)	10	10	2	769	9	1			1	1	joined in January 2013
10	FW	Yuto Nakamura	(Japan)	23	23	9	1966	17	7	5	2	1		
13	FW	Kelvin Orieke Mba	(Nigeria)	1	3		62	2				1		
18	FW	Sham Kwok Keung	(Hong Kong)	15	20	6	1446	11	5	7	1	2		
21	FW	Yuan Yeng	(China)	13	17	2	997	8		7	2	2		
30	FW	Detinho	(Brazil)		21	8	765	15	6	6	2			

Last updated: 4 May 2013
Ordered by Position
0 shown as blank

=== Top scorers ===
As of 4 May 2013

Place	Position	Nationality	Number	Name	First Division League	Senior Challenge Shield	FA Cup	Total
1	FW	(Japan)	10	Yuto Nakamura	7	2	0	9
2	FW	(Brazil)	30	Detinho	6	2	0	8
3	MF	(Nigeria) (Hong Kong)	7	Festus Baise	5	2	0	7
4	FW	(Hong Kong)	18	Sham Kwok Keung	5	1	0	6
=5	MF	(Hong Kong)	8	So Loi Keung	0	2	0	2
=5	FW	(Brazil)	9	Sandro	1	0	1	2
=5	MF	(Hong Kong)	11	Michael Campion	1	1	0	2
=5	MF	(Hong Kong)	16	Tam Lok Hin	1	1	0	2
=5	MF	(Brazil)	19	Paulinho Piracicaba	0	2	0	2
=5	FW	(Hong Kong) (China)	21	Yuan Yang	0	2	0	2
=5	DF	(Brazil)	23	Hélio	2	0	0	2
=11	DF	(Hong Kong)	4	Sham Kwok Fai	1	0	0	1
=11	MF	(Hong Kong)	20	Si Boris Chiho	0	1	0	1
				Own Goals	2	0	0	1
TOTALS					31	16	1	48

=== Disciplinary record ===
As of 14 April 2013

Number	Nationality	Position	Name	First Division League		Senior Challenge Shield		FA Cup		Total	
Number	Nationality	Position	Name	Yellow card	Red card	Yellow card	Red card	Yellow card	Red card	Yellow card	Red card
2	(Hong Kong)	DF	Wong Yiu Fu	1	0	0	0	1	0	2	0
4	(Hong Kong)	DF	Sham Kwok Fai	3	0	2	0	0	0	5	0
5	(Brazil)	MF	Gustavo Silva	3	0	0	0	0	0	3	0
7	(Nigeria) (Hong Kong)	MF	Festus Baise	4	0	1	0	0	0	5	0
8	(Hong Kong)	MF	So Loi Keung	3	0	2	0	0	0	5	0
9	(Brazil)	FW	Sandro	3	0	0	0	0	0	3	0
10	(Japan)	FW	Yuto Nakamura	3	0	0	0	0	0	3	0
11	(Hong Kong)	MF	Michael Campion	2	0	2	0	1	0	5	0
16	(Hong Kong)	MF	Tam Lok Hin	2	0	1	0	0	0	3	0
18	(Hong Kong)	FW	Sham Kwok Keung	1	0	3	0	0	0	4	0
19	(Brazil)	FW	Paulinho Piracicaba	1	0	1	0	1	0	3	0
21	(China)	FW	Yuan Yang	0	0	1	0	0	0	1	0
23	(Brazil)	DF	Hélio	6	0	1	0	1	0	8	0
27	(Hong Kong)	DF	Chan Hin Kwong	4	0	1	0	0	0	5	0
28	(Hong Kong)	DF	Chiu Chun Kit	3	0	0	0	0	1	3	1
29	(Hong Kong)	GK	Tse Tak Him	1	0	0	0	0	0	1	0
30	(Brazil)	FW	Detinho	1	0	0	0	0	0	1	0
31	(Ghana)	FW	Okwara Henry Baise	1	0	1	0	1	0	3	0
TOTALS				42	0	17	0	5	1	64	1

== Competitions ==
=== Overall ===
Competition	Started round	Final position / round	First match	Last match
Hong Kong First Division League	—	8th	31 August 2012	4 May 2013
Senior Challenge Shield	1st round	Runner-up	22 September 2012	27 January 2013
FA Cup	1st round	1st round	26 December 2012	13 January 2013

Updated to match played 4 May 2013
Source: Competitions

=== First Division League ===
==== Classification ====
Pos	Team	Pld	W	D	L	GF	GA	GD	Pts	Qualification or relegation
6	Hong Kong Rangers	18	5	5	8	32	52	−20	20 (Note: HKR 3–3 CIT, HKR 2–2 SUN, HKR 1–1 YHK; CIT 2–3 HKR, CIT 1–2 SUN, CIT 3–0 YHK; SUN 2–2 HKR, SUN 1–1 CIT, SUN 1–1 YHK; YHK 2–4 HKR, YHK 1–1 CIT, YHK 2–0 SUN)	
7	Sunray Cave JC Sun Hei	18	4	8	6	26	33	−7	20	
8	Citizen	18	5	5	8	31	27	+4	20	
9	Yokohama FC Hong Kong	18	4	8	6	25	34	−9	20	
10	Wofoo Tai Po (Note: Wofoo Tai Po won the 2012–13 Hong Kong Senior Challenge Shield and thus qualified for the 2012–13 Hong Kong Season play-off along with Southern District whom qualified due to Kitchee winning the FA Cup along with coming runners up in the league.) (R)	18	4	7	7	34	44	−10	19	2012–13 Hong Kong Season play-off and relegation to the 2013–14 Hong Kong Second Division League

Updated to match(es) played on 26 May 2013. Source:
Rules for classification: 1) points; 2) head-to-head points; 3) head-to-head goal difference; 4) head-to-head goals scored; 5) goal difference; 6) number of goals scored.
(R) Relegated

==== Results summary ====
Overall								Home						Away					
Pld	W	D	L	GF	GA	GD	Pts	W	D	L	GF	GA	GD	W	D	L	GF	GA	GD
18	5	5	8	31	27	+4	20	4	1	4	16	11	+5	1	4	4	15	16	−1

Last updated: 4 May 2013.

==== Results by round ====
Round	1	2	3	4	5	6	7	8	9	10	11	12	13	14	15	16	17	18
Ground	H	A	A	H	H	H	A	H	A	A	H	A	H	H	A	A	A	H
Result	D	L	L	W	L	W	L	W	D	D	L	L	L	L	W	D	D	W
Position	6	8	8	8	8	5	6	5	5	5	6	7	9	10	8	9	10	8

Updated to match(es) played on 4 May 2013. Source:
A = Away; H = Home; W = Win; D = Draw; L = Loss

== Matches ==
Win Draw Loss Void

=== Pre-season ===
14 August 2012	Citizen (Hong Kong)	2 – 1	(Hong Kong) Sunray Cave JC Sun Hei	Wong Tai Sin, Kowloon, Hong Kong
13:00 (GMT+8)	Sham Kwok Keung; Paulinho		Goal	Stadium: Po Kong Village Park

=== Competitive ===
==== First Division League ====
1 September 2012 Week 1	Citizen	0 – 0	Tuen Mun	Mong Kok, Kowloon
17:30 (GMT+8)	Sham Kwok Fai (yellow card) 21'; Detinho (yellow card) 63'	Report	(yellow card) 67' Yip Tsz Chun; (yellow card) 86' Mauricio	Stadium: Mong Kok Stadium (Capatity:6,680); Attendance: 1,023; Referee: Liu Kwok Man; Assistant referees: Chan Shui Hung, Ho Wai Sing; Fourth official: Lam Chi Ho

6 September 2012 Week 2	Kitchee	3 – 2	Citizen	Tseung Kwan O, New Territories
20:00 (GMT+8)	Cheng Siu Wai 59'; Lo Kwan Yee 66'; Lo Chi Kwan (yellow card) 85'; Carril 90' (pen.)	Report	4', 83' Nakamura; (yellow card) 52' Campion; (yellow card) 88' So Loi Keung; (yellow card) 90' Chiu Chun Kit; (yellow card) 90' Hélio	Stadium: Tseung Kwan O Sports Ground (Capatity:3,500); Attendance: 733; Referee: Wong Chi Tang, Charlton; Assistant referees: Liu Kwok Man, Chung Ming Sang; Fourth official: Lam Shing Yan, Franky

15 September 2012 Week 3	South China	2 – 1	Citizen	So Kon Po, Hong Kong Island
17:30 (GMT+8)	Lee Chi Ho (yellow card) 47' (goal) 52'; Itaparica 77'; Ticão (yellow card) 79'; Bai He (yellow card) 81'; Sealy (yellow card) 88'; Cheng Lai Hin (yellow card) 90'	Report	59' (o.g.) Itaparica; (yellow card) 81' So Loi Keung; (yellow card) 89' Paulinho	Stadium: Hong Kong Stadium (Capatity:40,000); Attendance: 2,005; Referee: Tong Kui Sum; Assistant referees: Ng Chiu Kok, Ho Wai Sing; Fourth official: Lam Shing Yan, Franky

1 October 2012 Week 4	Citizen	2 – 1	Sun Pegasus	Mong Kok, Kowloon
14:30 (GMT+8)	Detinho 75'; Sham Kwok Keung 78'	Report	31' McKee; (yellow card) 88' Mbome	Stadium: Mong Kok Stadium (Capatity:6,680); Attendance: 1,094; Referee: Tong Kui Sum; Assistant referees: Lam Nai Kei, Ho Wai Sing; Fourth official: Ng Kai Lam

5 October 2012 Week 5	Citizen	2 – 3	Biu Chun Rangers	Mong Kok, Kowloon
20:00 (GMT+8)	Campion 41' (pen.); Sham Kwok Fai (yellow card) 42'; Detinho 69'; Festus (yellow card) 89'	Report	73' Lam Hok Hei; (yellow card) 74' (goal) 85' Yeung Chi Lun; 90' (yellow card) 90' Saric	Stadium: Mong Kok Stadium (Capatity:6,680); Attendance: 488; Referee: Ng Chiu Kok; Assistant referees: Lam Chi Ho, Chung Ming Sang; Fourth official: Yu Chun San

23 October 2012 Week 6	Citizen	3 – 0	Yokohama FC Hong Kong	Mong Kok, Kowloon
14:30 (GMT+8)	Festus (yellow card) 33' (goal) 65'; Detinho 52'; Tam Lok Hin (yellow card) 74' (goal) 90'	Report	(yellow card) 12' Leung Kwok Wai	Stadium: Mong Kok Stadium (Capatity:6,680); Attendance: 1,231; Referee: Cheng Oi Cho; Assistant referees: Chan Shui Hung, Lam Nai Kei; Fourth official: Lam Chi Ho

3 November 2012 Week 7	Southern	3 – 1	Citizen	Aberdeen, Hong Kong Island
14:30 (GMT+8)	Dieguito 22' (yellow card) 61'; Landon Ling 44' (yellow card) 50'; Carril (yellow card) 55' (goal) 69'; Chan Cheuk Kwong (yellow card) 83'	Report	2' Hélio; (yellow card) 77' Chiu Chun Kit; (yellow card) 89' Henry	Stadium: Aberdeen Sports Ground (Capatity:4,000^{1}); Attendance: 385; Referee: Ng Chiu Kok; Assistant referees: Chan Shui Hung, Poon Ming Fai; Fourth official: Sarao, Amarjit Singh

11 November 2012 Week 8	Citizen	7 – 3	Wofoo Tai Po	Mong Kok, Kowloon
17:30 (GMT+8)	Festus 20' (yellow card) 60'; Tam Lok Hin (yellow card) 28'; Nakamura 36', 90'; Detinho 48', 71', 72'; Sham Kwok Keung 75'; Hélio (yellow card) 76'	Report	40' Annan; 42', 45+1' Alex	Stadium: Mong Kok Stadium (Capatity:6,680); Attendance: 757; Referee: Cheng Oi Cho; Assistant referees: Chow Chun Kit, Chung Ming Sang; Fourth official: Ho Wai Sing

20 December 2012 Week 9	Sunray Cave JC Sun Hei	1 – 1	Citizen	Mong Kok, Kowloon
20:00 (GMT+8)	Cheung Kwok Ming (yellow card) 66'; Barry 84'	Report	(yellow card) 58' (goal) 71' Hélio; (yellow card) 90+3' Festus	Stadium: Mong Kok Stadium (Capatity:6,680); Attendance: 318; Referee: Liu Kwok Man; Assistant referees: Chow Chun Kit, Lau Fong Hei; Fourth official: Luk Kin Sun

20 January 2013 Week 10	Biu Chun Rangers	3 – 3	Citizen	Sham Shui Po, Kowloon
14:30 (GMT+8)	Leung Hing Kit (red card) 33'; Bamnjo (yellow card) 53'; Giovane 57', 90+5'; Lau Nim Yat (yellow card) 78'; Cheng King Ho 86'	Report	35' Featus; (yellow card) 37' Sandro; (yellow card) 63' Chan Hin Kwong; (yellow card) 67' (goal) 79', 81' Sham Kwok Keung	Stadium: Sham Shui Po Sports Ground (Capatity:2,194); Attendance: 453; Referee: Liu Kwok Man; Assistant referees: Chan Shui Hung, Poon Ming Fai; Fourth official: Ho Wai Sing

3 February 2013 Week 11	Citizen	1 – 2	Sunray Cave JC Sun Hei	Mong Kok, Kowloon
17:30 (GMT+8)	Wong Yiu Fu (yellow card) 16'; Zhang Chunhui 37' (o.g.); Gustavo (yellow card) 51'; Sandro (yellow card) 79'	Report	24' Diaz; 43' Roberto; (yellow card) 90+4' Chow Kwok Wai	Stadium: Mong Kok Stadium (Capatity:6,680); Attendance: 408; Referee: Ng Kai Lam; Assistant referees: Lam Chi Ho, Yau Tsz Yeung; Fourth official: Ho Wai Sing

23 February 2013 Week 12	Wofoo Tai Po	3 – 1	Citizen	Tai Po, New Territories
14:30 (GMT+8)	Annan 17'; Clayton (yellow card) 43'; Ye Jia 49'	Report	13' Sandro; (yellow card) 55' Gustavo; (yellow card) 61' Chiu Chun Kit	Stadium: Tai Po Sports Ground (Capatity:3,000); Attendance: 527; Referee: Cheng Oi Cho; Assistant referees: Chow Chun Kit, Lam Nai Kei; Fourth official: Lam Shing Yan Franky

3 March 2013 Week 13	Citizen	0 – 1	South China	Mong Kok, Kowloon
17:30 (GMT+8)	Hélio (yellow card) 90+3'	Report	36' Itaparica	Stadium: Mong Kok Stadium (Capatity:6,680); Attendance: 1,956; Referee: Tong Kui Sum; Assistant referees: Chow Chun Kit, Chung Ming Sang; Fourth official: Cheng Oi Cho

16 March 2013 Week 14	Citizen	0 – 1	Southern	Mong Kok, Kowloon
17:30 (GMT+8)	Gustavo (yellow card) 16'; Chiu Chun Kit (yellow card) 22'; Sandro (yellow card) 24'; Chan Hin Kwong (yellow card) 41'; Tse Tak Him (yellow card) 66'; Nakamura (yellow card) 73'; Campion (yellow card) 83'	Report	23' (pen.) (yellow card) 71' Carril; (yellow card) 30' Chung Hon Chee; (yellow card) 44' Tse Man Wing	Stadium: Mong Kok Stadium (Capatity:6,680); Attendance: 639; Referee: Ng Chiu Kok; Assistant referees: Lam Chi Ho, Tang Hing Fu; Fourth official: Yu Chun San

29 March 2013 Week 15	Tuen Mun	0 – 5	Citizen	Tuen Mun, New Territories
14:30 (GMT+8)	Mauricio (yellow card) 24'; Xie Silida (yellow card) 44'; Kwok Wing Sun (yellow card) 62'	Report	(yellow card) 16' Gustavo; 25' (pen.) Festus; (yellow card) 40' Chan Hin Kwong; 48', 63', 69' (yellow card) 61' Nakamura; 75' Sham Kwok Fai	Stadium: Tuen Mun Tang Siu Kin Sports Ground (Capatity:2,200); Attendance: 775; Referee: Cheng Oi Cho; Assistant referees: Yu Chun San, Yu Kin Fung; Fourth official: Ho Wai Sing

12 April 2013 Week 16	Sun Pegasus	0 – 0	Citizen	Yuen Long, New Territories
20:00 (GMT+8)	Ho Kwok Chuen (yellow card) 37'; Lo Chun Kit (yellow card) 74'; Bai He (yellow card) 84'	Report	(yellow card) 9' Chan Hin Kwong; (yellow card) 39' Nakamura; (yellow card) 58' So Loi Keung; (yellow card) 82' Sham Kwok Fai; (yellow card) 87' Hélio	Stadium: Yuen Long Stadium (Capatity:4,932); Attendance: 397; Referee: Ng Kai Lam; Assistant referees: Chung Ming Sang, Yu Chun San; Fourth official: Chan Shui Hung

18 April 2013 Week 17	Yokohama FC Hong Kong	1 – 1	Citizen	Siu Sai Wan, Hong Kong Island
20:00 (GMT+8)	Fukuda 33'; Mirko (yellow card) 72'; Mijanović (yellow card) 80'	Report	80' Sham Kwok Keung	Stadium: Siu Sai Wan Sports Ground (Capatity:12,000); Attendance: 227; Referee: Liu Kwok Man; Assistant referees: Lam Chi Ho, Poon Ming Fai; Fourth official: Tang Hing Fu

4 May 2013 Week 18	Citizen	1 – 0	Kitchee	Mong Kok, Kowloon
15:30 (GMT+8)	Festus 81'	Report	(yellow card) 8' Lo Chi Kwan; (yellow card) 59' Liu Quankun; (yellow card) 73' Tsang Chi Hau	Stadium: Mong Kok Stadium (Capatity:6,680); Attendance: 1,820; Referee: Tong Kui Sum; Assistant referees: Lam Nai Kei, Yau Ho Fai Leo; Fourth official: Chan Shui Hung

==== Senior Challenge Shield ====
===== First round =====
22 September 2012 1st leg	Biu Chun Rangers	1 – 5	Citizen	Sham Shui Po, Kowloon
14:30 (GMT+8)	Komar 17'; Saric (yellow card) 27'	Report	26', 87' Nakamura; 28' Yuan Yang; 70' Sham Kwok Keung; 90' So Loi Keung	Stadium: Sham Shui Po Sports Ground (Capacity: 2,194); Attendance: 598; Referee: Ng Kai Lam; Assistant referees: Chan Shui Hung, Lam Shing Yan, Franky; Fourth official: Lam Nai Kei

10 October 2012 2nd leg	Citizen	4 – 0 (9 – 1 agg.)	Biu Chun Rangers	Mong Kok, Kowloon
20:00 (GMT+8)	Yuan Yang 39'; Tam Lok Hin 64'; Sham Kwok Keung (yellow card) 68'; Detinho 79'; Si Chi Ho 85'; Campion (yellow card) 86'	Report		Stadium: Mong Kok Stadium (Capacity: 6,680); Attendance: 290; Referee: Ho Wai Sing; Assistant referees: Chow Chun Kit, Chung Ming Sang; Fourth official: Lam Chi Ho

===== Quarter-finals =====
17 November 2012 1st leg	Citizen	1 – 0	Sunray Cave JC Sun Hei	Tsing Yi, New Territories
14:30(GMT+8)	Shum Kwok Fai 57'; Sham Kwok Keung (yellow card) 77'; Festus 84'	Report	(yellow card) 76' Choi Kwok Wai; (yellow card) 84' Cheung Kin Fung; (yellow card) 86' Roberto	Stadium: Tsing Yi Sports Ground (Capacity: 1,500); Attendance: 264; Referee: Ng Chiu Kok; Assistant referees: Ho Wai Sing, Yau Ho Fai; Fourth official: Yu Chun San

22 November 2012 2nd leg	Sunray Cave JC Sun Hei	1 – 1 (1 – 2 agg.)	Citizen	Mong Kok, Kowloon
20:00(GMT+8)	Kilama (yellow card) 68'; Cheung Kin Fung 86'; Leung Ka Hai (yellow card) 90'	Report	89' Paulinho	Stadium: Mong Kok Stadium (Capacity: 6,680); Attendance: 463; Referee: Tong Kui Sum; Assistant referees: Lam Chi Ho, Chung Ming Sang; Fourth official: Lam Nai Kei

===== Semi-finals =====
16 December 2012 1st leg	South China	2 – 3	Citizen	So Kon Po, Hong Kong Island
15:00(GMT+8)	Joel (yellow card) 20'; Mauro 21'; Man Pei Tak (yellow card) 61' (red card) 67'; Lee Wai Lim 90+3'; Sealy (red card) 90+4'	Report	(yellow card) 1' (goal) 75' Festus; (yellow card) 32' Tam Lok Hin; (yellow card) 44' Sham Kwok Keung; 64' (pen.) Campion; 70' Paulinho; (yellow card) 90' Henry	Stadium: Hong Kong Stadium (Capacity: 40,000); Attendance: 1,782; Referee: Ng Chiu Kok; Assistant referees: Chow Chun Kit, Lam Chi Ho; Fourth official: Lam Shing Yan, Franky

5 January 2013 2nd leg	Citizen	0 – 0 (3 – 2 agg.)	South China	Mong Kok, Kowloon
14:30(GMT+8)	Yuan Yeng (yellow card) 38'; So Loi Keung (yellow card) 45+2'; Sham Kwok Fai (yellow card) 58'; Chan Hin Kwong (yellow card) 66'; Paulinho (yellow card) 90+6'	Report	(yellow card) 49' Mauro; (yellow card) 72' Tse; (yellow card) 75' Itaparica; (yellow card) 76' Dhiego; (yellow card) 78' Kwok Kin Pong; (yellow card) 86' Ticão	Stadium: Mong Kok Stadium (Capacity: 6,680); Attendance: 3,220; Referee: Liu Kwok Man; Assistant referees: Chow Chun Kit, Ho Wai Sing; Fourth official: Lam Chi Ho

===== Final =====
27 January 2013	Wofoo Tai Po	2 – 2 (a.e.t.) (5 – 3 p)	Citizen	So Kon Po, Hong Kong Island
16:00(GMT+8)	Chan Sze Wing (yellow card) 14'; Jing Teng (yellow card) 41'; Annan (yellow card) 49'; Clayton (yellow card) 53' (goal) 61'; Aender 74'; Lui Chi Hing (yellow card) 105+1'	Report	43' (yellow card) 63' So Loi Keung; 47' Detinho; (yellow card) 79' Hélio; (yellow card) 93' Campion	Stadium: Hong Kong Stadium (Capacity: 40,000); Attendance: 3,294; Referee: Ng Chiu Kok; Assistant referees: Chow Chun Kit, Lam Chi Ho; Fourth official: Ng Kai Lam; Man of the Match: Aender (Wofoo Tai Po)
	Penalties
	Aender (penalty scored); Alex (penalty scored); Lui Chi Hing (penalty scored); Annan (penalty scored); Caleb (penalty scored)		Campion (penalty missed); Festus (penalty scored); Detinho (penalty scored); Sham Kwok Fai (penalty scored)

==== FA Cup ====
===== First round =====
26 December 2012 1st leg	Citizen	0 – 2	South China	Mong Kok, Kowloon
14:30 (GMT+8)	Chiu Chun Kit (yellow card) 12' (yellow-red card) 77'; Paulinho (yellow card) 45+2'; Hélio (yellow card) 66'; Campion (yellow card) 67'; Wong Yiu Fu (yellow card) 87'	Report	(yellow card) 6' Joel; (yellow card) 45+2' Yapp Hung Fai; (yellow card) 51' (goal) 56' Dhiego; 81' Au Yeung Yiu Chung	Stadium: Mong Kok Stadium (Capacity: 6,680); Attendance: 2,292; Referee: Ng Kai Lam; Assistant referees: Ho Wai Sing, Chung Ming Sang; Fourth official: Chan Ming Siu

13 January 2013 2nd leg	South China	5 – 1 (7 – 1 agg.)	Citizen	So Kon Po, Hong Kong Island
14:30 (GMT+8)	Au Yeung Yiu Chung 17', 45'; Celin 48'; Luk Chi Ho 77'; Kwok Kin Pong (yellow card) 83'; Mauro 90+1'	Report	(yellow card) 47' Henry; 72' (pen.) Sandro	Stadium: Hong Kong Stadium (Capacity: 40,000); Attendance: 1,902; Referee: Tong Kui Sum; Assistant referees: Lam Chi Ho, Poon Ming Fai; Fourth official: Cheng Oi Cho

Remarks:
^{1} The capacity of Aberdeen Sports Ground is originally 9,000, but only the 4,000-seated main stand is opened for football match.
