= 2012–13 Hong Kong Senior Shield =

Tournament details
- Country: Hong Kong
- Teams: 10

Final positions
- Champions: Wofoo Tai Po (1st title)
- Runners-up: Citizen

Tournament statistics
- Matches played: 17
- Goals scored: 43 (2.53 per match)
- Attendance: 19,136 (1,126 per match)
- Top goal scorer(s): Alex Tayo Akande (Wofoo Tai Po) (5 goals)

Awards
- Best player: Aender Naves Mesquita (Wofoo Tai Po)

2012–13 Hong Kong Senior Shield was the 111th season of one of the Asian oldest football knockout competitions, Hong Kong Senior Shield. The competition was played in a two-legged tie, except for the final, which was played in one match at Hong Kong Stadium. The winner guaranteed a place in the 2013 Hong Kong AFC Cup play-offs.

Wofoo Tai Po won their first Senior Shield title as they defeated Citizen in the final in a penalty shoot-out.

== Calendar ==
Stage	Round	Date of first leg	Date of second leg
Knockout	First round	22 – 23 September 2012	10 – 11 October 2012
Knockout	Quarter-finals	28 October – 18 November 2012	22 – 25 November 2012
Knockout	Semi-finals	15 – 16 December 2012	5 – 6 January 2013
Knockout	Final	27 January 2013 at Hong Kong Stadium	

== Bracket ==
The following bracket doesn't show first round matches.

Quarterfinals
1	Sun Pegasus	1	0	1
8	Southern	0	2	2
4	Tuen Mun	3	0	3
5	Wofoo Tai Po	2	5	7
2	South China	1	0	1
7	Kitchee	0	0	0
3	Sunray Cave JC Sun Hei	0	1	1
6	Citizen	1	1	2

Semifinals
Southern	1	1	2
Wofoo Tai Po	0	3	3
South China	2	0	2
Citizen	3	0	3

Finals
Wofoo Tai Po (p)	2 (5)
Citizen	2 (3)

== Fixtures and results ==
=== First round ===
22 September 2012 First leg	Biu Chun Rangers	1–5	Citizen	Sham Shui Po, Kowloon
14:30 (GMT+8)	Komar 17'; Saric (yellow card) 27'	Report	26', 87' Nakamura; 28' Yuan Yang; 70' Sham Kwok Keung; 90' So Loi Keung	Stadium: Sham Shui Po Sports Ground (Capacity: 2,194); Attendance: 598; Referee: Ng Kai Lam; Assistant referees: Chan Shui Hung, Lam Shing Yan, Franky; Fourth official: Lam Nai Kei

10 October 2012 Second leg	Citizen	4–0 (9–1 agg.)	Biu Chun Rangers	Mong Kok, Kowloon
20:00 (GMT+8)	Yuan Yang 39'; Tam Lok Hin 64'; Sham Kwok Keung (yellow card) 68'; Detinho 79'; Si 85'; Campion (yellow card) 86'	Report		Stadium: Mong Kok Stadium (Capacity: 6,680); Attendance: 290; Referee: Ho Wai Sing; Assistant referees: Chow Chun Kit, Chung Ming Sang; Fourth official: Lam Chi Ho

23 September 2012 First leg	Wofoo Tai Po	2–0	Yokohama FC Hong Kong	Tai Po, New Territories
14:00 (GMT+8)	Lui Chi Hing (yellow card) 9'; Alex 15' (yellow card) 65'; Clayton 42'	Report	(yellow card) 52' Li Jian	Stadium: Tai Po Sports Ground (Capacity: 3,000); Attendance: 706; Referee: Tong Kui Sum; Assistant referees: Ho Wai Sing, Poon Ming Fai; Fourth official: Chow Chun Kit

11 October 2012 Second leg	Yokohama FC Hong Kong	0–0 (0–2 agg.)	Wofoo Tai Po	Siu Sai Wan, Hong Kong Island
20:00 (GMT+8)	Fong Pak Lun (yellow card) 90'; Yoshitake (yellow card) 90'	Report	(yellow card) 90' Wong Yim Kwan	Stadium: Siu Sai Wan Sports Ground (Capacity: 12,000); Attendance: 592; Referee: Tong Kui Sum; Assistant referees: Lam Nai Kei, Poon Ming Fai; Fourth official: Ng Chiu Kok

=== Quarter-finals ===
28 October 2012 First leg	Southern	0–1	Sun Pegasus	Aberdeen, Hong Kong Island
14:30(GMT+8)	Dieguito (yellow card) 29'	Report	(yellow card) 43' Lee Wai Lun; (yellow card) 75' Ng Wai Chiu; 90+3' Thiago	Stadium: Aberdeen Sports Ground (Capacity: 4,000^{1}); Attendance: 349; Referee: Ng Kai Lam; Assistant referees: Chan Shui Hung, Yu Chun San; Fourth official: Sarao, Amarjit Singh

24 November 2012 Second leg	Sun Pegasus	0–2 (1–2 agg.)	Southern	Yuen Long, New Territories
17:30(GMT+8)	McKee (yellow card) 37'; Mbome (yellow card) 51'; Thiago (yellow card) 78'; Xu Deshuai (yellow card) 83'	Report	27' Chow Ka Wa; (yellow card) 32' Lander; 75' Carril; (yellow card) 90+1' Landon Ling; (yellow card) 90+3' Ip Chung Long	Stadium: Yuen Long Stadium (Capacity: 4,932); Attendance: 406; Referee: Ng Chiu Kok; Assistant referees: Ho Wai Sing, Yu Chun San; Fourth official: Luk Kin Sun

18 November 2012 First leg	Tuen Mun	3–2	Wofoo Tai Po	Tuen Mun, New Territories
14:30(GMT+8)	Mauricio 5', 48'; Law Ka Lok (yellow card) 45'; Beto 84' (pen.)	Report	65' (yellow card) 72' Annan; 90' Clayton	Stadium: Tuen Mun Tang Shiu Kin Sports Ground (Capacity: 2,200); Attendance: 661; Referee: Tong Kui Sum; Assistant referees: Chow Chun Kit, Lam Shing Yan; Fourth official: Chan Ming Siu

24 November 2012 Second leg	Wofoo Tai Po	5–0 (7–2 agg.)	Tuen Mun	Tsing Yi, New Territories
14:30(GMT+8)	Alex 71', 82', 90'; To Hon To 79'; Ye Jia 89'	Report	(yellow card) 40' (yellow-red card) 53' Mauricio; (yellow card) 55' Beto; (yellow card) 72' Wong Chi Chung; (yellow card) 81' Diego; (yellow card) 84' Law Ka Lok; (yellow card) 90+2' Li Haiqiang	Stadium: Tsing Yi Sports Ground (Capacity: 1,500); Attendance: 483; Referee: Cheng Oi Cho; Assistant referees: Chow Chun Kit, Poon Ming Fai; Fourth official: Sarao Amarjit Singh

17 November 2012 First leg	South China	1–0	Kitchee	So Kon Po, Hong Kong Island
17:30(GMT+8)	Man Pei Tak (yellow card) 6'; Lee Chi Ho (yellow card) 54'; Itaparica 87'	Report	(yellow card) 12' Spitz; (yellow card) 26' Chan Man Fai; (yellow card) 32' (yellow-red card) 90+3' Liu Quankun; (yellow card) 68' Jordi Tarrés; (yellow card) 78' Recio; (yellow card) 81' Cheng Siu Wai	Stadium: Hong Kong Stadium (Capacity: 40,000); Attendance: 2,757; Referee: Cheng Oi Cho; Assistant referees: Chung Ming Sang, Poon Ming Fai; Fourth official: Tong Kui Sum

25 November 2012 Second leg	Kitchee	0–0 (0–1 agg.)	South China	Tseung Kwan O, New Territories
17:30(GMT+8)	Lo Kwan Yee (yellow card) 17'; Cheng Siu Wai (yellow card) 63'	Report	(yellow card) 25' Mauro; (yellow card) 41' Kwok Kin Pong; (yellow card) 85' Itaparica; (yellow card) 90+4' Yapp Hung Fai	Stadium: Tseung Kwan O Sports Ground (Capacity: 3,500); Attendance: 1,782; Referee: Liu Kwok Man; Assistant referees: Chan Shui Hung, Lam Nai Kei; Fourth official: Ho Wai Sing

17 November 2012 First leg	Citizen	1–0	Sunray Cave JC Sun Hei	Tsing Yi, New Territories
14:30(GMT+8)	Shum Kwok Fai 57'; Sham Kwok Keung (yellow card) 77'; Festus 84'	Report	(yellow card) 76' Choi Kwok Wai; (yellow card) 84' Cheung Kin Fung; (yellow card) 86' Roberto	Stadium: Tsing Yi Sports Ground (Capacity: 1,500); Attendance: 264; Referee: Ng Chiu Kok; Assistant referees: Ho Wai Sing, Yau Ho Fai; Fourth official: Yu Chun San

22 November 2012 Second leg	Sunray Cave JC Sun Hei	1–1 (1–2 agg.)	Citizen	Mong Kok, Kowloon
20:00(GMT+8)	Kilama (yellow card) 68'; Cheung Kin Fung 86'; Leung Ka Hai (yellow card) 90'	Report	89' Paulinho	Stadium: Mong Kok Stadium (Capacity: 6,680); Attendance: 463; Referee: Tong Kui Sum; Assistant referees: Lam Chi Ho, Chung Ming Sang; Fourth official: Lam Nai Kei

=== Semi-finals ===
15 December 2012 First leg	South China	2–3	Citizen	So Kon Po, Hong Kong Island
15:00(GMT+8)	Joel (yellow card) 20'; Mauro 21'; Man Pei Tak (yellow card) 61' (red card) 67'; Lee Wai Lim 90+3'; Sealy (red card) 90+4'	Report	(yellow card) 1' (goal) 75' Festus; (yellow card) 32' Tam Lok Hin; (yellow card) 44' Sham Kwok Keung; 64' (pen.) Campion; 70' Paulinho; (yellow card) 90' Henry	Stadium: Hong Kong Stadium (Capacity: 40,000); Attendance: 1,782; Referee: Ng Chiu Kok; Assistant referees: Chow Chun Kit, Lam Chi Ho; Fourth official: Lam Shing Yan, Franky

5 January 2013 Second leg	Citizen	0–0 (3–2 agg.)	South China	Mong Kok, Kowloon
14:30(GMT+8)	Yuan Yeng (yellow card) 38'; So Loi Keung (yellow card) 45+2'; Sham Kwok Fai (yellow card) 58'; Chan Hin Kwong (yellow card) 66'; Paulinho (yellow card) 90+6'	Report	(yellow card) 49' Mauro; (yellow card) 72' Tse; (yellow card) 75' Itaparica; (yellow card) 76' Dhiego; (yellow card) 78' Kwok Kin Pong; (yellow card) 86' Ticão	Stadium: Mong Kok Stadium (Capacity: 6,680); Attendance: 3,220; Referee: Liu Kwok Man; Assistant referees: Chow Chun Kit, Ho Wai Sing; Fourth official: Lam Chi Ho

16 December 2012 First leg	Southern	1–0	Wofoo Tai Po	Tsing Yi, New Territories
14:30(GMT+8)	Fofo (yellow card) 24'; Lander (yellow card) 58'; Rubén López 69'; Dieguito (yellow card) 90+4'	Report	(yellow card) 74' To Hon To; (yellow card) 88' Clayton	Stadium: Tsing Yi Sports Ground (Capacity: 1,500^{1}); Attendance: 533; Referee: Ho Wai Sing; Assistant referees: Tong Kui Sum, Poon Ming Fai; Fourth official: Yu Chun San

6 January 2013 Second leg	Wofoo Tai Po	3–1 (3–2 agg.)	Southern	Tai Po, New Territories
14:30(GMT+8)	Aender 2' (yellow card) 83'; Alex 15' (pen.); To Hon To 53' (yellow card) 57'; Lui Chi Hing (yellow card) 90+3'; Li Hon Ho (yellow card) 90+4'	Report	(yellow card) 13' Fofo; (yellow card) 14' Chiu Yu Ming; (yellow card) 33' Rubén López; (yellow card) 36' Carril; (yellow card) 55' Landon Ling; 75' Chan Cheuk Kwong	Stadium: Tai Po Sports Ground (Capacity: 3,000); Attendance: 956; Referee: Cheng Oi Cho; Assistant referees: Chan Shui Hung, Yu Chun San; Fourth official: Lam Shing Yan Franky

=== Final ===
27 January 2013 Final	Wofoo Tai Po	2–2 (a.e.t.) (5–3 p)	Citizen	So Kon Po, Hong Kong Island
16:00(GMT+8)	Clayton 61'; Aender 74'	Report	43' So Loi Keung; 47' Detinho	Stadium: Hong Kong Stadium (Capacity:40,000); Attendance: 3,294; Referee: Ng Chiu Kok; Man of the Match: Aender (Wofoo Tai Po)
	Penalties
	Aender (penalty scored); Alex (penalty scored); Lui Chi Hing (penalty scored); Annan (penalty scored); Caleb (penalty scored)		(penalty missed) Campion; (penalty scored) Festus; (penalty scored) Detinho; (penalty scored) Sham Kwok Fai

Wofoo Tai Po	Citizen

WOFOO TAI PO:
GK	1	(Hong Kong) Li Hon Ho^{LP}
RB	19	(Hong Kong) Li Shu Yeung^{LP}
CB	10	(Hong Kong) Lui Chi Hing (c) ^{LP}	(yellow card) 105+1'
CB	5	(Brazil) Clayton Afonso^{FP}	(yellow card) 53'
LB	3	(Hong Kong) Chan Sze Wing^{LP}	(yellow card) 14'	(substituted off) 113'
DM	7	(Brazil) Aender Naves^{FP}
CM	13	(Hong Kong) To Hon To^{LP}
CM	26	(China) Jing Teng^{LP}	(yellow card) 41'	(substituted off) 60'
RW	23	(Hong Kong) Ye Jia^{LP}		(substituted off) 91'
LW	15	(Ghana) Christian Annan^{LP}	(yellow card) 49'
CF	8	(Nigeria) Alex Tayo Akande^{FP}
Substitutes:
GK	33	(Hong Kong) Pang Tsz Kin^{LP}
DF	6	(Hong Kong) Chen Jingde^{LP}
DF	21	(Hong Kong) Chan Yuk Chi^{LP}
MF	18	(Hong Kong) Wong Yim Kwan^{LP}
MF	25	(China) Che Runqiu^{LP}		(substituted on) 91'
FW	9	(Hong Kong) Chen Liming^{LP}		(substituted on) 60'
FW	17	(Nigeria) Caleb Ekwegwo^{FP}		(substituted on) 113'
Coach:
(Hong Kong) Cheung Po Chun

CITIZEN:
GK	29	(Hong Kong) Tse Tak Him^{LP}
RB	4	(Hong Kong) Sham Kwok Fai^{LP}
CB	23	(Brazil) Hélio^{FP}	(yellow card) 79'
CB	7	(Nigeria) Festus Baise (c) ^{LP}
LB	27	(Hong Kong) Chan Hin Kwong^{LP}		(substituted off) 100'
DM	5	(Brazil) Gustavo^{FP}		(substituted off) 71'
DM	11	(Hong Kong) Michael Campion^{LP}	(yellow card) 93'
RM	8	(Hong Kong) So Loi Keung^{LP}	(yellow card) 63'
LM	19	(Brazil) Paulinho Piracicaba^{FP}		(substituted off) 46'
SS	16	(Hong Kong) Tam Lok Hin^{LP}
CF	18	(Hong Kong) Sham Kwok Keung^{LP}
Substitutes:
GK	17	(Hong Kong) Liu Fu Yuen^{LP}
DF	2	(Hong Kong) Wong Yiu Fu^{LP}		(substituted on) 100'
DF	12	(Hong Kong) Ma Ka Ki^{LP}
DF	28	(Hong Kong) Chiu Chun Kit^{LP}
FW	10	(Japan) Yuto Nakamura^{FP}
FW	21	(China) Yuan Yang^{LP}		(substituted on) 71'
FW	30	(Brazil) Detinho^{FP}		(substituted on) 46'
Coach:
(Hong Kong) Chu Kwok Kuen

MATCH OFFICIALS

- Assistant referees:
  - Chow Chun Kit
  - Lam Chi Ho
- Fourth official: Ng Kai Lam
- ^{LP} Local Player
- ^{FP} Foreign Player

MATCH RULES

- 90 minutes. (1st Half Added Time: 1 min, 2nd Half Added Time: 5 mins)
- 30 minutes of extra-time if necessary.
- Penalty shoot-out if scores still level.
- Seven named substitutes
- Maximum of 3 substitutions.

Remarks:
^{1} The capacity of Aberdeen Sports Ground is originally 9,000, but only the 4,000-seated main stand is opened for football match.

== Scorers ==
The scorers in the 2012–13 Hong Kong Senior Shield are as follows:

5 goals

- (Nigeria) Alex Tayo Akande (Wofoo Tai Po)

3 goals

- (Brazil) Clayton Michel Afonso (Wofoo Tai Po)

2 goals

- (Brazil) Detinho (Citizen)
- (Ghana) Festus Baise (Citizen)
- (Brazil) Paulinho Piracicaba (Citizen)
- (Hong Kong) So Loi Keung (Citizen)
- (China) Yuan Yang (Citizen)
- (Japan) Yuto Nakamura (Citizen)
- (Brazil) Aender Naves Mesquita (Wofoo Tai Po)
- (Hong Kong) To Hon To (Wofoo Tai Po)
- (Brazil) Mauricio Correa Da Luz (Tuen Mun)

1 goal

- (Croatia) Hrvoje Komar (Biu Chun Rangers)
- (Hong Kong) Michael Campion (Citizen)
- (Hong Kong) Sham Kwok Keung (Citizen)
- (Hong Kong) Boris Si (Citizen)
- (Hong Kong) Tam Lok Hin (Citizen)
- (Brazil) Itaparica (South China)
- (Hong Kong) Lee Wai Lim (South China)
- (Brazil) Mauro Rafael da Silva (South China)
- (Hong Kong) Chan Cheuk Kwong (Southern)
- (Hong Kong) Chow Ka Wa (Southern)
- (Spain) Jonathan Carril (Southern)
- (Spain) Rubén López García-Madrid (Southern)
- (Brazil) Thiago Constância (Sun Pegasus)
- (Ghana) Christian Annan (Sun Pegasus)
- (Hong Kong) Cheung Kin Fung (Sunray Cave JC Sun Hei)
- (Hong Kong) Ye Jia (Wofoo Tai Po)
- (Brazil) Beto (Tuen Mun)

== Prizes ==
Top Scorer Award	Player of the Tournament
(Nigeria) Alex Tayo Akande	(Brazil) Aender Navas Mesquita
