= Chan Sze Chun =

Hong Kong footballer (born 1990)

Personal information
- Full name: Chan Sze Chun
- Date of birth: 22 April 1990 (age 36)
- Place of birth: Hong Kong
- Height: 1.77 m (5 ft 10 in)
- Position: Right back

Team information
- Current team: Tai Po (assistant coach)

Youth career
- 2002–2006: Eastern District
- 2006–2007: Happy Valley
- 2007–2010: South China

Senior career*
Years	Team	Apps	(Gls)
2010–2013	Citizen	1	(0)
2013–2014	HKFC	20	(0)
2014–2016	Eastern District	10	(0)
2016–2017	HKFC	5	(0)

Managerial career
- 2023–2026: Tai Po (assistant coach)
- * Club domestic league appearances and goals as of 22 April 2017

Chan Sze Chun (Chinese: 陳思駿; born 22 April 1990) is a Hong Kong former professional footballer who played as a right back.

== Club career ==
In 2010, Chan trained with the youth academy of English Premier League side Birmingham after winning the Hong Kong reality television show A Kick to Success.

Chan started his career with Citizen in the Hong Kong top flight, where he made 1 league appearance and scored 0 goals. On 20 January 2013, he debuted for Citizen during a 3–3 draw with Rangers.

In 2013, Chan signed for Hong Kong second tier club HKFC. In 2016, he returned to HKFC in the Hong Kong top flight.
