= Lander Panera =

Spanish footballer

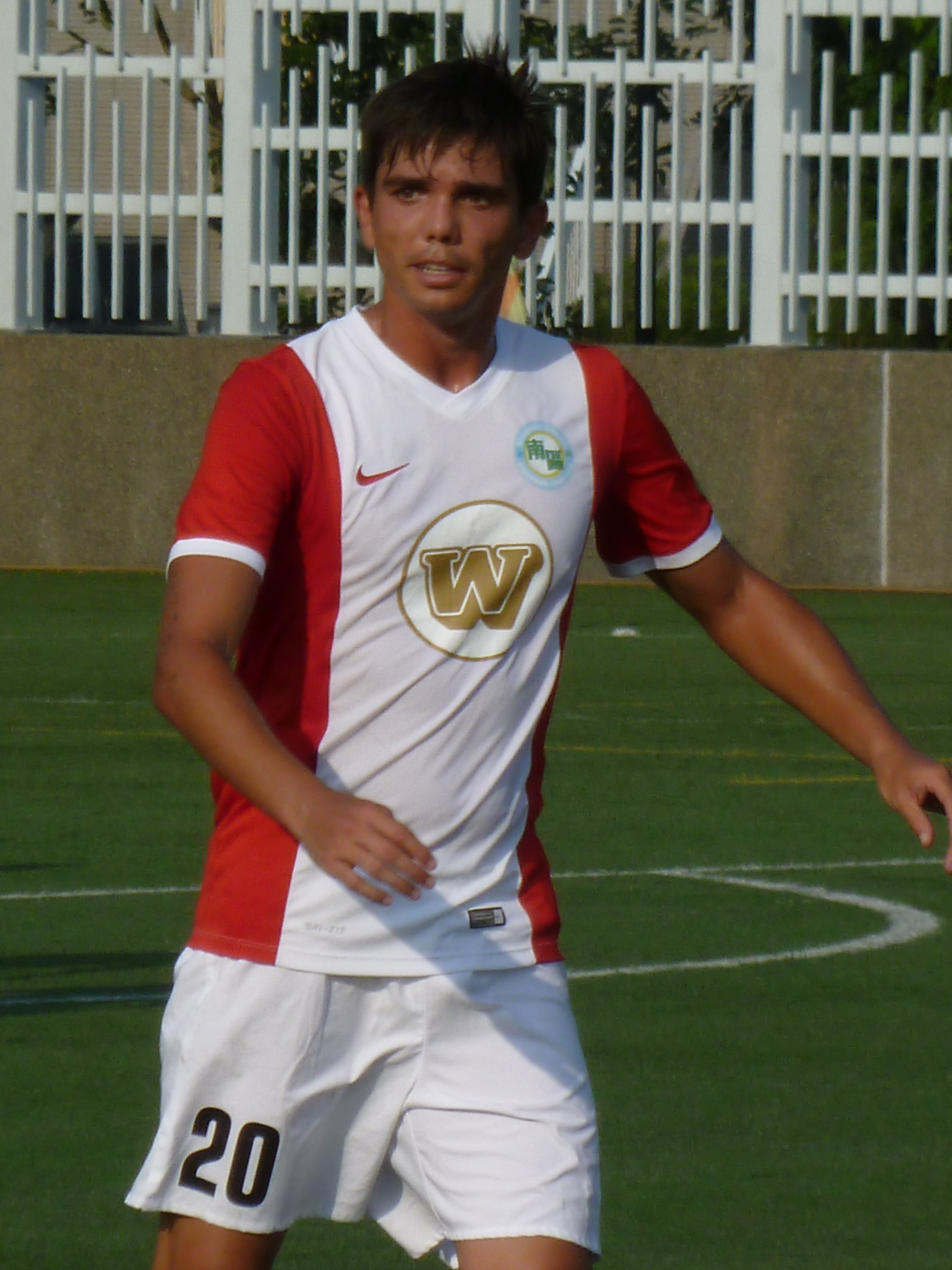

Personal information
- Full name: Lander Panera Arteagabeitia
- Date of birth: 4 December 1981 (age 44)
- Place of birth: Alicante, Spain
- Height: 1.79 m (5 ft 10 in)
- Position: Defensive midfielder

Team information
- Current team: Yau Tsim Mong

Senior career*
Years	Team	Apps	(Gls)
2003–2004	El Altet		
2004–2005	San Juan de Alicante		
2005–2008	El Campello		
2008–2011	Universidad de Alicante		
2011–2012	Alicante	30	(0)
2012–2015	Southern	10	(0)
2015–2018	Yau Tsim Mong	14	(3)
- * Club domestic league appearances and goals

Lander Panera Arteagabeitia (Chinese: 蘭特; born 4 December 1981) is a Spanish former professional footballer who played as a defensive midfielder.

== Club career ==
=== Career in Spain ===
Arteagabeitia started his professional career at the fifth-tier Divisiones Regionales de Fútbol in Spain. He played for four clubs at the fifth-tier division league for eight seasons before joining fourth-tier, Tercera División club Alicante CF in 2011.

=== Southern ===
Arteagabeitia joined newly promoted Hong Kong First Division League club Southern District RSA in mid-2012, along with other three Spanish players. He made his debut for the club on 1 September 2012 against Biu Chun Rangers. He suffered a tibial plateau fracture on 19 January 2013 against Sun Pegasus, for which he hand surgery later that day. Arteagabeitia was expected to stay on the sidelines for three months and would miss the rest of the season.

== Club statistics (Hong Kong) ==
As of 5 May 2013.

Club	Season	Division	League		Senior Shield		League Cup		FA Cup		AFC Cup		Total	
Club	Season	Division	Apps	Goals	Apps	Goals	Apps	Goals	Apps	Goals	Apps	Goals	Apps	Goals
Southern	2012–13	First Division	10	0	4	0	—	—	2	0	N/A	N/A	16	0
Southern Total			10	0	4	0	0	0	2	0	0	0	16	0
Hong Kong Total			10	0	4	0	0	0	2	0	0	0	16	0
