= Rubén López (footballer, born 1979) =

Spanish footballer

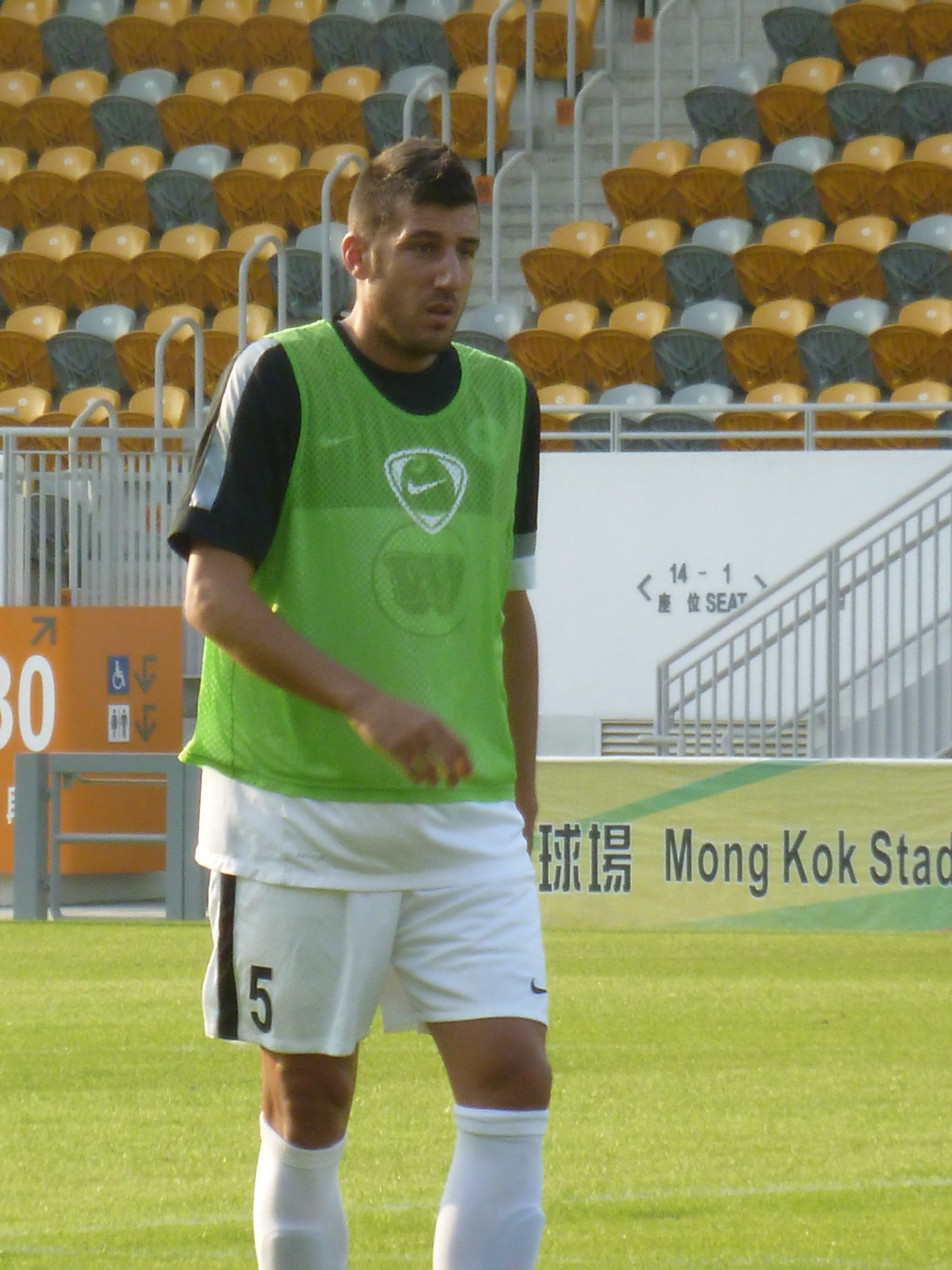

Personal information
- Full name: Rubén López García-Madrid
- Date of birth: 9 July 1979 (age 47)
- Place of birth: Barcelona, Spain
- Height: 1.92 m (6 ft 4 in)
- Position: Centre-back

Team information
- Current team: SE AEM (manager)

Youth career
- Blanes
- 1997–1998: Vilobí

Senior career*
Years	Team	Apps	(Gls)
1998–2001	Vilobí		
2001–2005	Terrassa	95	(2)
2005–2006	Numancia	14	(2)
2006–2007	Terrassa	22	(0)
2007–2008	Vecindario	33	(2)
2008–2010	Melilla	46	(0)
2011	LASK Linz	6	(0)
2011–2012	Palencia	35	(0)
2012–2014	Southern	37	(6)
2014–2015	Yokohama Hong Kong	16	(1)

Managerial career
- 2019–2021: CD Juan Grande
- 2021–2022: CD Femarguín
- 2022–2025: SE AEM
- 2025–: SE AEM
- * Club domestic league appearances and goals as of 18 December 2016

Rubén López García-Madrid (born 9 July 1979) is a Spanish football manager and former player who is the current manager of Primera Federación club SE AEM. He played as a central defender during his football career.

He amassed Segunda División totals of 86 matches and three goals over four seasons, mainly in representation of Terrassa, adding 159 games (three goals) in Segunda División B.

López also played in Austria and Hong Kong.

== Club career ==
=== Terrassa ===
Born in Barcelona, Catalonia, López started his professional career at already 22, with Terrassa FC in Segunda División B. He made his official debut for the club on 7 October 2001 against CD Binéfar, and went on to appear in a further 22 games as the season ended in promotion – he was sent off three times in the process, however.

In the following campaigns, López was only first-choice in 2002–03, starting in 30 of his 34 league appearances whilst often partnering Héctor Bueno. He featured in just 16 matches in 2004–05, as his team returned to the third level.

=== Numancia / Terrassa return ===
López joined Segunda División club CD Numancia before the start of 2005–06. He played regularly during the first half of the season whilst scoring in a 1–1 home draw against Ciudad de Murcia, but featured rarely in the second part, leaving Soria in June 2006.

López returned to Terrassa in July 2006, receiving his marching orders in his first two matches, home fixtures against CD Alcoyano (1–0 win) and UE Lleida (1–1). He left at the end of the division three campaign, and continued to compete in the third tier in the following three years, with UD Vecindario and UD Melilla.

=== LASK Linz ===
In January 2011, López signed for Austrian Football Bundesliga club LASK Linz. He made his debut for his new team on 12 February, against SV Mattersburg.

López started in all his league appearances during his short stint, with the side being relegated at the end of the season.

=== Southern ===
On 13 July 2012, after one season back in his country with CF Palencia, López joined Southern District RSA, newly promoted to the Hong Kong First Division League. He was appointed new team captain the following year, after Wisdom Fofo Agbo's departure.

== Club statistics ==
As of 10 April 2015

Club	Season	League			Cup		Other		Total	
Club	Season	Division	Apps	Goals	Apps	Goals	Apps	Goals	Apps	Goals
Terrassa	2001–02	Segunda División B	23	1	0	0	5	0	28	1
Terrassa	2002–03	Segunda División	34	1	4	0	0	0	38	1
Terrassa	2003–04	Segunda División	22	0	1	0	0	0	23	0
Terrassa	2004–05	Segunda División	16	0	2	0	0	0	18	0
Terrassa	Total		95	2	7	0	5	0	107	2
Numancia	2005–06	Segunda División	14	2	2	0	0	0	16	2
Numancia	Total		14	2	2	0	0	0	16	2
Terrassa	2006–07	Segunda División B	22	0	1	0	0	0	23	0
Terrassa	Total		22	0	1	0	0	0	23	0
Vecindario	2007–08	Segunda División B	33	2	0	0	0	0	33	2
Vecindario	Total		33	2	0	0	0	0	33	2
Melilla	2008–09	Segunda División B	17	0	3	1	0	0	20	1
Melilla	2009–10	Segunda División B	29	0	2	0	0	0	31	0
Melilla	Total		46	0	5	1	0	0	51	1
LASK Linz	2010–11	Austrian Football Bundesliga	6	0	0	0	0	0	6	0
LASK Linz	Total		6	0	0	0	0	0	6	0
Palencia	2011–12	Segunda División B	35	0	1	0	2	0	38	0
Palencia	Total		35	0	1	0	2	0	38	0
Southern	2012–13	Hong Kong First Division League	18	5	6	1	0	0	24	6
Southern	2013–14	Hong Kong First Division League	19	1	4	0	1	0	24	1
Southern	Total		37	6	10	1	1	0	48	7
Yokohama Hong Kong	2014–15	Hong Kong Premier League	13	1	3	0	0	0	16	1
Yokohama Hong Kong	Total		13	1	3	0	0	0	16	1
Career total			301	13	29	2	8	0	338	15
