= Chan Cheuk Kwong =

Hong Kong former footballer (born 1984)

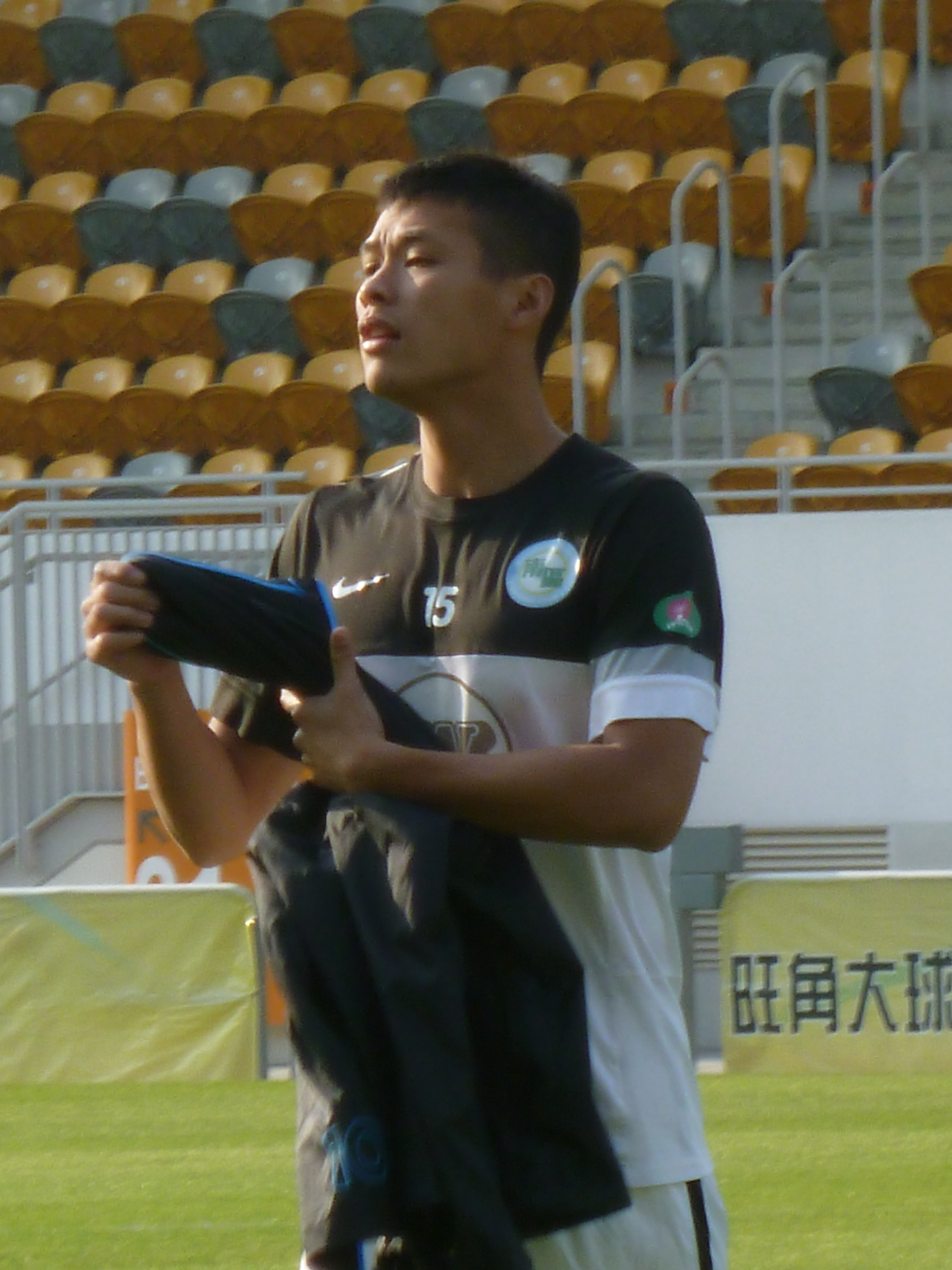

Personal information
- Full name: Chan Cheuk Kwong
- Date of birth: 5 December 1984 (age 41)
- Place of birth: Hong Kong
- Height: 1.83 m (6 ft 0 in)
- Positions: Defensive midfielder; center back

Team information
- Current team: Sham Shui Po
- Number: 13

Senior career*
Years	Team	Apps	(Gls)
2005–2008	Sham Shui Po	8	(0)
2008–2009	Five-One-Seven	3	(0)
2009–2014	Southern	58	(4)
2014–2015	Wong Tai Sin	12	(0)
2015–2016	Yuen Long	9	(1)
2016–2017	Rangers (HKG)	5	(0)
2017–2020	Hoi King	39	(2)
2020–2024	Wong Tai Sin	53	(5)
2024–	Sham Shui Po	48	(0)
- * Club domestic league appearances and goals as of 16 May 2026

Chan Cheuk Kwong (Chinese: 陳卓光; Cantonese Yale: Chàn Cheukgwōng; born 5 December 1984) is a Hong Kong former professional footballer who currently plays for Hong Kong First Division League club Sham Shui Po.

He is renowned for his long throw-in ability, often being compared with former Stoke City midfielder Rory Delap.

== Club career ==
=== Sham Shui Po ===
Chan started his football career with Sham Shui Po, then competing in the third-tier league. In 3 seasons, he only featured 9 matches for the club and was released after the 2007–08 season as the club promoted their full youth team to the first team.

=== Five-One-Seven ===
Chan then followed former Sham Shui Po head coach Fung Hoi Man and joined another Third Division club Five-One-Seven. However, since his full-time job was a fireman, he only played 2 matches for the team and left the team after a season.

=== Southern ===
Chan once again followed Fung Hoi Man and joined fellow Third Division club Southern. He helped the club gain promotion to second-tier league by scoring two goals in nine matches. His long throw-ins were also a key to success.

Chan became a key member of Southern after the club was promoted. He was a regular starting XI and eventually helped the club promote to the Hong Kong First Division for the first time in club history in the 2011–12 season.

As Chan is a fireman off the football pitch, he could not attend every training session. As a result, his role in the club was changed to super sub. He is often substituted in the second half for long throw-ins.

=== Hoi King ===
Having joined Hoi King for the 2017–18 Hong Kong First Division League season, head coach Fung Hoi Man confirmed on 7 June 2018 that Chan would be retained by the club for their 2018–19 Hong Kong Premier League campaign.

== Career statistics ==
=== Club ===
As of 5 May 2013

Club	Season	Division	League		Senior Shield		League Cup		FA Cup		AFC Cup		Total	
Club	Season	Division	Apps	Goals	Apps	Goals	Apps	Goals	Apps	Goals	Apps	Goals	Apps	Goals
Sham Shui Po	2005–06	Third 'District' Division	4	0	0^{1}	0^{1}	N/A	N/A	N/A	N/A	N/A	N/A	4	0
Sham Shui Po	2006–07	Third 'District' Division	3	0	0^{1}	0^{1}	N/A	N/A	N/A	N/A	N/A	N/A	3	0
Sham Shui Po	2007–08	Third 'District' Division	1	0	1^{1}	0^{1}	N/A	N/A	N/A	N/A	N/A	N/A	2	0
Sham Shui Po Total			8	0	1	0	0	0	0	0	0	0	9	0
Five-One-Seven	2008–09	Third 'A' Division	3	0	0^{2}	0^{2}	N/A	N/A	N/A	N/A	N/A	N/A	3	0
Five-One-Seven Total			3	0	0	0	0	0	0	0	0	0	3	0
Southern	2009–10	Third 'District' Division	9	2	—^{3}		N/A	N/A	N/A	N/A	N/A	N/A	9	2
Southern	2010–11	Second Division	15	0	5^{4}	0^{4}	N/A	N/A	N/A	N/A	N/A	N/A	20	0
Southern	2011–12	Second Division	16	0	1^{4}	0^{4}	N/A	N/A	N/A	N/A	N/A	N/A	17	0
Southern	2012–13	First Division	18	2	2	1	—	—	2	0	N/A	N/A	22	3
Southern Total			58	4	8	1	1	0	2	0	0	0	69	5
Total			69	4	9	1	1	0	2	0	0	0	81	5

== Notes ==
1. Since Sham Shui Po was competing in lower divisions, they could only join the Junior Shield instead of Senior Shield.
2. Since Five-One-Seven was competing in lower divisions, they could only join the Junior Shield instead of Senior Shield.
3. Hong Kong Junior Challenge Shield was not held in the 2009–10 season.
4. Since Southern was competing in lower divisions, they could only join the Junior Shield instead of Senior Shield.
