= Alex Tayo Akande =

Nigerian-born Hong Kong footballer

Alex Akande
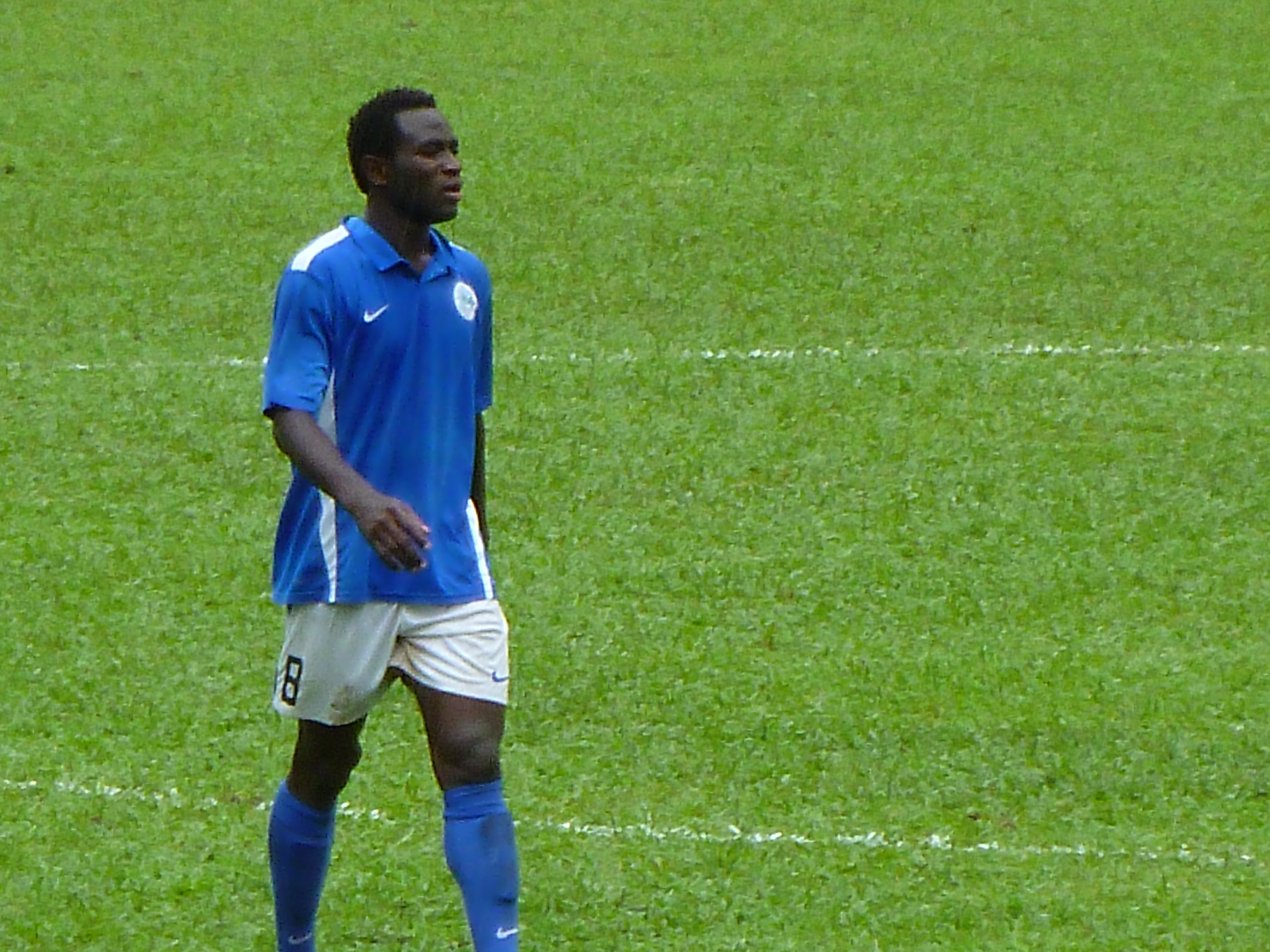

Personal information
- Full name: Alexander Oluwatayo Akande
- Date of birth: 9 February 1989 (age 37)
- Place of birth: Lagos, Nigeria
- Height: 1.82 m (6 ft 0 in)
- Positions: Striker; midfielder

Senior career*
Years	Team	Apps	(Gls)
2008–2009	Tai Chung	7	(7)
2009	Eastern	16	(6)
2009–2010	Kitchee	10	(4)
2009–2010	→ Tai Chung (loan)	12	(4)
2010–2011	Tai Chung	19	(3)
2011–2012	Rangers (HKG)	2	(1)
2012	→ HK Sapling (loan)	10	(7)
2012–2013	Tai Po	18	(13)
2013–2018	Kitchee	51	(24)
2018	Yanbian Fude	16	(2)
2019–2021	Dalian Pro	3	(0)
2021–2023	Kitchee	19	(0)
2023	Shanghai Jiading Huilong	7	(0)

International career^{‡}
2015–2022	Hong Kong	29	(10)
- * Club domestic league appearances and goals as of 31 December 2023 ‡ National team caps and goals as of 24 September 2022

Alexander Oluwatayo Akande (Chinese: 艾力士; born 9 February 1989), more commonly known as Alex Akande or Alex Tayo Akande, is a former professional footballer who played as a striker. Born in Nigeria, he played for the Hong Kong national football team.

== Club career ==
=== Tai Chung and Eastern ===
Akande arrived in Hong Kong in 2008 and played for Tai Chung in the Hong Kong Second Division League. His prolific performance soon drew interest of First Division side Eastern. Akande joined Eastern in January 2009 and finished the season with 6 goals.

=== Tai Chung and Kitchee ===
Akande returned to Tai Chung in the 2009–10 season. After scoring 3 goals in 12 matches for Tai Chung in half a season, he joined Kitchee in mid-season following the departure of Kitchee's Spanish striking duo Albert Virgili Fort and Raul Torres.

The transfer also gave Akande an opportunity to play in the 2010 Lunar New Year Cup as he played for Kitchee against Pegasus Invitation team and Korean side Pohang Steelers. In two 45 minutes matches, Akande scored against Pegasus Invitation in a 1–0 win and assisted his teammates in a 1–1 draw against the 2009 AFC Champions League winner. Despite losing the title to Pohang Steelers due to one less goal scored, Akande was named the MVP of the tournament.

Akande scored 4 more goals for Kitchee in local competitions during his half-season spell .

=== Tai Chung ===
Akande once again returned to Tai Chung and played a full season for the team in the 2010–11 season. His 3 goals in 19 matches were not enough to save Tai Chung from relegation.

=== Rangers and Hong Kong Sapling ===
Akande's 4th season in Hong Kong began with joining Rangers. He was loaned to Hong Kong Sapling, a development team formed by the Hong Kong Football Association, in the mid-season after a slow start at Rangers.

Akande found his scoring touch soon after joining Hong Kong Sapling, where he scored 9 goals in 12 matches. However the HKFA decided not to continue running Hong Kong Sapling after the team failed to avoid relegation. As a result, Hong Kong Sapling were disbanded after the season.

=== Tai Po ===
Akande joined another Hong Kong First Division club Tai Po in the 2012–13 season, in which he played one of his best seasons in his career. He scored 5 goals including a hat-trick against Tuen Mun in the quarter-final for the 2012–13 Senior Shield that contributed the team's first ever title-triumph in the tournament. He finished the season with a tally of 19 goals in all competitions.

His performance also earned him a place in the Hong Kong League XI for the 2013 Lunar New Year Cup where he played against Busan I'Park from Korea and Muangthong United from Thailand in this annual International tournament.

However, despite his prolific performance up front, the team's vulnerable defense cost them the place in the top-tier league. Tai Po were involved in a relegation battle-turmoil in which totally 6 teams were fighting to avoid relegation on the final day of the league. He opened the score for Tai Po in a huge battle against Yokohama FC Hong Kong, another team in this turmoil. Yet Tai Po conceded a heart-breaking final-second goal which cancelled their lead and sent them to relegation dramatically.

=== Second spell at Kitchee ===
Following the relegation of Tai Po, Akande rejoined Kitchee. The club began the season with an International exhibition match with Manchester United. He had the chance to play against the defending Premier League champions, and scored a brilliant goal in the 2–5 defeat as he turned Man United's defender Alex Buttner inside out before firing home.

Akande also had his first opportunity in continental competition as he was chosen as one of the four foreign players for the 2013 AFC Cup quarter-final match against Al-Faisaly from Jordan. Kitchee lost the 1st leg at home in a 1–2 defeat to the Jordanian side with Akande once equalized the score in the early 2nd half. Kitchee were eliminated from the competition with a same scoreline in the 2nd leg.

The season ended well for both Kitchee and Akande, as Kitchee had an invincible season as the league champions with 16 points above the runners-up Pegasus, while Akande added 10 more goals to his tally in all local competitions.

Kitchee began their new season with an international exhibition match against PSG at Hong Kong Stadium on 29 July 2014. Akande once again found the back of the net against a European giant in this 2–6 defeat with Zlatan Ibrahimovic scored a hat-trick.

The same season Kitchee appointed former Spanish International and Atletico Madrid goalkeeper José Francisco Molina as their head coach. Aiming for higher success in the 2014 AFC Cup and the 2015 AFC Champions League Playoffs. However Akande picked up an injury in a training session in early season which forced him to miss the rest of the season. After a successful surgery he went to the United States for his rehab with specialized physical therapy. The rehab was a success and he was ready to return for the next season.

=== Dalian Yifang ===
Following the bankruptcy of Yanbian Fude, Akande moved to Chinese Super League club Dalian Yifang on 28 February 2019. He made his debut three days later in a 1–1 draw against Henan Jianye.

=== Third spell at Kitchee ===
Having made only a few appearances for Dalian, Akande was released by the club. On 31 March 2021, Kitchee confirmed that Akande has rejoined the club.

=== Shanghai Jiading Huilong ===
On 1 July 2023, Akande joined China League One club Shanghai Jiading Huilong.

== International career ==
Akande was born in Nigeria, but after living for more than seven years in Hong Kong, he obtained his Hong Kong residency and became eligible to play for the Hong Kong national team in October 2015. He was immediately called up by the Hong Kong national team for the friendly match against Myanmar on 7 November 2015 at Mongkok Stadium. Akande made his international debut in this match and scored his first international goal for Hong Kong in the 5–0 victory. He soon made his international debut for Hong Kong in a friendly match against Myanmar on 7 November 2015. He also scored on his debut in this 5–0 win.

Akande started in the 2018 World Cup AFC qualification second round match against Maldives on 12 November 2015 in which Hong Kong defeated the home side in a narrow 1–0 win. He then played against China and Qatar in the same competition. Hong Kong finished the group stage as the 2nd runners-up and secured a direct entry to the 2019 Asian Cup qualifying third round.

Since making his International debut and the managerial change of Kitchee in mid-season, Akande has recovered his scoring form before the injury by scoring 10 goals in 18 matches including 2 goals in the League Cup final victory which saw Kitchee lifted this trophy for the historical fifth times.

On 9 November 2016, Akande scored four goals to lead Hong Kong to a 4–2 victory over Chinese Taipei in the 2017 EAFF East Asian Cup Second Round.

Akande played all the remaining three 2018 World Cup AFC qualification second round matches of the Hong Kong national team against Maldives, China and Qatar. Hong Kong completed the group stage as the 2nd runners-up and secured a direct entry to the 2019 Asian Cup qualifying third round.

== Career statistics ==
=== Club ===
Statistics accurate as of match played 31 December 2020.

Appearances and goals by club, season and competition
Club	Season	League			National Cup		Continental		Other		Total	
Club	Season	Division	Apps	Goals	Apps	Goals	Apps	Goals	Apps	Goals	Apps	Goals
Advance Tai Chung	2008–09	Hong Kong Second Division League	7	7	3	3	–		0 (Note: Appearances in Hong Kong Senior Challenge Shield)	0	10	10
Eastern	2008–09	Hong Kong First Division League	13	3	3	3	–		0	0	16	6
Kitchee	2009–10	Hong Kong First Division League	9	4	1	0	–		0	0	10	4
Tai Chung (loan)	2009–10	Hong Kong First Division League	10	4	2	0	–		0	0	12	4
Tai Chung	2010–11	Hong Kong First Division League	17	3	3	0	–		0	0	20	3
Rangers	2011–12	Hong Kong First Division League	3	2	1	0	–		0	0	4	2
Hong Kong Sapling (loan)	2011–12	Hong Kong First Division League	10	7	2	2	–		0	0	12	9
Tai Po	2012–13	Hong Kong First Division League	18	13	5	2	–		7	4	30	19
Kitchee	2013–14	Hong Kong First Division League	16	7	1	0	–		1	0	18	7
Kitchee	2014–15	Hong Kong Premier League	1	0	0	0	0	0	0	0	1	0
Kitchee	2015–16	Hong Kong Premier League	13	7	0	0	0	0	2	0	15	7
Kitchee	2016–17	Hong Kong Premier League	11	5	3	0	2	1	1	0	17	6
Kitchee	2017–18	Hong Kong Premier League	10	5	2	2	6	0	2	1	20	8
Kitchee	Total		51	24	6	2	8	1	6	1	71	28
Yanbian Fude	2018	China League One	16	2	0	0	-		-		16	2
Dalian Pro	2019	Chinese Super League	3	0	1	0	-		-		4	0
Career total			157	69	27	12	8	1	13	5	205	87

=== International ===
As of matches played 24 September 2022

National team	Year	Apps	Goals
Hong Kong	2015	3	1
Hong Kong	2016	7	8
Hong Kong	2017	6	0
Hong Kong	2018	6	1
Hong Kong	2019	5	0
Hong Kong	2020	0	0
Hong Kong	2021	0	0
Hong Kong	2022	2	0
Total		29	10

=== International goals ===
Scores and results list Hong Kong's goal tally first.

No	Date	Venue	Opponent	Score	Result	Competition
1.	7 November 2015	Mong Kok Stadium, Mong Kok, Hong Kong	Myanmar	5–0	5–0	Friendly
2.	6 October 2016	Olympic Stadium, Phnom Penh, Cambodia	Cambodia	2–0	2–0	Friendly
3.	11 October 2016	Mong Kok Stadium, Mong Kok, Hong Kong	Singapore	1–0	2–0	Friendly
4.	6 November 2016	Mong Kok Stadium, Mong Kok, Hong Kong	Guam	1–0	3–2	2017 EAFF E-1 Football Championship qualification
5.	6 November 2016	Mong Kok Stadium, Mong Kok, Hong Kong	Guam	3–0	3–2	2017 EAFF E-1 Football Championship qualification
6.	9 November 2016	Mong Kok Stadium, Mong Kok, Hong Kong	Chinese Taipei	1–0	4–2	2017 EAFF E-1 Football Championship qualification
7.	9 November 2016	Mong Kok Stadium, Mong Kok, Hong Kong	Chinese Taipei	2–0	4–2	2017 EAFF E-1 Football Championship qualification
8.	9 November 2016	Mong Kok Stadium, Mong Kok, Hong Kong	Chinese Taipei	3–1	4–2	2017 EAFF E-1 Football Championship qualification
9.	9 November 2016	Mong Kok Stadium, Mong Kok, Hong Kong	Chinese Taipei	4–1	4–2	2017 EAFF E-1 Football Championship qualification
10.	16 November 2018	Taipei Municipal Stadium, Taipei, Taiwan	Mongolia	5–1	5–1	2019 EAFF E-1 Football Championship qualification

== Honour ==
=== Club ===
Tai Po

- Hong Kong Senior Shield: 2012–13

Kitchee

- Hong Kong Premier League: 2014–15, 2016–17, 2017–18, 2020–21, 2022–23
- Hong Kong First Division: 2013–14
- Hong Kong Senior Shield: 2016–17, 2022–23
- Hong Kong FA Cup: 2016–17, 2017–18, 2022–23
- Hong Kong Sapling Cup: 2017–18, 2019–20
- Hong Kong League Cup: 2015–16
- Hong Kong Community Cup: 2016–17
