= Chan Hin Kwong =

Hong Kong footballer

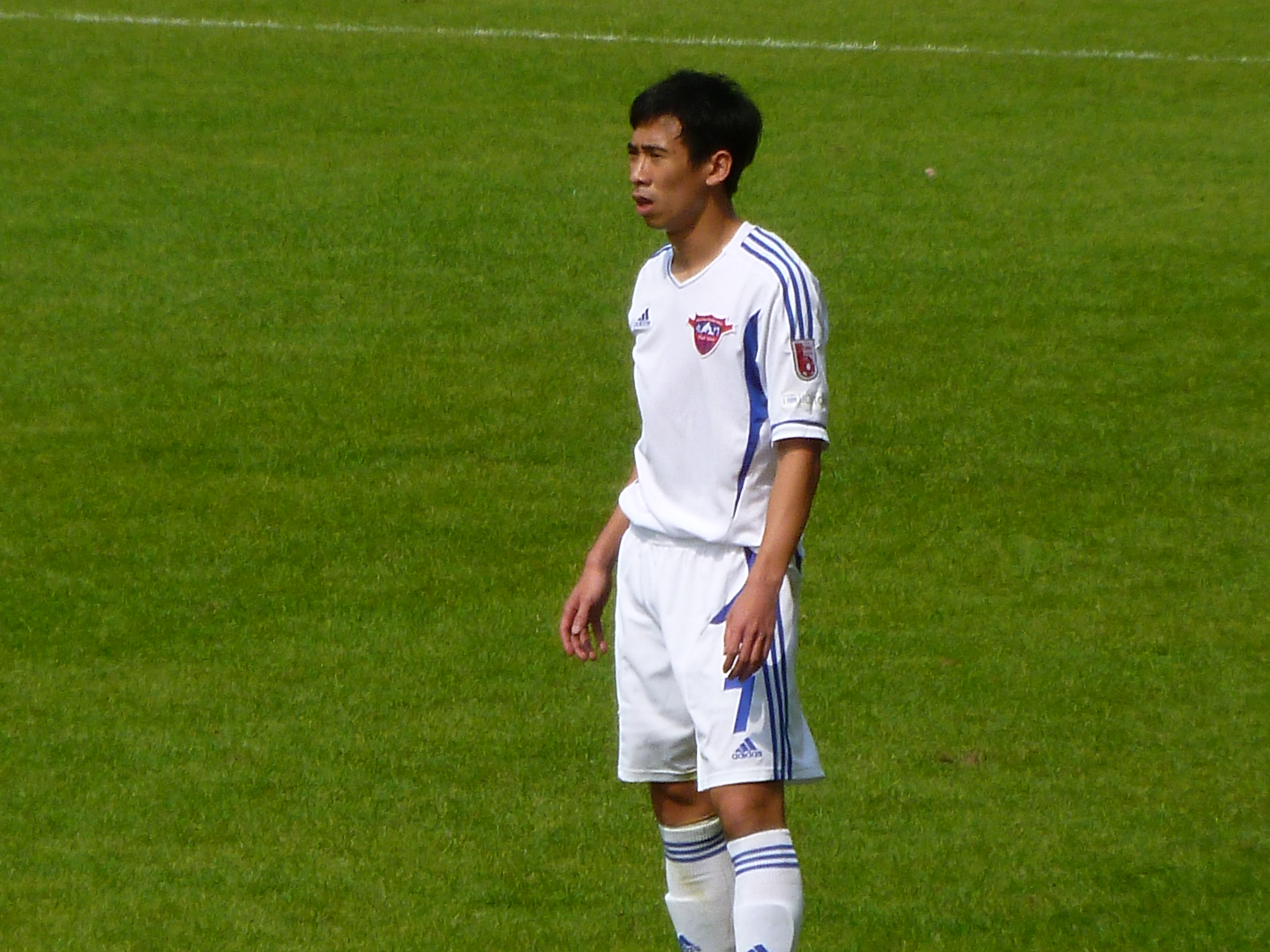

Personal information
- Full name: Chan Hin Kwong
- Date of birth: 27 February 1988 (age 38)
- Place of birth: New Territories, Hong Kong
- Height: 1.78 m (5 ft 10 in)
- Position: Left back

Youth career
- 2005–2006: Rangers

Senior career*
Years	Team	Apps	(Gls)
2006–2010	Tai Po	29	(1)
2010–2012	Tuen Mun	37	(0)
2012–2014	Citizen	22	(0)
2014–2018	Yuen Long	53	(1)
2018–2020	Lee Man	10	(0)
2020–2021	Yuen Long	3	(0)
2021–2022	Gospel		
2023–	Double Flower		
- * Club domestic league appearances and goals

Chan Hin Kwong (Chinese: 陳衍光; Jyutping: can^{4} hin^{2} gwong^{1}; born 27 February 1988) is a former Hong Kong professional footballer who played as a left back.

== Club career ==
=== Tai Po ===
Chan Hin Kwong joined the newly promoted side Tai Po in 2006. Starting from the 2007–08 season, he got more chances in Tai Po and has become an important player since 2008. However, in the 2008–09 season. he was confirmed to be out for the remainder of the season after he suffered an anterior cruciate ligament injury on 18 November 2008.

On 20 March 2010, he scored the first Hong Kong First Division goal of his football career in the match against Kitchee.

=== Tuen Mun ===
In the summer of 2010, Chan Hin Kwong joined newly promoted side Tuen Mun. He helped Tuen Mun to avoid the drop that year. In the 2011–12 season, he scored his first ever goal for the club in a match against Sun Hei on 24 December 2011. At the end of the season, he confirmed that he would not stay at Tuen Mun.

=== Citizen ===
On 8 June 2012, Citizen announced that they have signed Chan. He made his debut for Citizen on 22 September 2012. He played the whole match to help the team defeat Rangers 5–1 in the first leg of the first round of the Senior Shield at Sham Shui Po Sports Ground.

=== Yuen Long FC ===
He joined Yuen Long in 2014.

=== Lee Man ===
On 21 May 2018, Lee Man announced that they had signed Chan.

On 2 June 2020, Chan was named on a list of departures from the club. However, on 3 September 2020, Chan rejoined the club on a short-term deal until the end of the 2019–20 season.

== Career statistics ==
=== Club ===
As of 25 September 2012

Club	Season	League		Senior Shield		League Cup		FA Cup		AFC Cup		Total	
Club	Season	Apps	Goals	Apps	Goals	Apps	Goals	Apps	Goals	Apps	Goals	Apps	Goals
Wofoo Tai Po	2006–07	0	0	0	0	0	0	0	0	N/A	N/A	0	0
Wofoo Tai Po	2007–08	3	0	0	0	2	0	0	0	N/A	N/A	5	0
Wofoo Tai Po	2008–09	10	0	0	0	0	0	0	0	N/A	N/A	10	0
Wofoo Tai Po	2009–10	8	1	2	0	0	0	1	0	2	0	13	1
Tai Po Total		21	1	2	0	2	0	1	0	2	0	28	1
Tuen Mun	2010–11	16	0	1	0	1	0	2	0	N/A	N/A	20	0
Tuen Mun	2011–12	12	0	4	1	1	0	1	0	N/A	N/A	18	1
Tuen Mun Total		28	0	5	1	2	0	3	0	0	0	38	1
Citizen	2012–13	0	0	1	0	0	0	0	0	N/A	N/A	1	0
Citizen Total		0	0	1	0	0	0	0	0	0	0	1	0
Career Total		49	1	8	1	4	0	4	0	2	0	67	2

== Honours ==
=== Club ===
Lee Man

- Hong Kong Sapling Cup: 2018–19
