= Thiago Constância =

Brazilian footballer

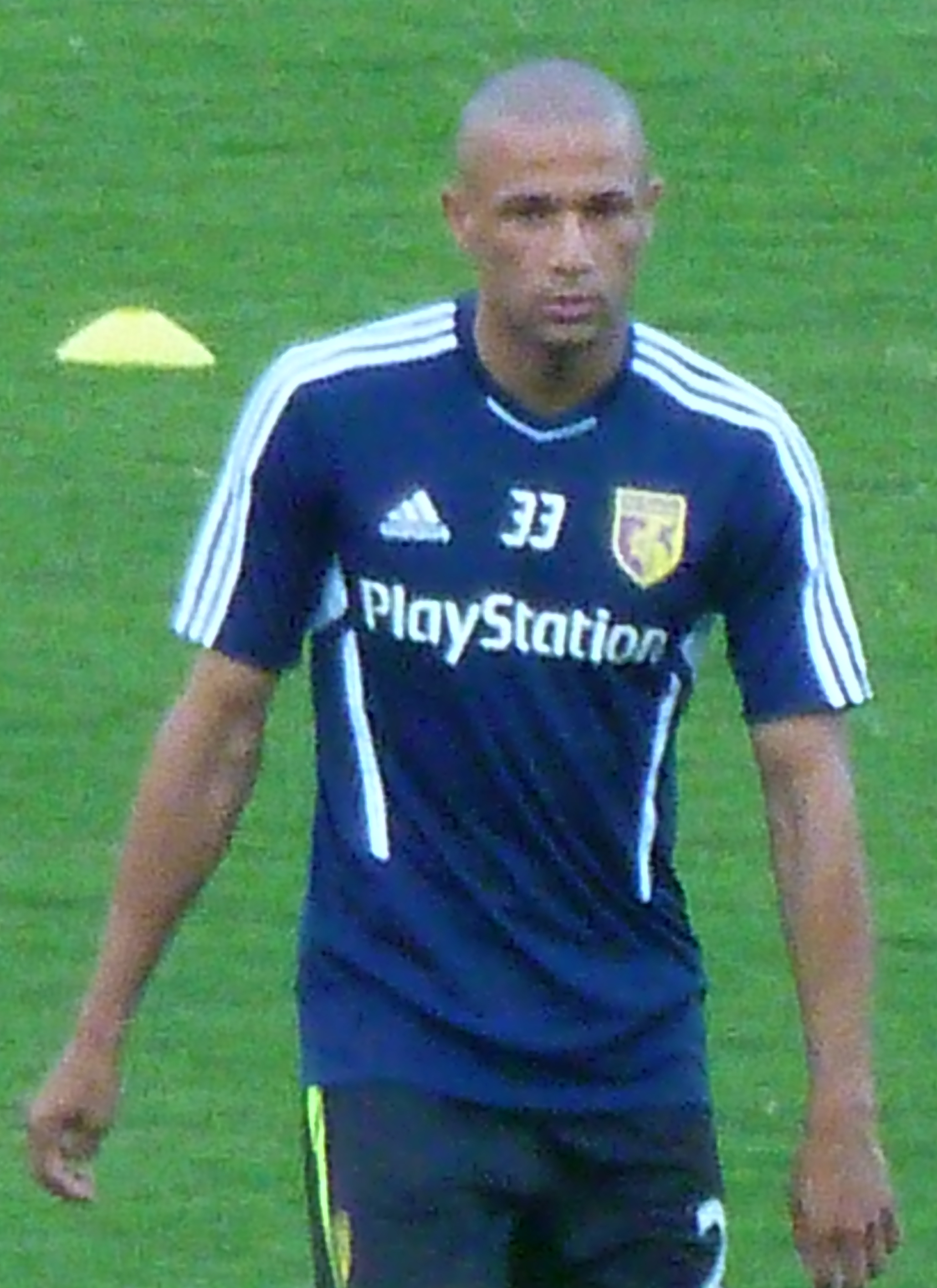
- Thiago in 2012

Personal information
- Full name: Thiago Alberto Constância
- Date of birth: 21 December 1984 (age 41)
- Place of birth: São Paulo, Brazil
- Height: 1.82 m (6 ft 0 in)
- Position: Forward

Youth career
- Guarani

Senior career*
| Years | Team | Apps | (Gls) |
| 2003–2004 | Paraná | | |
| 2004–2005 | Feyenoord | 0 | (0) |
| 2005 | União Bandeirante | | |
| 2005–2006 | Cabofriense | 1 | (0) |
| 2006 | Bragantino | 0 | (0) |
| 2006–2008 | Sheriff Tiraspol | 37 | (8) |
| 2008–2010 | Dinamo București | 6 | (0) |
| 2010–2011 | Karpaty Lviv | 2 | (0) |
| 2012 | Sun Pegasus | 4 | (1) |
| 2013 | Camboriú | 6 | (2) |
| 2014 | Juventus Jaraguá | | |
| 2019 | Guaporé | | |

Managerial career
- 2019: Guaporé U20
- 2019–2020: Itararé (assistant)
- 2021: Nacional de Muriaé U20
- 2021: Anapolina U20
- 2022: Taquaritinga U20
- 2023: Costa Rica (assistant)
- 2023: Costa Rica (interim)
- 2023: Patrocinense (assistant)
- 2023: Mauá
- 2023–2024: Água Santa U20
- 2024: Flamengo-SP
- 2024: Portuguesa U20
- * Club domestic league appearances and goals

Thiago Alberto Constância (born 21 December 1984) is a Brazilian football coach and former player who played as a forward.

He was also known as Thiagão in his early career.

== Playing career ==
Born in São Paulo, Thiago left for União Bandeirante in 2005. In June 2005 he signed a 3-year contract with Cabofriense. He played once for the club at 2005 Campeonato Brasileiro Série C, on 28 August 2005. He replaced Tenório at half time. The match Cabofriense won Volta Redonda 1–0. He failed to make any appearances in 2006 Campeonato Brasileiro Série C.

In August 2006, Thiago returned to São Paulo state, signed a 1 1/2-year contract with Bragantino. That calendar year Bragantino failed to qualify for national league and participated in 2006 Copa FPF.

In October 2006 he completed a transfer to Moldovan side Sheriff Tiraspol along with Nadson José Ferreira.

In June 2008 he left for Romanian club Dinamo București, reported cost €450,000.

In October 2010, Thiago moved to Ukraine for Karpaty Lviv, signed a 3-year contract, re-joined Aleh Konanaw, former assistant coach of Sheriff.

In late September 2012, Thiago joined Hong Kong First Division League side Sun Pegasus. He played 6 games and scored 2 goals for the club.

In 2013, Thiago joined Camboriú to play the second half of the Campeonato Catarinense. He played 6 games and scored 2 goals for the club.

== Honours ==
- Copa Paulista de Futebol: 2006 (Bragantino)
- Moldovan National Division: 2007, 2008
- Moldovan Cup: 2008
- Moldovan Super Cup: 2007
