= Wisdom Fofo Agbo =

Hong Kong footballer

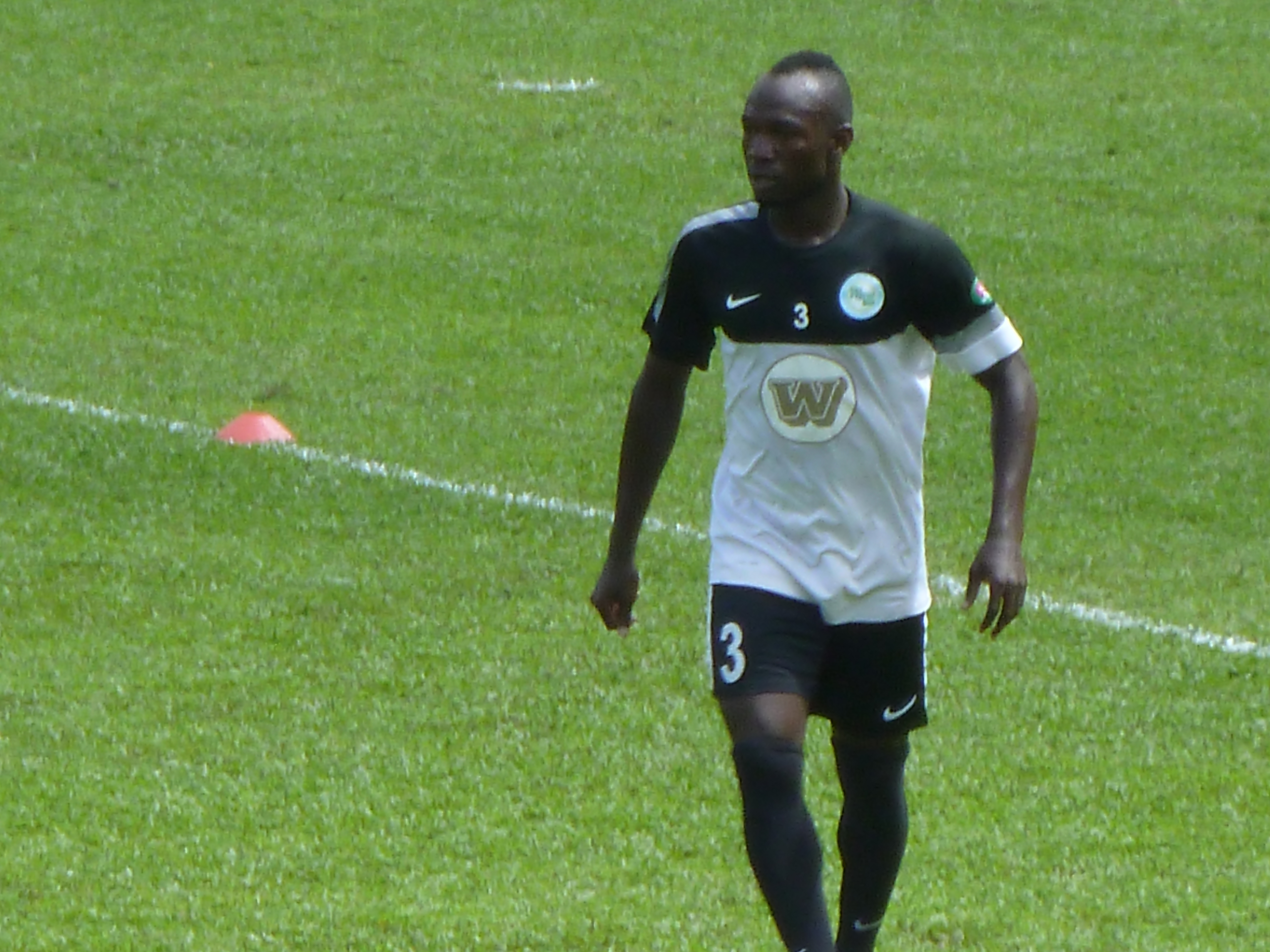
- Fofo in 2012

Personal information
- Full name: Wisdom Fofo Agbo
- Date of birth: 25 June 1979 (age 47)
- Place of birth: Tamale, Ghana
- Height: 1.75 m (5 ft 9 in)
- Positions: Defensive midfielder; centre back

Senior career*
Years	Team	Apps	(Gls)
2003–2004	Kui Tan		
2004–2008	Hong Kong Rangers	60	(2)
2008–2011	Pegasus	54	(1)
2012–2013	Southern	17	(0)
2013–2014	Harbin Yiteng	26	(0)
2015	Pegasus	0	(0)
2015	Liaoning Whowin	0	(0)
2016–2017	South China	5	(0)

International career
2013–2014	Hong Kong	11	(0)
- * Club domestic league appearances and goals

Wisdom Fofo Agbo (Chinese: 科夫 Fofo; born 25 June 1979) is a former professional footballer who played as a defensive midfielder. Born in Ghana, he represented Hong Kong at international level.

== Club career ==
Fofo went on a trial to Guizhou Zhicheng on 13 June 2013. However, he did not play in the friendly match against Guizhou Renhe since he had to come back to Hong Kong to handle some personal issues.

After an unsuccessful trial at Guizhou Zhicheng, Fofo is reportedly close to joining Harbin Yiteng. On 8 July 2013, Fofo officially signed a six-month contract with Harbin Yiteng, becoming the second naturalised Hong Kong player, after his compatriot Godfred Karikari, to play in China League One.

On 27 February 2015, Fofo transferred to Chinese Super League side Liaoning Whowin.

== International career ==
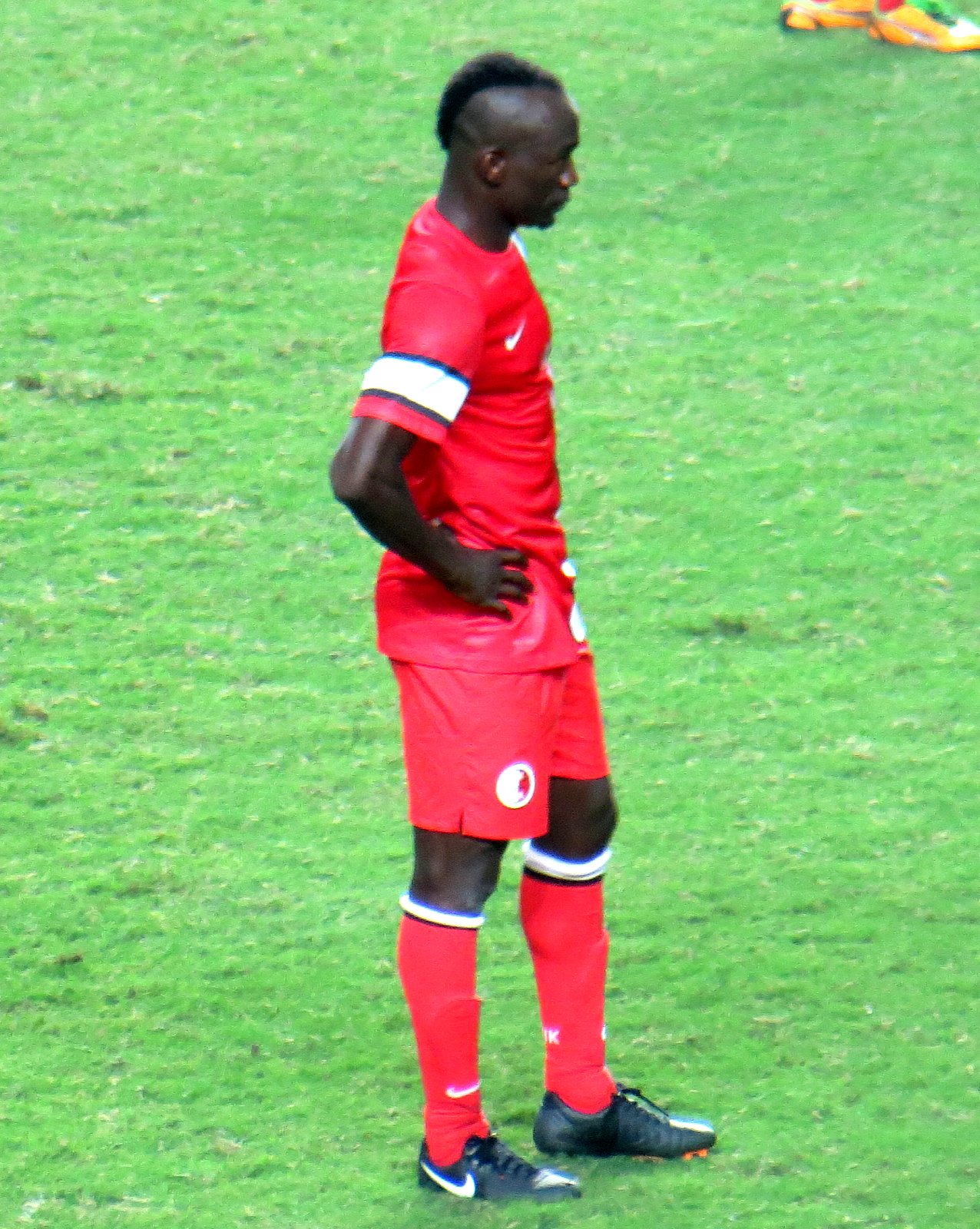
Fofo playing for Hong Kong.

Fofo received his Hong Kong Permanent Identity Card on 7 February 2011. He successfully obtained his Hong Kong passport in May 2013, thus making him eligible to play for Hong Kong. He received his first international cap for the match against Philippines but he didn't come off the bench eventually. He made his debut for Hong Kong on 6 September 2013 against Myanmar.

== Career statistics ==
=== Club ===
As of 11 September 2009

Club	Season	League		Senior Shield		League Cup		FA Cup		AFC Cup		Total	
Club	Season	Apps	Goals	Apps	Goals	Apps	Goals	Apps	Goals	Apps	Goals	Apps	Goals
Pegasus	2008–09	22 (1)	1	4 (0)	0	4 (0)	0	4 (0)	0	N/A	N/A	34 (1)	1
Pegasus	2009–10	5 (0)	0	0 (0)	0	0 (0)	0	0 (0)	0	N/A	N/A	5 (0)	0
Pegasus	All	27 (1)	1	4 (0)	0	4 (0)	0	4 (0)	0	N/A	N/A	39 (1)	1

=== International ===
As of 19 November 2014

National team	Year	Apps	Goals
Hong Kong	2013	3	0
Hong Kong	2014	8	0
Total		11	0

As of 5 March 2014

#	Date	Venue	Opponent	Result	Scored	Competition
	6 September 2013	Thuwunna Stadium, Yangon, Myanmar	Myanmar	0–0	0	Friendly
1	10 September 2013	Mong Kok Stadium, Mong Kok, Hong Kong	Singapore	1–0	0	Friendly
2	15 October 2013	Hong Kong Stadium, So Kon Po, Hong Kong	United Arab Emirates	0–4	0	2015 AFC Asian Cup qualification
3	19 November 2013	Hong Kong Stadium, So Kon Po, Hong Kong	Uzbekistan	0–2	0	2015 AFC Asian Cup qualification
4	5 March 2014	Mỹ Đình National Stadium, Hanoi, Vietnam	Vietnam	1–3	0	2015 AFC Asian Cup qualification

== Honours ==
Hong Kong

- Guangdong-Hong Kong Cup: 2013
