= Jonathan Carril =

Spanish professional footballer

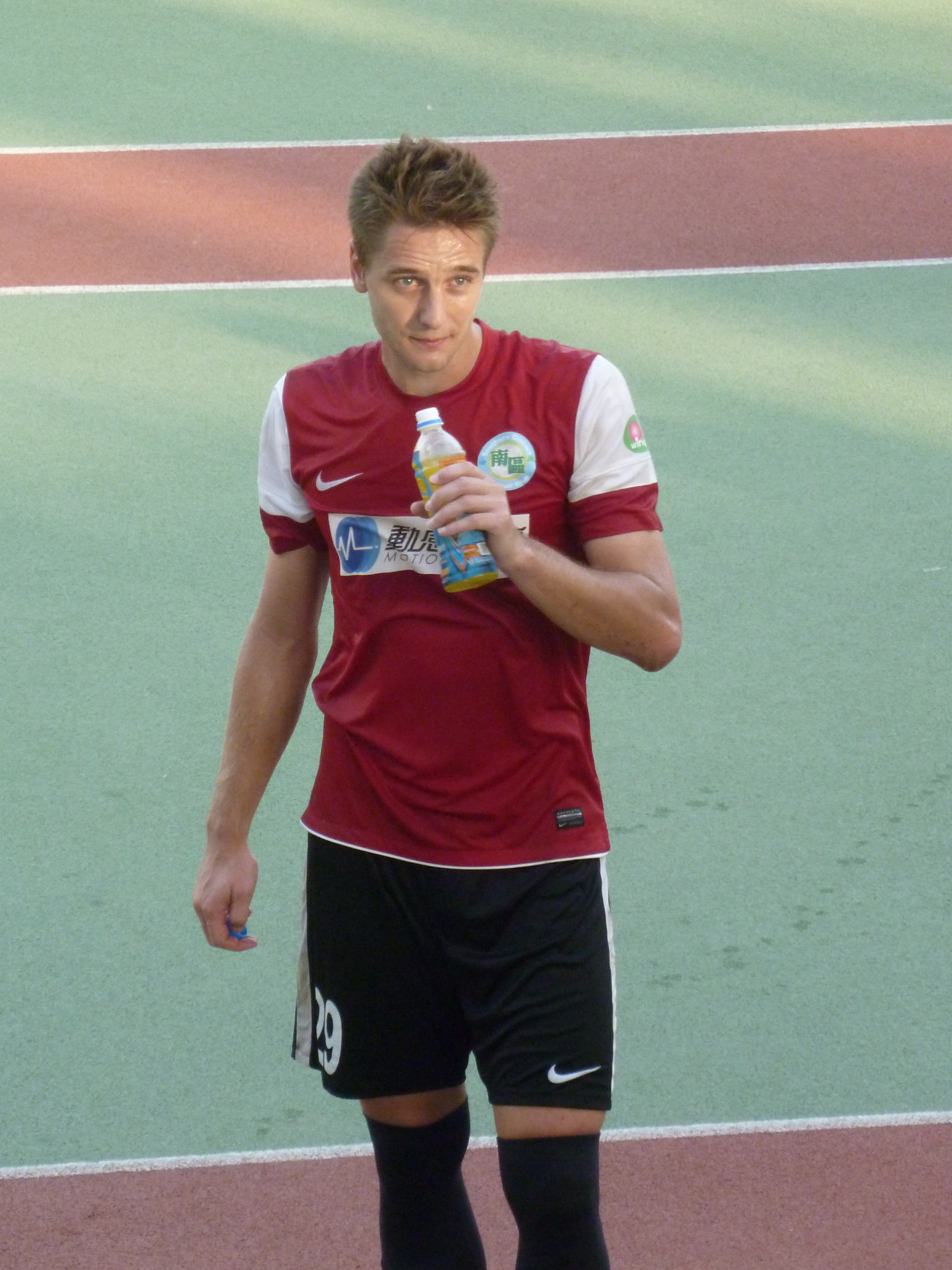

Personal information
- Full name: Jonathan Carril Regueiro
- Date of birth: 28 February 1984 (age 42)
- Place of birth: Boqueixón, Spain
- Height: 1.88 m (6 ft 2 in)
- Position: Centre forward

Youth career
- 2001–2002: Barcelona

Senior career*
Years	Team	Apps	(Gls)
2003–2005	Deportivo La Coruña B		
2005	Atlético Madrid B	5	(0)
2006	Levante B	33	(5)
2007	Racing Ferrol	14	(7)
2007–2008	Linares	14	(0)
2008	Villa Santa Brígida	17	(4)
2009	Santa Eulàlia	13	(0)
2009–2010	SV Ried	14	(1)
2010–2011	SV Grödig	18	(5)
2011–2012	Palencia	34	(7)
2012–2013	Kitchee	4	(3)
2012–2013	→ Southern (loan)	13	(5)
2013–2016	Southern	30	(10)
- * Club domestic league appearances and goals as of 9 July 2017

Jonathan Carril Regueiro (born 28 February 1984) is a Spanish professional footballer who plays as a centre forward.

== Football career ==
=== Early years / Austria ===
Carril was born in Boqueixón, A Coruña, Galicia. After years of playing only for amateur clubs or reserve squads (Deportivo de La Coruña B, Atlético Madrid B, Levante UD B, Racing de Ferrol, CD Linares, UD Villa de Santa Brígida and Santa Eulàlia), he moved in summer 2009 to Austria, joining SV Ried in the Bundesliga.

On 13 March 2010, Carril scored his first goal in the Austrian top flight, in a 3–0 home win against SV Mattersburg for the season's 27th round. In June, he switched to another team in the country, SV Grödig.

=== Hong Kong ===
On 29 May 2012, Kitchee SC general manager Ken Ng announced that Carril would be joining the club, and the transfer was confirmed three days later. He made an impressive debut, netting twice in a 3–0 win over Sun Hei SC; however, the signing of compatriot Pablo Couñago saw him loaned out to Southern District RSA for the rest of the season due to foreign player restriction quotas, and he also scored in his maiden appearance, against Sun Pegasus FC in a 3–3 draw.

On 19 May 2013, Carril joined Southern District on a permanent contract.

== Personal life ==
Carril's younger brother, Iván, was also a footballer. Both had a very brief youth spell at FC Barcelona, before finishing their footballing formation at local Deportivo de La Coruña.

== Club statistics ==
As of 2 June 2014

Club	Season	League			Cup		Other		Total	
Club	Season	Division	Apps	Goals	Apps	Goals	Apps	Goals	Apps	Goals
Atlético Madrid B	2005–06	Segunda División B	5	0	0	0	0	0	5	0
Atlético Madrid B	Total		5	0	0	0	0	0	5	0
Levante B	2005–06	Segunda División B	18	3	0	0	2	0	20	3
Levante B	2006–07	Segunda División B	13	2	0	0	0	0	13	2
Levante B	Total		31	5	0	0	2	0	33	5
Ferrol	2006–07	Segunda División B	14	7	0	0	4	1	18	8
Ferrol	Total		14	7	0	0	4	1	18	8
Linares	2007–08	Segunda División B	14	0	1	0	0	0	15	0
Linares	Total		14	0	1	0	0	0	15	0
Santa Brigida	2008–09	Segunda División B	17	4	0	0	0	0	17	4
Santa Brigida	Total		17	4	0	0	0	0	17	4
Santa Eulalia	2008–09	Segunda División B	13	0	0	0	0	0	13	0
Santa Eulalia	Total		13	0	0	0	0	0	13	0
SV Ried	2009–10	Austrian Football Bundesliga	14	1	2	2	0	0	16	4
SV Ried	Total		14	1	2	2	0	0	16	4
SV Grödig	2010–11	Austrian Football First League	18	5	2	2	0	0	20	7
SV Grödig	Total		18	5	2	2	0	0	20	7
Palencia	2011–12	Segunda División B	36	8	1	0	2	1	39	9
Palencia	Total		36	8	1	0	2	1	39	9
Kitchee	2012–13	First Division League	4	3	0	0	0	0	4	3
Kitchee	Total		4	3	0	0	0	0	4	3
Southern District	2012–13	First Division League	13	5	6	2	0	0	19	7
Southern District	2013–14	First Division League	17	9	4	3	1	0	22	12
Southern District	Total		30	14	10	5	1	0	41	19
Career total			196	47	16	9	9	2	221	58
