= 2012–13 Tuen Mun SA season =

Tuen Mun
2012–13 season
- President: Lau Wong Fat
- Head Coach: Yan Lik Kin
- Ground: Tuen Mun Tang Shiu Kin Sports Ground
- First Division: 3rd
- Senior Shield: Quarter-finals
- FA Cup: Quarter-finals
- Top goalscorer: League: Daniel Goulart Quevedo (7); All: Daniel Goulart Quevedo (10)
- Highest home attendance: 1,311 (16 March vs South China, First Division)
- Lowest home attendance: 619 (20 October vs Biu Chun Rangers, First Division)
- Average home league attendance: 812 (In all competitions)
Home colours	Away colours

The 2012–13 season is Tuen Mun Sports Association's 3rd consecutive season in the Hong Kong First Division League, the top flight of Hong Kong football. Tuen Mun will seek to win their first trophy in two seasons, competing in the Hong Kong First Division League, the Hong Kong League Cup and the Hong Kong FA Cup after finishing 6th in the previous First Division League season.

== Key events ==
- 16 June 2012: Hong Kong midfielder Lai Yiu Cheong joins the club from 2011–12 Hong Kong First Division League runner-up TSW Pegasus for an undisclosed fee.
- 1 August 2012: Hong Kong midfielder Li Haiqiang joins the club from Hong Kong First Division League club South China for free.
- 30 October 2012: Due to the divestment of president Chan Keung, which may lead to financial problems, various key players, including Li Haiqiang, Yip Tsz Chun, Ling Cong and 4 foreign players, as well as the whole coaching team, were released by the club.
- 2 November 2012: All 4 foreign players, Beto, Diego Eli Moreira, Mauricio Correa Da Luz and Daniel Goulart Quevedo, will stay with their salaries decrease.

== Players ==
=== Squad information ===
As of 3 November 2012

Note: Flags indicate national team as defined under FIFA eligibility rules; some limited exceptions apply. Players may hold more than one non-FIFA nationality.

No.	Pos.	Nation	Player
1	GK	HKG	Siu Leong
2	DF	HKG	Kwok Wing Sun
3	MF	BRA	Diego Eli Moreira
4	DF	CHN	Li Ming
5	DF	HKG	Cheng Ting Chi
6	DF	BRA	Mauricio Correa Da Luz
7	MF	HKG	Ling Cong
8	MF	HKG	Chow Cheuk Fung
9	FW	BRA	Daniel Goulart Quevedo
10	FW	HKG	Chan Pak Hei
11	FW	HKG	Yip Tsz Chun
12	DF	CHN	Xie Silida
13	GK	HKG	Wei Zhao

No.	Pos.	Nation	Player
14	MF	HKG	Law Ka Lok
15	DF	BRA	Beto
16	MF	HKG	Lai Yiu Cheong
17	MF	HKG	Lau Fu Kuen
18	MF	HKG	Cheung Yiu Ting
19	GK	HKG	Luk Ping Chung
20	FW	HKG	Chao Pengfei
21	MF	HKG	Cheung Man Lok
22	MF	HKG	Li Haiqiang
23	DF	HKG	Kiang Kwan Yun
24	MF	HKG	Li Chi Shing
27	FW	HKG	Cheung Chi Fung
28	DF	HKG	Wong Chi Chung

Players with dual nationality:

- (China) (Hong Kong) Xie Silida (Local player)
- (China) (Hong Kong) Li Ming (Local player)
- (China) Li Haiqiang (Local player, eligible to play for Hong Kong national football team)
- (China) Chao Pengfei (Local player, eligible to play for Hong Kong national football team)
- (China) Wei Zhao (Local player, eligible to play for Hong Kong national football team)

=== Transfers ===
==== In ====
#	Position	Player	Transferred from	Fee	Date	Team	Source
	MF	(Hong Kong) Lai Yiu Cheong	(Hong Kong) TSW Pegasus	Undisclosed	13 June 2012	First team	
	DF	(Hong Kong) Kwok Wing Sun	(Hong Kong) Wofoo Tai Po	Undisclosed	18 June 2012	First-team	
13	GK	(Hong Kong) Wei Zhao	(Hong Kong) Biu Chun Rangers	Undisclosed	18 June 2012	First-team	
20	FW	(Hong Kong) Chao Pengfei	(Hong Kong) Biu Chun Rangers	Undisclosed	18 June 2012	First team	
22	MF	(Hong Kong) Li Haiqiang	(Hong Kong) South China	Free transfer	1 August 2012	First team	

==== Out ====
#	Position	Player	Transferred to	Fee	Date	Team	Source
7	DF	(Hong Kong) Chan Hin Kwong	Citizen	Free transfer (Released)	8 June 2012	First-team	
10	FW	(Hong Kong) Chu Kwok Leung	Unattached (Released)			First-team	
12	FW	(Hong Kong) (Cameroon) Julius Akosah	Biu Chun Rangers	Free transfer (Released)		First-team	
20	MF	(Hong Kong) Ip Kwok Hei	Tai Chung	Free transfer (Released)		First-team	
23	FW	(Hong Kong) Leung Kwok Wai	Yokohama FC Hong Kong	Free transfer	29 June 2012	First-team	
25	MF	(Serbia) Mirko Teodorović	Yokohama FC Hong Kong	Free transfer	29 June 2012	First-team	
27	MF	(Serbia) Milutin Trnavać	Unattached (Released)			First-team	
32	GK	(Australia) Nenad Vekić	Unattached (Released)			First-team	
33	DF	(Montenegro) Čedomir Mijanović	Yokohama FC Hong Kong	Free transfer	29 June 2012	First-team	
38	FW	(Hong Kong) Yuen Lap Cheung	Yuen Long	Free transfer		First-team	

==== Loan In ====
#	Position	Player	Loaned from	Fee	Date	Team	Source

==== Loan out ====
#	Position	Player	Loaned to	Fee	Date	Team	Source

== Stats ==
=== Squad Stats ===
				Total				Hong Kong First Division League		Senior Challenge Shield		FA Cup		AFC Cup Play-offs		
N	Pos.	Name	Nat.	GS	App	Gls	Min	App	Gls	App	Gls	App	Gls	App	Gls	Notes
1	GK	Siu Leong	(Hong Kong)	4	4	-7	309	4	-7							(−) GA
13	GK	Wei Zhao	(Hong Kong)	20	21	-41	1807	15	-24	2	-7	2	-6	2	-4	(−) GA
19	GK	Luk Ping Chung	(Hong Kong)		1		26	1								(−) GA
2	DF	Kwok Wing Sun	(Hong Kong)	21	22		1896	16		2		2		2		
4	DF	Li Ming	(Hong Kong)	4	7		267	6				1				
5	DF	Cheng Ting Chi	(Hong Kong)	5	11		379	8		1		1		1		
6	DF	Mauricio Correa Da Luz	(Brazil)	17	17	5	1440	13	3	2	2	1		1		
12	DF	Xie Silida	(China)	10	14		879	9		2		1		2		
15	DF	Beto	(Brazil)	23	23	8	2070	17	6	2	1	2	1	2		
23	DF	Kiang Kwan Yun	(Hong Kong)		1		31	1								
28	DF	Wong Chi Chung	(Hong Kong)	13	16		1105	11		2		1		2		
3	MF	Diego Eli Moreira	(Brazil)	23	23	1	2030	17		2		2	1	2		
7	MF	Ling Cong	(Hong Kong)	20	21	3	1788	16	3	1		2		2		
8	MF	Chow Cheuk Fung	(Hong Kong)	7	13		661	11				1		1		
14	MF	Law Ka Lok	(Hong Kong)	8	18		887	14		2		1		1		
16	MF	Lai Yiu Cheong	(Hong Kong)	13	17	2	1158	12	2	1		2		2		
17	MF	Lau Fu Kuen	(Hong Kong)													
18	MF	Cheung Yiu Ting	(Hong Kong)		4		45	3		1						
21	MF	Cheung Man Lok	(Hong Kong)	1	9		162	7		1		1				
22	MF	Li Haiqiang	(Hong Kong)	19	20	1	1699	14	1	2		2		2		
24	MF	Li Chi Shing	(Hong Kong)	1	1		59	1								
9	FW	Daniel Goulart Quevedo	(Brazil)	21	21	10	1815	15	7	2		2	1	2	2	
10	FW	Chan Pak Hei	(Hong Kong)	1	1		59	1								
11	FW	Yip Tsz Chun	(Hong Kong)	19	23	3	1626	17	3	2		2		2		
20	FW	Chao Pengfei	(Hong Kong)	14	20	3	1295	16	3			2		2		
27	FW	Cheung Chi Fung	(Hong Kong)		2	1	33	2	1							

Last updated: 26 May 2013
Ordered by Position
0 shown as blank

=== Top scorers ===
As of 18 May 2013

Place	Position	Nationality	Number	Name	First Division League	Senior Challenge Shield	FA Cup	AFC Cup Play-offs	Total
=1	FW	(Brazil)	9	Daniel Goulart Quevedo	7	0	1	2	10
=1	DF	(Brazil)	15	Beto	6	1	1	0	8
3	DF	(Brazil)	6	Mauricio Correa Da Luz	3	2	0	0	5
=4	MF	(China) (Hong Kong)	7	Ling Cong	3	0	0	0	3
=4	FW	(Hong Kong) (China)	20	Chao Pengfei	3	0	0	0	3
=4	FW	(Hong Kong)	11	Yip Tsz Chun	3	0	0	0	3
7	MF	(Hong Kong)	16	Lai Yiu Cheong	2	0	0	0	2
=8	MF	(Brazil)	3	Diego Eli Moreira	0	0	1	0	1
=8	MF	(Hong Kong)	22	Li Haiqiang	1	0	0	0	1
=8	FW	(Hong Kong)	27	Cheung Chi Fung	1	0	0	0	1
TOTALS					29	3	3	2	37

=== Disciplinary record ===
As of 26 May 2013

Number	Nationality	Position	Name	First Division League		Senior Challenge Shield		FA Cup		AFC Cup play-offs		Total	
Number	Nationality	Position	Name	Yellow card	Red card	Yellow card	Red card	Yellow card	Red card	Yellow card	Red card	Yellow card	Red card
2	(Hong Kong)	DF	Kwok Wing Sun	6	0	0	0	0	1	1	0	7	1
3	(Brazil)	MF	Diego Eli Moreira	6	0	1	0	0	0	1	0	8	0
6	(Brazil)	DF	Mauricio Correa Da Luz	7	0	0	1	0	0	0	0	7	1
7	(China) (Hong Kong)	MF	Ling Cong	3	0	0	0	0	0	0	0	3	0
8	(Hong Kong)	MF	Chow Cheuk Fung	1	0	0	0	0	0	0	0	1	0
9	(Brazil)	FW	Daniel Goulart Quevedo	6	1	0	0	0	0	2	0	8	1
11	(Hong Kong)	FW	Yip Tsz Chun	2	0	0	0	0	0	0	0	2	0
12	(China) (Hong Kong)	DF	Xie Silida	3	0	0	0	0	0	0	0	3	0
14	(Hong Kong)	MF	Law Ka Lok	1	0	2	0	0	0	1	0	4	0
15	(Brazil)	DF	Beto	3	0	1	0	1	0	1	0	6	0
16	(Hong Kong)	MF	Lai Yiu Cheong	1	0	0	0	0	0	1	0	2	0
18	(Hong Kong)	MF	Cheung Yiu Ting	1	0	0	0	0	0	0	0	1	0
22	(Hong Kong) (China)	MF	Li Haiqiang	4	1	1	0	0	0	0	1	5	2
28	(Hong Kong)	DF	Wong Chi Chung	1	1	1	0	0	0	0	0	2	1
TOTALS				45	3	6	1	1	1	7	1	59	6

== Competitions ==
=== Overall ===
Competition	Started round	Final position / round	First match	Last match
Hong Kong First Division League	—	3rd	1 September 2012	5 May 2013
Senior Challenge Shield	Quarter-finals	Quarter-finals	18 November 2012	24 November 2012
FA Cup	Quarter-finals	Quarter-finals	16 February 2013	10 March 2013
Hong Kong AFC Cup play-offs	Semi-finals	Runner-up	18 May 2013	26 May 2013

Updated to match played 26 May 2013
Source: Competitions

=== First Division League ===
==== Classification ====
Pos	Team	Pld	W	D	L	GF	GA	GD	Pts	Qualification or relegation
1	South China (C)	18	11	3	4	46	21	+25	36	2014 AFC Champions League play-off stage
2	Kitchee	18	9	5	4	39	23	+16	32	2014 AFC Cup (Note: Kitchee won the 2012–13 Hong Kong Season play-off and thus qualified for the 2014 AFC Cup Group stage.)
3	Tuen Mun	18	8	4	6	29	31	−2	28	2012–13 Hong Kong Season play-off (Note: Southern qualified for the play-offs as Kitchee defeated Sun Pegasus in the FA Cup while they have guaranteed a place for the play-offs, meaning the league 4th place qualifies.)
4	Southern	18	6	6	6	24	27	−3	24	2012–13 Hong Kong Season play-off
5	Sun Pegasus	18	4	9	5	35	29	+6	21	

Updated to match(es) played on 26 May 2013. Source:
Rules for classification: 1) points; 2) head-to-head points; 3) head-to-head goal difference; 4) head-to-head goals scored; 5) goal difference; 6) number of goals scored.
(C) Champions

==== Results summary ====
Overall								Home						Away					
Pld	W	D	L	GF	GA	GD	Pts	W	D	L	GF	GA	GD	W	D	L	GF	GA	GD
18	8	4	6	29	31	−2	28	5	1	3	15	16	−1	3	3	3	14	15	−1

Last updated: 5 May 2013.

==== Results by round ====
Round	1	2	3	4	5	6	7	8	9	10	11	12	13	14	15	16	17	18
Ground	A	H	H	H	A	H	A	A	H	H	A	H	A	H	H	A	A	A
Result	D	W	L	D	W	W	D	L	W	W	L	L	L	W	L	W	W	D
Position	7	4	7	6	4	3	4	4	3	3	3	3	3	3	3	3	3	3

Updated to match(es) played on 5 May 2013. Source:
A = Away; H = Home; W = Win; D = Draw; L = Loss

== Matches ==
Win Draw Loss Void

=== Pre-season ===
9 August 2012	Sunray Cave JC Sun Hei (Hong Kong)	0 – 2	(Hong Kong) Tuen Mun
18:00 (GMT+8)

=== Competitive ===
==== First Division League ====
1 September 2012 Week 1	Citizen	0 – 0	Tuen Mun	Mong Kok, Kowloon
17:30 (GMT+8)	Sham Kwok Fai (yellow card) 21'; Detinho (yellow card) 63'	Report	(yellow card) 67' Yip Tsz Chun; (yellow card) 86' Mauricio	Stadium: Mong Kok Stadium (Capatity:6,680); Attendance: 1,023; Referee: Liu Kwok Man; Assistant referees: Chan Shui Hung, Ho Wai Sing; Fourth official: Lam Chi Ho

8 September 2012 Week 2	Tuen Mun	3 – 0	Southern	Tuen Mun, New Territories
14:30 (GMT+8)	Daniel 9', 66' (yellow card) 69'; Yip Tsz Chun (yellow card) 46'; Beto 57'; Kwok Wing Sun (yellow card) 74'; Li Haiqiang (yellow card) 85'	Report	(yellow card) 27' (yellow-red card) 49' Chan Ming Kong	Stadium: Tuen Mun Tang Siu Kin Sports Ground (Capatity:2,200); Attendance: 714; Referee: Ng Kai Lam; Assistant referees: Chan Shui Hung, Yu Chun San; Fourth official: Chan Ming Siu

15 September 2012 Week 3	Tuen Mun	2 – 4	Sun Pegasus	Tuen Mun, New Territories
14:30 (GMT+8)	Diego (yellow card) 29'; Daniel 39'; Law Ka Lok (yellow card) 73'; Chao Pengfei 77'	Report	10', 90' McKee; (yellow card) 51' (goal) 79' Sandro; 67' Deng Jinghuang; (yellow card) 74' Mbome	Stadium: Tuen Mun Tang Siu Kin Sports Ground (Capatity:2,200); Attendance: 919; Referee: Liu Kwok Man; Assistant referees: Chow Chun Kit, Yu Chun San; Fourth official: Chan Ming Siu

30 September 2012 Week 4	Tuen Mun	2 – 2	Yokohama FC Hong Kong	Tuen Mun, New Territories
14:30 (GMT+8)	Lai Yiu Cheong 64'; Mauricio 70'; Li Haiqiang (yellow card) 71'; Daniel (yellow card) 90'	Report	(yellow card) 12' Mijanović; 32' Lee Ka Yiu; (yellow card) 37' Lam Ngai Tong; (yellow card) 59' Law Chun Bong; (yellow card) 63' Mirko; 86' (pen.) Yoshitake	Stadium: Tuen Mun Tang Siu Kin Sports Ground (Capatity:2,200); Attendance: 969; Referee: Ng Kai Lam; Assistant referees: Poon Ming Fai, Yu Chun San; Fourth official: Tong Kui Sum

6 October 2012 Week 5	Sunray Cave JC Sun Hei	1 – 2	Tuen Mun	Mong Kok, Kowloon
17:30 (GMT+8)	Mauricio 22' (o.g.); Wong Chun Ho (yellow card) 37'; Li Hang Wui (yellow card) 51'	Report	(yellow card) 30' Chow Cheuk Fung; 32' Beto; 35' (yellow card) 81' Ling Cong	Stadium: Mong Kok Stadium (Capatity:6,680); Attendance: 751; Referee: Liu Kwok Man; Assistant referees: Chow Chun Kit, Poon Ming Fai; Fourth official: Ho Wai Sing

20 October 2012 Week 6	Tuen Mun	1 – 0	Biu Chun Rangers	Tuen Mun, New Territories
14:30 (GMT+8)	Mauricio (yellow card) 8'; Li Haiqiang (yellow card) 18'; Daniel 46'; Kwok Wing Sun (yellow card) 84'; Ling Cong (yellow card) 87'	Report	(yellow card) 9' Liu Songwei; (yellow card) 84' Akosah; (yellow card) 90+2' Yeung Chi Lun	Stadium: Tuen Mun Tang Siu Kin Sports Ground (Capatity:2,200); Attendance: 619; Referee: Ng Kai Lam; Assistant referees: Chan Shui Hung, Chow Chun Kit; Fourth official: Sarao, Amarjit Singh

27 October 2012 Week 8	Kitchee	1 – 1	Tuen Mun	Tseung Kwan O, New Territories
14:30 (GMT+8)	Spitz (yellow card) 10'; Jordi 24'; Lo Kwan Yee (yellow card) 90'	Report	(yellow card) 39' Kwok Wing Sun; 78' Yip Tsz Chun; (yellow card) 86' Daniel; (yellow card) 88' Mauricio; (yellow card) 90' Cheung Yiu Ting	Stadium: Tseung Kwan O Sports Ground (Capatity:3,500); Attendance: 849; Referee: Cheng Oi Cho; Assistant referees: Liu Kwok Man, Poon Ming Fai; Fourth official: Lam Shing Yan, Franky

11 November 2012 Week 7	South China	2 – 1	Tuen Mun	So Kon Po, Hong Kong Island
14:30 (GMT+8)	Luk Chi Ho 34'; Ticão (yellow card) 43' (yellow-red card) 90'; Itaparica 62'; Mauro (yellow card) 81'; Lee Hong Lim (yellow card) 90'	Report	(yellow card) 16' Daniel; (yellow card) 44' Kwok Wing Sun; 45' (yellow card) 78' Mauricio; (yellow card) 83' Diego	Stadium: Hong Kong Stadium (Capatity:40,000); Attendance: 1,977; Referee: Tong Kui Sum; Assistant referees: Poon Ming Fai, Yu Chun San; Fourth official: Sarao, Amarjit Singh

23 December 2012 Week 9	Tuen Mun	1 – 0	Wofoo Tai Po	Tuen Mun, New Territories
14:30 (GMT+8)	Xie Silida (yellow card) 25'; Beto 32'; Lai Yiu Cheong (yellow card) 65'; Wong Chi Chung (yellow card) 72' (yellow-red card) 82'; Kwok Wing Sun (yellow card) 84'	Report	(yellow card) 6' Chen Liming; (red card) 30' Li Hon Ho	Stadium: Tuen Mun Tang Siu Kin Sports Ground (Capatity:2,200); Attendance: 638; Referee: Ng Kai Lam; Assistant referees: Chow Chun Kit, Luk Kin Sun; Fourth official: Ho Wai Sing

19 January 2013 Week 10	Tuen Mun	4 – 2	Sunray Cave JC Sun Hei	Tuen Mun, New Territories
14:30 (GMT+8)	Beto 30' (pen.), 33'; Xie Silida (yellow card) 60'; Daniel 73' (yellow card) 83'; Li Haiqiang (yellow card) 75'; Chao Pengfei 84'; Mauricio (yellow card) 90'	Report	(yellow card) 28' Zhang Chunhui; (yellow card) 32' Pak Wing Chak; 49', 88' Diaz; (yellow card) 84' Leung Ka Hai	Stadium: Tuen Mun Tang Siu Kin Sports Ground (Capatity:2,200); Attendance: 665; Referee: Ho Wai Sing; Assistant referees: Chow Chun Kit, Yu Chun San; Fourth official: Luk Kin Sun

3 February 2013 Week 11	Wofoo Tai Po	3 – 1	Tuen Mun	Tai Po, New Territories
14:30 (GMT+8)	Diego 8' (o.g.); Chen Liming 11'; Annan 83'	Report	(yellow card) 28' Beto; 90+4' Ling Cong	Stadium: Tai Po Sports Ground (Capatity:3,000); Attendance: 766; Referee: Tong Kui Sum; Assistant referees: Cheng Oi Cho, Poon Ming Fai; Fourth official: Fok Pong Shing

24 February 2013 Week 12	Tuen Mun	0 – 2	Kitchee	Tuen Mun, New Territories
14:30 (GMT+8)	Diego (yellow card) 90+3'	Report	(yellow card) 15' Tsang Kam To; 36' Gao Wen; (yellow card) 66' Ngan Lok Fung; 90+4' Lo Chi Kwan	Stadium: Tuen Mun Tang Siu Kin Sports Ground (Capatity:2,200); Attendance: 943; Referee: Ho Wai Sing; Assistant referees: Chan Shui Hung, Poon Ming Fai; Fourth official: Yu Kin Fung

1 March 2013 Week 13	Sun Pegasus	4 – 0	Tuen Mun	Yuen Long, New Territories
20:00 (GMT+8)	McKee 6', 29'; Lo Chun Kit 8'; Karalić 36'; Lee Wai Lun (yellow card) 90'	Report		Stadium: Yuen Long Stadium (Capatity:4,932); Attendance: 597; Referee: Cheng Oi Cho; Assistant referees: Poon Ming Fai, Yu Chun San; Fourth official: Tong Kui Sum

16 March 2013 Week 14	Tuen Mun	2 – 1	South China	Tuen Mun, New Territories
14:30 (GMT+8)	Ling Cong (yellow card) 16'; Beto (yellow card) 18'; Li Haiqiang (yellow card) 36' (yellow-red card) 80'; Daniel (yellow card) 61' (goal) 73' (red card) 83'; Yip Tsz Chun 63'; Diego (yellow card) 90+5'	Report	90+3' Luk Chi Ho	Stadium: Tuen Mun Tang Siu Kin Sports Ground (Capatity:2,200); Attendance: 1,311; Referee: Ng Kai Lam; Assistant referees: Chung Ming Sang, Lam Nai Kei; Fourth official: Cheng Oi Cho

29 March 2013 Week 15	Tuen Mun	0 – 5	Citizen	Tuen Mun, New Territories
14:30 (GMT+8)	Mauricio (yellow card) 24'; Xie Silida (yellow card) 44'; Kwok Wing Sun (yellow card) 62'	Report	(yellow card) 16' Gustavo; 25' (pen.) Festus; (yellow card) 40' Chan Hin Kwong; 48', 63', 69' (yellow card) 61' Nakamura; 75' Sham Kwok Fai	Stadium: Tuen Mun Tang Siu Kin Sports Ground (Capatity:2,200); Attendance: 775; Referee: Cheng Oi Cho; Assistant referees: Yu Chun San, Yu Kin Fung; Fourth official: Ho Wai Sing

13 April 2013 Week 16	Yokohama FC Hong Kong	2 – 4	Tuen Mun	Siu Sai Wan, Hong Kong Island
17:30 (GMT+8)	Fukuda 52' (pen.); Fong Pak Lun (yellow card) 62' (goal) 81'; Leung Kwok Wai (yellow card) 73'	Report	2' Mauricio; 35' Ling Cong; 43' Chao Pengfei; (yellow card) 51' Diego; 74' (pen.) Beto	Stadium: Siu Sai Wan Sports Ground (Capatity:12,000); Attendance: 432; Referee: Cheng Oi Cho; Assistant referees: Chan Shui Hung, Tang Hing Fu; Fourth official: Lau Fong Hei

21 April 2013 Week 17	Biu Chun Rangers	1 – 4	Tuen Mun	Sham Shui Po, Kowloon
14:30 (GMT+8)	Akosah 8' (yellow card) 40'; Liu Songwei (yellow card) 33'; Sashi (yellow card) 75'	Report	17' Daniel; 35' Yip Tsz Chun; 38' Li Haiqiang; (yellow card) 45+1' Mauricio; (yellow card) 45+3' Wong Chi Chung; 57' Lai Yiu Cheong; (yellow card) 88' Beto	Stadium: Sham Shui Po Sports Ground (Capatity:2,194); Attendance: 502; Referee: Chan Shui Hung; Assistant referees: Poon Ming Fai, Yau Tsz Yeung; Fourth official: Ho Wai Sing

4 May 2013 Week 18	Southern	1 – 1	Tuen Mun	Aberdeen, Hong Kong Island
14:30 (GMT+8)	Dieguito 35' (yellow card) 43'; Ng Siu Fai (yellow card) 82'	Report	(yellow card) 52' Diego; 89' Cheung Chi Fung	Stadium: Aberdeen Sports Ground (Capatity:4,000^{1}); Attendance: 490; Referee: Cheng Oi Cho; Assistant referees: Chan Shui Hung, Lau Fong Hei; Fourth official: Tang Hing Fu

Remarks:
^{1} The capacity of Aberdeen Sports Ground is originally 9,000, but only the 4,000-seated main stand is opened for football match.

==== Senior Challenge Shield ====
===== Quarterfinals =====
18 November 2012 1st leg	Tuen Mun	3 – 2	Wofoo Tai Po	Tuen Mun, New Territories
17:30(GMT+8)	Mauricio 5', 48'; Law Ka Lok (yellow card) 45'; Beto 84' (pen.)	Report	65' (yellow card) 72' Annan; 90' Clayton	Stadium: Tuen Mun Tang Shiu Kin Sports Ground (Capacity: 2,200); Attendance: 661; Referee: Tong Kui Sum; Assistant referees: Chow Chun Kit, Lam Shing Yan; Fourth official: Chan Ming Siu

24 November 2012 2nd leg	Wofoo Tai Po	5 – 0 (7 – 2 agg.)	Tuen Mun	Tsing Yi, New Territories
14:30(GMT+8)	Alex 71', 82', 90'; To Hon To 79'; Ye Jia 89'	Report	(yellow card) 40' (yellow-red card) 53' Mauricio; (yellow card) 55' Beto; (yellow card) 72' Wong Chi Chung; (yellow card) 81' Diego; (yellow card) 84' Law Ka Lok; (yellow card) 90+2' Li Haiqiang	Stadium: Tsing Yi Sports Ground (Capacity: 1,500); Attendance: 483; Referee: Cheng Oi Cho; Assistant referees: Chow Chun Kit, Poon Ming Fai; Fourth official: Sarao Amarjit Singh

==== FA Cup ====
===== Quarter-finals =====
16 February 2013 1st leg	Tuen Mun	2 – 3	Sun Pegasus	Tuen Mun, New Territories
14:30(GMT+8)	Kwok Wing Sun (yellow card) 14' (yellow-red card) 42'; Daniel 24'; Diego 88'	Report	10' McKee; 15' (yellow card) 25' Miović; (yellow card) 20' (yellow-red card) 59' Cesar; 90+7' Lee Wai Lun	Stadium: Tuen Mun Tang Shiu Kin Sports Ground (Capacity: 2,200); Attendance: 722; Referee: Ng Kai Lam; Assistant referees: Ho Wai Sing, Yu Chun San; Fourth official: Lam Nai Kei

10 March 2013 2nd leg	Sun Pegasus	3 – 1 (6 – 3 agg.)	Tuen Mun	Yuen Long, New Territories
17:30(GMT+8)	Ju Yingzhi 38'; McKee 73'; Karalić 82'	Report	52' (yellow card) 69' Beto	Stadium: Yuen Long Stadium (Capacity: 4,932); Attendance: 536; Referee: Ng Chiu Kok; Assistant referees: Lui Siu Chuen, Yu Chun San; Fourth official: Luk Kin Sun

==== Hong Kong AFC Cup play-offs ====
18 May 2013 Semi-finals	Tuen Mun	2 – 1	Wofoo Tai Po	Mong Kok, Kowloon
16:00 (GMT+8)	Daniel 6', 89' (yellow card) 89'; Lai Yiu Cheong (yellow card) 41'	Report	(yellow card) 38' Li Shu Yeung; 42' (pen.) Aender; (yellow card) 45+3' Ye Jia	Stadium: Mong Kok Stadium (Capatity:6,680); Attendance: 1,250; Referee: Tong Kui Sum; Assistant referees: Cheng Oi Cho, Chan Shui Hung; Fourth official: Lau Fong Hei

26 May 2013 Final	Kitchee	3 – 0	Tuen Mun	Mong Kok, Kowloon
16:00 (GMT+8)	Chu Siu Kei (yellow card) 20'; Recio (yellow card) 27'; Jordi 59'; Huang Yang 67'; Chan Man Fai 79'; Couñago (red card) 84'; Yago (yellow card) 85'; Rehman (yellow card) 89'	Report	(yellow card) 18' Kwok Wing Sun; (yellow card) 37' Diego; (yellow card) 65' Daniel; (yellow card) 84' Law Ka Lok; (yellow card) 86' Beto; (red card) 90' Li Haiqiang	Stadium: Mong Kok Stadium (Capatity:6,680); Attendance: 1,576; Referee: Ng Chiu Kok; Assistant referees: Chung Ming Sang, Lam Nai Kei; Fourth official: Cheng Oi Cho
