= Xie Silida =

Hong Kong footballer (born 1990)

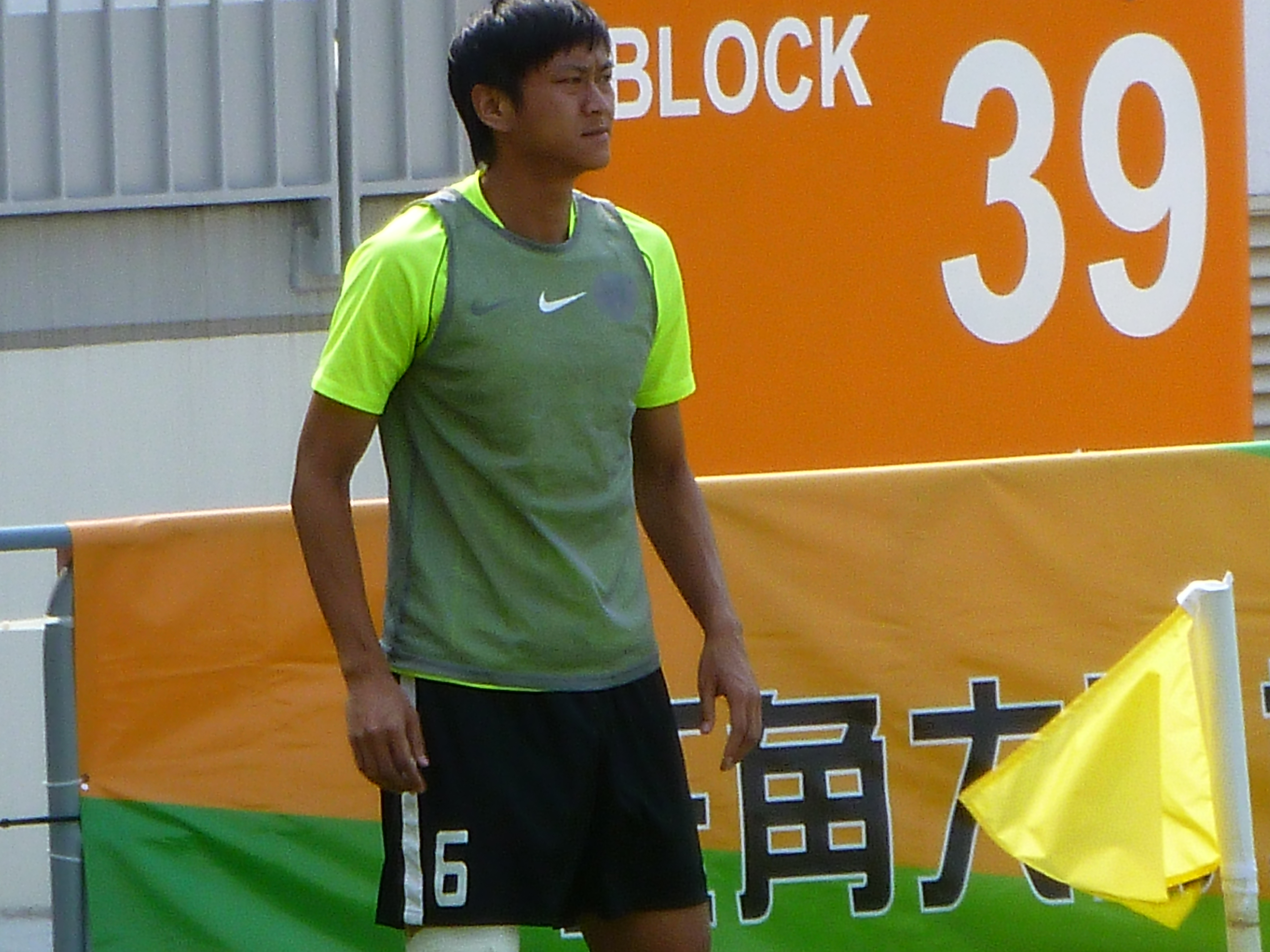

Personal information
- Full name: Xie Silida
- Date of birth: 19 June 1990 (age 36)
- Place of birth: Kunming, Yunnan, China
- Height: 1.90 m (6 ft 3 in)
- Positions: Center back; defensive midfielder

Youth career
- 2002–2006: Yunnan Hongta
- 2006–2008: Beijing Guoan

Senior career*
Years	Team	Apps	(Gls)
2008–2010	Beijing Guoan	0	(0)
2010–2014	Tuen Mun	35	(1)
2012	→ HK Sapling (loan)	10	(0)
2014–2015	Hong Kong Rangers	3	(0)
2015	Tai Po	2	(0)
2015–2017	Kwai Tsing	26	(3)
- * Club domestic league appearances and goals as of 8 October 2017 ‡ National team caps and goals as of 8 May 2021

Xie Silida (Chinese: 謝思利達 ; born 19 June 1990) is a Chinese-born Hong Kong former professional footballer who played as a center back or a defensive midfielder.

== Club career ==
=== Beijing Guoan ===
Xie joined Beijing Guoan youth academy after he left Yunnan Hongta, his hometown-based club. However, in 2010, he was informed that the club would not sign a professional contract with him.

=== Tuen Mun ===
In the beginning of the 2010–11 season, Xie joined the newly promoted Hong Kong First Division side Tuen Mun, as a Chinese expatriate footballer.

He made his debut for Tuen Mun in a home league match against Tai Po at Tuen Mun Tang Shiu Kin Sports Ground on 25 September 2010, which the team was defeated 2–1. Xie was the 68-minute substitute for Yuen Lap Cheung in the match. However, since Xie was counted as a foreign player while at the same 4 other foreign teammates were still in the team, according to the rules in that season, only 4 foreign players could be in playing for a team at the same time. As a result, Tuen Mun was penalize for a 0–3 defeat. Xie started for the first time and eventually scored his first goal for Tuen Mun on 24 October 2010, an away league match against TSW Pegasus at Yuen Long Stadium. However, the goal was not enough to win the match, as they lost 1–2.

=== On loan Hong Kong Sapling ===
In February 2012, Xie was loaned to another First Division side Hong Kong Sapling until the end of the season.

=== Back to Tuen Mun ===
He made his debut of the season on 20 October 2012, in a home league match against Biu Chun Rangers at Tuen Mun Tang Shiu Kin Sports Ground, as a 90-minute substitute for Yip Tsz Chun.

== Career statistics ==
=== Club ===
As of 23 December 2012

Club performance			League		Cup				League Cup		Continental		Total	
Season	Club	League	Apps	Goals	Apps	Goals	Apps	Goals	Apps	Goals	Apps	Goals	Apps	Goals
Hong Kong			League		Senior Shield		FA Cup		League Cup		AFC Cup		Total	
2010–11	Tuen Mun	First Division	12	1	1	0	1	0	1	0	N/A	N/A	15	1
2011–12	Tuen Mun	First Division	1	0	1	0	0	0	0	0	N/A	N/A	2	0
2011–12	Hong Kong Sapling	First Division	8	0	0	0	1	0	1	0	N/A	N/A	10	0
Hong Kong Sapling Total			8	0	0	0	1	0	1	0	0	0	10	0
2012–13	Tuen Mun	First Division	4	0	2	0	0	0	0	0	N/A	N/A	6	0
Tuen Mun Total			17	1	4	0	1	0	1	0	0	0	23	1
Hong Kong Total			25	1	4	0	2	0	2	0	0	0	33	1
Career Total			25	1	4	0	2	0	2	0	0	0	33	1
