= 2012–13 Hong Kong First Division League =

Red MR First Division League
- Season: 2012–13
- Champions: South China
- Relegated: Tai Po
- AFC Cup: South China; Kitchee (via play-off)
- Matches: 90
- Goals: 321 (3.57 per match)
- Top goalscorer: Jaimes McKee (16 goals)
- Biggest home win: Citizen 7–3 Wofoo Tai Po
- Biggest away win: Biu Chun Rangers 2–8 Sun Pegasus
- Highest scoring: Citizen 7–3 Wofoo Tai Po; Biu Chun Rangers 2–8 Sun Pegasus
- Longest winning run: 5 games South China
- Longest unbeaten run: 13 games South China
- Longest winless run: 10 games Sunray Cave JC Sun Hei
- Longest losing run: 4 games Citizen; Wofoo Tai Po
- Highest attendance: 4,249; South China 1–0 Kitchee; Hong Kong Stadium (Week 4)
- Lowest attendance: 227; Yokohama FC HK 1–1 Citizen; Siu Sai Wan Sports Ground (Week 17)
- Total attendance: 89,927
- Average attendance: 999

The 2012–13 Hong Kong First Division League, also known as 2012–13 Red MR Hong Kong First Division League for sponsorship reasons, was the 101st since its establishment.

Kitchee were the defending champions, won their 5th Hong Kong title in the previous season. The season featured 8 teams from the 2011–12 Hong Kong First Division League and two new teams promoted from 2011–12 Hong Kong Second Division League: Kam Fung, which then renamed as Biu Chun Rangers, and Southern District who replace relegated Sham Shui Po and Hong Kong Sapling.

== Teams ==
A total of 10 teams contested the league, including eight sides from the 2011–12 season and two promoted from the 2011–12 Hong Kong Second Division League.

Locations of the Hong Kong First Division League 2012–13 teams

=== Stadia and locations ===
Note: Table lists in alphabetical order.

Team	Stadium	Location	Capacity
Biu Chun Rangers^{1}	Sham Shui Po Sports Ground	Sham Shui Po	2,194
Citizen	Mong Kok Stadium	Mong Kok	6,680
Kitchee	Tseung Kwan O Sports Ground	Tseung Kwan O	3,500^{2}
South China	Hong Kong Stadium	So Kon Po	40,000
Southern	Aberdeen Sports Ground^{3}	Aberdeen	4,000^{4}
Sunray Cave JC Sun Hei	Mong Kok Stadium	Mong Kok	6,680
Sun Pegasus^{5}	Yuen Long Stadium	Yuen Long	4,932
Tuen Mun	Tuen Mun Tang Shiu Kin Sports Ground	Tuen Mun	2,200
Wofoo Tai Po	Tai Po Sports Ground	Tai Po	3,000
Yokohama FC Hong Kong^{6}	Siu Sai Wan Sports Ground	Siu Sai Wan	12,000

^{1} Renamed Biu Chun Rangers, previously known as Kam Fung.
^{2} The capacity of Tseung Kwan O Sports Ground can be increased to 5,000 if the temporary stand is opened.
^{3} After successfully gaining the right to play in the 2012–13 Hong Kong First Division League on 8 April 2012, Southern plan to continue using Aberdeen Sports Ground as their home ground in the First Division League.
^{4} The capacity of Aberdeen Sports Ground is originally 9,000, but only the 4,000-seated main stand is opened for football match.
^{5} Renamed as Sun Pegasus, previously known as TSW Pegasus.
^{6} Renamed as Yokohama FC Hong Kong, previously known as Biu Chun Rangers.

=== Personnel and kits ===
Team	Chairman	Head coach	Captain	Kitmaker	Shirt sponsor
Biu Chun Rangers	(Hong Kong) Mok Yiu Keung	(Hong Kong) Chan Hung Ping	(Hong Kong) Wong Chin Hung	Xtep	odm
Citizen	(Hong Kong) Pui Kwan Kay	(Hong Kong) Chu Kwok Kuen	(Nigeria) Festus Baise	Jako	Rasonic
Kitchee	(Hong Kong) Ken Ng	(Spain) Josep Gombau	(Hong Kong) Chu Siu Kei	Nike	Canon
South China	(Macau) Steven Lo	(Hong Kong) Liu Chun Fai	(Hong Kong) Lee Chi Ho	Adidas	Panasonic Corporation
Southern	(Hong Kong) Wong Ling Sun	(Hong Kong) Fung Hoi Man	(Ghana) Wisdom Fofo Agbo	Nike	Motion Media
Sunray Cave JC Sun Hei	(Hong Kong) Chow Man Leung	(Hong Kong) Chan Fat Chi	(Brazil) Roberto Orlando	Adidas	Sunray Cave
Sun Pegasus	(Hong Kong) Cheng Ting Kong	(Hong Kong) Chan Chi Hong	(Hong Kong) Jaimes McKee	Adidas	PlayStation
Tuen Mun	(Hong Kong) Lau Wong Fat	(Hong Kong) Yan Lik Kin	(Hong Kong) Li Haiqiang	Adidas	Hong Kong Motor Inspection
Wofoo Tai Po	(Hong Kong) Cheung Hok Ming	(Hong Kong) Cheung Po Chun	(Hong Kong) Chan Yuk Chi	Adidas	Lee & Man Paper
Yokohama FC Hong Kong	(Japan) Hiroshi Onodera	(Hong Kong) Lee Chi Kin	(Japan) Tsuyoshi Yoshitake	Nike	LEOC

=== Managerial changes ===
Team	Outgoing manager	Manner of departure	Date of vacancy	Position in table	Incoming manager	Date of appointment
South China	(Slovakia) Ján Kocian	Sacked	19 May 2012	Pre-season	(Hong Kong) Liu Chun Fai	9 July 2012
Sunray Cave JC Sun Hei	(Brazil) José Ricardo Rambo	End of Contract	23 May 2012	Pre-season	(Hong Kong) Tim Bredbury	1 June 2012
Yokohama FC HK	(Hong Kong) Tim Bredbury	Signed by Sunray Cave JC Sun Hei	1 June 2012	Pre-season	(Hong Kong) Lee Chi Kin	
Sun Pegasus	(Hong Kong) Chan Hiu Ming	Sacked	14 June 2012	Pre-season	(Hong Kong) Chan Ho Yin	10 July 2012
Rangers	(Hong Kong) Chan Chi Kwong			Pre-season	(Croatia) Goran Paulić	
Sun Pegasus	(Hong Kong) Chan Ho Yin	Sacked	9 October 2012	6th	(Hong Kong) Chan Chi Hong	
Sunray Cave JC Sun Hei	(Hong Kong) Tim Bredbury	Contract terminated	23 October 2012	9th	(Hong Kong) Chiu Chung Man	

=== Foreign players ===
The number of foreign players was restricted to six per team.

Club	Visa 1	Visa 2	Visa 3	Visa 4	Visa 5	Visa 6
Hong Kong Rangers	(Brazil) Giovane Silva	(Croatia) Miroslav Saric	(Zambia) Sashi Chalwe	(Brazil) Juninho	(Brazil) Luciano Silva	
Citizen	(Brazil) Detinho	(Brazil) Hélio	(Brazil) Paulinho	(Brazil) Gustavo Silva	(Brazil) Sandro	(Japan) Yuto Nakamura
Kitchee	(Spain) Dani Cancela	(Spain) Pablo Couñago	(Spain) Yago González	(Spain) Fernando Recio	(Spain) Jordi Tarrés	(Pakistan) Zesh Rehman
South China	(Brazil) Alessandro Celin	(Brazil) Dhiego Martins	(Brazil) Joel Bertoti Padilha	(Brazil) Itaparica	(Brazil) Ticão	(Chinese Taipei) Victor Chou
Southern	(Cameroon) Paul Ngue	(Spain) Jonathan Carril	(Spain) Rubén López	(Spain) Lander Panera	(Spain) Dieguito	
Sunray Cave JC Sun Hei	(Brazil) Roberto Júnior	(Cameroon) Jean-Jacques Kilama	(Guinea) Mamadou Barry	(Spain) José María	(Cameroon) Yrel Bouet	(China) Su Yang
Sun Pegasus	(Bosnia and Herzegovina) Vladimir Karalić	(Brazil) Paulo Cesar	(Cameroon) Eugene Mbome	(Serbia) Igor Miović	(Croatia) Josip Škorić	(South Korea) Kim Dong-Ryeol
Tuen Mun	(Brazil) Beto	(Brazil) Daniel	(Brazil) Diego Eli	(Brazil) Mauricio		
Wofoo Tai Po	(Brazil) Clayton	(Brazil) Naves Aender	(Nigeria) Alex Akande	(Nigeria) Caleb Ekwegwo		
Yokohama FC Hong Kong	(Japan) Tsuyoshi Yoshitake	(Japan) Taiki Murai	(Montenegro) Čedomir Mijanović	(Serbia) Mirko Teodorović	N/A	(Japan) Kenji Fukuda

== League table ==
Pos	Team	Pld	W	D	L	GF	GA	GD	Pts	Qualification or relegation
1	South China (C)	18	11	3	4	46	21	+25	36	2014 AFC Champions League play-off stage
2	Kitchee	18	9	5	4	39	23	+16	32	2014 AFC Cup (Note: Kitchee won the 2012–13 Hong Kong Season play-off and thus qualified for the 2014 AFC Cup Group stage.)
3	Tuen Mun	18	8	4	6	29	31	−2	28	2012–13 Hong Kong Season play-off (Note: Southern qualified for the play-offs as Kitchee defeated Sun Pegasus in the FA Cup while they have guaranteed a place for the play-offs, meaning the league 4th place qualifies.)
4	Southern	18	6	6	6	24	27	−3	24	2012–13 Hong Kong Season play-off
5	Sun Pegasus	18	4	9	5	35	29	+6	21	
6	Hong Kong Rangers	18	5	5	8	32	52	−20	20 (Note: HKR 3–3 CIT, HKR 2–2 SUN, HKR 1–1 YHK; CIT 2–3 HKR, CIT 1–2 SUN, CIT 3–0 YHK; SUN 2–2 HKR, SUN 1–1 CIT, SUN 1–1 YHK; YHK 2–4 HKR, YHK 1–1 CIT, YHK 2–0 SUN)	
7	Sunray Cave JC Sun Hei	18	4	8	6	26	33	−7	20	
8	Citizen	18	5	5	8	31	27	+4	20	
9	Yokohama FC Hong Kong	18	4	8	6	25	34	−9	20	
10	Wofoo Tai Po (Note: Wofoo Tai Po won the 2012–13 Hong Kong Senior Challenge Shield and thus qualified for the 2012–13 Hong Kong Season play-off along with Southern District whom qualified due to Kitchee winning the FA Cup along with coming runners up in the league.) (R)	18	4	7	7	34	44	−10	19	2012–13 Hong Kong Season play-off and relegation to the 2013–14 Hong Kong Second Division League

Updated to match(es) played on 26 May 2013. Source:
Rules for classification: 1) points; 2) head-to-head points; 3) head-to-head goal difference; 4) head-to-head goals scored; 5) goal difference; 6) number of goals scored.
(C) Champions; (R) Relegated

=== Positions by round ===
As there is a special fixture arrangement for rounds 7 and 8, in order to preserve chronological evolvements, any postponed matches are not included to the round at which they were originally scheduled, but added to the full round they were played immediately afterwards. For example, if a match is scheduled for round 7, but then played between rounds 8 and 9, it will be added to the standings for round 8.

Team ╲ Round	1	2	3	4	5	6	7	8	9	10	11	12	13	14	15	16	17	18
South China	1	3	2	1	1	2	2	1	1	1	1	1	1	1	1	1	1	1
Kitchee	2	1	1	2	2	1	1	2	2	2	2	2	2	2	2	2	2	2
Tuen Mun	7	4	7	6	4	3	4	4	3	3	3	3	3	3	3	3	3	3
Southern	8	10	10	10	10	10	9	7	7	7	5	5	6	5	4	4	4	4
Sun Pegasus	5	7	6	7	6	7	5	8	8	8	8	9	5	7	7	8	7	5
Hong Kong Rangers	3	2	4	4	3	4	3	3	4	4	4	4	4	4	5	5	5	6
Sunray Cave JC Sun Hei	10	9	9	9	9	9	10	10	10	10	10	10	10	9	10	10	9	7
Citizen	6	8	8	8	8	5	6	5	5	5	6	7	9	10	8	9	10	8
Yokohama FC Hong Kong	9	5	3	3	5	6	7	6	6	6	7	6	7	6	6	6	6	9
Wofoo Tai Po	4	6	5	5	7	8	8	9	9	9	9	8	8	8	9	7	8	10

2014 AFC Cup group stage
2012–13 Hong Kong Season play-offs
Relegation to 2013–14 Hong Kong Second Division League

Updated to match(es) played on 4 May 2013. Source: hkfa.com

== Results table ==
Home \ Away	HKR	CIT	KIT	SCA	SOU	SUN	SPS	TMN	TPO	YHK
Hong Kong Rangers		3–3	2–7	1–3	3–1	2–2	2–8	1–4	1–4	1–1
Citizen	2–3		1–0	0–1	0–1	1–2	2–1	0–0	7–3	3–0
Kitchee	1–2	3–2		1–4	3–0	1–1	4–2	1–1	2–2	2–2
South China	6–1	2–1	1–0		0–0	3–4	1–1	2–1	5–1	5–2
Southern	3–1	3–1	0–1	3–2		2–1	3–3	1–1	2–2	1–0
Sunray Cave JC Sun Hei	2–2	1–1	0–3	2–2	3–2		0–0	1–2	3–2	1–1
Sun Pegasus	1–2	0–0	1–1	0–3	1–1	2–0		4–0	3–3	1–2
Tuen Mun	1–0	0–5	0–2	2–1	3–0	4–2	2–4		1–0	2–2
Wofoo Tai Po	1–1	3–1	1–3	0–5	2–1	1–1	2–2	3–1		2–3
Yokohama FC Hong Kong	2–4	1–1	1–4	1–0	0–0	2–0	1–1	2–4	2–2	

Updated to match(es) played on 5 May 2013. Source: Fixtures - RedMR First Division League
Legend: Blue = home team win; Yellow = draw; Red = away team win.

== Fixtures and results ==
=== Round 1 ===
31 August 2012	Sun Pegasus	3 – 3	Wofoo Tai Po	Yuen Long, New Territories
20:00 (GMT+8)	Ng Wai Chiu 1'; Mckee 17', 51'; Lee Wai Lun (yellow card) 18'; Jone (yellow card) 42'; Ng Wai Chiu (yellow card) 45'	Report	19' (yellow card) 41' To Hon To; 53' Lui Chi Hing; 84' Christian Annan; (yellow card) 90' Aender	Stadium: Yuen Long Stadium (Capatity:4,932); Attendance: 1,332; Referee: Ng Kai Lam; Assistant referees: Lam Chi Ho, Chung Ming Sang; Fourth official: Yu Chun San

1 September 2012	Biu Chun Rangers	3 – 1	Southern	Sham Shui Po, Kowloon
14:30 (GMT+8)	Komar 22'; Chak Ting Fung (yellow card) 38'; Giovane 44' (pen.); Saric 90+4'	Report	1' Dieguito; (yellow card) 44' Tsang Chiu Tat	Stadium: Sham Shui Po Sports Ground (Capatity:2,194); Attendance: 595; Referee: Wong Chi Tang, Charlton; Assistant referees: Poon Ming Fai, Lam Shing Yan; Fourth official: Ng Kai Lam

1 September 2012	Citizen	0 – 0	Tuen Mun	Mong Kok, Kowloon
17:30 (GMT+8)	Sham Kwok Fai (yellow card) 21'; Detinho (yellow card) 63'	Report	(yellow card) 67' Yip Tsz Chun; (yellow card) 86' Mauricio	Stadium: Mong Kok Stadium (Capatity:6,680); Attendance: 1,023; Referee: Liu Kwok Man; Assistant referees: Chan Shui Hung, Ho Wai Sing; Fourth official: Lam Chi Ho

2 September 2012	South China	5 – 2	Yokohama FC Hong Kong	So Kon Po, Hong Kong Island
14:30 (GMT+8)	Dhiego 7'; Itaparica 17' (pen.), 62'; Ticão 32'; Lee Hong Lim 80'; Tse (yellow card) 85'	Report	4' Yoshitake; (yellow card) 16' Leung Kwun Chung; (yellow card) 61' Law Chun Bong; 90' Lee Ka Ho	Stadium: Hong Kong Stadium (Capatity:40,000); Attendance: 3,175; Referee: Tong Kui Sum; Assistant referees: Cheng Oi Cho, Lam Nai Kei; Fourth official: Amarjit Singh Sarao

2 September 2012	Sunray Cave JC Sun Hei	0 – 3	Kitchee	Mong Kok, Kowloon
17:30 (GMT+8)	Makhosonke (yellow card) 22'; Roberto (yellow card) 71'	Report	51', 88' Carril; 79' Chan Man Fai	Stadium: Mong Kok Stadium (Capatity:6,680); Attendance: 1,818; Referee: Ng Chiu Kok; Assistant referees: Chow Chun Kit, Chung Ming Sang; Fourth official: Ho Wai Sing

=== Round 2 ===
6 September 2012	Kitchee	3 – 2	Citizen	Tseung Kwan O, New Territories
20:00 (GMT+8)	Cheng Siu Wai 59'; Lo Kwan Yee 66'; Lo Chi Kwan (yellow card) 85'; Carril 90' (pen.)	Report	4', 83' Nakamura; (yellow card) 52' Campion; (yellow card) 88' So Loi Keung; (yellow card) 90' Chiu Chun Kit; (yellow card) 90' Hélio	Stadium: Tseung Kwan O Sports Ground (Capatity:3,500); Attendance: 733; Referee: Wong Chi Tang, Charlton; Assistant referees: Liu Kwok Man, Chung Ming Sang; Fourth official: Lam Shing Yan, Franky

8 September 2012	Tuen Mun	3 – 0	Southern	Tuen Mun, New Territories
14:30 (GMT+8)	Daniel 9', 66' (yellow card) 69'; Yip Tsz Chun (yellow card) 46'; Beto 57'; Kwok Wing Sun (yellow card) 74'; Li Haiqiang (yellow card) 85'	Report	(yellow card) 27' (yellow-red card) 49' Chan Ming Kong	Stadium: Tuen Mun Tang Siu Kin Sports Ground (Capatity:2,200); Attendance: 714; Referee: Ng Kai Lam; Assistant referees: Chan Shui Hung, Yu Chun San; Fourth official: Chan Ming Siu

8 September 2012	Sun Pegasus	1 – 2	Biu Chun Rangers	Yuen Long, New Territories
17:30 (GMT+8)	McKee 45+1'; Deng Jinghuang (yellow card) 50'	Report	21', 30' Saric	Stadium: Yuen Long Stadium (Capatity:4,932); Attendance: 549; Referee: Tong Kui Sum; Assistant referees: Ho Wai Sing, Lam Nai Kei; Fourth official: Cheng Oi Cho

9 September 2012	Wofoo Tai Po	2 – 3	Yokohama FC Hong Kong	Tai Po, New Territories
14:30 (GMT+8)	Li Shu Yeung (yellow card) 8' (yellow-red card) 57'; Alex 34' (yellow card) 35'; Che Run Qiu (yellow card) 54'; Aender 60' (pen.)	Report	13' (yellow card) 44' Leung Kwun Chung; 33' (pen.) Yoshitake; (yellow card) 62' Tsang Man Fai; 81' Lee Ka Yiu; (yellow card) 82' Wong Wai	Stadium: Tai Po Sports Ground (Capatity:3,000); Attendance: 814; Referee: Ng Chiu Kok; Assistant referees: Chow Chun Kit, Lam Shing Yan, Franky; Fourth official: Yau Ho Fai, Leo

9 September 2012	Sunray Cave JC Sun Hei	2 – 2	South China	Mong Kok, Kowloon
17:30 (GMT+8)	Barry 15'; Diaz (yellow card) 29'; Leung Tsz Chun (yellow card) 32'; Cheung Kin Fung (yellow card) 37'; Cheung Kwok Ming 67'; Wong Chun Ho (yellow card) 83'	Report	6' Lee Chi Ho; (yellow card) 23' Sealy; (yellow card) 41' Kwok Kin Pong; 58' Leandro; (yellow card) 90' Cheng Lai Hin; (yellow card) 90' Yapp Hung Fai	Stadium: Mong Kok Stadium (Capatity:6,680); Attendance: 3333; Referee: Cheng Oi Cho; Assistant referees: Lam Chi Ho, Poon Ming Fai; Fourth official: Ho Wai Sing

=== Round 3 ===
13 September 2012	Kitchee	3 – 0	Southern	Tseung Kwan O, New Territories
20:00 (GMT+8)	Lam Ka Wai 17'; Cheng Siu Wai 76'; Tsang Kam To 87'	Report	(yellow card) 43' Fofo	Stadium: Tseung Kwan O Sports Ground (Capatity:3,500); Attendance: 601; Referee: Cheng Oi Cho; Assistant referees: Lam Chi Ho, Lam Nai Kei; Fourth official: Luk Kin Sun

15 September 2012	Tuen Mun	2 – 4	Sun Pegasus	Tuen Mun, New Territories
14:30 (GMT+8)	Diego (yellow card) 29'; Daniel 39'; Law Ka Lok (yellow card) 73'; Chao Pengfei 77'	Report	10', 90' McKee; (yellow card) 51' (goal) 79' Sandro; 67' Deng Jinghuang; (yellow card) 74' Mbome	Stadium: Tuen Mun Tang Siu Kin Sports Ground (Capatity:2,200); Attendance: 919; Referee: Liu Kwok Man; Assistant referees: Chow Chun Kit, Yu Chun San; Fourth official: Chan Ming Siu

15 September 2012	South China	2 – 1	Citizen	So Kon Po, Hong Kong Island
17:30 (GMT+8)	Lee Chi Ho (yellow card) 47' (goal) 52'; Itaparica 77'; Ticão (yellow card) 79'; Bai He (yellow card) 81'; Sealy (yellow card) 88'; Cheng Lai Hin (yellow card) 90'	Report	59' (o.g.) Itaparica; (yellow card) 81' So Loi Keung; (yellow card) 89' Paulinho	Stadium: Hong Kong Stadium (Capatity:40,000); Attendance: 2,005; Referee: Tong Kui Sum; Assistant referees: Ng Chiu Kok, Ho Wai Sing; Fourth official: Lam Shing Yan, Franky

16 September 2012	Biu Chun Rangers	1 – 4	Wofoo Tai Po	Sham Shui Po, Kowloon
14:30 (GMT+8)	Liu Songwei (red card) 61'; Leung Hing Kit (yellow card) 77'; Lam Hok Hei 87'	Report	6', 13', 21' Alex; (yellow card) 40' (yellow-red card) 58' Annan; 67' Aender	Stadium: Sham Shui Po Sports Ground (Capatity:2,194); Attendance: 625; Referee: Ng Kai Lam; Assistant referees: Chan Shui Hung, Chung Ming Sang; Fourth official: Yu Chun San

16 September 2012	Yokohama FC Hong Kong	2 – 0	Sunray Cave JC Sun Hei	Siu Sai Wan, Hong Kong Island
17:30 (GMT+8)	Lam Ngai Tong (yellow card) 38'; Lau Cheuk Hin 67', 84'; Mirko (yellow card) 79'	Report	(yellow card) 45' Li Hang Wui; (yellow card) 78' Leung Tsz Chun	Stadium: Siu Sai Wan Sports Ground (Capatity:12,000); Attendance: 795; Referee: Wong Chi Tang, Charlton; Assistant referees: Cheng Oi Cho, Poon Ming Fai; Fourth official: Lam Chi Ho

=== Round 4 ===
29 September 2012	Southern	2 – 2	Wofoo Tai Po	Aberdeen, Hong Kong Island
14:30 (GMT+8)	Chui Yiu Chung (yellow card) 12'; Landon (yellow card) 42' (goal) 54'; Rubén López 86'	Report	21' Alex; 23' Annan	Stadium: Aberdeen Sports Ground (Capatity:4,000^{1}); Attendance: 803; Referee: Liu Kwok Man; Assistant referees: Ho Wai Sing, Poon Ming Fai; Fourth official: Sarao, Amarjit Singh

29 September 2012	South China	1 – 0	Kitchee	So Kon Po, Hong Kong Island
17:30 (GMT+8)	Leandro (yellow card) 5'; Ticão (yellow card) 45'; Dhiego Martins 90+8' (yellow card) 73' (yellow-red card) 90+8'; Tse (yellow card) 81'; Lee Wai Lim (yellow card) 90+9'	Report	(yellow card) 8' Lo Kwan Yee; (yellow card) 45' Chu Siu Kei; (yellow card) 90+1' Dani; (yellow card) 90+6' Lam Ka Wai	Stadium: Hong Kong Stadium (Capatity:40,000); Attendance: 4,249; Referee: Ng Chiu Kok; Assistant referees: Chow Chun Kit, Chung Ming Sang; Fourth official: Lam Shing Yan, Franky

30 September 2012	Tuen Mun	2 – 2	Yokohama FC Hong Kong	Tuen Mun, New Territories
14:30 (GMT+8)	Lai Yiu Cheong 64'; Mauricio 70'; Li Haiqiang (yellow card) 71'; Daniel (yellow card) 90'	Report	(yellow card) 12' Mijanović; 32' Lee Ka Yiu; (yellow card) 37' Lam Ngai Tong; (yellow card) 59' Law Chun Bong; (yellow card) 63' Mirko; 86' (pen.) Yoshitake	Stadium: Tuen Mun Tang Siu Kin Sports Ground (Capatity:2,200); Attendance: 969; Referee: Ng Kai Lam; Assistant referees: Poon Ming Fai, Yu Chun San; Fourth official: Tong Kui Sum

30 September 2012	Sunray Cave JC Sun Hei	2 – 2	Biu Chun Rangers	Mong Kok, Kowloon
17:30 (GMT+8)	Zhang Chunhui (red card) 10'; Kilama (red card) 40'; Wong Chun Ho (yellow card) 67'; Ho Kwok Chuen (yellow card) 72'; Bamnjo 81' (o.g.); Barry 86'	Report	(yellow card) 9' Liu Songwei; 13' (pen.) Giovane; (yellow card) 63' Bemnjo; 76' Lam Hok Hei	Stadium: Mong Kok Stadium (Capatity:6,680); Attendance: 645; Referee: Chan Shui Hung; Assistant referees: Chow Chun Kit, Lam Shing Yan, Franky; Fourth official: Luk Kin Sun

1 October 2012	Citizen	2 – 1	Sun Pegasus	Mong Kok, Kowloon
14:30 (GMT+8)	Detinho 75'; Sham Kwok Keung 78'	Report	31' McKee; (yellow card) 88' Mbome	Stadium: Mong Kok Stadium (Capatity:6,680); Attendance: 1,094; Referee: Tong Kui Sum; Assistant referees: Lam Nai Kei, Ho Wai Sing; Fourth official: Ng Kai Lam

=== Round 5 ===
5 October 2012	Citizen	2 – 3	Biu Chun Rangers	Mong Kok, Kowloon
20:00 (GMT+8)	Campion 41' (pen.); Sham Kwok Fai (yellow card) 42'; Detinho 69'; Festus (yellow card) 89'	Report	73' Lam Hok Hei; (yellow card) 74' (goal) 85' Yeung Chi Lun; 90' (yellow card) 90' Saric	Stadium: Mong Kok Stadium (Capatity:6,680); Attendance: 488; Referee: Ng Chiu Kok; Assistant referees: Lam Chi Ho, Chung Ming Sang; Fourth official: Yu Chun San

6 October 2012	Southern	3 – 3	Sun Pegasus	Aberdeen, Hong Kong Island
14:30 (GMT+8)	Carril 23'; Rubén López 75'; Chow Ka Wa 78'; Landon Ling (yellow card) 80'	Report	28', 73' Ju Yingzhi; 39' Ng Wai Chiu	Stadium: Aberdeen Sports Ground (Capatity:4,000^{1}); Attendance: 403; Referee: Cheng Oi Cho; Assistant referees: Chan Shui Hung, Lam Shing Yan, Franky; Fourth official: Yu Kin Fung

6 October 2012	Sunray Cave JC Sun Hei	1 – 2	Tuen Mun	Mong Kok, Kowloon
17:30 (GMT+8)	Mauricio 22' (o.g.); Wong Chun Ho (yellow card) 37'; Li Hang Wui (yellow card) 51'	Report	(yellow card) 30' Chow Cheuk Fung; 32' Beto; 35' (yellow card) 81' Ling Cong	Stadium: Mong Kok Stadium (Capatity:6,680); Attendance: 751; Referee: Liu Kwok Man; Assistant referees: Chow Chun Kit, Poon Ming Fai; Fourth official: Ho Wai Sing

7 October 2012	Wofoo Tai Po	0 – 5	South China	Tai Po, New Territories
14:30 (GMT+8)	Aender (yellow card) 45'	Report	6', 54' Lee Hong Lim; 13' Itaparica; (yellow card) 14' Luk Chi Ho; (yellow card) 15' Kwok Kin Pong; (yellow card) 21' Ticão; 29', 72' Au Yeung Yiu Chung; (yellow card) 37' Cheng Lai Hin	Stadium: Tai Po Sports Ground (Capatity:3,000); Attendance: 1,723; Referee: Ng Kai Lam; Assistant referees: Lam Nai Kei, Yu Chun San; Fourth official: Chan Ming Siu

7 October 2012	Yokohama FC Hong Kong	1 – 4	Kitchee	Mong Kok, Kowloon
17:30 (GMT+8)	Law Chun Bong (red card) 14'; Lee Ka Ho (yellow card) 49' (yellow-red card) 58'; Yoshitake (yellow card) 58' (goal) 90'	Report	25', 35' Chu Siu Kei; 51', 77' Yago; (yellow card) 58' Cheng Siu Wai	Stadium: Mong Kok Stadium ^{2} (Capatity:6,680); Attendance: 1,895; Referee: Ng Chiu Kok; Assistant referees: Cheng Oi Cho, Lam Chi Ho; Fourth official: Lau Fong Hei

=== Round 6 ===
20 October 2012	Tuen Mun	1 – 0	Biu Chun Rangers	Tuen Mun, New Territories
14:30 (GMT+8)	Mauricio (yellow card) 8'; Li Haiqiang (yellow card) 18'; Daniel 46'; Kwok Wing Sun (yellow card) 84'; Ling Cong (yellow card) 87'	Report	(yellow card) 9' Liu Songwei; (yellow card) 84' Akosah; (yellow card) 90+2' Yeung Chi Lun	Stadium: Tuen Mun Tang Siu Kin Sports Ground (Capatity:2,200); Attendance: 619; Referee: Ng Kai Lam; Assistant referees: Chan Shui Hung, Chow Chun Kit; Fourth official: Sarao, Amarjit Singh

20 October 2012	South China	0 – 0	Southern	So Kon Po, Hong Kong Island
17:30 (GMT+8)	Tse (yellow card) 33'	Report	(yellow card) 49' Ip Chung Long; (yellow card) 57' Carril; (yellow card) 74' Rubén López; (yellow card) 90+4' Tsui Yiu Chung	Stadium: Hong Kong Stadium (Capatity:40,000); Attendance: 1,476; Referee: Tong Kui Sum; Assistant referees: Cheng Oi Cho, Poon Ming Fai; Fourth official: Lam Nai Kei

21 October 2012	Wofoo Tai Po	1 – 1	Sunray Cave JC Sun Hei	Tai Po, New Territories
14:30 (GMT+8)	Alex 34'; Wong Yim Kwan (yellow card) 51'; Lui Chi Hing (yellow card) 90'	Report	(yellow card) 12' Cheung Kwok Ming; (yellow card) 53' Roberto; 58' Barry; (yellow card) 88' Kilama	Stadium: Tai Po Sports Ground (Capatity:3,000); Attendance: 580; Referee: Liu Kwok Man; Assistant referees: Ng Kai Lam, Ho Wai Sing; Fourth official: Lo Yuk Ming Ricky

21 October 2012	Kitchee	4 – 2	Sun Pegasus	Tseung Kwan O, New Territories
17:30 (GMT+8)	Jordi 39', 66'; Couñago 64', 77'; Liu Quankun (yellow card) 82'	Report	(yellow card) 29' Mbome; (yellow card) 42' Li Jian; 57', 63' McKee; (yellow card) 88' Lee Wai Lun; (yellow card) 89' Chuck Yiu Kwok	Stadium: Tseung Kwan O Sports Ground (Capatity:3,500); Attendance: 850; Referee: Ng Chiu Kok; Assistant referees: Chow Chun Kit, Chung Ming Sang; Fourth official: Yu Chun San

23 October 2012	Citizen	3 – 0	Yokohama FC Hong Kong	Mong Kok, Kowloon
14:30 (GMT+8)	Festus (yellow card) 33' (goal) 65'; Detinho 52'; Tam Lok Hin (yellow card) 74' (goal) 90'	Report	(yellow card) 12' Leung Kwok Wai	Stadium: Mong Kok Stadium (Capatity:6,680); Attendance: 1,231; Referee: Cheng Oi Cho; Assistant referees: Chan Shui Hung, Lam Nai Kei; Fourth official: Lam Chi Ho

=== Round 7 ===
26 October 2012	Yokohama FC Hong Kong	2 – 4	Biu Chun Rangers	Siu Sai Wan, Hong Kong Island
20:00 (GMT+8)	Yoshitake 40'; Wong Wai 64'	Report	15' Akosah; 36', 63' Lam Hok Hei; 41' Giovane; (yellow card) 43' Chan Siu Yuen; (yellow card) 90+2' Chak Ting Fung	Stadium: Siu Sai Wan Sports Ground (Capatity:12,000); Attendance: 264; Referee: Tong Kui Sum; Assistant referees: Lam Chi Ho, Chung Ming Sang; Fourth official: Luk Kin Sun

3 November 2012	Southern	3 – 1	Citizen	Aberdeen, Hong Kong Island
14:30 (GMT+8)	Dieguito 22' (yellow card) 61'; Landon Ling 44' (yellow card) 50'; Carril (yellow card) 55' (goal) 69'; Chan Cheuk Kwong (yellow card) 83'	Report	2' Hélio; (yellow card) 77' Chiu Chun Kit; (yellow card) 89' Henry	Stadium: Aberdeen Sports Ground (Capatity:4,000^{1}); Attendance: 385; Referee: Ng Chiu Kok; Assistant referees: Chan Shui Hung, Poon Ming Fai; Fourth official: Sarao, Amarjit Singh

3 November 2012	Sun Pegasus	2 – 0	Sunray Cave JC Sun Hei	Yuen Long, New Territories
17:30 (GMT+8)	Thiago (yellow card) 26'; Juninho (yellow card) 70'; Mbome 75'; Tong Kin Man 79'	Report	(yellow card) 43' Cheung Kwok Ming	Stadium: Yuen Long Stadium (Capatity:4,932); Attendance: 529; Referee: Ng Kai Lam; Assistant referees: Ho Wai Sing, Chung Ming Sang; Fourth official: Yu Chun San

4 November 2012	Wofoo Tai Po	1 – 3	Kitchee	Tai Po, New Territories
14:30 (GMT+8)	Li Shu Yeung 60'; Jing Teng (red card) 88'	Report	5' (pen.), 45' Couñago; 90' Jordi	Stadium: Tai Po Sports Ground (Capatity:3,000); Attendance: 920; Referee: Tong Kui Sum; Assistant referees: Chow Chun Kit, Lam Nai Kei; Fourth official: Wong Yin Wai

11 November 2012	South China	2 – 1	Tuen Mun	So Kon Po, Hong Kong Island
14:30 (GMT+8)	Luk Chi Ho 34'; Ticão (yellow card) 43' (yellow-red card) 90'; Itaparica 62'; Mauro (yellow card) 81'; Lee Hong Lim (yellow card) 90'	Report	(yellow card) 16' Daniel; (yellow card) 44' Kwok Wing Sun; 45' (yellow card) 78' Mauricio; (yellow card) 83' Diego	Stadium: Hong Kong Stadium (Capatity:40,000); Attendance: 1,977; Referee: Tong Kui Sum; Assistant referees: Poon Ming Fai, Yu Chun San; Fourth official: Sarao, Amarjit Singh

=== Round 8 ===
27 October 2012	Kitchee	1 – 1	Tuen Mun	Tseung Kwan O, New Territories
14:30 (GMT+8)	Spitz (yellow card) 10'; Jordi 24'; Lo Kwan Yee (yellow card) 90'	Report	(yellow card) 39' Kwok Wing Sun; 78' Yip Tsz Chun; (yellow card) 86' Daniel; (yellow card) 88' Mauricio; (yellow card) 90' Cheung Yiu Ting	Stadium: Tseung Kwan O Sports Ground (Capatity:3,500); Attendance: 849; Referee: Cheng Oi Cho; Assistant referees: Liu Kwok Man, Poon Ming Fai; Fourth official: Lam Shing Yan, Franky

4 November 2012	Biu Chun Rangers	1 – 3	South China	Mong Kok, Kowloon
14:30 (GMT+8)	Bamnjo 31' (yellow card) 33' (yellow-red card); Miroslav (yellow card) 86'	Report	9' Mauro; 36' Dhiego; 83' Chan Wai Ho	Stadium: Mong Kok Stadium^{3} (Capatity:6,680); Attendance: 1,738; Referee: Cheng Oi Cho; Assistant referees: Lam Shing Yan, Yu Chun San; Fourth official: Ho Wai Sing

10 November 2012	Southern	2 – 1	Sunray Cave JC Sun Hei	Aberdeen, Hong Kong Island
14:30 (GMT+8)	Landon Ling 18' (yellow card) 47'; Ip Chung Long 70'	Report	(yellow card) 44' Barry; (yellow card) 64' Diaz; (yellow card) 82' Cheung Chi Yung; 88' Leung Tsz Chun; (yellow card) 90+1' Pak Wing Chak; (yellow card) 90+3' Cheung Kin Fung	Stadium: Aberdeen Sports Ground (Capatity:4,000^{1}); Attendance: 523; Referee: Chan Shui Hung; Assistant referees: Chow Chun Kit, Luk Kin Sun; Fourth official: Lam Shing Yan Franky

10 November 2012	Sun Pegasus	1 – 2	Yokohama FC Hong Kong	Yuen Long, New Territories
17:30 (GMT+8)	Thiago 11'; Ju Yingzhi (yellow card) 50'; Deng Jinghuang (yellow card) 81'; Mbome (yellow card) 86'	Report	44', 74' Yoshitake; (yellow card) 47' Fong Pak Lun; (yellow card) 81' (yellow-red card) 90+3' Lau Cheuk Hin	Stadium: Yuen Long Stadium (Capatity:4,932); Attendance: 424; Referee: Ho Wai Sing; Assistant referees: Tong Kui Sum, Chung Ming Sang; Fourth official: Yu Chun San

11 November 2012	Citizen	7 – 3	Wofoo Tai Po	Mong Kok, Kowloon
17:30 (GMT+8)	Festus 20' (yellow card) 60'; Tam Lok Hin (yellow card) 28'; Nakamura 36', 90'; Detinho 48', 71', 72'; Sham Kwok Keung 75'; Hélio (yellow card) 76'	Report	40' Annan; 42', 45+1' Alex	Stadium: Mong Kok Stadium (Capatity:6,680); Attendance: 757; Referee: Cheng Oi Cho; Assistant referees: Chow Chun Kit, Chung Ming Sang; Fourth official: Ho Wai Sing

=== Round 9 ===
20 December 2012	Sunray Cave JC Sun Hei	1 – 1	Citizen	Mong Kok, Kowloon
20:00 (GMT+8)	Cheung Kwok Ming (yellow card) 66'; Barry 84'	Report	(yellow card) 58' (goal) 71' Hélio; (yellow card) 90+3' Festus	Stadium: Mong Kok Stadium (Capatity:6,680); Attendance: 318; Referee: Liu Kwok Man; Assistant referees: Chow Chun Kit, Lau Fong Hei; Fourth official: Luk Kin Sun

22 December 2012	Yokohama FC Hong Kong	0 – 0	Southern	Siu Sai Wan, Hong Kong Island
14:30 (GMT+8)	Mijanović (yellow card) 69'	Report	(yellow card) 29' Tsang Chiu Tat; (yellow card) 88' Dieguito	Stadium: Siu Sai Wan Sports Ground (Capatity:12,000); Attendance: 549; Referee: Cheng Oi Cho; Assistant referees: Lam Chi Ho, Liu Kwok Man; Fourth official: Yau Tsz Yeung

22 December 2012	Sun Pegasus	0 – 3	South China	Yuen Long, New Territories
17:30 (GMT+8)	Lo Chun Kit (yellow card) 28'; Ng Wai Chiu (yellow card) 31'; Ngan Lok Fung (yellow card) 50'; Thiago (yellow card) 73'	Report	(yellow card) 60' Ticão; 65' Kwok Kin Pong; 79' Cheng Lai Hin; 85' Lee Wai Lim; (yellow card) 90+1' Joel	Stadium: Yuen Long Stadium (Capatity:4,932); Attendance: 1,616; Referee: Ng Chiu Kok; Assistant referees: Ho Wai Sing, Chung Ming Sang; Fourth official: Lam Shing Yan

23 December 2012	Tuen Mun	1 – 0	Wofoo Tai Po	Tuen Mun, New Territories
14:30 (GMT+8)	Xie Silida (yellow card) 25'; Beto 32'; Lai Yiu Cheong (yellow card) 65'; Wong Chi Chung (yellow card) 72' (yellow-red card) 82'; Kwok Wing Sun (yellow card) 84'	Report	(yellow card) 6' Chen Liming; (red card) 30' Li Hon Ho	Stadium: Tuen Mun Tang Siu Kin Sports Ground (Capatity:2,200); Attendance: 638; Referee: Ng Kai Lam; Assistant referees: Chow Chun Kit, Luk Kin Sun; Fourth official: Ho Wai Sing

23 December 2012	Biu Chun Rangers	2 – 7	Kitchee	Mong Kok, Kowloon
17:30 (GMT+8)	Giovane 36'; Liu Songwei 56'	Report	3', 79' (pen.) Couñago; 13', 41' Jordi; 47' Cheng Siu Wai; 72' Liu Quankun; 86' Chu Siu Kei	Stadium: Mong Kok Stadium^{3} (Capatity:6,680); Attendance: 2,643; Referee: Tong Kui Sum; Assistant referees: Lam Shing Yan, Poon Ming Fai; Fourth official: Cheng Oi Cho

=== Round 10 ===
18 January 2013	South China	5 – 1	Wofoo Tai Po	So Kon Po, Hong Kong Island
20:00 (GMT+8)	Lee Hong Lim 25'; Chak Ting Fung (yellow card) 27'; Itaparica 39' (pen.); Ticão (yellow card) 43' (goal) 65' (yellow card) 66' (red card); Joel (yellow card) 50'; Au Yeung Yiu Chung 58', 71' (yellow card) 59'	Report	(yellow card) 35' Lui Chi Hing; (yellow card) 58' Li Shu Yeung; 86' Alex	Stadium: Hong Kong Stadium (Capatity:40,000); Attendance: 1,269; Referee: Cheng Oi Cho; Assistant referees: Chan Shui Hung, Lam Nai Kei; Fourth official: Tong Kui Sum

19 January 2013	Tuen Mun	4 – 2	Sunray Cave JC Sun Hei	Tuen Mun, New Territories
14:30 (GMT+8)	Beto 30' (pen.), 33'; Xie Silida (yellow card) 60'; Daniel 73' (yellow card) 83'; Li Haiqiang (yellow card) 75'; Chao Pengfei 84'; Mauricio (yellow card) 90'	Report	(yellow card) 28' Zhang Chunhui; (yellow card) 32' Pak Wing Chak; 49', 88' Diaz; (yellow card) 84' Leung Ka Hai	Stadium: Tuen Mun Tang Siu Kin Sports Ground (Capatity:2,200); Attendance: 665; Referee: Ho Wai Sing; Assistant referees: Chow Chun Kit, Yu Chun San; Fourth official: Luk Kin Sun

19 January 2013	Sun Pegasus	1 – 1	Southern	Yuen Long, New Territories
17:30 (GMT+8)	Lee Wai Lun (yellow card) 34'; Xu Deshuai (yellow card) 39' (goal) 88'	Report	(yellow card) 7' Lander; 33' Dieguito; (yellow card) 39' Landon Ling	Stadium: Yuen Long Stadium (Capatity:4,932); Attendance: 460; Referee: Tong Kui Sum; Assistant referees: Chung Ming Sang, Amarjit Singh Sarao; Fourth official: Cheng Oi Cho

20 January 2013	Biu Chun Rangers	3 – 3	Citizen	Sham Shui Po, Kowloon
14:30 (GMT+8)	Leung Hing Kit (red card) 33'; Bamnjo (yellow card) 53'; Giovane 57', 90+5'; Lau Nim Yat (yellow card) 78'; Cheng King Ho 86'	Report	35' Featus; (yellow card) 37' Sandro; (yellow card) 63' Chan Hin Kwong; (yellow card) 67' (goal) 79', 81' Sham Kwok Keung	Stadium: Sham Shui Po Sports Ground (Capatity:2,194); Attendance: 453; Referee: Liu Kwok Man; Assistant referees: Chan Shui Hung, Poon Ming Fai; Fourth official: Ho Wai Sing

20 January 2013	Kitchee	2 – 2	Yokohama FC Hong Kong	Tseung Kwan O, New Territories
17:30 (GMT+8)	Jordi 2'; Recio (yellow card) 9'; Yago 82'	Report	22' (yellow card) 90+3' (yellow-red card) 90+6' Yoshitake; (yellow card) 40' Mirko; 54' Mijanović; (yellow card) 64' Chan Siu Kwan	Stadium: Tseung Kwan O Sports Ground (Capatity:3,500); Attendance: 759; Referee: Ng Chiu Kok; Assistant referees: Chung Ming Sang, Lam Shing Yan Franky; Fourth official: Chow Chun Kit

=== Round 11 ===
31 January 2013	Kitchee	1 – 2	Biu Chun Rangers	Tseung Kwan O, New Territories
20:00 (GMT+8)	Chu Siu Kei 53'; Yago (yellow card) 59'; Tsang Chi Hau (yellow card) 67'	Report	(yellow card) 41' Juninho; 62' Giovane; 68' Saric	Stadium: Tseung Kwan O Sports Ground (Capatity:3,500); Attendance: 457; Referee: Cheng Oi Cho; Assistant referees: Chan Shui Hung, Chung Ming Sang; Fourth official: Lui Siu Chuen

1 February 2013 Rescheduled	Citizen	1 – 2	Sunray Cave JC Sun Hei	Mong Kok, Kowloon
20:00 (GMT+8)	Wong Yiu Fu (yellow card) 16'; Zhang Chunhui 37' (o.g.); Gustavo (yellow card) 51'; Sandro (yellow card) 79'	Report	24' Diaz; 43' Roberto; (yellow card) 90+4' Chow Kwok Wai	Stadium: Mong Kok Stadium (Capatity:6,680); Attendance: 408; Referee: Ng Kai Lam; Assistant referees: Lam Chi Ho, Yau Tsz Yeung; Fourth official: Ho Wai Sing

2 February 2013	Southern	1 – 0	Yokohama FC Hong Kong	Aberdeen, Hong Kong Island
14:30 (GMT+8)	Carril 6' (yellow card) 90+4'; Fofo (yellow card) 70'; Chan Cheuk Kwong (yellow card) 78'; Chiu Yu Ming (yellow card) 84'; Cheng Chi Wing (yellow card) 87'	Report	(yellow card) 28' Law Chun Bong; (yellow card) 66' Chan Siu Kwan; (yellow card) 88' Leung Kwok Wai; (yellow card) 90+3' Leung Kwun Chung; (yellow card) 90+5' Mijanović	Stadium: Aberdeen Sports Ground (Capatity:4,000^{1}); Attendance: 487; Referee: Ho Wai Sing; Assistant referees: Chan Shui Hung, Lam Nai Kei; Fourth official: Yu Chun San

2 February 2013	South China	1 – 1	Sun Pegasus	So Kon Po, Hong Kong Island
17:30 (GMT+8)	Kwok Kin Pong (yellow card) 13'; Dhiego 90+1'	Report	(yellow card) 2' Deng Jinghuang; (yellow card) 2' Chan Pak Hang; (yellow card) 4' Tong Kin Man; 10' (pen.) McKee; (yellow card) 42' Bai He; (yellow card) 60' Xu Deshuai; (yellow card) 63' Lo Chun Kit; (yellow card) 90' Li Jian	Stadium: Hong Kong Stadium (Capatity:40,000); Attendance: 1,137; Referee: Liu Kwok Man; Assistant referees: Chow Chun Kit, Lam Shing Yan Franky; Fourth official: Lui Siu Chuen

3 February 2013	Wofoo Tai Po	3 – 1	Tuen Mun	Tai Po, New Territories
14:30 (GMT+8)	Diego 8' (o.g.); Chen Liming 11'; Annan 83'	Report	(yellow card) 28' Beto; 90+4' Ling Cong	Stadium: Tai Po Sports Ground (Capatity:3,000); Attendance: 766; Referee: Tong Kui Sum; Assistant referees: Cheng Oi Cho, Poon Ming Fai; Fourth official: Fok Pong Shing

=== Round 12 ===
26 January 2013 Rescheduled	South China	6 – 1	Biu Chun Rangers	Mong Kok, Kowloon
15:00 (GMT+8)	Lee Wai Lim 51', 90'; Celin 52'; Itaparica 64' (yellow card) 76'; Lee Hong Lim 70'; Au Yeung Yiu Chung 84'	Report	13' Lam Hok Hei; (yellow card) 59' Chan Siu Yuen	Stadium: Mong Kok Stadium^{4} (Capatity:6,680); Attendance: 1,858; Referee: Tong Kui Sum; Assistant referees: Chan Shui Hung, Ho Wai Sing; Fourth official: Lam Nai Kei

23 February 2013	Wofoo Tai Po	3 – 1	Citizen	Tai Po, New Territories
14:30 (GMT+8)	Annan 17'; Clayton (yellow card) 43'; Ye Jia 49'	Report	13' Sandro; (yellow card) 55' Gustavo; (yellow card) 61' Chiu Chun Kit	Stadium: Tai Po Sports Ground (Capatity:3,000); Attendance: 527; Referee: Cheng Oi Cho; Assistant referees: Chow Chun Kit, Lam Nai Kei; Fourth official: Lam Shing Yan Franky

23 February 2013 Rescheduled	Sunray Cave JC Sun Hei	3 – 2	Southern	Mong Kok, Kowloon
17:30 (GMT+8)	Leung Tsz Chun 4' (pen.), 79' (pen.); Díaz (yellow card) 29'; Kilama (yellow card) 43'; Yeung Chi Lun (yellow card) 70'; Kot Cho Wai 75' (yellow card) 76'; Su Yang (yellow card) 90'	Report	(yellow card) 4' Chiu Yu Ming; (yellow card) 27' Dieguito; 45+1' (yellow card) 90+7' Rubén; 53' (yellow card) 65' Carril; (yellow card) 88' Ip Chung Long	Stadium: Mong Kok Stadium (Capatity:6,680); Attendance: 732; Referee: Ng Kai Lam; Assistant referees: Tong Kui Sum, Yu Chun San; Fourth official: Lui Siu Chuen

24 February 2013	Tuen Mun	0 – 2	Kitchee	Tuen Mun, New Territories
14:30 (GMT+8)	Diego (yellow card) 90+3'	Report	(yellow card) 15' Tsang Kam To; 36' Gao Wen; (yellow card) 66' Ngan Lok Fung; 90+4' Lo Chi Kwan	Stadium: Tuen Mun Tang Siu Kin Sports Ground (Capatity:2,200); Attendance: 943; Referee: Ho Wai Sing; Assistant referees: Chan Shui Hung, Poon Ming Fai; Fourth official: Yu Kin Fung

24 February 2013	Yokohama FC Hong Kong	1 – 1	Sun Pegasus	Siu Sai Wan, Hong Kong Island
17:30 (GMT+8)	Mijanović 4'; Lau Cheuk Hin (yellow card) 36'; Leung Kwun Chung (yellow card) 90+4'	Report	(yellow card) 5' So Wai Chuen; (yellow card) 38' Mbome; (yellow card) 42' Bai He; (yellow card) 68' Miović; 77' Deng Jinghuang; (yellow card) 84' Tong Kin Man	Stadium: Siu Sai Wan Sports Ground (Capatity:12,000); Attendance: 503; Referee: Ng Chiu Kok; Assistant referees: Lui Siu Chuen, Fok Pong Shing; Fourth official: Cheng Oi Cho

=== Round 13 ===
1 March 2013	Sun Pegasus	4 – 0	Tuen Mun	Yuen Long, New Territories
20:00 (GMT+8)	McKee 6', 29'; Lo Chun Kit 8'; Karalić 36'; Lee Wai Lun (yellow card) 90'	Report		Stadium: Yuen Long Stadium (Capatity:4,932); Attendance: 597; Referee: Cheng Oi Cho; Assistant referees: Poon Ming Fai, Yu Chun San; Fourth official: Tong Kui Sum

2 March 2013	Southern	0 – 1	Kitchee	Aberdeen, Hong Kong Island
14:30 (GMT+8)		Report	(yellow card) 9' Dani; 27' Lo Kwan Yee; (yellow card) 89' Wang Zhenpeng	Stadium: Aberdeen Sports Ground (Capatity:4,000^{1}); Attendance: 546; Referee: Ho Wai Sing; Assistant referees: Lui Siu Chuen, Lam Chi Ho; Fourth official: Luk Kin Sun

3 March 2013	Wofoo Tai Po	1 – 1	Biu Chun Rangers	Tai Po, New Territories
14:30 (GMT+8)	Annan 8'; Alex (yellow card) 85'	Report	4' Giovane; (yellow card) 70' Juninho	Stadium: Tai Po Sports Ground (Capatity:3,000); Attendance: 662; Referee: Ng Chiu Kok; Assistant referees: Chan Shui Hung, Lau Fong Hei; Fourth official: Yu Chun San

3 March 2013	Citizen	0 – 1	South China	Mong Kok, Kowloon
17:30 (GMT+8)	Hélio (yellow card) 90+3'	Report	36' Itaparica	Stadium: Mong Kok Stadium (Capatity:6,680); Attendance: 1,956; Referee: Tong Kui Sum; Assistant referees: Chow Chun Kit, Chung Ming Sang; Fourth official: Cheng Oi Cho

24 March 2013 Postponed	Sunray Cave JC Sun Hei	1 – 1	Yokohama FC Hong Kong	Mong Kok, Kowloon
14:30 (GMT+8)	Su Yang (yellow card) 20'; Roberto 62'; Liang Zicheng (yellow card) 76'; Zhang Chunhui (yellow card) 90'	Report	(yellow card) 4' Fong Pak Lun; 19' Lee Ka Yiu; (yellow card) 73' (yellow-red card) 81' Lee Ka Ho; (yellow card) 90' Leung Kwun Chung	Stadium: Mong Kok Stadium (Capatity:6,680); Attendance: 627; Referee: Cheng Oi Cho; Assistant referees: Lui Siu Chuen, Sarao Amarjit Singh; Fourth official: Lam Chi Ho

=== Round 14 ===
16 March 2013	Tuen Mun	2 – 1	South China	Tuen Mun, New Territories
14:30 (GMT+8)	Ling Cong (yellow card) 16'; Beto (yellow card) 18'; Li Haiqiang (yellow card) 36' (yellow-red card) 80'; Daniel (yellow card) 61' (goal) 73' (red card) 83'; Yip Tsz Chun 63'; Diego (yellow card) 90+5'	Report	90+3' Luk Chi Ho	Stadium: Tuen Mun Tang Siu Kin Sports Ground (Capatity:2,200); Attendance: 1,311; Referee: Ng Kai Lam; Assistant referees: Chung Ming Sang, Lam Nai Kei; Fourth official: Cheng Oi Cho

16 March 2013	Citizen	0 – 1	Southern	Mong Kok, Kowloon
17:30 (GMT+8)	Gustavo (yellow card) 16'; Chiu Chun Kit (yellow card) 22'; Sandro (yellow card) 24'; Chan Hin Kwong (yellow card) 41'; Tse Tak Him (yellow card) 66'; Nakamura (yellow card) 73'; Campion (yellow card) 83'	Report	23' (pen.) (yellow card) 71' Carril; (yellow card) 30' Chung Hon Chee; (yellow card) 44' Tse Man Wing	Stadium: Mong Kok Stadium (Capatity:6,680); Attendance: 639; Referee: Ng Chiu Kok; Assistant referees: Lam Chi Ho, Tang Hing Fu; Fourth official: Yu Chun San

17 March 2013	Biu Chun Rangers	1 – 1	Yokohama FC Hong Kong	Sham Shui Po, Kowloon
14:30 (GMT+8)	Lam Hok Hei (yellow card) 24'; Luciano 63'; Bamnjo (yellow card) 77'; Akosah (yellow card) 86'; Miroslav (yellow card) 90+3'	Report	(yellow card) 43' Lam Ngai Tong; (yellow card) 60' Leung Kwok Wai; (yellow card) 82' Fong Pak Lun; (yellow card) 88' Chan Siu Kwan; 90+5' Lee Ka Yiu	Stadium: Sham Shui Po Sports Ground (Capatity:2,194); Attendance: 399; Referee: Ho Wai Sing; Assistant referees: Chung Ming Sang, Poon Ming Fai; Fourth official: Chow Chun Kit

17 March 2013	Kitchee	2 – 2	Wofoo Tai Po	Tseung Kwan O, New Territories
17:30 (GMT+8)	Lo Kwan Yee (yellow card) 45+1'; Chan Man Fai 51', 53'; Huang Yang (yellow card) 85'	Report	60' To Hon To; (yellow card) 84' Clayton; 85' Annan	Stadium: Tseung Kwan O Sports Ground (Capatity:3,500); Attendance: 708; Referee: Tong Kui Sum; Assistant referees: Lui Siu Chuen, Yu Chun San; Fourth official: Fok Pong Shing

18 March 2013	Sunray Cave JC Sun Hei	0 – 0	Sun Pegasus	Mong Kok, Kowloon
20:00 (GMT+8)	Barry (yellow card) 21'; Zhang Chunhui (yellow card) 65'	Report	(yellow card) 64' Mbome; (yellow card) 86' Tong Kin Man	Stadium: Mong Kok Stadium (Capatity:6,680); Attendance: 506; Referee: Cheng Oi Cho; Assistant referees: Lam Chi Ho, Chan Ming Siu; Fourth official: Lui Siu Chuen

=== Round 15 ===
29 March 2013	Tuen Mun	0 – 5	Citizen	Tuen Mun, New Territories
14:30 (GMT+8)	Mauricio (yellow card) 24'; Xie Silida (yellow card) 44'; Kwok Wing Sun (yellow card) 62'	Report	(yellow card) 16' Gustavo; 25' (pen.) Festus; (yellow card) 40' Chan Hin Kwong; 48', 63', 69' (yellow card) 61' Nakamura; 75' Sham Kwok Fai	Stadium: Tuen Mun Tang Siu Kin Sports Ground (Capatity:2,200); Attendance: 775; Referee: Cheng Oi Cho; Assistant referees: Yu Chun San, Yu Kin Fung; Fourth official: Ho Wai Sing

29 March 2013 Rescheduled	Kitchee	1 – 1	Sunray Cave JC Sun Hei	Tseung Kwan O, New Territories
17:30 (GMT+8)	Couñago 64'	Report	32' Barry; (yellow card) 42' Leung Ka Hai	Stadium: Tseung Kwan O Sports Ground (Capatity:3,500); Attendance: 714; Referee: Tong Kui Sum; Assistant referees: Lam Shing Yan Franky, Lau Fong Hei; Fourth official: Chan Shui Hung

30 March 2013	Southern	3 – 1	Biu Chun Rangers	Aberdeen, Hong Kong Island
14:30 (GMT+8)	Rubén 9' (yellow card) 60'; Ngue 77'; Dieguito 82'	Report	(yellow card) 41' Akosah; (yellow card) 60' Lam Hok Hei; (yellow card) 67' Lau Nim Yat; 87' Giovane	Stadium: Aberdeen Sports Ground (Capatity:4,000^{1}); Attendance: 301; Referee: Chan Shui Hung; Assistant referees: Poon Ming Fai, Luk Kin Sun; Fourth official: Cheng Oi Cho

30 March 2013	Yokohama FC Hong Kong	0 – 0 (Abandoned^{5})	South China	Mong Kok, Kowloon
17:30 (GMT+8)	Lo Kong Wai (yellow card) 7' /Chan Siu Kwan (yellow card) 21'; Law Chun Bong (yellow card) 22'	Report		Stadium: Mong Kok Stadium^{2} (Capatity:6,680); Referee: Ng Chiu Kok; Assistant referees: Liu Kwok Man, Lam Chi Ho; Fourth official: Chow Chun Kit

31 March 2013	Wofoo Tai Po	2 – 2	Sun Pegasus	Tai Po, New Territories
14:30 (GMT+8)	Aender 45+2'; Clayton (yellow card) 63'; Ye Jia 87'	Report	31' Xu Deshuai; 75' Cesar; (yellow card) 80' Lo Chun Kit	Stadium: Tai Po Sports Ground (Capatity:3,000); Attendance: 888; Referee: Ho Wai Sing; Assistant referees: Chow Chun Kit, Chung Ming Sang; Fourth official: Yau Tsz Yeung

4 April 2013 Replay	Yokohama FC Hong Kong	1 – 0	South China	Siu Sai Wan, Hong Kong Island
14:30 (GMT+8)	Yoshitake 13'; Chan Siu Kwan (yellow card) 42'; Mijanović (yellow card) 42'; Leung Kwun Chung (yellow card) 55'; Fukuda (yellow card) 83'	Report	(yellow card) 26' Ticão; (yellow card) 88' Luk Chi Ho; (yellow card) 90+1' Celin	Stadium: Siu Sai Wan Sports Ground (Capatity:12,000); Attendance: 946; Referee: Ho Wai Sing; Assistant referees: Chan Shui Hung, Poon Ming Fai; Fourth official: Lui Siu Chuen

=== Round 16 ===
12 April 2013	Sun Pegasus	0 – 0	Citizen	Yuen Long, New Territories
20:00 (GMT+8)	Ho Kwok Chuen (yellow card) 37'; Lo Chun Kit (yellow card) 74'; Bai He (yellow card) 84'	Report	(yellow card) 9' Chan Hin Kwong; (yellow card) 39' Nakamura; (yellow card) 58' So Loi Keung; (yellow card) 82' Sham Kwok Fai; (yellow card) 87' Hélio	Stadium: Yuen Long Stadium (Capatity:4,932); Attendance: 397; Referee: Ng Kai Lam; Assistant referees: Chung Ming Sang, Yu Chun San; Fourth official: Chan Shui Hung

13 April 2013	Wofoo Tai Po	2 – 1	Southern	Tai Po, New Territories
14:30 (GMT+8)	Alex 44'; Clayton 45+4'; Annan (yellow card) 90'	Report	(yellow card) 4' (goal) 9' Chan Cheuk Kwong; (yellow card) 32' Tse Man Wing; (yellow card) 80' Dieguito; (yellow card) 90+2' Ha Shing Chi	Stadium: Tai Po Sports Ground (Capatity:3,000); Attendance: 758; Referee: Ho Wai Sing; Assistant referees: Chow Chun Kit, Luk Kin Sun; Fourth official: Yau Ho Fai Leo

13 April 2013	Yokohama FC Hong Kong	2 – 4	Tuen Mun	Siu Sai Wan, Hong Kong Island
17:30 (GMT+8)	Fukuda 52' (pen.); Fong Pak Lun (yellow card) 62' (goal) 81'; Leung Kwok Wai (yellow card) 73'	Report	2' Mauricio; 35' Ling Cong; 43' Chao Pengfei; (yellow card) 51' Diego; 74' (pen.) Beto	Stadium: Siu Sai Wan Sports Ground (Capatity:12,000); Referee: Cheng Oi Cho; Assistant referees: Chan Shui Hung, Tang Hing Fu; Fourth official: Lau Fong Hei

14 April 2013	Biu Chun Rangers	2 – 2	Sunray Cave JC Sun Hei	Sham Shui Po, Kowloon
14:30 (GMT+8)	Sashi (yellow card) 28'; Bamnjo 55'; Akosah 58'	Report	24' Barry; 41' Leung Tsz Chun; (yellow card) 45+2' Diaz	Stadium: Sham Shui Po Sports Ground (Capatity:2,194); Attendance: 427; Referee: Liu Kwok Man; Assistant referees: Lui Siu Chuen, Fok Pong Shing; Fourth official: Lam Shing Yan Franky

14 April 2013	Kitchee	1 – 4	South China	Tseung Kwan O, New Territories
17:30 (GMT+8)	Chan Man Fai (yellow card) 31'; Rehman (yellow card) 43'; Liu Quankun (yellow card) 84'; Huang Yang 89'; Wang Zhenpeng (red card) 90+4'	Report	(yellow card) 28' Tse; 40' (pen.) Itaparica; (yellow card) 52' Chan Wai Ho; 73' Celin; 81' Lee Hong Lim; 90+7' Dhiego Martins	Stadium: Tseung Kwan O Sports Ground (Capatity:5,000^{6}); Attendance: 3,613; Referee: Ng Chiu Kok; Assistant referees: Tong Kui Sum, Lam Chi Ho; Fourth official: Lam Nai Kei

=== Round 17 ===
18 April 2013	Yokohama FC Hong Kong	1 – 1	Citizen	Siu Sai Wan, Hong Kong Island
20:00 (GMT+8)	Fukuda 33'; Mirko (yellow card) 72'; Mijanović (yellow card) 80'	Report	80' Sham Kwok Keung	Stadium: Siu Sai Wan Sports Ground (Capatity:12,000); Attendance: 227; Referee: Liu Kwok Man; Assistant referees: Lam Chi Ho, Poon Ming Fai; Fourth official: Tang Hing Fu

19 April 2013	Sun Pegasus	1 – 1	Kitchee	Yuen Long, New Territories
20:00 (GMT+8)	Mbome (yellow card) 35'; Ho Kwok Chuen (yellow card) 45+2'; Deng Jinghuang 55' (yellow card) 64'	Report	6' (pen.) Yago; (yellow card) 76' Couñago; (yellow card) 83' Cheng Siu Wai	Stadium: Yuen Long Stadium (Capatity:4,932); Attendance: 595; Referee: Cheng Oi Cho; Assistant referees: Ng Chiu Kok, Yu Chun San; Fourth official: Chan Ming Siu

20 April 2013	Southern	3 – 2	South China	Aberdeen, Hong Kong Island
14:30 (GMT+8)	Chan Cheuk Kwong 41'; Rubén 60'; Chow Ka Wa 68'	Report	25' (o.g.) Chung Hon Chee; (yellow card) 35' (goal) 64' Celin; (yellow card) 50' (yellow-red card) 89' Lee Chi Ho; (yellow card) 72' Chan Wai Ho	Stadium: Aberdeen Sports Ground (Capatity:9,000); Attendance: 1,058; Referee: Tong Kui Sum; Assistant referees: Lam Nai Kei, Yau Ho Fai Leo; Fourth official: Ng Kai Lam

20 April 2013	Sunray Cave JC Sun Hei	3 – 2	Wofoo Tai Po	Mong Kok, Kowloon
17:30 (GMT+8)	Liang Zicheng 15' (yellow card) 90+4'; Su Yang (yellow card) 24'; Choi Kwok Wai (yellow card) 50'; James Ha 72'; Leung Tsz Chun 90+1' (yellow card) 90+2'; Yeung Chi Lun (yellow card) 90+5'; Roberto (yellow card) 90+8'	Report	(yellow card) 41' Annan; 66' Alex; (yellow card) 78' Li Shu Yeung; 87' Caleb; (yellow card) 88' Clayton	Stadium: Mong Kok Stadium (Capatity:6,680); Attendance: 1,563; Referee: Ho Wai Sing; Assistant referees: Chow Chun Kit, Chung Ming Sang; Fourth official: Luk Kin Sun

21 April 2013	Biu Chun Rangers	1 – 4	Tuen Mun	Sham Shui Po, Kowloon
14:30 (GMT+8)	Akosah 8' (yellow card) 40'; Liu Songwei (yellow card) 33'; Sashi (yellow card) 75'	Report	17' Daniel; 35' Yip Tsz Chun; 38' Li Haiqiang; (yellow card) 45+1' Mauricio; (yellow card) 45+3' Wong Chi Chung; 57' Lai Yiu Cheong; (yellow card) 88' Beto	Stadium: Sham Shui Po Sports Ground (Capatity:2,194); Attendance: 502; Referee: Chan Shui Hung; Assistant referees: Poon Ming Fai, Yau Tsz Yeung; Fourth official: Ho Wai Sing

=== Round 18 ===
4 May 2013	South China	3 – 4	Sunray Cave JC Sun Hei	So Kon Po, Hong Kong Island
15:30 (GMT+8)	Itaparica 8', 35'; Man Pei Tak (yellow card) 31' (yellow-red card) 79'; Dhiego 44'; Tse (yellow card) 45' (yellow-red card) 54'; Lee Chi Ho (yellow card) 90'	Report	(yellow card) 7' Diaz; (yellow card) 12' Kilima; 31' (pen.) Roberto; 43' (yellow card) 48' Choi Kwok Wai; (yellow card) 45+1' (goal) 89' Barry; (red card) 52' Yeung Chi Lun; 80' James Ha	Stadium: Hong Kong Stadium (Capatity:40,000); Attendance: 2,254; Referee: Ng Chiu Kok; Assistant referees: Lui Siu Chuen, Poon Ming Fai; Fourth official: Chan Ming Siu

4 May 2013	Citizen	1 – 0	Kitchee	Mong Kok, Kowloon
15:30 (GMT+8)	Festus 81'	Report	(yellow card) 8' Lo Chi Kwan; (yellow card) 59' Liu Quankun; (yellow card) 73' Tsang Chi Hau	Stadium: Mong Kok Stadium (Capatity:6,680); Attendance: 1,820; Referee: Tong Kui Sum; Assistant referees: Lam Nai Kei, Yau Ho Fai Leo; Fourth official: Chan Shui Hung

4 May 2013	Biu Chun Rangers	2 – 8	Sun Pegasus	Sham Shui Po, Kowloon
15:30 (GMT+8)	Giovane 83', 89'	Report	21', 53' Ju Yingzhi; 29', 64', 72', 82', 85' McKee; 90' Karalić	Stadium: Sham Shui Po Sports Ground (Capatity:2,194); Attendance: 426; Referee: Ho Wai Sing; Assistant referees: Chung Ming Sang, Yu Chun San; Fourth official: Cheng Oi Cho

4 May 2013	Yokohama FC Hong Kong	2 – 2	Wofoo Tai Po	Siu Sai Wan, Hong Kong Island
15:30 (GMT+8)	Lee Ka Yiu 23'; Wong Wai (yellow card) 37'; Fukuda 90+5'	Report	8' (red card) 19' Alex; (yellow card) 27' Li Shu Yeung; (yellow card) 33' Clayton; 90' Aender; (yellow card) 90+3' Che Run Qiu	Stadium: Siu Sai Wan Sports Ground (Capatity:12,000); Attendance: 1,064; Referee: Liu Kwok Man; Assistant referees: Chow Chun Kit, Lam Chi Ho; Fourth official: Luk Kin Sun

5 May 2013	Southern	1 – 1	Tuen Mun	Aberdeen, Hong Kong Island
14:30 (GMT+8)	Dieguito 35' (yellow card) 43'; Ng Siu Fai (yellow card) 82'	Report	(yellow card) 52' Diego; 89' Cheung Chi Fung	Stadium: Aberdeen Sports Ground (Capatity:4,000^{1}); Attendance: 490; Referee: Cheng Oi Cho; Assistant referees: Chan Shui Hung, Lau Fong Hei; Fourth official: Tang Hing Fu

Remarks:
^{1} The capacity of Aberdeen Sports Ground is originally 9,000, but only the 4,000-seated main stand is opened for football match.
^{2} Yokohama FC Hong Kong's home matches against Kitchee and South China are played at Mong Kok Stadium instead of their usual home ground Siu Sai Wan Sports Ground.
^{3} Biu Chun Rangers's home matches against South China and Kitchee are played at Mong Kok Stadium instead of their usual home ground Sham Shui Po Sports Ground.
^{4} South China's home matches against Biu Chun Rangers will be played at Mong Kok Stadium instead of their usual home ground Hong Kong Stadium.
^{5} The match was abandoned after 28 minutes due to adverse weather and bad pitch conditions.
^{6} Since the 3,500-seated main stand was all full, the 1,500 temporary stand was opened and therefore the capacity of Tseung Kwan O Sports Ground was 5,000 in the home match against South China.

== Season play-offs ==
The play-off semi-finals were played in one match each, contested by the teams who finished in 2nd and 3rd in the 2012–13 Hong Kong First Division League table, the champions of Senior Challenge Shield and the winners of FA Cup. The winners of the semi-finals went through to the finals, with the winner of the final gaining 2014 AFC Cup participation.

Semi-finals
CW/L2	Kitchee	2
L4	Southern	0
L3	Tuen Mun	2
SW	Wofoo Tai Po	1

Final
CW/L2	Kitchee	3
L3	Tuen Mun	0

== Season statistics ==
=== Top scorers ===
Rank	Player	Club	Goals
1	(Hong Kong) Jaimes McKee	Sun Pegasus	16
2	(Nigeria) Alex Tayo Akande	Wofoo Tai Po	13
3	(Brazil) Giovane Silva	Biu Chun Rangers	11
3	(Brazil) Itaparica	South China	11
5	(Japan) Tsuyoshi Yoshitake	Yokohama FC HK	9
6	(Spain) Jonathan Carril	~~Kitchee~~; Southern	8
7	(Japan) Yuto Nakamura	Citizen	7
7	(Spain) Jordi Tarrés	Kitchee	7
7	(Spain) Pablo Couñago	Kitchee	7
7	(Guinea) Mamadou Barry	Sunray Cave JC Sun Hei	7
7	(Brazil) Daniel Goulart Quevedo	Tuen Mun	7
7	(Ghana) Christian Annan	Wofoo Tai Po	7

=== Hat-tricks ===
Player	For	Against	Result	Date
(Nigeria) Alex Tayo Akande	Wofoo Tai Po	Biu Chun Rangers	4–1	16 September 2012
(Brazil) Detinho	Citizen	Wofoo Tai Po	7–3	11 November 2012
(Japan) Yuto Nakamura	Citizen	Tuen Mun	5–0	29 March 2013
(Hong Kong) Jaimes McKee^{5}	Sun Pegasus	Biu Chun Rangers	8–2	4 May 2013

- ^{5} Player scored 5 goals in the match.

=== Scoring ===
- First goal of the season: Ng Wai Chiu for Sun Pegasus against Wofoo Tai Po (31 August 2012)
- Fastest goal of the season: 0 minute and 50 seconds, Ng Wai Chiu for Sun Pegasus against Wofoo Tai Po (31 August 2012)
- Widest winning margin: 6 goals
  - Biu Chun Rangers 2–8 Sun Pegasus (Week 18, 4 May 2013)
- Highest scoring game: 10 goals
  - Citizen 7–3 Wofoo Tai Po (Week 8, 11 November 2012)
  - Biu Chun Rangers 2–8 Sun Pegasus (Week 18, 4 May 2013)

=== Discipline ===
- Most yellow cards (player): 7
  - Eugene Mbome (Sun Pegasus)
  - Mauricio Correa Da Luz (Tuen Mun)
- Most yellow cards in a match (club): 6
  - South China (Week 4, South China 1–0 Kitchee)
- Most yellow cards in total (club): 46
  - Sun Pegasus
- Most red cards in a match (club): 2
  - Sunray Cave JC Sun Hei (Week 4, Sunray Cave JC Sun Hei 2–2 Biu Chun Rangers)
  - Yokohama FC Hong Kong (Week 5, Yokohama FC Hong Kong 1–4 Kitchee)
- Most red cards in total (club): 5
  - Yokohama FC Hong Kong

=== Clean Sheets ===
- Most clean sheets: 5
  - South China
  - Citizen
- Fewest clean sheets: 0
  - Biu Chun Rangers
  - Wofoo Tai Po

== Awards ==
=== Monthly awards ===
The monthly awards are organised by the Hong Kong Sports Press Association. 20 journalists who specialise in football in Hong Kong will vote their best player of the month. Player with the highest number of votes wins the award.

Year	Month	Winner	Club	Source
2012	September	(Hong Kong) Lee Chi Ho	South China	
2012	October	(Brazil) Detinho	Citizen	
2012	November	(Brazil) Detinho	Citizen	
2012	December	(Hong Kong) Lee Wai Lim	South China	
2013	January	(Hong Kong) Au Yeung Yiu Chung	South China	
2013	February	(Ghana) Christian Annan	Wofoo Tai Po	
2013	March	(Hong Kong) Zhang Chunhui	Sunray Cave JC Sun Hei	
2013	April	(Hong Kong) Li Haiqiang	Tuen Mun	
2013	May	(Spain) Jordi Tarrés	Kitchee	
