= Antony Sassi =

Italian footballer (born 1978)

Personal information
- Full name: Antony Robert Sassi
- Date of birth: 17 May 1978 (age 48)
- Position: Defender

Senior career*
| Years | Team | Apps | (Gls) |
| 2010–2011 | HKFC | 8 | (0) |
- * Club domestic league appearances and goals

Antony Robert Sassi (born 17 May 1978) is an Italian former professional footballer.

== Career statistics ==
=== Club ===
Appearances and goals by club, season and competition
| Club | Season | League | | | Cup | | League Cup | | Other | | Total | |
| Club | Season | Division | Apps | Goals | Apps | Goals | Apps | Goals | Apps | Goals | Apps | Goals |
|---|---|---|---|---|---|---|---|---|---|---|---|---|
| HKFC | 2010–11 | First Division | 8 | 0 | 0 | 0 | 0 | 0 | 1 (Note: Appearances in the Hong Kong Senior Shield) | 0 | 9 | 0 |
