= Wei Zhao (footballer) =

Hong Kong footballer

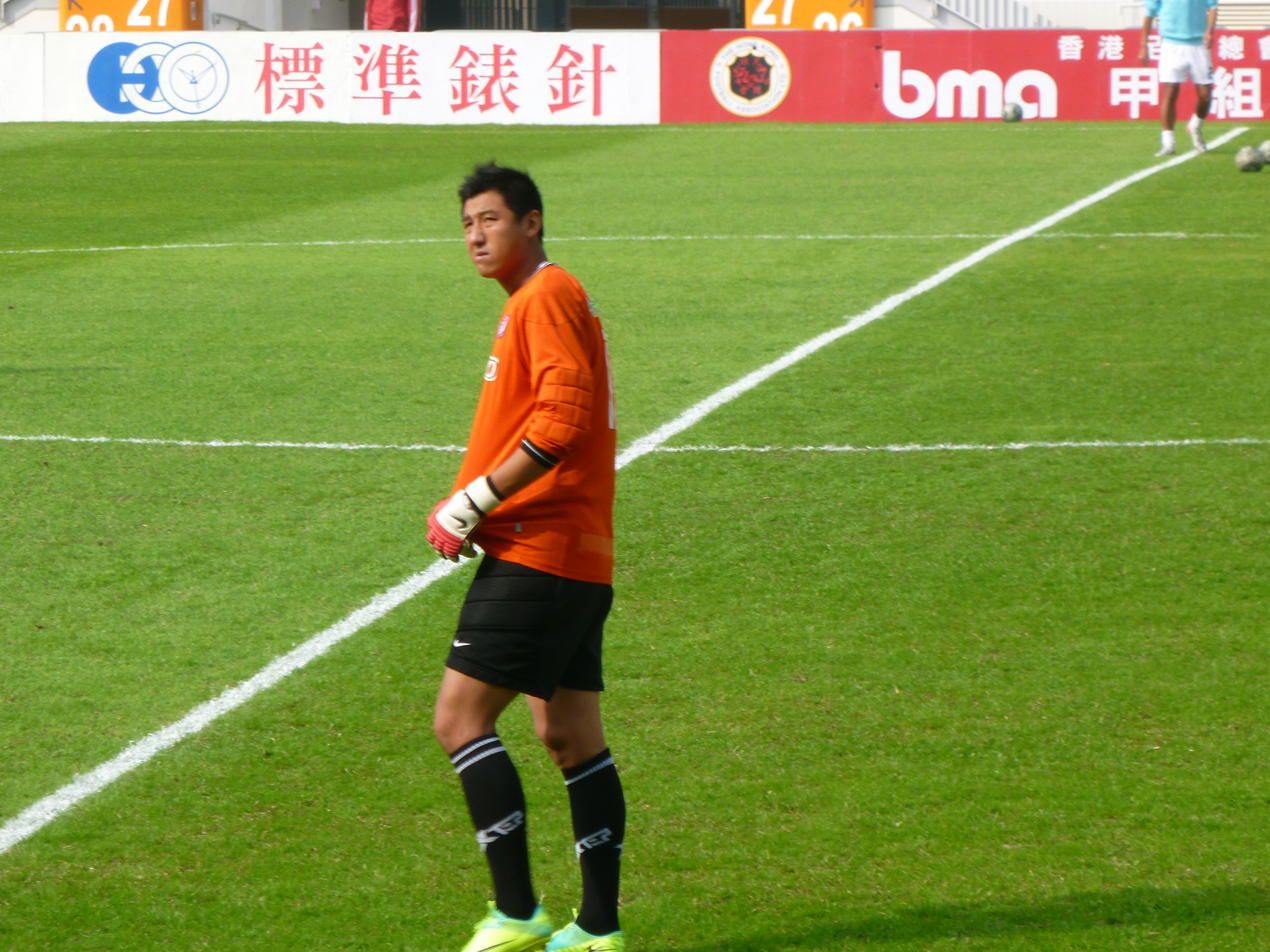

Personal information
- Full name: Wei Zhao
- Date of birth: 29 August 1983 (age 43)
- Place of birth: Tianjin, China
- Height: 1.93 m (6 ft 4 in)
- Position: Goalkeeper

Youth career
- –2003: Guangzhou Matsunichi

Senior career*
Years	Team	Apps	(Gls)
2002	Sunray Cave	19	(0)
2003–2006	Guangzhou Sunray Cave	1	(0)
2003–2004	→ Xiangxue Pharmaceutical (loan)	19	(0)
2004–2005	→ Sunray Cave (loan)	23	(0)
2005–2006	→ South China (loan)	9	(0)
2006–2007	Hong Kong Rangers	12	(0)
2007–2010	Sun Hei	48	(0)
2010–2011	Tuen Mun	15	(0)
2011–2012	Hong Kong Rangers	5	(0)
2012–2013	Tuen Mun	19	(0)
2014	Hong Kong Rangers	1	(0)

International career
2011	Hong Kong	1	(0)
- * Club domestic league appearances and goals as of 11 May 2014

Wei Zhao
- Traditional Chinese: 魏釗
- Simplified Chinese: 魏钊
Transcriptions
Standard Mandarin
- Hanyu Pinyin: Wèi Zhāo
- IPA: [wêɪ ʈʂáʊ]
Yue: Cantonese
- Jyutping: Wai6 Ciu1
- IPA: [wɐj˨ tsʰiw˥]

Wei Zhao (Chinese: 魏釗; born 29 August 1983) is a former professional footballer who played as a goalkeeper. Born in China, he represented Hong Kong internationally.

== International career ==
On 3 June 2011, Wei won his first and only cap for the Hong Kong in an international friendly match against Malaysia, where he conceded the equalizer from Abdul Hadi Yahya in the 66th minute of the game, which ended in a 1–1 draw.
