= Kwok Wing Sun =

Association football player

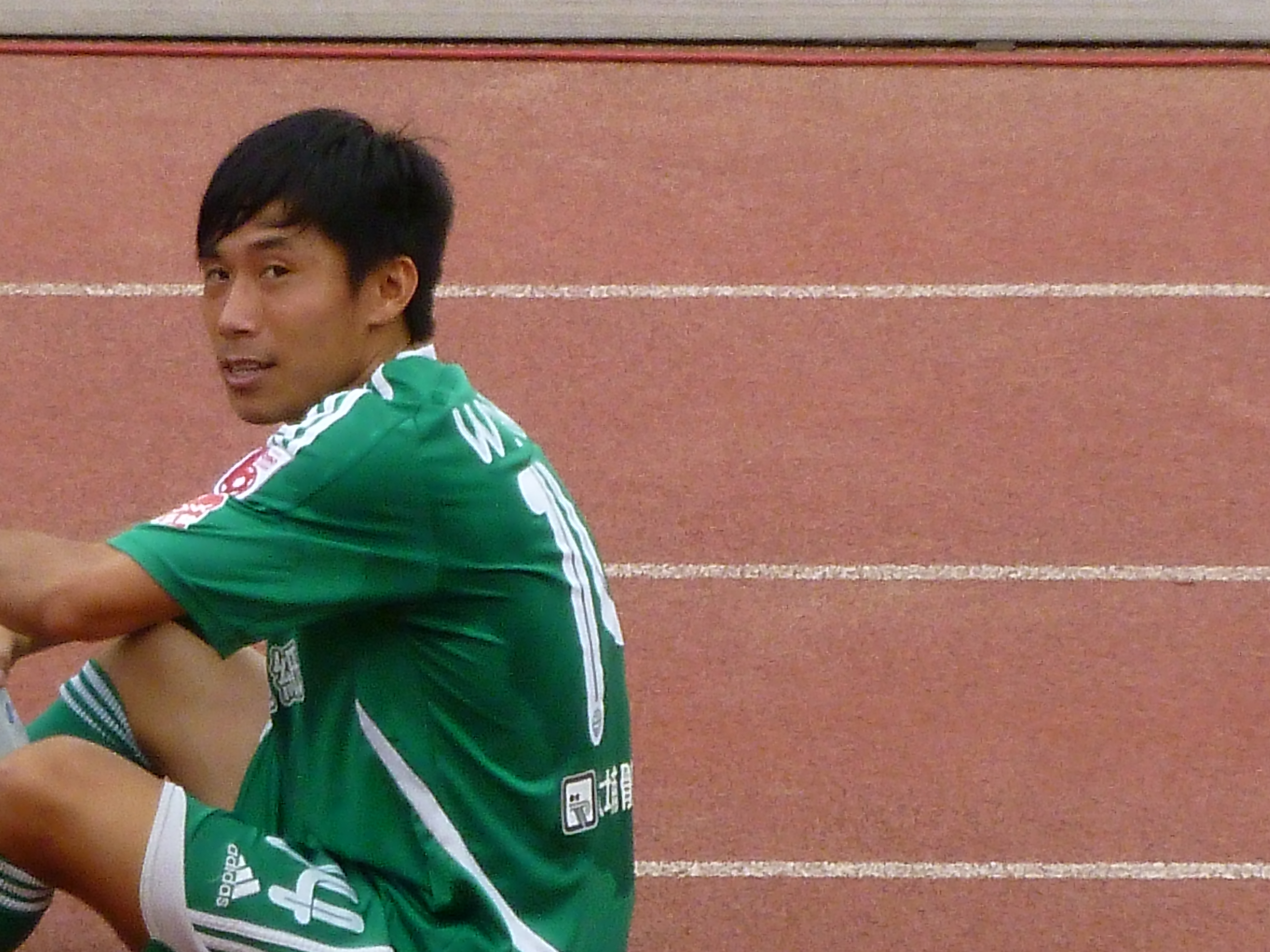

Personal information
- Date of birth: 11 September 1981 (age 45)
- Place of birth: Hong Kong
- Height: 1.68 m (5 ft 6 in)
- Position: Defender

Senior career*
Years	Team	Apps	(Gls)
- Biu Chun Rangers
2006–2012	Tai Po	105	(1)
2012–2013	Tuen Mun	16	(0)
2013–2017	Sun Hei	90	(18)
2017–2019	Double Flower	40	(6)
2019–20	Kowloon City	13	(6)
2021–24	3 Sing	44	(4)
2024–	Kui Tan	5	(0)
- * Club domestic league appearances and goals

Kwok Wing Sun (Chinese: 郭詠燊; born 11 September 1981) is a Hong Kong former footballer who played as a defender.

== Career ==
In 2006, Kwok signed for Hong Kong top flight side Tai Po, where he made over 49 league appearances and scored 1 goal, helping them win the 2008–09 Hong Kong FA Cup, their first major trophy. In 2017, he signed for Double Flower in the Hong Kong second tier. In 2019, Kwok signed for Hong Kong third tier club Kowloon City. In 2021, he signed for 3 Sing in the Hong Kong fourth tier.
