= Sashi Chalwe =

Zambian footballer (born 1983)

Personal information
- Full name: Sashi Triehimus Chalwe
- Date of birth: 16 February 1983 (age 43)
- Place of birth: Lusaka, Zambia
- Height: 1.77 m (5 ft 10 in)
- Position: Defender

Senior career*
Years	Team	Apps	(Gls)
2000–2002	Lusaka Dynamos	69	(5)
2002–2005	Mamelodi Sundowns	76	(5)
2005–2007	Bloemfontein Celtic	26	(0)
2007–2008	F.C. AK		
2009–2010	Lusaka Dynamos		
2011	Al Ahed	7	(0)
2012	NAPSA Stars		
2012–2013	Hong Kong Rangers	10	(0)
Total		188	(10)

International career
2002–2004	Zambia	9	(1)
- * Club domestic league appearances and goals

Sashi Triehimus Chalwe (born 16 February 1983) is a former Zambian footballer.

== Career statistics ==
=== Club ===
Club	Season	League			Cup		Continental		Total	
Club	Season	Division	Apps	Goals	Apps	Goals	Apps	Goals	Apps	Goals
Lusaka Dynamos	2000	Zambia Super League	17	0	0	0	0	0	17	0
Lusaka Dynamos	2001	Zambia Super League	27	2	0	0	0	0	27	2
Lusaka Dynamos	2002	Zambia Super League	25	3	0	0	0	0	25	3
Lusaka Dynamos	Total		69	5	0	0	0	0	69	5
Mamelodi Sundowns	2002–03	Premier Soccer League	29	2	0	0	0	0	29	2
Mamelodi Sundowns	2003–04	Premier Soccer League	29	1	0	0	0	0	29	1
Mamelodi Sundowns	2004–05	Premier Soccer League	18	2	0	0	0	0	18	2
Mamelodi Sundowns	Total		76	5	0	0	0	0	76	5
Bloemfontein Celtic	2005–06	Premier Soccer League	9	0	0	0	0	0	9	0
Bloemfontein Celtic	2006–07	Premier Soccer League	17	0	0	0	0	0	29	0
Bloemfontein Celtic	Total		26	0	0	0	0	0	26	0
Al Ahed	2010–11	Lebanese Premier League	7	0	0	0	7 (Note: Appearances in the AFC Cup)	0	7	0
BC Rangers	2012–13	Hong Kong First Division	10	0	1 (Note: Appearances in the Hong Kong FA Cup)	0	0	0	11	0
Career total			188	10	1	0	7	0	196	10

=== International ===
National team	Year	Apps	Goals
Zambia	2002	2	0
Zambia	2003	6	1
Zambia	2004	1	0
Total		9	1

=== International goals ===
Scores and results list Zambia's goal tally first.

No	Date	Venue	Opponent	Score	Result	Competition
1.	16 August 2003	Kamuzu Stadium, Blantyre, Malawi	Malawi	1–1	1–1 (4–2 pen)	2003 COSAFA Cup
