= Yip Tsz Chun =

Hong Kong footballer (born 1985)

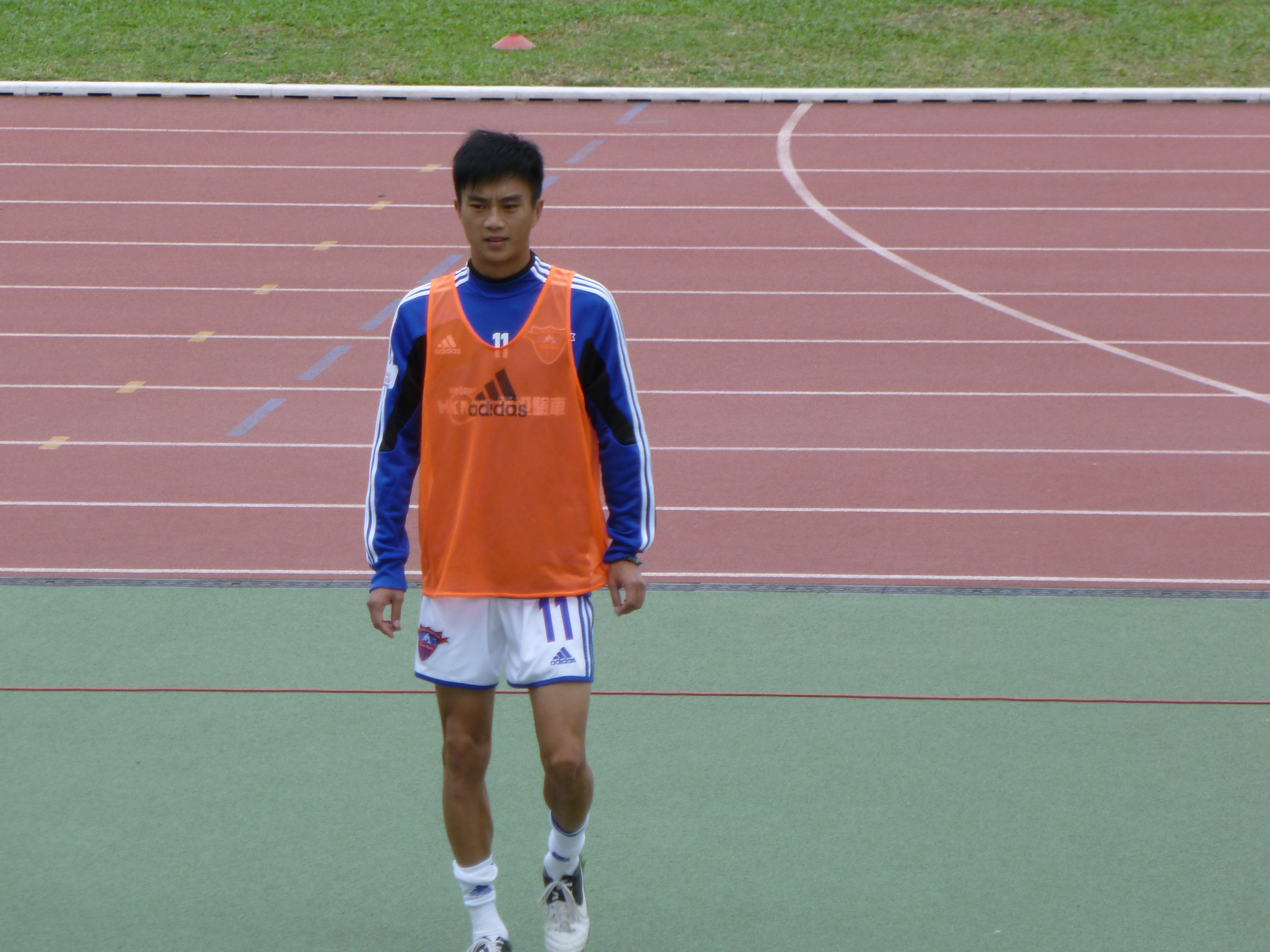

Personal information
- Full name: Yip Tsz Chun
- Date of birth: 15 May 1985 (age 41)
- Place of birth: Hong Kong
- Height: 1.76 m (5 ft 9 in)
- Positions: Striker; left winger

Team information
- Current team: Yuen Long (player-coach)

Youth career
- South China

Senior career*
| Years | Team | Apps | (Gls) |
| 2005–2006 | Kui Tan | 6 | (1) |
| 2006–2007 | Kwai Tsing | 8 | (3) |
| 2007–2008 | Eastern | 3 | (0) |
| 2008–2009 | Mutual | 16 | (2) |
| 2009–2010 | Pegasus | 0 | (0) |
| 2010–2011 | Tai Chung | 21 | (2) |
| 2011–2013 | Tuen Mun | 22 | (4) |
| 2014–2015 | Pegasus | 20 | (3) |
| 2015–2022 | Yuen Long | 48 | (10) |
| 2022–2023 | Yuen Long | 49 | (10) |
| 2026– | Yuen Long | 7 | (2) |

International career
| 2012 | Hong Kong | 3 | (0) |

Managerial career
- 2019–2020: Yuen Long (assistant coach)
- 2020–: Yuen Long
- * Club domestic league appearances and goals as of 16 May 2026

Yip Tsz Chun (Chinese: 葉子俊; Jyutping: jip^{6} zi^{2} zeon^{3}; born 15 May 1985 in Hong Kong) is a Hong Kong former professional footballer who currently plays for Hong Kong First Division club Yuen Long. He is also the head coach of the club.

Yip mainly plays as a striker but has also played as a left winger on many occasions. He was also a member of the Hong Kong national futsal team.

== Early years ==
Yip was born in Hong Kong. When he was young, he joined Hong Kong First Division team South China youth academy. However, after he finished the secondary studies, he was forced to stop his professional football career due to injuries. He only played in the Hong Kong Second Division League as a non-professional player.

== Club career ==
=== Eastern ===
In 2007, Eastern was invited to promote to the Hong Kong First Division League. Eastern's coach Casemiro Mior invited Yip to join the club. Miro was the coach of South China's youth team and Yip was one of his former player. Eastern was also Yip's first professional club.

=== Mutual ===
After a season with Eastern, due to insufficient chances, Yip, alongside 7 other former Eastern players, joined the newly promoted team Mutual in the 2008–09 season.

Although he played most of the matches for Mutual, Mutual could not avoid relegation to the Second Division after a season in the top-tier league.

=== Pegasus ===
Since he was living in Yuen Long District, Pegasus, a team based in the district, signed Yip at the beginning of the 2009–10 season.

However, Yip was not given any chances, whilst at the same time, Yip could not attend training sessions in the evening as he had to attend school courses. He was released by the team after only staying half season with the team.

=== Tai Chung ===
Yip joined another First Division club Tai Chung after being released by Pegasus.

He was one of the key players of the club, but the team could not avoid relegation from the First Division.

=== Tuen Mun ===
He signed a contract with Tuen Mun at the beginning of the 2011–12 season.

On 30 October 2012, due to the divestment of Tuen Mun president Chan Keung, various key players, including Yip, and the whole coaching team were released by the club.

=== Pegasus ===
He signed for Pegasus on 1 January 2014.

=== Yuen Long ===
In 2015, he returned to his home town and signed for Hong Kong Premier League club Yuen Long.

== International career ==
=== Hong Kong ===
After emerging as one of Tuen Mun's key players, Yip was called up to the senior squad. He played his first senior international match on 1 June 2012, an international friendly match against Singapore at Hong Kong Stadium.

== Honours ==
Yuen Long

- Hong Kong Senior Shield: 2017–18

== Career statistics ==
=== Club ===
As of 28 October 2012

| Club performance | | | League | | Cup | | | | League Cup | | Continental | | Total | |
| Season | Club | League | Apps | Goals | Apps | Goals | Apps | Goals | Apps | Goals | Apps | Goals | Apps | Goals |
| Hong Kong | | | League | | Junior Shield | | FA Cup | | League Cup | | AFC Cup | | Total | |
|---|---|---|---|---|---|---|---|---|---|---|---|---|---|---|
| 2005–06 | New Fair Kui Tan | Second division | 6 | 1 | 0 | 0 | N/A | N/A | N/A | N/A | N/A | N/A | 6 | 1 |
| New Fair Kui Tan Total | | | 6 | 1 | 0 | 0 | 0 | 0 | 0 | 0 | 0 | 0 | 6 | 1 |
| 2006–07 | Kwai Tsing | Second division | 8 | 3 | 0 | 0 | N/A | N/A | N/A | N/A | N/A | N/A | 8 | 3 |
| Kwai Tsing Total | | | 8 | 3 | 0 | 0 | 0 | 0 | 0 | 0 | 0 | 0 | 8 | 3 |
| Hong Kong | | | League | | Senior Shield | | FA Cup | | League Cup | | AFC Cup | | Total | |
| 2007–08 | Eastern | First Division | 3 | 0 | 0 | 0 | 0 | 0 | 0 | 0 | N/A | N/A | 3 | 0 |
| Eastern Total | | | 3 | 0 | 0 | 0 | 0 | 0 | 0 | 0 | 0 | 0 | 3 | 0 |
| 2008–09 | Mutual | First Division | 16 | 2 | 0 | 0 | 1 | 0 | 1 | 0 | N/A | N/A | 18 | 2 |
| Mutual Total | | | 16 | 2 | 0 | 0 | 1 | 0 | 1 | 0 | 0 | 0 | 18 | 2 |
| 2009–10 | TSW Pegasus | First Division | 0 | 0 | 0 | 0 | 0 | 0 | N/A | N/A | N/A | N/A | 0 | 0 |
| TSW Pegasus Total | | | 0 | 0 | 0 | 0 | 0 | 0 | 0 | 0 | 0 | 0 | 0 | 0 |
| 2009–10 | Tai Chung | First Division | 9 | 2 | 0 | 0 | 1 | 0 | N/A | N/A | N/A | N/A | 10 | 2 |
| 2010–11 | Tai Chung | First Division | 12 | 0 | 1 | 0 | 1 | 0 | 0 | 0 | N/A | N/A | 14 | 0 |
| Tai Chung Total | | | 21 | 2 | 1 | 0 | 2 | 0 | 0 | 0 | 0 | 0 | 24 | 2 |
| 2011–12 | Tuen Mun | First Division | 15 | 3 | 4 | 0 | 1 | 0 | 2 | 0 | N/A | N/A | 22 | 3 |
| 2012–13 | Tuen Mun | First Division | 7 | 1 | 0 | 0 | 0 | 0 | N/A | N/A | N/A | N/A | 7 | 1 |
| Tuen Mun Total | | | 22 | 4 | 4 | 0 | 1 | 0 | 2 | 0 | 0 | 0 | 29 | 4 |
| Hong Kong Total | | | 76 | 12 | 5 | 0 | 4 | 0 | 3 | 0 | 0 | 0 | 88 | 12 |
| Career Total | | | 76 | 12 | 5 | 0 | 4 | 0 | 3 | 0 | 0 | 0 | 88 | 12 |

=== International ===
| # | Date | Venue | Opponent | Home/away | Result | Scored | Captain | Competition |
|---|---|---|---|---|---|---|---|---|
| 1 | 1 June 2012 | Hong Kong Stadium, So Kon Po, Hong Kong | Singapore | H | 1–0 | 0 | | Friendly |
| 2 | 15 August 2012 | Jurong West Stadium, Jurong West, Singapore | Singapore | A | 0–2 | 0 | | Friendly |
| 3 | 16 October 2012 | Mong Kok Stadium, Mong Kok, Hong Kong | Malaysia | H | 0–3 | 0 | | Friendly |
