= Tuen Mun Tang Shiu Kin Sports Ground =

Sports ground in Tuen Mun, Hong Kong

Coordinates: 22°24′14″N 113°58′27″E

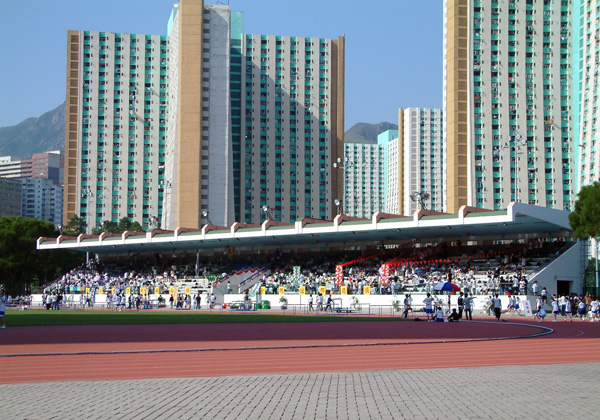
- Tuen Mun Tang Shiu Kin Sports Ground's main grandstand, background is Tai Hing Estate
- Interactive map of Tuen Mun Tang Shiu Kin Sports Ground
- Location: Tsing Chung Koon Road, Tuen Mun, Hong Kong
- Owner: Hong Kong Government
- Operator: Leisure and Cultural Services Department, Hong Kong
- Capacity: 2,200
- Surface: Grass
- Pitch size: 100 x 64 metres (110 x 70 yards)
- Public transit: Siu Hong station Ngan Wai

Construction
- Opened: 17 December 1981; 44 years ago

Tenants
- Tuen Mun (2010–2014); Rangers (2019–2020)

Tuen Mun Tang Shiu Kin Sports Ground (Traditional Chinese: 屯門鄧肇堅運動場, also known as Tuen Mun Tang Siu Kin Sports Ground) is a multi-use stadium in Hong Kong. It is operated by Leisure and Cultural Services Department of Hong Kong. It is currently the home of Hong Kong Premier League club Rangers.

It is named after the town Tuen Mun as well as Hong Kong businessman and philanthropist Tang Shiu-kin.

== History ==
=== 2010-11 Hong Kong First Division ===
The sports ground was used as the home ground for Tuen Mun in the 2010–11 season. This will was the second time the sports ground will be used for Hong Kong First Division games.

== Sports Ground Information ==
- Address: Tsing Chung Koon Road, Tuen Mun
- Facilities: 1 runway(400m), 1 grass football pitch
- Jogging hours: 6:30am to 10:30pm
- Maintenance day: every Monday
