= 2010–11 Hong Kong First Division League =

Hong Kong First Division
- Season: 2010–11
- Champions: Kitchee
- Relegated: HKFC; Tai Chung
- AFC Cup: Citizen; Kitchee
- Matches: 90
- Goals: 331 (3.68 per match)
- Top goalscorer: Makhosonke Bhengu; Jordi (12)
- Biggest home win: Kitchee 7–0 Tai Chung (1 May 2011)
- Biggest away win: HKFC 0–6 NT Realty Wofoo Tai Po (4 March 2011)
- Highest scoring: Sun Hei 4–5 Citizen (17 October 2010); Fourway Rangers 5–4 Tai Chung (29 January 2011); HKFC 2–7 Kitchee (6 May 2011)
- Longest winning run: 6 games Kitchee
- Longest unbeaten run: 8 games South China; Sun Hei
- Longest winless run: 13 games HKFC
- Longest losing run: 8 games Tai Chung
- Highest attendance: 9,098; South China 0–1 NT Realty Wofoo Tai Po (29 January 2011)
- Lowest attendance: 95; Tai Chung 4–2 HKFC (13 March 2011)
- Total attendance: 86,714
- Average attendance: 963

The 2010–11 Hong Kong First Division League (known as HKFA bma First Division League for sponsorship reasons) season was the 99th since its establishment. The 2010–11 Hong Kong First Division League is contested by 10 teams. The defending champions were South China. Hong Kong Football Club and Tuen Mun were promoted from the second division to take part.

== Teams ==
=== Teams summaries ===
==== Stadia ====
Citizen had to move away from its usual home ground, Mong Kok Stadium, due to renovations.

Team	Stadium	Stadium capacity
Citizen	Siu Sai Wan Sports Ground	12,000
Fourway Rangers	Sham Shui Po Sports Ground	2,000
HKFC	Hong Kong Football Club Stadium	2,750
Kitchee	Tseung Kwan O Sports Ground	3,500
NT Realty Wofoo Tai Po	Tai Po Sports Ground	3,500
South China	Hong Kong Stadium	40,000
Sun Hei	Tsing Yi Sports Ground	1,500
Tai Chung	Kowloon Bay Park	1,500
TSW Pegasus	Yuen Long Stadium	5,000
Tuen Mun	Tuen Mun Tang Shiu Kin Sports Ground	2,200

=== Managerial changes ===
Team	Outgoing	Date of vacancy	Incoming	Date of appointment
Sun Hei	Yan Lik Kin	Pre-season	José Ricardo Rambo	Pre-season
Tai Chung	Chan Ho Yin	Pre-season	Dejan Antonić	Pre-season
TSW Pegasus	José Ricardo Rambo	Pre-season	Chan Hiu Ming	Pre-season
Tuen Mun	Leung Sui Wing	Pre-season	Lo Kwong Chung	Pre-season
South China	Kim Pan-Gon	December 2010	Chan Ho Yin (caretaker)	December 2010

== League table ==
Pos	Team	Pld	W	D	L	GF	GA	GD	Pts	Qualification or relegation
1	Kitchee (C)	18	14	2	2	52	16	+36	44	2012 AFC Cup Group stage
2	South China	18	14	1	3	41	19	+22	43	
3	TSW Pegasus	18	10	1	7	40	28	+12	31	
4	Sun Hei	18	8	3	7	36	32	+4	27 (Note: WTP 0–0 SUN; SUN 1–0 WTP)	
5	NT Realty Wofoo Tai Po	18	8	3	7	37	21	+16	27	
6	Citizen	18	7	5	6	29	31	−2	26	2012 AFC Cup Group stage (Note: via 2010–11 Hong Kong Senior Challenge Shield)
7	Fourway	18	7	4	7	41	36	+5	25	
8	Tuen Mun	18	5	3	10	16	30	−14	18	
9	Tai Chung (R)	18	3	2	13	19	49	−30	11	Relegation to Second Division
10	HKFC (R)	18	1	2	15	20	69	−49	5	Relegation to Second Division

Updated to match(es) played on 23 May 2011. Source: Hong Kong Football Association
Rules for classification: 1) points; 2) head-to-head points; 3) head-to-head goal difference; 4) head-to-head goals scored; 5) goal difference; 6) number of goals scored.
(C) Champions; (R) Relegated

== Results ==
Home \ Away	CIT	RAN	CLU	KIT	WTP	SCA	SUN	TAI	TSW	TMN
Citizen		1–1	4–1	1–1	1–0	1–2	2–2	3–1	0–4	0–0
Fourway	5–2		7–1	0–2	0–5	1–3	5–2	5–4	1–2	3–1
HKFC	1–3	2–4		2–7	0–6	1–4	0–3	2–2	2–6	2–1
Kitchee	3–1	2–1	6–0		2–1	2–0	3–1	7–0	1–4	3–0
NT Realty Wofoo Tai Po	2–3	2–2	1–1	0–3		1–2	0–0	3–1	4–3	7–1
South China	2–0	2–1	2–1	3–4	0–1		2–1	4–0	2–1	0–0
Sun Hei	4–5	0–0	3–1	0–4	1–0	1–3		3–0	4–3	2–1
Tai Chung	0–1	2–2	4–2	1–0	1–0	1–6	0–4		0–1	1–3
TSW Pegasus	1–0	2–3	5–1	0–0	0–1	2–3	0–4	2–1		2–1
Tuen Mun	1–1	1–0	1–0	1–2	1–2	0–1	3–1	1–0	0–2	

Updated to match(es) played on 21 May 2011. Source: http://www.hkfa.com
Legend: Blue = home team win; Yellow = draw; Red = away team win.
- All times are Hong Kong Time (UTC+8).

== Top scorers ==
As the match played on 6 May 2011.

Rank	Scorer	Club	Goals
1	Jordi Tarrés	Kitchee	12
1	Makhosonke Bhengu	Fourway Rangers	12
3	Itaparica	TSW Pegasus	11
4	Cahê	Sun Hei	10
4	Leandro Carrijó	South China/TSW Pegasus	10
6	Godfred Karikari	TSW Pegasus	9
6	Beto	Fourway Rangers	9
8	Roberto Losada	Kitchee	8
9	Lam Ka Wai	Kitchee	7
10	Mamadou Barry	Sun Hei	6
10	Edson Minga	Fourway Rangers	6

== Home ground allocation ==
Locations of the Hong Kong First Division League 2009–10 venues

This season will be the first time in Hong Kong First Division League history that all 10 First Division clubs will be allocated their own sports ground for home games, without having to share with another club. Tseung Kwan O Sports Ground will be used for the league for the first time as Kitchee's home ground.

- South China – Hong Kong Stadium (Capacity:40,000)
- Kitchee – Tseung Kwan O Sports Ground (Capacity:3,500)
- TSW Pegasus – Yuen Long Stadium (Capacity:5,000)
- Sun Hei – Tsing Yi Sports Ground (Capacity:1,500)
- Tai Po – Tai Po Sports Ground (Capacity:3,500)
- Citizen – Siu Sai Wan Sports Ground (Capacity:12,000)
- Fourway Athletics – Sham Shui Po Sports Ground (Capacity:2,000)
- Tai Chung – Kowloon Bay Park (Capacity:1,500)
- HKFC – Hong Kong Football Club Stadium (Capacity:2,750)
- Tuen Mun – Tuen Mun Tang Shiu Kin Sports Ground (Capacity:2,200)

== Double entertainment ==
Double entertainment is a term meaning two clubs will play their home games on the same ground one after the other, to attract more fans and save costs. Although both Sun Hei SC and Fourway Athletics would like to see the return of double entertainment, South China, Kitchee, Pegasus and Tai Chung are against it, while Tuen Mun's home ground do not have enough changing rooms to accommodate 4 teams. In the HKFA's published calendar, no double entertainment are listed.
