= Tuen Mun SA =

Football club in Hong Kong

Tuen Mun
- Full name: Tuen Mun Sports Association
- Nickname: The Dolphins
- Founded: 1963; 63 years ago
- Ground: Siu Lun Sports Ground
- President: Lau Wong Fat
- Head coach: Cheng Ting Chi
- League: Hong Kong Second Division
- 2025–26: Second Division, 14th of 16
- Website: Website
Home colours	Away colours

Tuen Mun Sports Association (Chinese: 屯門體育會; also known as Tuen Mun) is a Hong Kong football club which currently competes in the Hong Kong Second Division. It is run by the Tuen Mun District Council.

The club plays its home matches at Siu Lun Sports Ground.

== History ==
Tuen Mun won the runners-up of the Hong Kong Second Division in the season 2009–10 and qualified for promotion to the Hong Kong First Division for the first time in the 2010–11 season. The club spent a couple of years at the top flight before spending a year on hiatus in 2013–14. They later rejoined the second tier of the Hong Kong football pyramid in 2014–15.

=== 2012–13 season ===
After gaining two season's experiences in the First Division, Tuen Mun played with an impressive start in the season 2012–13. After the sixth round, they climbed to third in the league table. On 30 October 2012, Tuen Mun spokesperson told to media that the club was facing financial problems because of the divestment of president Chan Keung. Various key players including Li Haiqiang, Yip Tsz Chun, Ling Cong and all 4 foreign players, as well as the whole coaching team, were proposed to be released by the club. Two weeks later, the board of Tuen Mun announced that the financial problem of the club had been solved. As a result, all players and coaches remained with the club. Tuen Mun finished third in the 2012–13 season.

== Ground ==
The club plays most of its home matches at Wu Shan Recreation Playground and Siu Lun Sports Ground.

== Honours ==
=== League ===
- Hong Kong Third Division
  - Champions (1): 2008–09
- Hong Kong Third District Division
  - Champions (1): 2004–05
