= 2013–14 Tai Po FC season =

Wofoo Tai Po
2013–14 season
- Chief President: Cheung Hok Ming
- Head Coach: Vacant
- Home Ground: Tai Po Sports Ground (Capacity: 3,000)
- Second Division: 11th (alphabetically)
- Junior Shield: TBD
Home colours	Away colours

The 2013–14 season is Wofoo Tai Po's 3rd season in the Hong Kong Second Division League, as well as the 11th season in the Hong Kong football. This season is also Wofoo Tai Po's first season after their relegation from the top-tier division in the 2012–13 season. Wofoo Tai Po will compete in the Second Division League and Junior Challenge Shield in this season.

== Key events ==
- 9 May 2013: The club confirmed that head coach Cheung Po Chun leaves the club after spending four seasons with them.
- 30 May 2013: Hong Kong midfielder To Hon To leaves the club and joins First Division club Kitchee for free.
- 31 May 2013: Brazilian midfielder Aender Naves Mesquita leaves the club and joins First Division club South China for free.
- 1 June 2013: Chinese-born Hong Kong midfielder Jing Teng leaves the club and joins First Division club Sunray Cave JC Sun Hei for free.
- 2 June 2013: Hong Kong goalkeeper Li Hon Ho leaves the club and joins newly promoted First Division club Eastern Salon for free.
- 2 June 2013: Brazilian defender Clayton Michel Afonso leaves the club and joins newly promoted First Division club Eastern Salon for free.
- 7 June 2013: Hong Kong defender Li Shu Yeung leaves the club and joins First Division club Yokohama FC Hong Kong for free.
- 8 June 2013: Hong Kong goalkeeper Pang Tsz Kin leaves the club and joins newly promoted First Division club Happy Valley for free.
- 8 June 2013: Hong Kong midfielder Wong Yim Kwan leaves the club and joins newly promoted First Division club Happy Valley for free.
- 9 June 2013: Nigerian striker Alex Tayo Akande leaves the club and joins First Division club Kitchee for free.
- 9 June 2013: Ghanaian striker Christian Annan leaves the club and joins First Division club Kitchee for free.
- 21 June 2013: Chinese-born Hong Kong midfielder Che Runqiu leaves the club and joins First Division club Southern for free.

== Players ==
=== Squad information ===
N	P	Nat.	Name	Date of birth	Age	Since	Previous club	Notes
1	GK	(Hong Kong)	Chan Ka Ki^{LP}	25 April 1979	35	2012	(Hong Kong) Sham Shui Po	
2	DF	(Hong Kong)	Shek Tsz Fung^{LP}	10 June 1993	20	2012	Youth system	
3	DF	(Hong Kong)	Chan Sze Wing^{LP}	23 March 1983	31	2004	(Hong Kong) South China	
6	DF	(Hong Kong)	Chen Jingde^{LP}	26 January 1990	24	2010	Youth system	
9	FW	(Hong Kong)	Chen Liming^{LP}	20 April 1987	27	2009	(China) Panyu Pearl	Second nationality: China
10	DF	(Hong Kong)	Lui Chi Hing^{LP}	10 January 1984	30	2004	(Hong Kong) Tai Po St. Joseph's	Team captain
17	FW	(Nigeria)	Caleb Ekwegwo^{LP}	1 August 1988	25	2013 (Winter)	Free agent	
20	MF	(Hong Kong)	Lee Ka Chun^{LP}	29 September 1993	20	2012	Youth system	
21	DF	(Hong Kong)	Chan Yuk Chi^{LP}	8 September 1984	29	2004	(Hong Kong) Tai Po St. Joseph's	Team vice captain
22	DF	(Hong Kong)	Fan Ka Long^{LP}	8 October 1993	20	2011	Youth system	
23	FW	(Hong Kong)	Ye Jia^{LP}	1 December 1981	32	2007	(Hong Kong) Rangers	Second nationality: China
	GK	(Hong Kong)	Liang Yuhao^{LP}			2013	(Hong Kong) South China	
	MF	(Hong Kong)	Sin Shing Chun^{LP}	29 December 1988	25	2013	(Hong Kong) Fu Moon	
	MF	(Hong Kong)	Wong Tak Ho^{LP}	5 November 1988	25	2013	(Hong Kong) Eastern District	
	MF	(Hong Kong)	So Hong Shing^{LP}	7 November 1980	33	2013	(Hong Kong) Happy Valley	
	MF	(Hong Kong)	So Ka Lok^{LP}			2013		
	MF	(Hong Kong)	Sze Kin Wai^{LP}	6 December 1984	30	2013	Free agent	

Last update: 31 July 2013
Source: Tai Po FC
Ordered by squad number.
^{LP}Local player; ^{FP}Foreign player; ^{NR}Non-registered player

=== Transfers ===
==== In ====
#	Position	Player	Transferred from	Fee	Date	Team	Source

==== Out ====
#	Position	Player	Transferred to	Fee	Date	Team	Source
13	MF	(Hong Kong) To Hon To	(Hong Kong) Kitchee	Free transfer	30 May 2013	First team	
7	MF	(Brazil) Aender Naves Mesquita	(Hong Kong) South China	Free transfer	31 May 2013	First team	
26	MF	(Hong Kong) Jing Teng	(Hong Kong) Sunray Cave JC Sun Hei	Free transfer	1 June 2013	First team	
1	GK	(Hong Kong) Li Hon Ho	(Hong Kong) Eastern Salon	Free transfer	2 June 2013	First team	
5	DF	(Brazil) Clayton Michel Afonso	(Hong Kong) Eastern Salon	Free transfer	2 June 2013	First team	
19	DF	(Hong Kong) Li Shu Yeung	Yokohama FC Hong Kong	Free transfer	7 June 2013	First team	
33	GK	(Hong Kong) Pang Tsz Kin	(Hong Kong) Happy Valley	Free transfer	8 June 2013	First team	
18	MF	(Hong Kong) Wong Yim Kwan	(Hong Kong) Happy Valley	Free transfer	8 June 2013	First team	
8	FW	(Nigeria) Alex Tayo Akande	(Hong Kong) Kitchee	Free transfer	9 June 2013	First team	
15	FW	(Ghana) Christian Annan	(Hong Kong) Kitchee	Free transfer	9 June 2013	First team	
25	MF	(Hong Kong) Che Runqiu	(Hong Kong) Southern	Free transfer	21 June 2013	First team	

==== Loan In ====
#	Position	Player	Loaned from	Date	Loan expires	Team	Source

==== Loan out ====
#	Position	Player	Loaned to	Date	Loan expires	Team	Source

== Squad statistics ==
=== Overall Stats ===
	Second Division	Junior Shield	Total Stats
Games played	0	0	0
Games won	0	0	0
Games drawn	0	0	0
Games lost	0	0	0
Goals for	0	0	0
Goals against	0	0	0
Players used	0	0	0^{1}
Yellow cards	0	0	0
Red cards	0	0	0

Last updated: 28 May 2013
Source: Player Stats

Players Used: Wofoo Tai Po have used a total of 0 different players in all competitions.

=== Top scorers ===
Place	Position	Nationality	Number	Name	Second Division	Junior Shield	Total
TOTALS					0	0	0

=== Disciplinary record ===
Number	Nationality	Position	Name	Second Division		Junior Shield		Total	
Number	Nationality	Position	Name	Booked	Sent off (straight red)	Booked	Sent off (straight red)	Booked	Sent off (straight red)
TOTALS				0	0	0	0	0	0

=== Starting 11 ===
This will show the most used players in each position, based on Wofoo Tai Po's typical starting formation once the season commences.

=== Captains ===
No.	P	Name	Country	No. games	Notes

Last updated: (Once the season commences)
Source: Competitive match reports.
Competitive matches only
Matches started as captain only
Country: FIFA nationality; No.: Squad number; P: Position; Name: Player name; No. Games: Number of games started as captain.

== Competitions ==
=== Overall ===
Competition	Started round	Current position / round	Final position / round	First match	Last match
Hong Kong Second Division League	—	11th		September 2013	
Junior Challenge Shield	2nd Round	—		December 2013	

Updated to match played 28 May 2013
Source: Competitions

=== Second Division League ===
==== Classification ====
Pos	Team	Pld	W	D	L	GF	GA	GD	Pts	Promotion or relegation
1	Wofoo Tai Po	22	17	5	0	67	11	+56	56	Promotion to Premier League
2	Wong Tai Sin	22	17	3	2	56	12	+44	54	Promotion to Premier League
3	Hong Kong FC	22	16	3	3	68	19	+49	51	
4	Shatin	22	13	5	4	54	23	+31	44	
5	Double Flower	22	10	4	8	56	36	+20	34	

Updated to match(es) played on 10 May 2014. Source: Hong Kong Football Association
Rules for classification: 1) points; 2) head-to-head points; 3) head-to-head goal difference; 4) head-to-head goals scored; 5) goal difference; 6) number of goals scored.

==== Results summary ====
Overall								Home						Away					
Pld	W	D	L	GF	GA	GD	Pts	W	D	L	GF	GA	GD	W	D	L	GF	GA	GD
0	0	0	0	0	0	0	0	0	0	0	0	0	0	0	0	0	0	0	0

Last updated: 28 May 2013.
Source: Second Division

==== Results by round ====
Round	1	2	3	4	5	6	7	8	9	10	11	12	13	14	15	16	17	18	19	20	21	22
Ground																						
Result																						
Position																						

Updated to match(es) played on 28 May 2013. Source: Competitive Matches
A = Away; H = Home; W = Win; D = Draw; L = Loss

== Matches ==
Win Draw Loss Void

=== Pre-season friendlies ===
30 July 2013	Yuen Long (Hong Kong)	4 – 1	(Hong Kong) Wofoo Tai Po	Tuen Mun, New Territories
20:00 UTC+8	Sandro; Yuen Lap Cheung; Souza; Chow Ki		Ye Jia	Stadium: Wu Shan Recreation Playground

7 August 2013	Wofoo Tai Po (Hong Kong)	1 – 1	(Hong Kong) South China	Tai Po, New Territories
20:00 UTC+8	Chen Liming 76'		59' Kwok Kin Pong	Stadium: Kwong Fuk Park

14 August 2013	Wofoo Tai Po (Hong Kong)	–	(Hong Kong) Sun Source	Tai Po, New Territories
20:00 UTC+8				Stadium: Kwong Fuk Park

16 August 2013	Wofoo Tai Po (Hong Kong)	–	(Hong Kong) Sham Shui Po	Tai Po, New Territories
21:30 UTC+8				Stadium: Kwong Fuk Park

19 August 2013	Wofoo Tai Po (Hong Kong)	–	(Hong Kong) Yuen Long	Tai Po, New Territories
20:00 UTC+8				Stadium: Kwong Fuk Park

20 August 2013	Sham Shui Po (Hong Kong)	–	(Hong Kong) Wofoo Tai Po	Sham Shui Po, Kowloon
21:30 UTC+8				Stadium: Sham Shui Po Sports Ground

26 August 2013	Wofoo Tai Po (Hong Kong)	–	(Hong Kong) Wing Yee	Tai Po, New Territories
20:00 UTC+8				Stadium: Kwong Fuk Park

30 August 2013	Wofoo Tai Po (Hong Kong)	–	(Hong Kong) Wong Tai Sin	Tai Po, New Territories
21:30 UTC+8				Stadium: Kwong Fuk Park
