= 2012–13 Tai Po FC season =

Wofoo Tai Po
2012–13 season
- Head Coach: Cheung Po Chun
- Home ground: Tai Po Sports Ground
- First Division: 10th (Relegated)
- Senior Shield: Winner
- FA Cup: Semi-finals
- Top goalscorer: League: Alex Tayo Akande (13); All: Alex Tayo Akande (18)
- Highest home attendance: 1,723 (7 October vs South China, First Division)
- Lowest home attendance: 273 (26 December vs Southern, FA Cup)
- Average home league attendance: 762 (in all competitions)
Home colours	Away colours

The 2012–13 season is Wofoo Tai Po's 7th season in the Hong Kong First Division League. Wofoo Tai Po will seek to win their first trophy for 3 seasons, competing in the Hong Kong First Division League, the Senior Challenge Shield and the FA Cup.

== Key Events ==
- 6 July 2012: Manager Cheung Po Chun announced that Naves Mesquita Aender and Alex Tayo Akande join the team from Sham Shui Po and Hong Kong Sapling respectively.
- 6 January 2013: Wofoo Tai Po made a comeback from 0–1 down to defeat Southern 3–1 in aggregate in the semi-finals of Senior Shield and reach the final of the tournament for the first time in club history.
- 12 January 2013: Nigerian forward Caleb Ekwegwo re-joins the club as a free transfer. Caleb represented the club for 15 times and scored 9 times during his time at the club in 2009.
- 27 January 2013: Wofoo Tai Po defeated Citizen 5–3 in penalties after a 2–2 tie after 90 minutes and extra time against Citizen and win the champions of Senior Shield. They are guaranteed a place in the 2013 Hong Kong AFC Cup play-offs.
- 4 May 2013: Wofoo Tai Po failed to stay in the top-tier division as Yokohama FC Hong Kong's Kenji Fukuda scored in the stoppage time of the match, sending Tai Po into the Second Division.
- 18 May 2013: Wofoo Tai Po finished the season with a narrow defeat against Tuen Mun in the 2013 Hong Kong AFC Cup play-offs semi-finals.

== Players ==
=== First team ===
As of 27 January 2013.

Note: Flags indicate national team as defined under FIFA eligibility rules; some limited exceptions apply. Players may hold more than one non-FIFA nationality.

No.	Pos.	Nation	Player
1	GK	(Hong Kong) HKG	Li Hon Ho
2	DF	(Hong Kong) HKG	Shek Tsz Fung
3	DF	(Hong Kong) HKG	Chan Sze Wing
5	DF	(Brazil) BRA	Clayton Michel Afonso^{FP}
6	DF	(Hong Kong) HKG	Chen Jingde
7	MF	(Brazil) BRA	Aender Naves Mesquita^{FP}
8	FW	(Nigeria) NGA	Alex Tayo Akande^{FP}
9	FW	(Hong Kong) HKG	Chen Liming
10	MF	(Hong Kong) HKG	Lui Chi Hing (1st vice-captain)
13	MF	(Hong Kong) HKG	To Hon To
15	FW	(Ghana) GHA	Christian Annan (2nd vice-captain)

No.	Pos.	Nation	Player
17	FW	(Nigeria) NGA	Caleb Ekwegwo^{FP}
18	DF	(Hong Kong) HKG	Wong Yim Kwan
19	DF	(Hong Kong) HKG	Li Shu Yeung
20	MF	(Hong Kong) HKG	Lee Ka Chun
21	DF	(Hong Kong) HKG	Chan Yuk Chi (captain)
22	DF	(Hong Kong) HKG	Fan Ka Long
23	FW	(Hong Kong) HKG	Ye Jia
25	MF	(Hong Kong) HKG	Che Run Qiu
26	MF	(Hong Kong) HKG	Jing Teng
33	GK	(Hong Kong) HKG	Pang Tsz Kin

Remarks:
^{FP} These players are registered as foreign players.

Players with dual nationalities:

- (Ghana) (Hong Kong) Christian Annan (Local player)
- (China) Chen Liming (Local player, eligible to play for Hong Kong national football team)
- (China) Ye Jia (Local Player, eligible to play for Hong Kong national football team)
- (China) Che Run Qiu (Local player, eligible to play for Hong Kong national football team)
- (China) Jing Teng (Local player, eligible to play for Hong Kong national football team)

=== Transfers ===
==== In ====
Squad #	Position	Player	Transferred from	Fee	Date	Team	Source
2	DF	(Hong Kong) Shek Tsz Fung	Reserves	N/A	N/A	First Team	
7	MF	(Brazil) Naves Mesquita Aender	Sham Shui Po	Undisclosed	6 July 2012	First Team	
8	FW	(Nigeria) Alex Tayo Akande	Hong Kong Sapling	Undisclosed	6 July 2012	First Team	
18	MF	(Hong Kong) Wong Yim Kwan	Hong Kong Sapling	Loan return	6 July 2012	First Team	
19	DF	(Hong Kong) Li Shu Yeung	Hong Kong Sapling	Undisclosed	6 July 2012	First Team	
20	MF	(Hong Kong) Lee Ka Chun	Youth team	N/A	N/A	First Team	

==== Out ====
Squad #	Position	Player	Transferred to	Fee	Date	Source
20	DF	(Hong Kong) Cheung Chi Yung	Sunray Cave JC Sun Hei	Undisclosed	25 May 2012	
13	MF	(Brazil) Ricardo Júnior	End of contract		6 July 2012	
7	FW	(Brazil) William Carlos Gomes	End of contract		6 July 2012	
11	MF	(Hong Kong) Sze Kin Wai	Retired		8 July 2012	
1	GK	(Hong Kong) Chiu Yu Ming	Southern	Undisclosed	21 July 2012	
14	DF	(Hong Kong) Kwok Wing Sun	Tuen Mun	Undisclosed	24 July 2012	
8	MF	(Hong Kong) Li Chun Yip	Happy Valley	Undisclosed		

== Stats ==
=== Squad Stats ===
				Total				Hong Kong First Division League		Senior Challenge Shield		FA Cup		HKAFC		
N	Pos.	Name	Nat.	GS	App	Gls	Min	App	Gls	App	Gls	App	Gls	App	Gls	Notes
1	GK	Li Hon Ho	(Hong Kong)	26	26	-51	2310	18	-43	7	-7	1	-1			(−) GA
33	GK	Pang Tsz Kin	(Hong Kong)	6	7	-7	598	1	-1			5	-4	1	-2	(−) GA
2	DF	Shek Tsz Fung	(Hong Kong)		1		10					1				
3	LB	Chan Sze Wing	(Hong Kong)	28	30		2518	16		7		6		1		
5	CB	Clayton Michel Afonso	(Brazil)	30	30	4	2716	17	1	7	3	5		1		
6	RB	Chen Jingde	(Hong Kong)	1	5		121	3		1		1				
19	RB	Li Shu Yeung	(Hong Kong)	28	31	1	2483	17	1	7		6		1		
21	CB	Chan Yuk Chi	(Hong Kong)	14	19		1149	10		3		5		1		
22	LB	Fan Ka Long	(Hong Kong)		2		19	1				1				
7	DM	Aender Naves Mesquita	(Brazil)	30	30	7	2684	18	4	7	2	4		1	1	
10	CM	Lui Chi Hing	(Hong Kong)	27	29	1	2471	16	1	7		5		1		
13	RM	To Hon To	(Hong Kong)	28	32	4	2446	18	2	7	2	6		1		
18	RM	Wong Yim Kwan	(Hong Kong)	7	15		482	8		5		2				
20	MF	Lee Ka Chun	(Hong Kong)		5		28	4		1						
25	LM	Che Run Qiu	(Hong Kong)	15	29		1485	18		5		5		1		
26	DM	Jing Teng	(Hong Kong)	22	27		1816	15		6		5		1		
8	FW	Alex Tayo Akande	(Nigeria)	27	29	19	2468	17	13	7	5	5	1			
9	FW	Chen Liming	(Hong Kong)	7	25	1	860	13	1	5		6		1		
15	FW	Christian Annan	(Ghana)	28	29	13	2504	17	6	6	1	5	6	1		
17	FW	Caleb Ekwegwo	(Nigeria)	1	10	1	213	5	1	1		3		1		Joined in January 2013
23	FW	Ye Jia	(Hong Kong)	28	29	3	2423	15	2	7	1	6		1		

Last updated: 18 May 2013
Ordered by Position
0 shown as blank

=== Top scorers ===
As of 18 May 2013

Place	Position	Nationality	Number	Name	First Division League	Senior Challenge Shield	FA Cup	AFC Cup Play-offs	Total
1	FW	(Nigeria)	8	Alex Tayo Akande	13	5	1	0	19
2	FW	(Ghana)	15	Christian Annan	7	1	6	0	14
3	MF	(Brazil)	7	Naves Mesquita Aender	4	2	0	1	7
=4	DF	(Brazil)	5	Clayton Michel Afonso	1	3	0	0	4
=4	MF	(Hong Kong)	13	To Hon To	2	2	0	0	4
6	FW	(Hong Kong)	23	Ye Jia	2	1	0	0	3
=7	FW	(Hong Kong)	9	Chen Liming	1	0	0	0	1
=7	MF	(Hong Kong)	10	Lui Chi Hing	1	0	0	0	1
=7	FW	(Nigeria)	17	Caleb Ekwegwo	1	0	0	0	1
=7	DF	(Hong Kong)	19	Li Shu Yeung	1	0	0	0	1
Own goal					1	0	0	0	1
TOTALS					33	14	7	1	55

=== Disciplinary record ===
As of 18 May 2013

Number	Nationality	Position	Name	First Division League		Senior Challenge Shield		FA Cup		AFC Cup Play-offs		Total	
Number	Nationality	Position	Name	Booked	Sent off (straight red)	Booked	Sent off (straight red)	Booked	Sent off (straight red)	Booked	Sent off (straight red)	Booked	Sent off (straight red)
1	(Hong Kong)	GK	Li Hon Ho	1	1	1	0	0	0	0	0	2	1
3	(Hong Kong)	DF	Chan Sze Wing	1	0	1	0	0	0	0	0	2	0
5	(Brazil)	DF	Clayton Michel Afonso	5	0	2	0	1	0	0	0	8	0
7	(Brazil)	MF	Naves Mesquita Aender	4	0	2	0	0	0	0	0	6	0
8	(Nigeria)	FW	Alex Tayo Akande	2	1	1	0	1	0	0	0	4	1
9	(Hong Kong)	FW	Chen Liming	1	0	0	0	0	0	0	0	1	0
10	(Hong Kong)	MF	Lui Chi Hing	2	0	3	0	1	0	0	0	6	0
13	(Hong Kong)	MF	To Hon To	1	0	2	0	0	0	0	0	3	0
15	(Ghana) (Hong Kong)	FW	Christian Annan	2	1	2	0	0	0	0	0	4	1
18	(Hong Kong)	MF	Wong Yim Kwan	1	0	1	0	0	0	0	0	2	0
19	(Hong Kong)	DF	Li Shu Yeung	3	1	0	0	0	0	1	0	4	1
23	(Hong Kong)	FW	Ye Jia	0	0	0	0	1	0	1	0	2	0
25	(Hong Kong)	MF	Che Run Qiu	2	0	0	0	0	0	0	0	2	0
26	(Hong Kong)	MF	Jing Teng	0	1	1	0	0	0	0	0	1	1
TOTALS				25	5	16	0	4	0	2	0	47	5

== Competitions ==
=== Overall ===
Competition	Started round	Final position / round	First match	Last match
Hong Kong First Division League	—	10th	31 August 2012	4 May 2013
Senior Challenge Shield	1st round	Winner	23 September 2012	27 January 2013
FA Cup	1st round	Semi-finals	26 December 2012	27 April 2013
Hong Kong AFC Cup play-offs	Semi-finals	Semi-finals	18 May 2013	18 May 2013

Updated to match played 18 May 2013
Source: Competitions

=== First Division League ===
==== Classification ====
Pos	Team	Pld	W	D	L	GF	GA	GD	Pts	Qualification or relegation
6	Hong Kong Rangers	18	5	5	8	32	52	−20	20 (Note: HKR 3–3 CIT, HKR 2–2 SUN, HKR 1–1 YHK; CIT 2–3 HKR, CIT 1–2 SUN, CIT 3–0 YHK; SUN 2–2 HKR, SUN 1–1 CIT, SUN 1–1 YHK; YHK 2–4 HKR, YHK 1–1 CIT, YHK 2–0 SUN)	
7	Sunray Cave JC Sun Hei	18	4	8	6	26	33	−7	20	
8	Citizen	18	5	5	8	31	27	+4	20	
9	Yokohama FC Hong Kong	18	4	8	6	25	34	−9	20	
10	Wofoo Tai Po (Note: Wofoo Tai Po won the 2012–13 Hong Kong Senior Challenge Shield and thus qualified for the 2012–13 Hong Kong Season play-off along with Southern District whom qualified due to Kitchee winning the FA Cup along with coming runners up in the league.) (R)	18	4	7	7	34	44	−10	19	2012–13 Hong Kong Season play-off and relegation to the 2013–14 Hong Kong Second Division League

Updated to match(es) played on 26 May 2013. Source:
Rules for classification: 1) points; 2) head-to-head points; 3) head-to-head goal difference; 4) head-to-head goals scored; 5) goal difference; 6) number of goals scored.
(R) Relegated

==== Results summary ====
Overall								Home						Away					
Pld	W	D	L	GF	GA	GD	Pts	W	D	L	GF	GA	GD	W	D	L	GF	GA	GD
18	4	7	7	34	44	−10	19	3	3	3	15	18	−3	1	4	4	19	26	−7

Last updated: 4 May 2013.

==== Results by round ====
Round	1	2	3	4	5	6	7	8	9	10	11	12	13	14	15	16	17	18
Ground	A	H	A	A	H	H	H	A	A	A	H	H	H	A	H	H	A	A
Result	D	L	W	D	L	D	L	L	L	L	W	W	D	D	D	W	L	D
Position	4	6	5	5	7	8	8	9	9	9	9	8	8	8	9	7	8	10

Updated to match(es) played on 4 May 2013. Source:
A = Away; H = Home; W = Win; D = Draw; L = Loss

== Matches ==
Win Draw Loss Void

=== Competitive ===
==== First Division League ====
31 August 2012 Week 1	Sun Pegasus	3 – 3	Wofoo Tai Po	Yuen Long, New Territories
20:00 (GMT+8)	Ng Wai Chiu 1'; Mckee 17', 51'; Lee Wai Lun (yellow card) 18'; Jone (yellow card) 42'; Ng Wai Chiu (yellow card) 45'	Report	19' (yellow card) 41' To Hon To; 53' Lui Chi Hing; 84' Christian Annan; (yellow card) 90' Aender	Stadium: Yuen Long Stadium (Capatity:4,932); Attendance: 1,332; Referee: Ng Kai Lam; Assistant referees: Lam Chi Ho, Chung Ming Sang; Fourth official: Yu Chun San

9 September 2012 Week 2	Wofoo Tai Po	2 – 3	Yokohama FC Hong Kong	Tai Po, New Territories
14:30 (GMT+8)	Li Shu Yeung (yellow card) 8' (yellow-red card) 57'; Alex 34' (yellow card) 35'; Che Run Qiu (yellow card) 54'; Aender 60' (pen.)	Report	13' (yellow card) 44' Leung Kwun Chung; 33' (pen.) Yoshitake; (yellow card) 62' Tsang Man Fai; 81' Lee Ka Yiu; (yellow card) 82' Wong Wai	Stadium: Tai Po Sports Ground (Capatity:3,000); Attendance: 814; Referee: Ng Chiu Kok; Assistant referees: Chow Chun Kit, Lam Shing Yan, Franky; Fourth official: Yau Ho Fai, Leo

9 September 2012 Week 3	Biu Chun Rangers	1 – 4	Wofoo Tai Po	Sham Shui Po, Kowloon
14:30 (GMT+8)	Liu Songwei (red card) 61'; Leung Hing Kit (yellow card) 77'; Lam Hok Hei 87'	Report	6', 13', 21' Alex; (yellow card) 40' (yellow-red card) 58' Annan; 67' Aender	Stadium: Sham Shui Po Sports Ground (Capatity:2,194); Attendance: 625; Referee: Ng Kai Lam; Assistant referees: Chan Shui Hung, Chung Ming Sang; Fourth official: Yu Chun San

29 September 2012 Week 4	Southern	2 – 2	Wofoo Tai Po	Aberdeen, Hong Kong Island
14:30 (GMT+8)	Chui Yiu Chung (yellow card) 12'; Landon (yellow card) 42' (goal) 54'; Rubén 86'	Report	21' Alex; 23' Annan	Stadium: Aberdeen Sports Ground (Capatity:4,000^{1}); Attendance: 803; Referee: Liu Kwok Man; Assistant referees: Ho Wai Sing, Poon Ming Fai; Fourth official: Sarao, Amarjit Singh

7 October 2012 Week 5	Wofoo Tai Po	0 – 5	South China	Tai Po, New Territories
14:30 (GMT+8)	Aender (yellow card) 45'	Report	6', 54' Lee Hong Lim; 13' Itaparica; (yellow card) 14' Luk Chi Ho; (yellow card) 15' Kwok Kin Pong; (yellow card) 21' Ticão; 29', 72' Au Yeung Yiu Chung; (yellow card) 37' Cheng Lai Hin	Stadium: Tai Po Sports Ground (Capatity:3,000); Attendance: 1,723; Referee: Ng Kai Lam; Assistant referees: Lam Nai Kei, Yu Chun San; Fourth official: Chan Ming Siu

21 October 2012 Week 6	Wofoo Tai Po	1 – 1	Sunray Cave JC Sun Hei	Tai Po, New Territories
14:30 (GMT+8)	Alex 34'; Wong Yim Kwan (yellow card) 51'; Lui Chi Hing (yellow card) 90'	Report	(yellow card) 12' Cheung Kwok Ming; (yellow card) 53' Roberto; 58' Barry; (yellow card) 88' Kilama	Stadium: Tai Po Sports Ground (Capatity:3,000); Attendance: 580; Referee: Liu Kwok Man; Assistant referees: Ng Kai Lam, Ho Wai Sing; Fourth official: Lo Yuk Ming Ricky

4 November 2012 Week 7	Wofoo Tai Po	1 – 3	Kitchee	Tai Po, New Territories
14:30 (GMT+8)	Li Shu Yeung 60'; Jing Teng (red card) 88'	Report	5' (pen.), 45' Couñago; 90' Jordi	Stadium: Tai Po Sports Ground (Capatity:3,000); Attendance: 920; Referee: Tong Kui Sum; Assistant referees: Chow Chun Kit, Lam Nai Kei; Fourth official: Wong Yin Wai

11 November 2012 Week 8	Citizen	7 – 3	Wofoo Tai Po	Mong Kok, Kowloon
17:30 (GMT+8)	Festus 20' (yellow card) 60'; Tam Lok Hin (yellow card) 28'; Nakamura 36', 90'; Detinho 48', 71', 72'; Sham Kwok Keung 75'; Hélio (yellow card) 76'	Report	40' Annan; 42', 45+1' Alex	Stadium: Mong Kok Stadium (Capatity:6,680); Attendance: 757; Referee: Cheng Oi Cho; Assistant referees: Chow Chun Kit, Chung Ming Sang; Fourth official: Ho Wai Sing

23 December 2012 Week 9	Tuen Mun	1 – 0	Wofoo Tai Po	Tuen Mun, New Territories
14:30 (GMT+8)	Xie Silida (yellow card) 25'; Beto 32'; Lai Yiu Cheong (yellow card) 65'; Wong Chi Chung (yellow card) 72' (yellow-red card) 82'; Kwok Wing Sun (yellow card) 84'	Report	(yellow card) 6' Chen Liming; (red card) 30' Li Hon Ho	Stadium: Tuen Mun Tang Siu Kin Sports Ground (Capatity:2,200); Attendance: 638; Referee: Ng Kai Lam; Assistant referees: Chow Chun Kit, Luk Kin Sun; Fourth official: Ho Wai Sing

18 January 2013 Week 10	South China	5 – 1	Wofoo Tai Po	So Kon Po, Hong Kong Island
20:00 (GMT+8)	Lee Hong Lim 25'; Chak Ting Fung (yellow card) 27'; Itaparica 39' (pen.); Ticão (yellow card) 43' (goal) 65' (yellow card) 66' (red card); Joel (yellow card) 50'; Au Yeung Yiu Chung 58', 71' (yellow card) 59'	Report	(yellow card) 35' Lui Chi Hing; (yellow card) 58' Li Shu Yeung; 86' Alex	Stadium: Hong Kong Stadium (Capatity:40,000); Attendance: 1,269; Referee: Cheng Oi Cho; Assistant referees: Chan Shui Hung, Lam Nai Kei; Fourth official: Tong Kui Sum

3 February 2013 Week 11	Wofoo Tai Po	3 – 1	Tuen Mun	Tai Po, New Territories
14:30 (GMT+8)	Diego 8' (o.g.); Chen Liming 11'; Annan 83'	Report	(yellow card) 28' Beto; 90+4' Ling Cong	Stadium: Tai Po Sports Ground (Capatity:3,000); Attendance: 766; Referee: Tong Kui Sum; Assistant referees: Cheng Oi Cho, Poon Ming Fai; Fourth official: Fok Pong Shing

23 February 2013 Week 12	Wofoo Tai Po	3 – 1	Citizen	Tai Po, New Territories
14:30 (GMT+8)	Annan 17'; Clayton (yellow card) 43'; Ye Jia 49'	Report	13' Sandro; (yellow card) 55' Gustavo; (yellow card) 61' Chiu Chun Kit	Stadium: Tai Po Sports Ground (Capatity:3,000); Attendance: 527; Referee: Cheng Oi Cho; Assistant referees: Chow Chun Kit, Lam Nai Kei; Fourth official: Lam Shing Yan Franky

3 March 2013 Week 13	Wofoo Tai Po	1 – 1	Biu Chun Rangers	Tai Po, New Territories
14:30 (GMT+8)	Annan 8'; Alex (yellow card) 85'	Report	4' Giovane; (yellow card) 70' Juninho	Stadium: Tai Po Sports Ground (Capatity:3,000); Attendance: 662; Referee: Ng Chiu Kok; Assistant referees: Chan Shui Hung, Lau Fong Hei; Fourth official: Yu Chun San

17 March 2013 Week 14	Kitchee	2 – 2	Wofoo Tai Po	Tseung Kwan O, New Territories
17:30 (GMT+8)	Lo Kwan Yee (yellow card) 45+1'; Chan Man Fai 51', 53'; Huang Yang (yellow card) 85'	Report	60' To Hon To; (yellow card) 84' Clayton; 85' Annan	Stadium: Tseung Kwan O Sports Ground (Capatity:3,500); Attendance: 708; Referee: Tong Kui Sum; Assistant referees: Lui Siu Chuen, Yu Chun San; Fourth official: Fok Pong Shing

31 March 2013 Week 15	Wofoo Tai Po	2 – 2	Sun Pegasus	Tai Po, New Territories
14:30 (GMT+8)	Aender 45+2'; Clayton (yellow card) 63'; Ye Jia 87'	Report	31' Xu Deshuai; 75' Cesar; (yellow card) 80' Lo Chun Kit	Stadium: Tai Po Sports Ground (Capatity:3,000); Attendance: 888; Referee: Ho Wai Sing; Assistant referees: Chow Chun Kit, Chung Ming Sang; Fourth official: Yau Tsz Yeung

13 April 2013 Week 16	Wofoo Tai Po	2 – 1	Southern	Tai Po, New Territories
14:30 (GMT+8)	Alex 44'; Clayton 45+4'; Annan (yellow card) 90'	Report	(yellow card) 4' (goal) 9' Chan Cheuk Kwong; (yellow card) 32' Tse Man Wing; (yellow card) 80' Dieguito; (yellow card) 90+2' Ha Shing Chi	Stadium: Tai Po Sports Ground (Capatity:3,000); Attendance: 758; Referee: Ho Wai Sing; Assistant referees: Chow Chun Kit, Luk Kin Sun; Fourth official: Yau Ho Fai Leo

20 April 2013 Week 17	Sunray Cave JC Sun Hei	3 – 2	Wofoo Tai Po	Mong Kok, Kowloon
17:30 (GMT+8)	Liang Zicheng 15' (yellow card) 90+4'; Su Yang (yellow card) 24'; Choi Kwok Wai (yellow card) 50'; James Ha 72'; Leung Tsz Chun 90+1' (yellow card) 90+2'; Yeung Chi Lun (yellow card) 90+5'; Roberto (yellow card) 90+8'	Report	(yellow card) 41' Annan; 66' Alex; (yellow card) 78' Li Shu Yeung; 87' Caleb; (yellow card) 88' Clayton	Stadium: Mong Kok Stadium (Capatity:6,680); Attendance: 1,563; Referee: Ho Wai Sing; Assistant referees: Chow Chun Kit, Chung Ming Sang; Fourth official: Luk Kin Sun

4 May 2013 Week 18	Yokohama FC Hong Kong	2 – 2	Wofoo Tai Po	Siu Sai Wan, Hong Kong Island
15:30 (GMT+8)	Lee Ka Yiu 23'; Wong Wai (yellow card) 37'; Fukuda 90+5'	Report	8' (red card) 19' Alex; (yellow card) 27' Li Shu Yeung; (yellow card) 33' Clayton; 90' Aender; (yellow card) 90+3' Che Run Qiu	Stadium: Siu Sai Wan Sports Ground (Capatity:12,000); Attendance: 1,064; Referee: Liu Kwok Man; Assistant referees: Chow Chun Kit, Lam Chi Ho; Fourth official: Luk Kin Sun

==== Senior Challenge Shield ====
===== First round =====
23 September 2012 1st leg	Wofoo Tai Po	2 – 0	Yokohama FC Hong Kong	Tai Po, New Territories
14:00 (GMT+8)	Lui Chi Hing (yellow card) 9'; Alex 15' (yellow card) 65'; Clayton 42'	Report	(yellow card) 52' Li Jian	Stadium: Tai Po Sports Ground (Capacity: 3,000); Attendance: 706; Referee: Tong Kui Sum; Assistant referees: Ho Wai Sing, Poon Ming Fai; Fourth official: Chow Chun Kit

11 October 2012 2nd leg	Yokohama FC Hong Kong	0 – 0 (0 – 2 agg.)	Wofoo Tai Po	Siu Sai Wan, Hong Kong Island
20:00 (GMT+8)	Fong Pak Lun (yellow card) 90'; Yoshitake (yellow card) 90'	Report	(yellow card) 90' Wong Yim Kwan	Stadium: Siu Sai Wan Sports Ground (Capacity: 12,000); Attendance: 592; Referee: Tong Kui Sum; Assistant referees: Lam Nai Kei, Poon Ming Fai; Fourth official: Ng Chiu Kok

===== Quarter-finals =====
18 November 2012 1st leg	Tuen Mun	3 – 2	Wofoo Tai Po	Tuen Mun, New Territories
17:30(GMT+8)	Mauricio 5', 48'; Law Ka Lok (yellow card) 45'; Beto 84' (pen.)	Report	65' (yellow card) 72' Annan; 90' Clayton	Stadium: Tuen Mun Tang Shiu Kin Sports Ground (Capacity: 2,200); Attendance: 661; Referee: Tong Kui Sum; Assistant referees: Chow Chun Kit, Lam Shing Yan; Fourth official: Chan Ming Siu

24 November 2012 2nd leg	Wofoo Tai Po	5 – 0 (7 – 2 agg.)	Tuen Mun	Tsing Yi, New Territories
14:30(GMT+8)	Alex 71', 82', 90'; To Hon To 79'; Ye Jia 89'	Report	(yellow card) 40' (yellow-red card) 53' Mauricio; (yellow card) 55' Beto; (yellow card) 72' Wong Chi Chung; (yellow card) 81' Diego; (yellow card) 84' Law Ka Lok; (yellow card) 90+2' Li Haiqiang	Stadium: Tsing Yi Sports Ground (Capacity: 1,500); Attendance: 483; Referee: Cheng Oi Cho; Assistant referees: Chow Chun Kit, Poon Ming Fai; Fourth official: Sarao Amarjit Singh

===== Semi-finals =====
16 December 2012 1st leg	Southern	1 – 0	Wofoo Tai Po	Tsing Yi, New Territories
14:30(GMT+8)	Fofo (yellow card) 24'; Lander (yellow card) 58'; Rubén 69'; Dieguito (yellow card) 90+4'	Report	(yellow card) 74' To Hon To; (yellow card) 88' Clayton	Stadium: Tsing Yi Sports Ground (Capacity: 1,500); Attendance: 533; Referee: Ho Wai Sing; Assistant referees: Tong Kui Sum, Poon Ming Fai; Fourth official: Yu Chun San

6 January 2013 2nd leg	Wofoo Tai Po	3 – 1 (3 – 2 agg.)	Southern	Tai Po, New Territories
14:30(GMT+8)	Aender 2' (yellow card) 83'; Alex 15' (pen.); To Hon To 53' (yellow card) 57'; Lui Chi Hing (yellow card) 90+3'; Li Hon Ho (yellow card) 90+4'	Report	(yellow card) 13' Fofo; (yellow card) 14' Chiu Yu Ming; (yellow card) 33' Rubén; (yellow card) 36' Carril; (yellow card) 55' Landon Ling; 75' Chan Cheuk Kwong	Stadium: Tai Po Sports Ground (Capacity: 3,000); Attendance: 956; Referee: Cheng Oi Cho; Assistant referees: Chan Shui Hung, Yu Chun San; Fourth official: Lam Shing Yan Franky

===== Final =====
27 January 2013	Wofoo Tai Po	2 – 2 (a.e.t.) (5 – 3 p)	Citizen	So Kon Po, Hong Kong Island
16:00(GMT+8)	Chan Sze Wing (yellow card) 14'; Jing Teng (yellow card) 41'; Annan (yellow card) 49'; Clayton (yellow card) 53' (goal) 61'; Aender 74'; Lui Chi Hing (yellow card) 105+1'	Report	43' (yellow card) 63' So Loi Keung; 47' Detinho; (yellow card) 79' Hélio; (yellow card) 93' Campion	Stadium: Hong Kong Stadium (Capacity: 40,000); Attendance: 3,294; Referee: Ng Chiu Kok; Assistant referees: Chow Chun Kit, Lam Chi Ho; Fourth official: Ng Kai Lam; Man of the Match: Aender (Wofoo Tai Po)
	Penalties
	Aender (penalty scored); Alex (penalty scored); Lui Chi Hing (penalty scored); Annan (penalty scored); Caleb (penalty scored)		Campion (penalty missed); Festus (penalty scored); Detinho (penalty scored); Sham Kwok Fai (penalty scored)

==== FA Cup ====
===== First round =====
26 December 2012 1st leg	Wofoo Tai Po	3 – 0	Southern	Kowloon Bay, Kowloon
17:30(GMT+8)	Annan 28', 60', 66'	Report	(yellow card) 49' Chan Ming Kong; (yellow card) 90' Cheng Chi Wing	Stadium: Kowloon Bay Park^{2} (Capacity: 1,200); Attendance: 273; Referee: Tong Kui Sum; Assistant referees: Lam Chi Ho, Yu Kin Fung; Fourth official: Yu Chun San

12 January 2013 2nd leg	Southern	2 – 1 (2 – 4 agg.)	Wofoo Tai Po	Aberdeen, Hong Kong Island
14:30(GMT+8)	Carril 14' (pen.) (yellow card) 70'; Lander (yellow card) 24'; Chan Cheuk Kwong (yellow card) 34'; Cheng Chi Ying (yellow card) 41'; Landon 55'	Report	7' Annan	Stadium: Aberdeen Sports Ground (Capacity: 4,000^{1}); Attendance: 325; Referee: Ng Chiu Kok; Assistant referees: Ho Wai Sing, Chan Ming Siu; Fourth official: Yu Chun San

===== Quarter-finals =====
17 February 2013 1st leg	Wofoo Tai Po	0 – 0	Yokohama FC Hong Kong	Tai Po, New Territories
14:30(GMT+8)	Ye Jia (yellow card) 58'	Report	(yellow card) 58' Lau Cheuk Hin; (yellow card) 82' Mirko; (yellow card) 90' Leung Kwun Chung	Stadium: Tai Po Sports Ground (Capacity: 3,000); Attendance: 497; Referee: Liu Kwok Man; Assistant referees: Chow Chun Kit, Yau Ho Fai Leo; Fourth official: Lam Shing Yan

10 March 2013 2nd leg	Yokohama FC Hong Kong	1 – 3 (1 – 3 agg.)	Wofoo Tai Po	Siu Sai Wan, Hong Kong Island
14:30(GMT+8)	Lam Ngai Tong (yellow card) 84'; Fong Pak Lun (yellow card) 90+2'; Clayton 90+3' (o.g.)	Report	(yellow card) 42' Lui Chi Hing; 50' Alex; 74', 88' Annan	Stadium: Siu Sai Wan Sports Ground (Capacity: 12,000); Attendance: 447; Referee: Ho Wai Sing; Assistant referees: Chan Shui Hung, Poon Ming Fai; Fourth official: Chow Chun Kit

===== Semi-finals =====
6 April 2013 1st leg	Sun Pegasus	1 – 0	Wofoo Tai Po	Yuen Long, New Territories
17:30(GMT+8)	Tong Kin Man (yellow card) 29'; Lo Chun Kit (yellow card) 70'; Xu Deshuai 77'	Report	(yellow card) 90+3' Aender; (yellow card) 90+5' Chan Sze Wing	Stadium: Yuen Long Stadium (Capacity: 4,932); Attendance: 606; Referee: Liu Kwok Man; Assistant referees: Ng Chiu Kok, Lam Nai Kei; Fourth official: Yu Chun San

27 April 2013 2nd leg	Wofoo Tai Po	0 – 1 (0 – 2 agg.)	Sun Pegasus	Tai Po, New Territories
14:30(GMT+8)	Alex (yellow card) 31'; Clayton (yellow card) 63'	Report	35' (yellow card) 68' Chan Pak Hang; (yellow card) 57' Tong Kin Man; (yellow card) 70' Fung Kai Hong; (yellow card) 72' Miović	Stadium: Tai Po Sports Ground (Capacity: 3,000); Attendance: 904; Referee: Tong Kui Sum; Assistant referees: Ho Wai Sing, Chan Shui Hung; Fourth official: Luk Kin Sun

==== Hong Kong AFC Cup play-offs ====
18 May 2013 Semi-finals	Tuen Mun	2 – 1	Wofoo Tai Po	Mong Kok, Kowloon
16:00 (GMT+8)	Daniel 6', 89' (yellow card) 89'; Lai Yiu Cheong (yellow card) 41'	Report	(yellow card) 38' Li Shu Yeung; 42' (pen.) Aender; (yellow card) 45+3' Ye Jia	Stadium: Mong Kok Stadium (Capatity:6,680); Attendance: 1,250; Referee: Tong Kui Sum; Assistant referees: Cheng Oi Cho, Chan Shui Hung; Fourth official: Lau Fong Hei

Remarks:
^{1} The capacity of Aberdeen Sports Ground is originally 9,000, but only the 4,000-seated main stand is opened for football match.
^{2} Wofoo Tai Po's home match against Southern of FA Cup first round will be played at Kowloon Bay Park instead of Wofoo Tai Po's home ground Tai Po Sports Ground.
