= 2010–11 Hong Kong FA Cup =

Tournament details
- Country: Hong Kong
- Teams: 10

Final positions
- Champions: South China (10th title)
- Runners-up: NT Realty Wofoo Tai Po

Tournament statistics
- Matches played: 10
- Goals scored: 41 (4.1 per match)
- Attendance: 13,299 (1,330 per match)
- Top goal scorer: (Brazil) Itaparica (TSW Pegasus) (4 goals)

The 2010–11 Hong Kong FA Cup was the 37th season of Hong Kong FA Cup and was played as a knockout competition for all Hong Kong First Division League teams in the 2010–11 season. The first matches were played on 27 February 2011, and the final was played on 29 May 2011.

== Calendar ==
Round	Date	Matches	Clubs
First Round	27 February 2011	2	10 → 8
Quarter-finals	20 March 2011 – 31 March 2011	4	8 → 4
Semi-finals	15 May 2011	2	4 → 2
Final	29 May 2011	1	2 → 1

== Bracket ==
Quarter-finals
31 March - Yuen Long
TSW Pegasus	7
Tai Chung	1
31 March - Yuen Long
NTR WF Tai Po	4
Tuen Mun	0
20 March - Tsing Yi
Citizen	1
South China	3
20 March - Tsing Yi
Fourway Rangers	2
Sun Hei	3

Semi-finals
15 May - Hong Kong
TSW Pegasus	2
NTR WF Tai Po (a.e.t.)	4
15 May - Hong Kong
South China	3
Sun Hei	1

Final
29 May - Hong Kong
NTR WF Tai Po	1
South China (a.e.t.)	2

== First round ==
27 February 2011
14:00

HKFC	0–2	Sun Hei
	Report	Cahê 25', 87'

Tsing Yi Sports Ground
Attendance: 806
Referee: Pau Sai Yin

27 February 2011
16:30

Kitchee	1–1 (a.e.t.)	Tuen Mun
Lam Ka Wai 105'	Report	Leung Kwok Wai 101'
Penalties
J. Tarrés (penalty scored); Losada (penalty scored); Dani (penalty missed); Wang Zhenpeng (penalty scored); Luzardo (penalty scored); Chu Siu Kei (penalty missed); Liu Quankun (penalty missed)	4–5	(penalty scored) Mijanovic; (penalty scored) Trnavac; (penalty missed) Mirko; (penalty scored) Leung Kwok Wai; (penalty scored) Wei Zhao; (penalty missed) Chan Hin Kwong; (penalty scored) Chow Cheuk Fung

Tsing Yi Sports Ground
Attendance: 806
Referee: Tong Kui Sum

== Quarter-finals ==
20 March 2011
14:00

Fourway Rangers	2–3	Sun Hei
Makhosonke 22'; Li Jian 90'	Report	Wong Chun Yue 44'; Barry 45'; Iu Wai 76' (o.g.)

Tsing Yi Sports Ground
Attendance: 696
Referee: Wong Po On

20 March 2011
16:30

NT Realty Wofoo Tai Po	4–0	Tuen Mun
Ye Jia 11'; Chen Liming 15'; Christian 81', 88'	Report

Tsing Yi Sports Ground
Attendance: 696
Referee: Ng Kai Lam

31 March 2011
14:00

TSW Pegasus	7–1	Tai Chung
Godfred 17', 34', 47'; Itaparica 21', 45'; Lee Hong Lim 60'; Lai Yiu Cheong 73'	Report	Cheng King Ho 86' (pen.)

Yuen Long Stadium
Attendance: 1,144
Referee: Wong Po On

31 March 2011
16:30

Citizen	1–3	South China
Paulinho 85'	Report	Kežman 43'; Giovane 67'; Xu Deshuai 78'

Yuen Long Stadium
Attendance: 1,144
Referee: Liu Kwok Man

== Semi-final ==
15 May 2011
14:00

TSW Pegasus	2–4 (a.e.t.)	NT Realty Wofoo Tai Po
Itaparica 38', 86' (pen.)	Report	Christian 32'; Clayton 45', 94'; Chen Liming 111'

Hong Kong Stadium
Attendance: 2,089
Referee: Ng Kai Lam

15 May 2011
17:00

South China	3–1	Sun Hei
Chan Siu Ki 33'; Kwok Kin Pong 61'; Li Haiqiang 67'	Report	Cahê 57'

Hong Kong Stadium
Attendance: 2,089
Referee: Ng Chiu Kok

== Final ==
29 May 2011
15:00

NT Realty Wofoo Tai Po	1–2 (a.e.t.)	South China
Ye Jia 40'	Report	Chan Wai Ho 12'; Kežman 103'

Hong Kong Stadium
Attendance: 3,829
Referee: Tong Kui Sum

NT Realty Wofoo Tai Po	South China

NT Realty Wofoo Tai Po:
GK	33	(Hong Kong) Pang Tsz Kin
RB	3	(Hong Kong) Chan Sze Wing
CB	5	(Brazil) Clayton
CB	21	(Hong Kong) Chan Yuk Chi (c)
LB	14	(Hong Kong) Kwok Wing Sun
DM	10	(Hong Kong) Lui Chi Hing
DM	27	(Brazil) Ricardo Júnior	(yellow card) 117'
AM	13	(Hong Kong) To Hon To		(substituted off) 86'
RW	23	(Hong Kong) Ye Jia
LW	15	(Ghana) Christian Annan		(substituted off) 106'
CF	7	(Cameroon) Guy Junior Ondoua	(yellow card) 65'	(substituted off) 73'
Substitutes:
GK	1	(Hong Kong) Chiu Yu Ming
DF	20	(Hong Kong) Cheung Chi Yung
MF	8	(Hong Kong) Li Chun Yip		(substituted on) 73'
MF	11	(Hong Kong) Sze Kin Wai
MF	25	(China) Che Runqiu
MF	26	(China) Jing Teng		(substituted on) 106'
FW	9	(China) Chen Liming		(substituted on) 86'
Coach:
(Hong Kong) Cheung Po Chun

South China:
GK	1	(Hong Kong) Yapp Hung Fai
RB	2	(Hong Kong) Lee Chi Ho	(yellow card) 89'
CB	15	(Hong Kong) Chan Wai Ho
CB	30	(Brazil) Joel
LB	6	(Hong Kong) Wong Chin Hung		(substituted off) 71'
RM	9	(Hong Kong) Lee Wai Lim		(substituted off) 106'
CM	11	(Hong Kong) Li Haiqiang (c)	(yellow card) 108'
CM	16	(Hong Kong) Leung Chun Pong
LM	18	(Hong Kong) Kwok Kin Pong
RF	7	(Hong Kong) Chan Siu Ki
LF	17	(Brazil) Giovane		(substituted off) 67'
Substitutes:
GK	23	(Hong Kong) Zhang Chunhui
DF	3	(Hong Kong) Poon Yiu Cheuk
DF	33	(Hong Kong) Ng Wai Chiu
MF	5	(Hong Kong) Bai He		(substituted on) 106'
MF	10	(Hong Kong) Au Yeung Yiu Chung
MF	25	(Brazil) Wellingsson de Souza		(substituted on) 71'
FW	38	(Serbia) Mateja Kežman	(yellow card) 90'	(substituted on) 67'
Coach:
(Hong Kong) Chan Ho Yin

MATCH OFFICIALS

- Assistant referees:
  - Chan Shui Hung
  - Lam Chi Ho
- Fourth official: Cheng Oi Cho

MATCH RULES

- 90 minutes.
- 30 minutes of extra time if scores level.
- Penalty shoot-out if scores still level.
- Seven named substitutes.
- Maximum of 3 substitutions can be used.

== Scorers ==
The scorers in the 2010–11 Hong Kong FA Cup are as follows:

4 goals

- (Brazil) Itaparica (TSW Pegasus)

3 goals

- (Brazil) Cahê (Citizen)
- (Ghana) Christian Annan (NT Realty Wofoo Tai Po)
- (Ghana) Godfred Karikari (TSW Pegasus)

2 goals

- (Serbia) Mateja Kežman (South China)
- (Brazil) Clayton Michel Afonso (NT Realty Wofoo Tai Po)
- (China) Chen Liming (NT Realty Wofoo Tai Po)
- (Hong Kong) Ye Jia (NT Realty Wofoo Tai Po)

1 goal

- (Hong Kong) Chan Siu Ki (South China)
- (Hong Kong) Xu Deshuai (South China)
- (Hong Kong) Li Haiqiang (South China)
- (Hong Kong) Chan Wai Ho (South China)
- (Hong Kong) Kwok Kin Pong (South China)
- (Brazil) Giovane (South China)
- (Brazil) Paulinho Piracicaba (Citizen)
- (Hong Kong) Lam Ka Wai (Kitchee)
- (Hong Kong) Leung Kwok Wai (Tuen Mun)
- (Hong Kong) Lai Yiu Cheong (TSW Pegasus)
- (Hong Kong) Lee Hong Lim (TSW Pegasus)
- (Guinea) Mamadou Barry (Sun Hei)
- (Hong Kong) Wong Chun Yue (Sun Hei)
- (South Africa) Makhosonke Bhengu (Fourway Rangers)
- (China) Li Jian (Fourway Rangers)
- (Hong Kong) Cheng King Ho (Tai Chung)

Own goal

- (Hong Kong) Iu Wai (Fourway Rangers)
