= 2005–06 Hong Kong Second Division League =

2005–06 Hong Kong Second Division League was the 92nd season of Hong Kong Second Division League.

== Teams ==
- Derico (Chinese: 德高朋友)
- Double Flower (Chinese: 花花)
- Eastern (Chinese: 東方)
- Fire Services (Chinese: 消防)
- Fukien (Chinese: 福建)
- Hong Kong Football Club (Chinese: 港會)
- Korchina (Chinese: 韓中)
- Kwai Tsing (Chinese: 葵青)
- Kwok Keung (Chinese: 國強)
- Lucky Mile 浩運
- New Fair Kui Tan (Chinese: 宏輝駒騰)
- Tai Po (Chinese: 大埔)
- Tung Po (Chinese: 東寶)

== Final league table ==
Pos	Team	Pld	W	D	L	GF	GA	GD	Pts	Promotion or relegation
1	HKFC	24	20	3	1	107	21	+86	63	Champion, promoted to First Division
2	Tai Po	24	16	6	2	73	37	+36	54	Promoted to First Division and branded Wofoo Tai Po
3	Tung Po	24	11	10	3	61	45	+16	43	
4	Lucky Mile	24	11	5	8	35	41	−6	38	
5	Fukien	24	12	1	11	44	41	+3	37	
6	Kwok Keung	24	10	3	11	43	54	−11	33	
7	Double Flower	24	8	5	11	43	50	−7	29	
8	Korchina	24	8	5	11	40	52	−12	29	
9	Eastern	24	7	6	11	43	57	−14	27	
10	Kwai Tsing	24	7	6	11	30	49	−19	27	
11	New Fair Kui Tan	24	6	4	14	39	58	−19	22	
12	Fire Services	24	6	4	14	29	47	−18	22	Relegated to Third 'A' Division
13	Derico	24	3	4	17	22	57	−35	13	Relegated to Third 'A' Division

== Top scorers ==
Rank	Scorer	Club	Goals
1	Lawrence Akandu	Tung Po	21
2	Alejandro Ramirez Portillo	HKFC	20
3	Jaimes Mckee	HKFC	19
4	Michael Xavier Campion	HKFC	17
5	Lui Chi Hing	Tai Po	15
6	Christian Annan	Eastern	14
7	James John Daws	Tung Po	13
8	Wong Man Kit	Tai Po	12
8	Lee Hong Lim	Tai Po	12
10	Lee Wai Lim	Tai Po	11
