= Wong Yim Kwan =

Hong Kong footballer (born 1992)

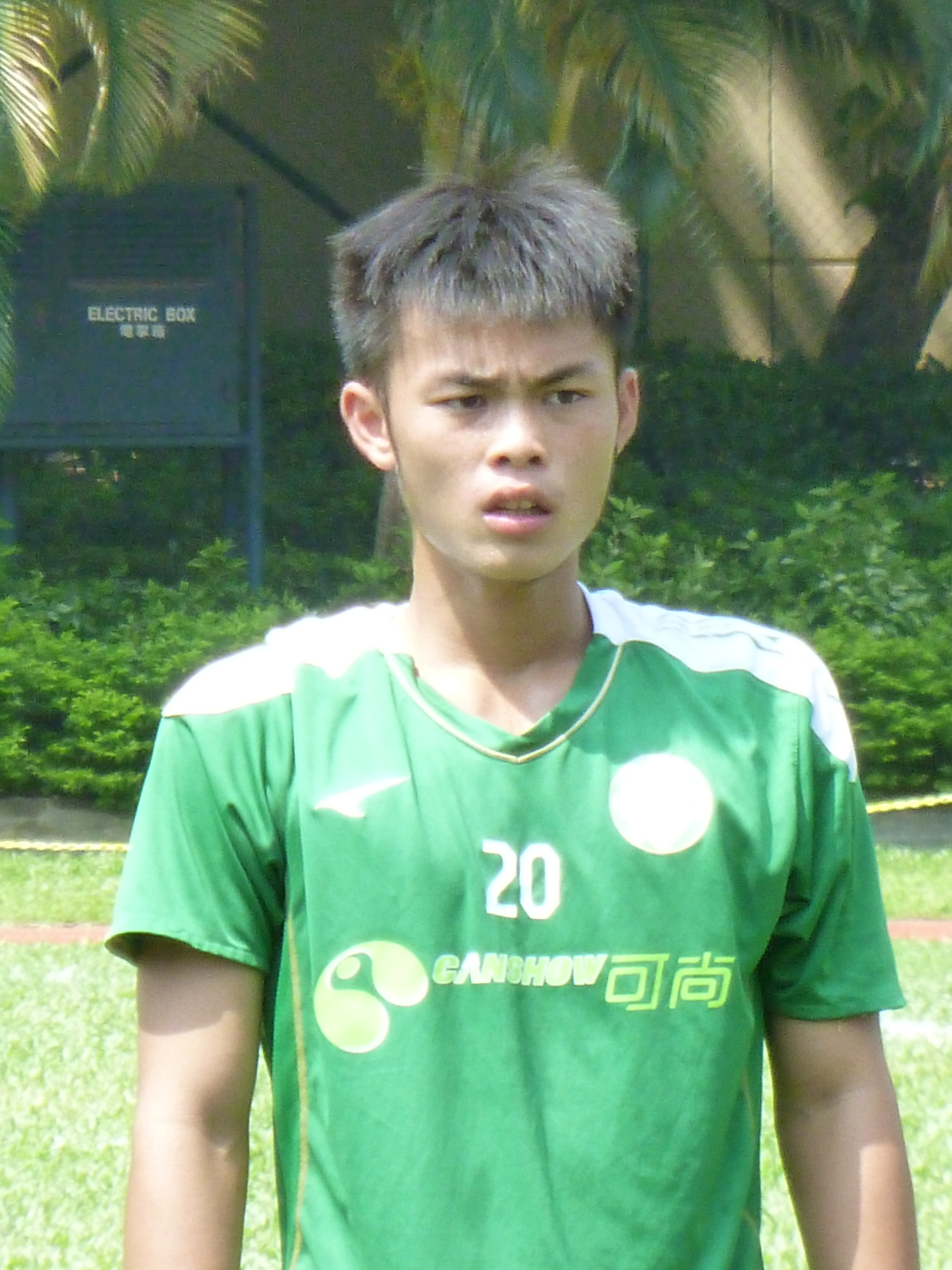

Personal information
- Full name: Wong Yim Kwan
- Date of birth: 1 August 1992 (age 34)
- Place of birth: Hong Kong
- Height: 1.72 m (5 ft 8 in)
- Positions: Midfielder; defender

Youth career
- Tai Po

Senior career*
| Years | Team | Apps | (Gls) |
| 2009–2013 | Tai Po | 10 | (0) |
| 2011–2012 | → HK Sapling (loan) | 11 | (0) |
| 2013–2014 | Happy Valley | 7 | (0) |
| 2014 | Pegasus | 10 | (0) |
| 2014–2015 | → Tai Po (loan) | 5 | (0) |
| 2015–2016 | Eastern District | 14 | (0) |
| 2016–2018 | Yuen Long | 39 | (0) |
| 2018–2021 | Lee Man | 21 | (0) |

International career
| 2007 | Hong Kong U-16 | 1 | (0) |
| 2012–2013 | Hong Kong U-23 | 2 | (0) |
- * Club domestic league appearances and goals as of 30 July 2021

Wong Yim Kwan (Chinese: 黃炎堃; Jyutping: wong^{4} jim^{4} kwan^{1}; born 1 August 1992) is a former Hong Kong professional footballer who played as a midfielder or a defender.

== Club career ==
=== Tai Po ===
Wong joined Tai Po youth academy when he was young and was promoted to the first team in the 2009–10 season. He rarely got chance to play and therefore was loaned to Hong Kong Sapling in the 2011–12 season. He returned to Tai Po in July 2012. However, Tai Po was relegated to the Second Division and he chose to leave the club.

=== Happy Valley ===
Wong joined newly promoted First Division club Happy Valley on a free transfer.

=== Pegasus ===
On 30 December 2013, it was announced that Wong had signed with Pegasus alongside Australian player Marko Jesic.

=== Lee Man ===
Following two seasons with Yuen Long, Wong signed with Lee Man on 17 July 2018.

== Career statistics ==
=== Club ===
As of 4 May 2013

| Club | Season | Division | League | | Senior Shield | | League Cup | | FA Cup | | AFC Cup | | Others^{1} | | Total | |
| Club | Season | Division | Apps | Goals | Apps | Goals | Apps | Goals | Apps | Goals | Apps | Goals | Apps | Goals | Apps | Goals |
|---|---|---|---|---|---|---|---|---|---|---|---|---|---|---|---|---|
| Tai Po | 2009–10 | First Division | 1 | 0 | 0 | 0 | — | — | 0 | 0 | 0 | 0 | N/A | N/A | 1 | 0 |
| Tai Po | 2010–11 | First Division | 1 | 0 | 0 | 0 | — | — | 0 | 0 | N/A | N/A | N/A | N/A | 1 | 0 |
| HK Sapling (loan) | 2011–12 | First Division | 11 | 0 | 0 | 0 | 0 | 0 | 2 | 0 | N/A | N/A | N/A | N/A | 13 | 0 |
| HK Sapling Total | | | 11 | 0 | 0 | 0 | 0 | 0 | 2 | 0 | 0 | 0 | 0 | 0 | 13 | 0 |
| Tai Po | 2012–13 | First Division | 8 | 0 | 5 | 0 | — | — | 2 | 0 | N/A | N/A | 0 | 0 | 15 | 0 |
| Tai Po Total | | | 10 | 0 | 5 | 0 | 0 | 0 | 2 | 0 | 0 | 0 | 0 | 0 | 17 | 0 |
| Happy Valley | 2013–14 | First Division | 0 | 0 | 0 | 0 | — | — | 0 | 0 | N/A | N/A | N/A | N/A | 0 | 0 |
| Happy Valley Total | | | 0 | 0 | 0 | 0 | 0 | 0 | 0 | 0 | 0 | 0 | 0 | 0 | 0 | 0 |
| Total | | | 21 | 0 | 5 | 0 | 0 | 0 | 4 | 0 | 0 | 0 | 0 | 0 | 30 | 0 |

=== Notes ===
1. Others include Hong Kong season play-offs.

== Honours ==
Tai Po

- * Hong Kong Senior Shield: 2012–13

Yuen Long

- Hong Kong Senior Shield: 2017–18

Lee Man

- Hong Kong Sapling Cup: 2018–19
