= Tai Po Sports Ground =

Sports venue in Hong Kong

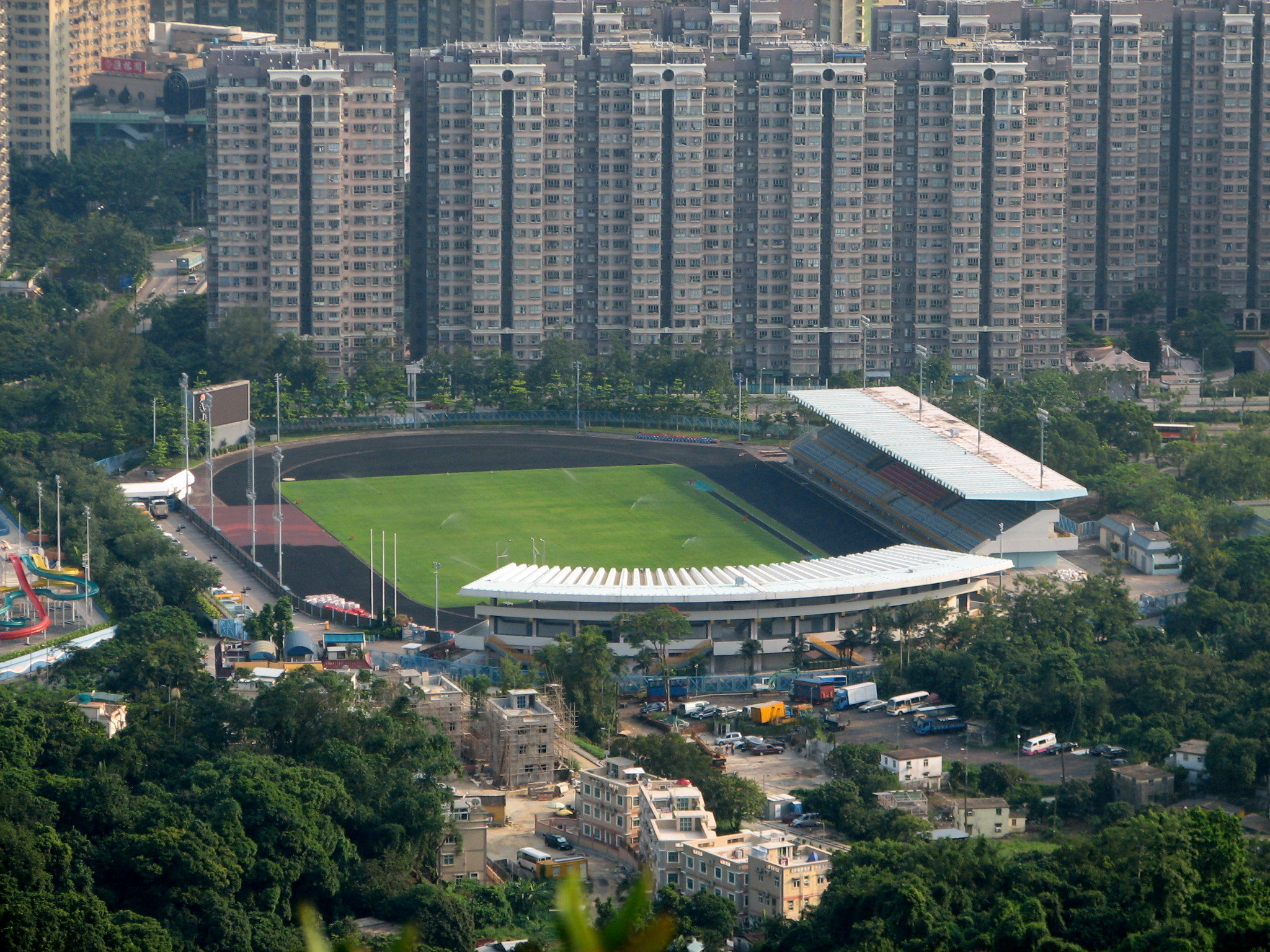
- Interactive map of Tai Po Sports Ground
- Location: 21 Tai Po Tau Road, Tai Po, Hong Kong
- Coordinates: 22°27′20.3″N 114°9′45″E
- Owner: Hong Kong Government
- Operator: Leisure and Cultural Services Department
- Capacity: 3,200
- Surface: Grass
- Record attendance: 2,520
- Pitch size: 100 x 63 metres (109 x 68 yards)
- Public transit: Tai Wo station

Construction
- Opened: 23 September 1992; 33 years ago

Tenant
- Tai Po

Tai Po Sports Ground (Chinese: 大埔運動場) is a sports ground located in Tai Po, New Territories, Hong Kong.

It was the home stadium of Hong Kong Premier League club Tai Po.

== History ==
Tai Po Sports Ground staged its first ever Hong Kong First Division game on 30 September 2006, when Tai Po played South China. Despite losing 2–3, all 2,020 tickets for the match were sold out.

After the game, the stadium was determined to be unsuitable for future First Division games. Refurbishment work begun in 2007 to upgrade the facilities, including refurbishing the changing rooms, building corporate boxes, installing new goal posts and replanting the grass, such that Tai Po would be allowed play all of their home games during the 2007-08 season at the stadium. The work costed the Leisure and Cultural Services Department HK$1 million.

=== 2007–08 season ===
On 3 August 2007, the Hong Kong Football Association agreed to allow Tai Po to play 9 games at the Tai Po Sports Ground in the 2007-08 season, regardless whether the games are home or away. There were likely to be other first division matches for two other clubs at the ground on the same days as well. But after the pre-season pitch examination, the HKFA decided that it was not up to standard for First Division matches and thus no matches were to be held at the ground.

=== 2008–09 season ===
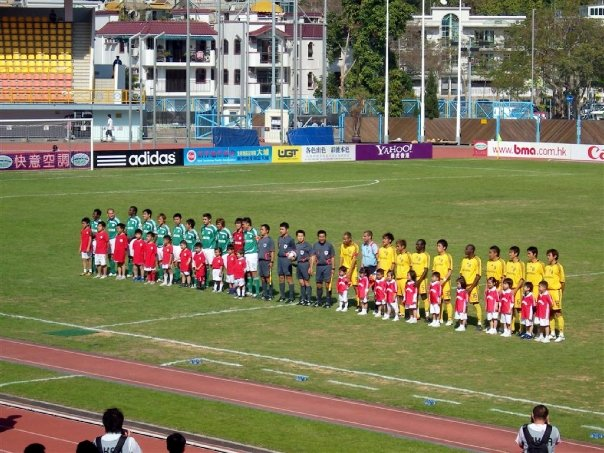
Tai Po hosts TSW Pegasus at Tai Po Sports Ground in a 2008-09 Hong Kong First Division League game.

With a potential 13 teams competing in the 2008-09 season, the HKFA determined that Mong Kok Stadium's pitch would not be able to handle the large number of games scheduled there and once again, suggested the use of Tai Po Sports Ground for Tai Po's home games. The HKFA's schedule for the first half of the 2008-09 season has shown that Tai Po has been granted the rights to play six of its home games here.

On 13 September 2008, Tai Po played its second ever home game at the sports ground against Sheffield United. 1,136 fans attended the game. Tai Po won 2–1. On 27 December 2008, Tai Po played host to South China and 2,520 spectators attended the game, setting a new record for the sports ground.

== Transport ==
The stadium is located near Tai Wo station, a 10–15 minute walk away.

== Gallery ==
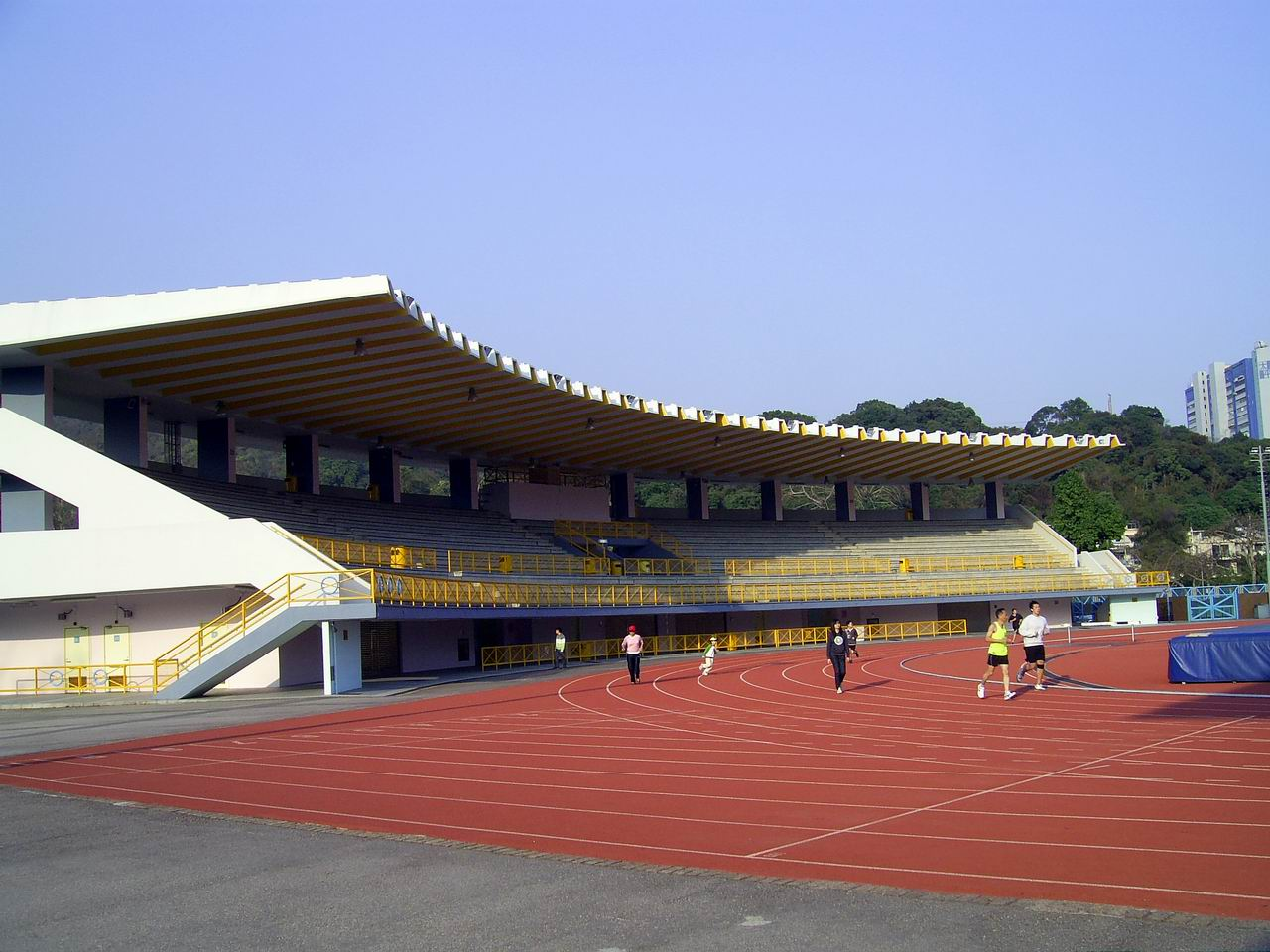
Tai Po Sport Ground

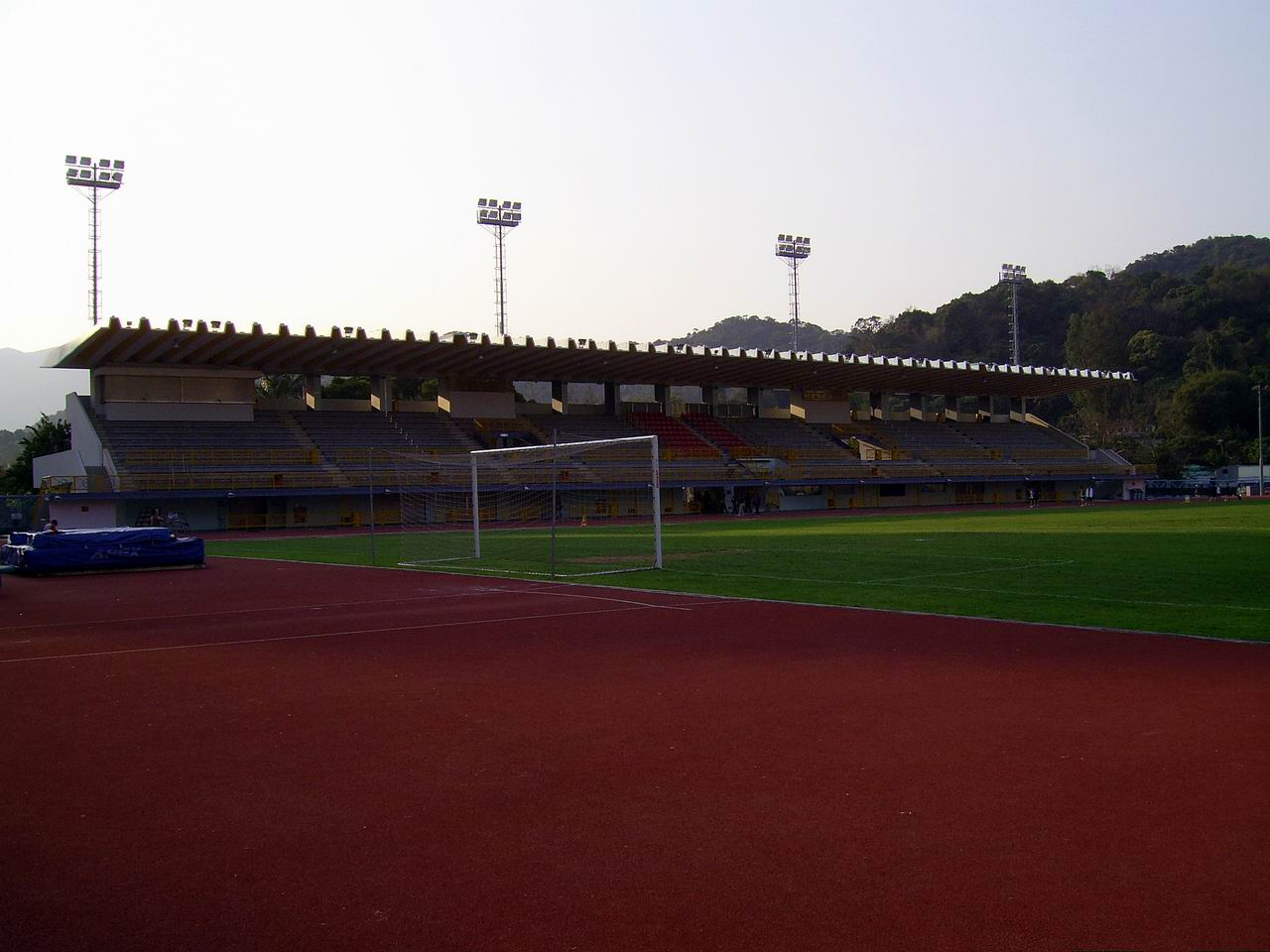
Main Grandstand

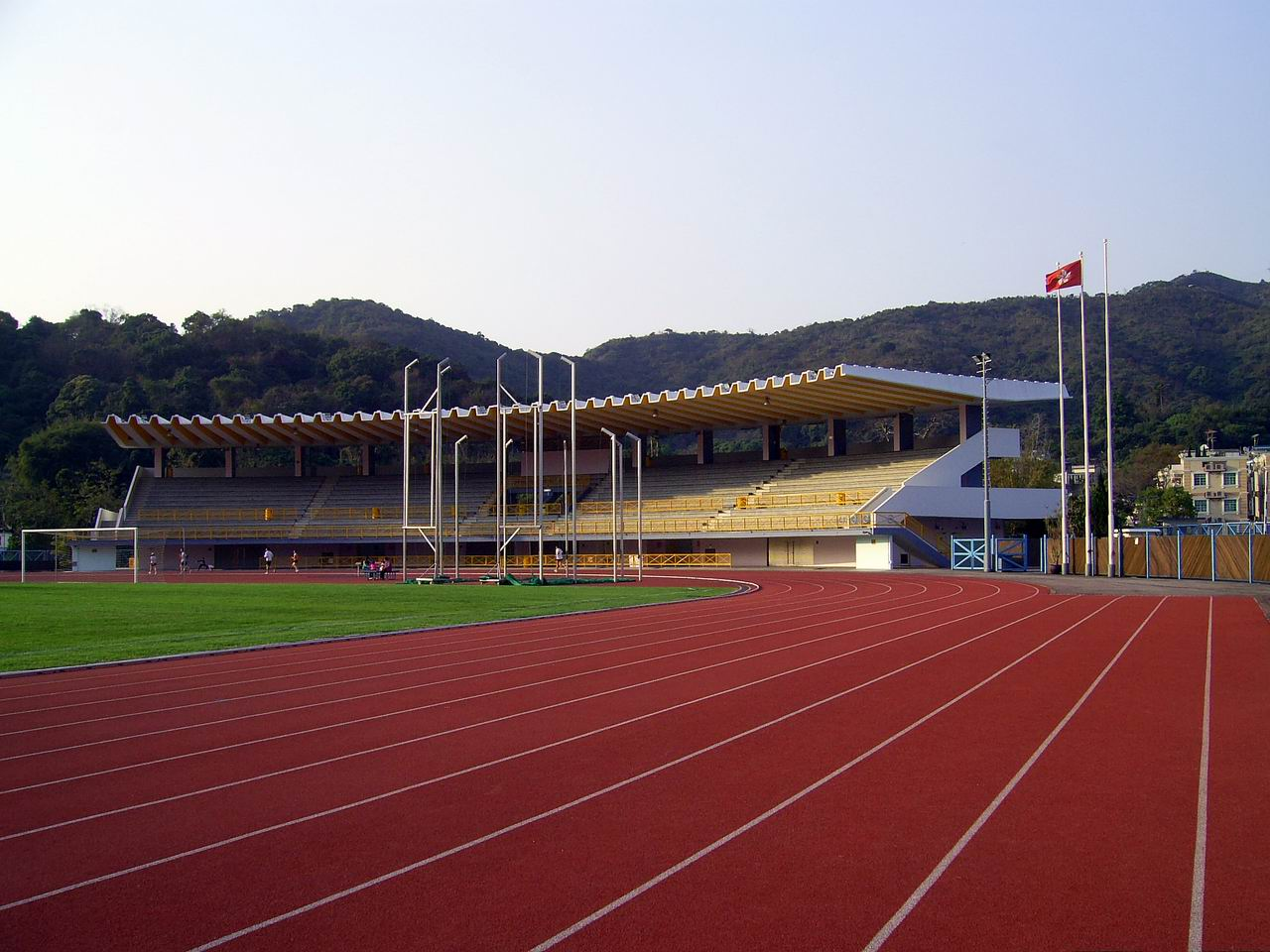
Grandstand behind goal

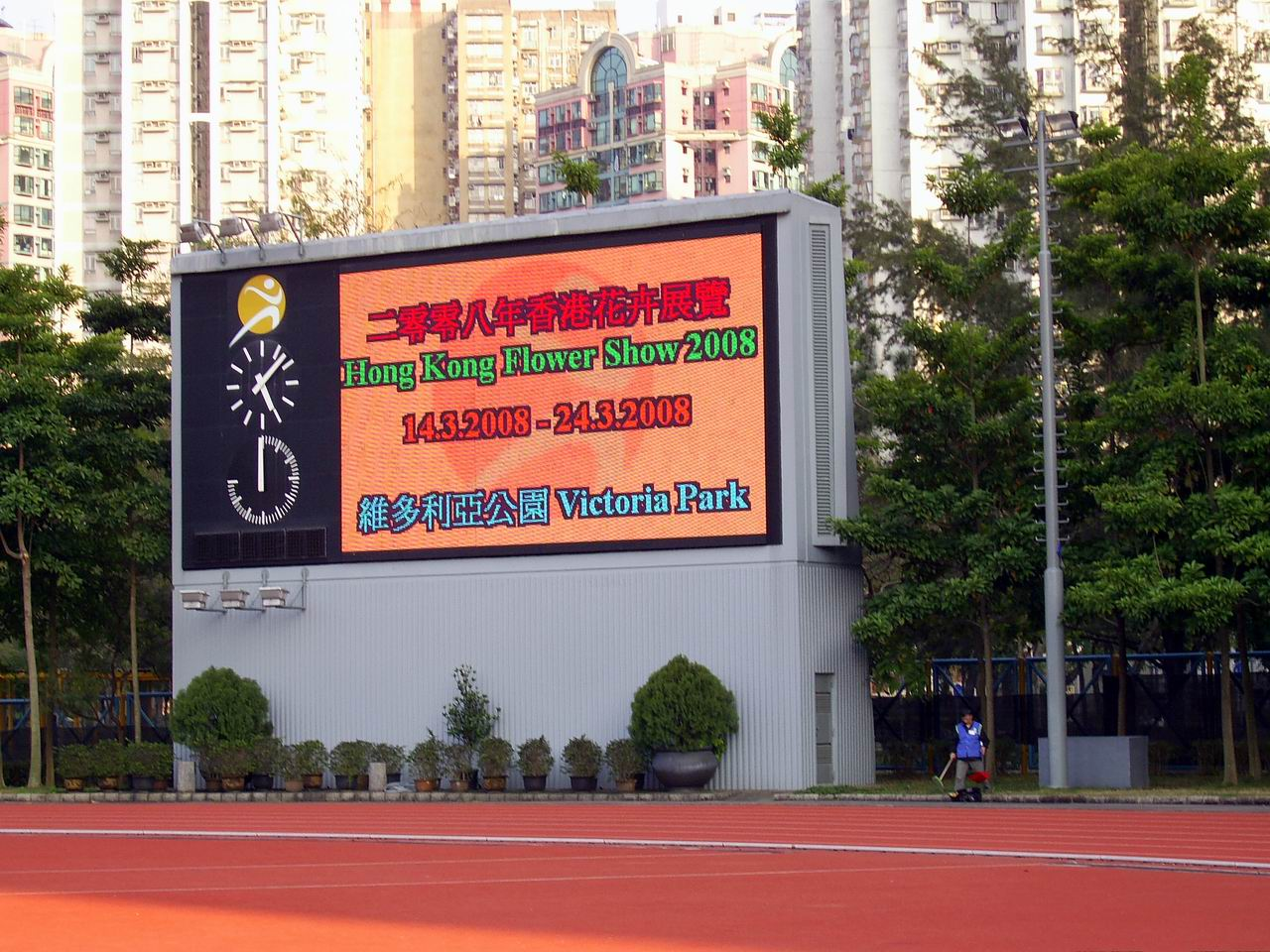
Electronic scoreboard

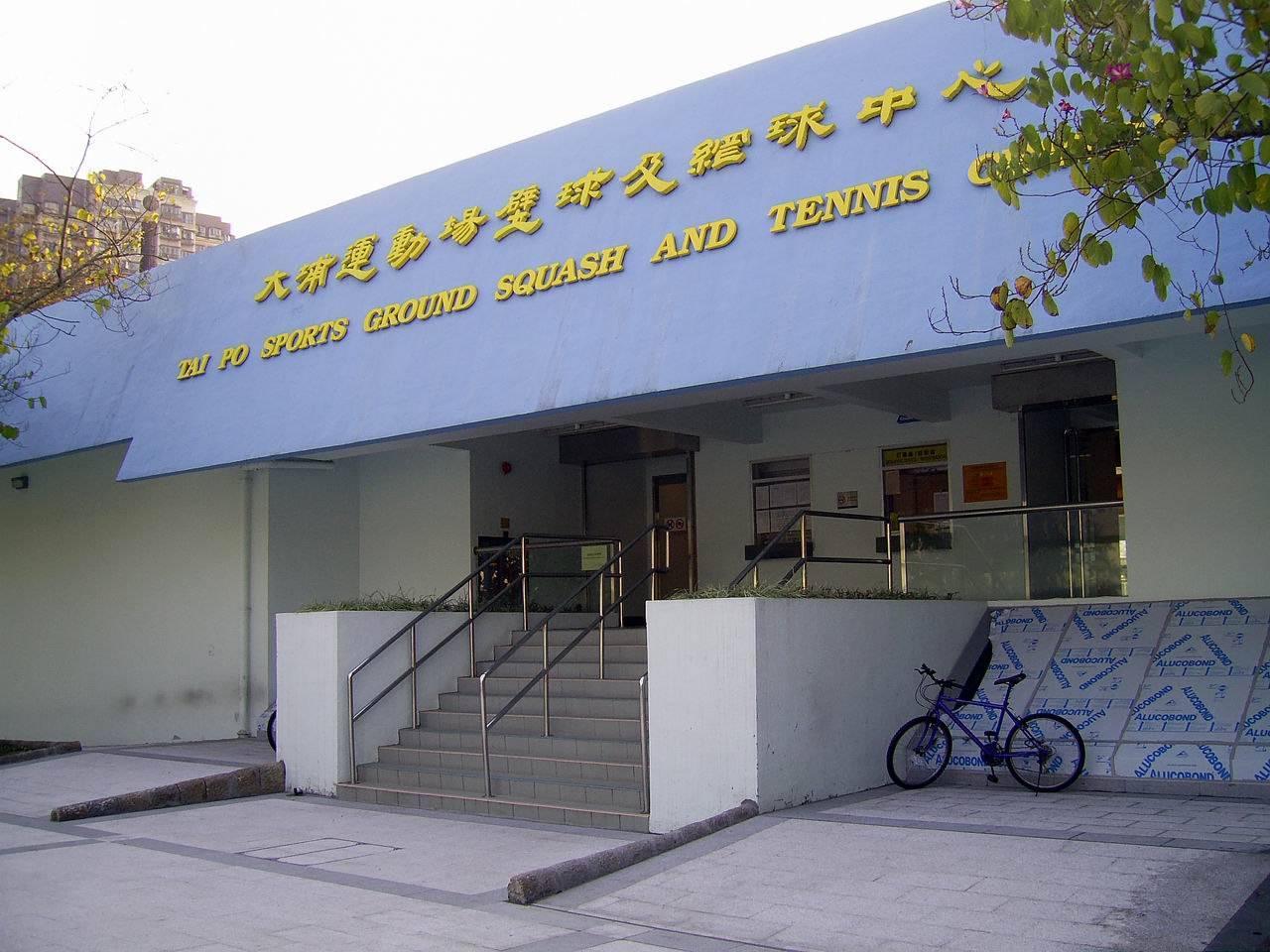
Squash and tennis centres

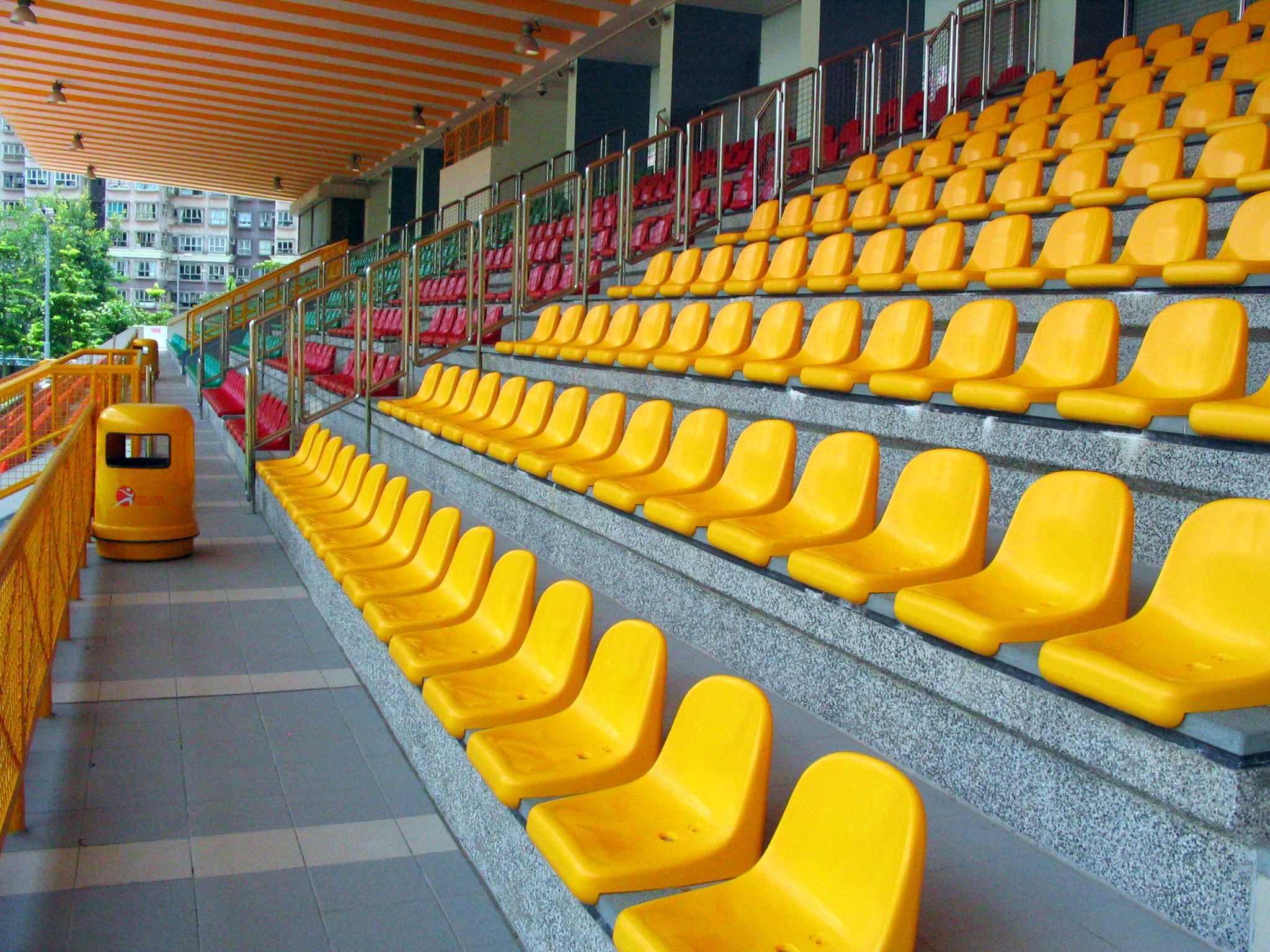
Seats in the grandstand

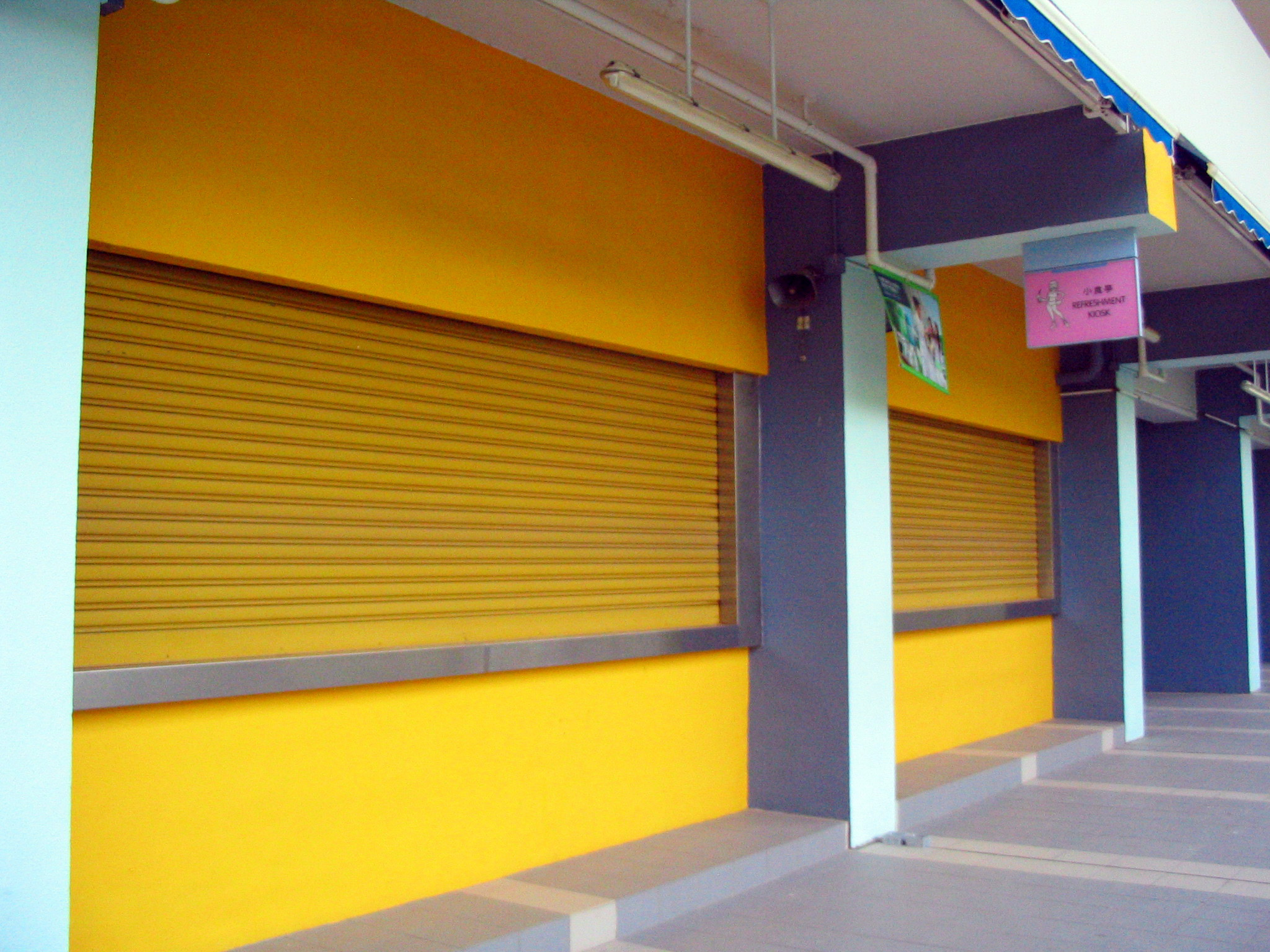
Fast food kiosk
