= Li Shu Yeung =

Hong Kong footballer (born 1991)

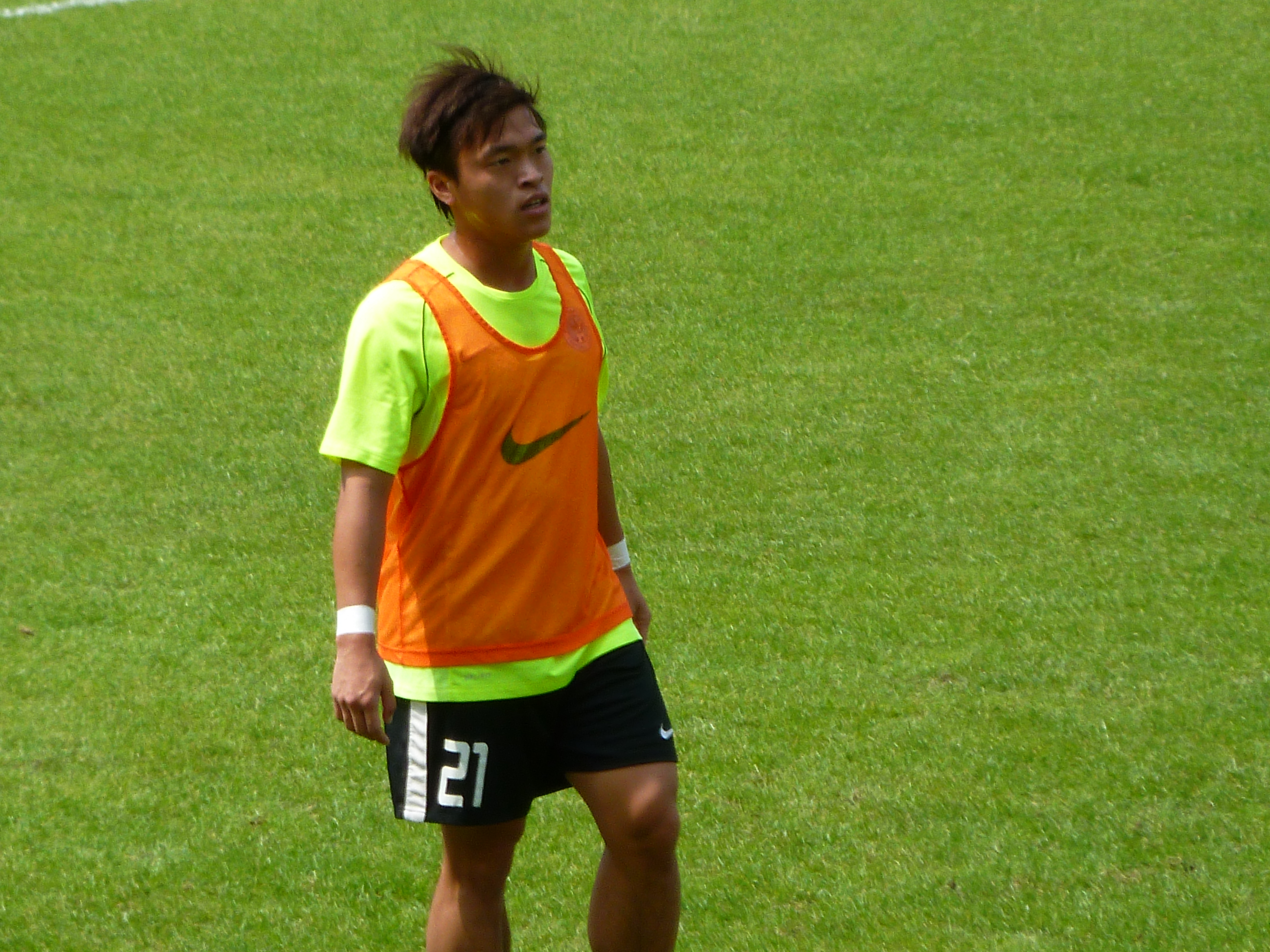

Personal information
- Full name: Li Shu Yeung
- Date of birth: 2 May 1991 (age 35)
- Place of birth: Hong Kong
- Height: 1.63 m (5 ft 4 in)
- Positions: Right-back; right midfielder

Team information
- Current team: South China

Youth career
- 2008–2009: Tai Po

Senior career*
Years	Team	Apps	(Gls)
2009–2010	Tai Chung		
2010–2012	Yuen Long		
2011–2012	→ Hong Kong Sapling (Loan)	10	(0)
2012–2013	Tai Po	17	(1)
2013–2014	Yokohama FC Hong Kong	17	(0)
2014–2017	Citizen	73	(15)
2017–2018	Tung Sing	27	(2)
2019	South China	12	(2)
2019–2020	Wing Yee	10	(0)
2020–2023	North District	36	(0)
2023–2024	Sai Kung	6	(0)
2025–	Sun Hei		

International career
2012	Hong Kong U-23	3	(0)
- * Club domestic league appearances and goals as of 17 May 2026

Li Shu Yeung (Chinese: 李樹烊; Jyutping: lei^{5} syu^{6} joeng^{4}, born 2 May 1991, in Hong Kong) is a Hong Kong former professional footballer. He played as a right-back.

== Club career ==
=== Early career ===
Li was a youth player at Tai Po and he also played for Hong Kong in the Chinese National Games.

=== Tai Chung ===
He left Tai Po and joined Tai Chung in the summer of 2009.

=== Yuen Long ===
One season later, after Tai Chung released him, he moved to Yuen Long in 2010 to play in the 2010-11 Hong Kong Second Division League.

He joined Tung Chi Ying School's football academy scheme, which is jointly organised by the school and Kitchee. He was repeating F5 and only expected to get 2 to 3 points in the HKCEE. He hoped that by joining the scheme he could continue his studies and play football at the same time.

With Yan Chai Tung Chi Ying Memorial Secondary School football team, Li won the Inter-school title as well as the Most Valuable Player award in the Inter-school football tournament. He already planned to become a football coach in the future and has enrolled for a football coach training course.

In April 2011, Li got the chance from Kitchee and Tung Chi Ying to train in Lloret de Mar, Spain with two other young players.

=== Hong Kong Sapling ===
Li was loaned to Hong Kong Sapling in the 2011–12 season. He was sent off after two bookable offences in the 6–0 defeat away to Kitchee. He returned to Yuen Long at the end of the season.

=== Tai Po ===
Li left Yuen Long and re-joined First Division club Tai Po in the summer of 2012. However, his impressive performance during the season could not avoid Tai Po's relegation to the Second Division.

=== Yokohama FC Hong Kong ===
On 7 June 2013, Li joined fellow First Division club Yokohama FC Hong Kong for free.

== International career ==
Li is a member of the Hong Kong national under-23 football team.

== Career statistics ==
=== International ===
==== Hong Kong U23 ====
As of 3 July 2012

#	Date	Venue	Opponent	Result	Scored	Captain	Competition
1	16 June 2012	Macau Stadium, Macau	Macau	3–1	0		2012 Hong Kong–Macau Interport
2	23 June 2012	Chao Anouvong Stadium, Vientiane, Laos	Cambodia	2–3	0		2013 AFC U-22 Championship qualification
3	28 June 2012	Chao Anouvong Stadium, Vientiane, Laos	North Korea	0–1	0		2013 AFC U-22 Championship qualification

== Personal life ==
Li's elder brother Li Shu-Sun is also a football player who played for Tai Chung in the 2010-11 Hong Kong First Division League season. The siblings' father Li Fat Fai died of a toxic gas accident while working in a dock in Tsing Yi on 31 March 2007.
