= Clayton (footballer, born 1988) =

Hong Kong football player

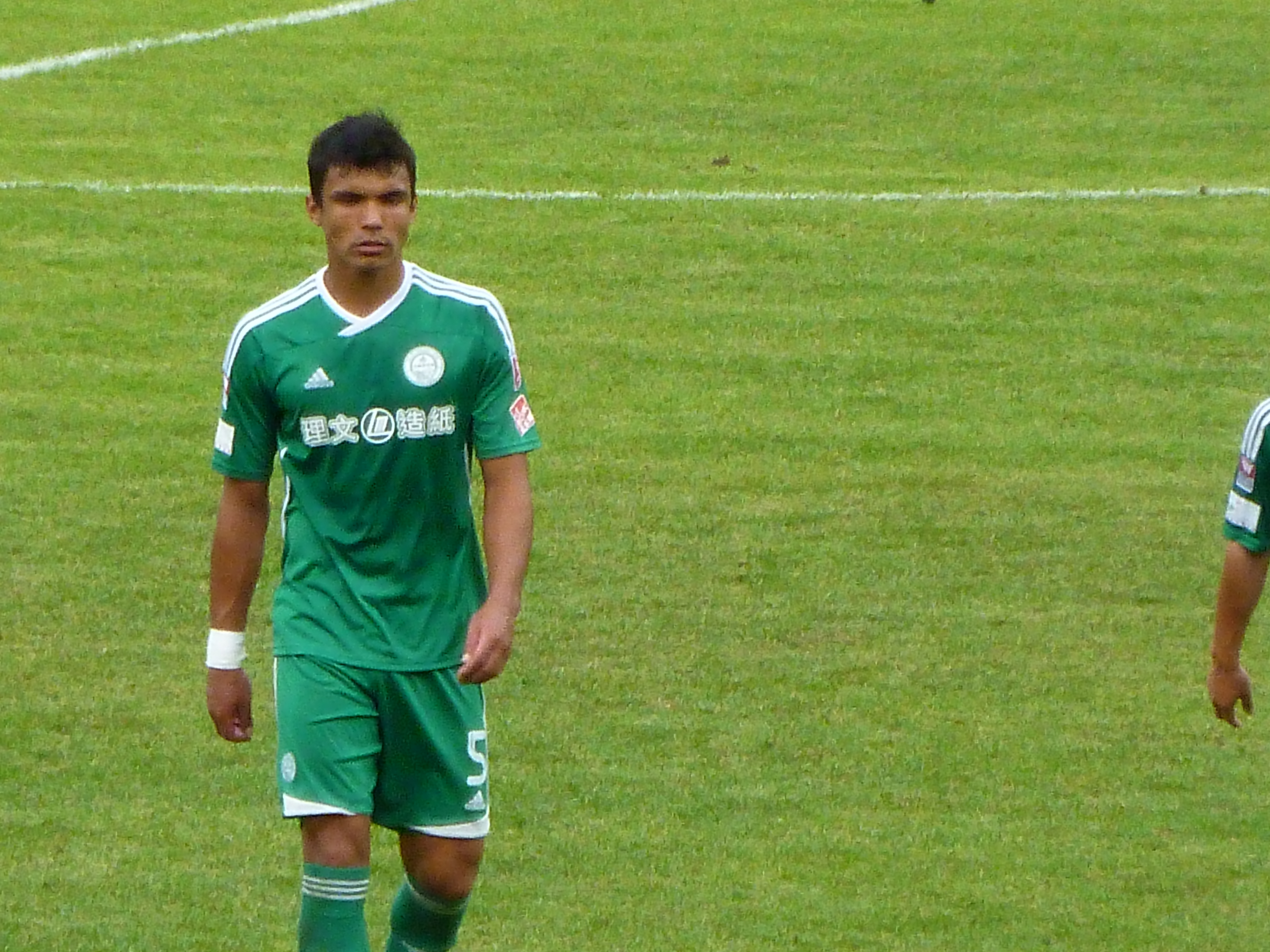
- Clayton in training with Hong Kong in May 2021

Personal information
- Full name: Clayton Michel Afonso
- Date of birth: 18 July 1988 (age 38)
- Place of birth: Brasília, Brazil
- Height: 1.94 m (6 ft 4 in)
- Position: Centre back

Team information
- Current team: Corinthian-Casuals
- Number: 5

Senior career*
Years	Team	Apps	(Gls)
2008–2009	Londrina		
2009	Shizuoka		
2010	Unsommet		
2010–2013	Tai Po	52	(4)
2013–2022	Eastern	76	(12)
2014–2015	→ Tai Po (loan)	12	(0)
2015	→ Metro Gallery (loan)	6	(1)
2016–2017	→ Rangers (HKG) (loan)	23	(4)
2022–2024	St. Panteleimon	0	(0)
2024–	Hillingdon Borough	0	(0)

International career^{‡}
2021	Hong Kong	1	(0)
- * Club domestic league appearances and goals as of 4 October 2022 ‡ National team caps and goals as of 15 June 2021

Clayton Michel Afonso (Chinese: 基頓, born 18 July 1988), commonly known simply as Clayton, is a professional footballer who currently plays for Corinthian-Casuals. Born in Brazil, he has represented Hong Kong internationally.

== Club career ==
On 31 May 2022, Clayton left Eastern after finishing his contract with the club.

== International career ==
Having stayed in Hong Kong for more than seven years, Clayton received his Hong Kong passport in 2017, making him eligible to represent the national team.

On 17 May 2021, Clayton was named within the 25-man squad by Mixu Paatelainen for the AFC World Cup qualifiers against Iran, Iraq and Bahrain.

On 15 June 2021, Clayton made his international debut for Hong Kong in the match against Bahrain in the AFC World Cup Qualifiers.

== Career statistics ==
=== International ===
As of matches played 15 June 2021.

National team	Year	Apps	Goals
Hong Kong	2021	1	0
Total		1	0

== Honours ==
=== Club ===
Eastern

- Hong Kong Senior Shield: 2019–20
- Hong Kong FA Cup: 2019–20

Tai Po

- Hong Kong FA Cup: 2012–13
