= Cheung Po Chun =

Hong Kong footballer and coach

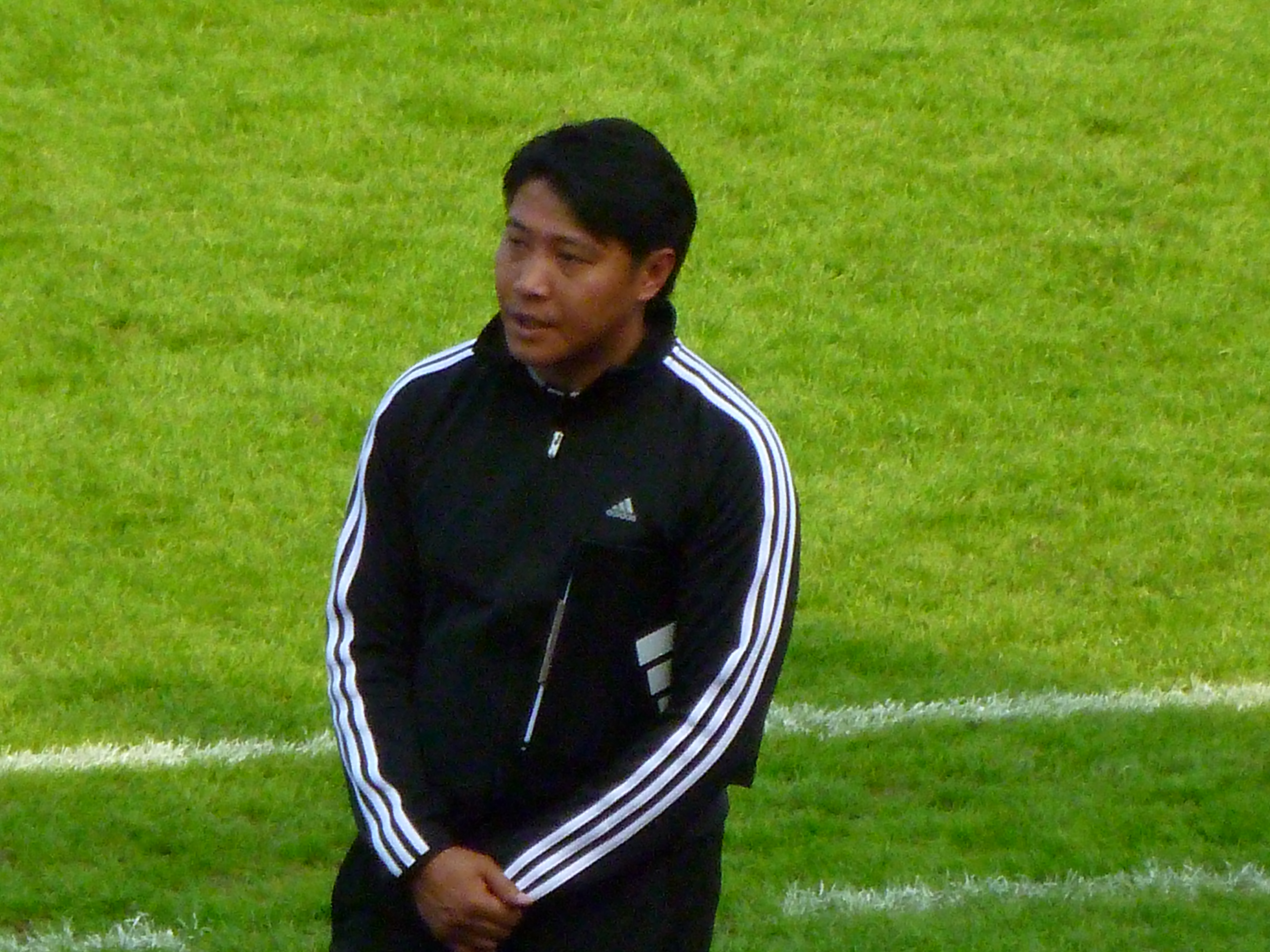

Personal information
- Full name: Cheung Po Chun
- Date of birth: 11 May 1971 (age 55)
- Place of birth: Hong Kong
- Position: Goalkeeper

Team information
- Current team: Kitchee Women Football team

Youth career
- 1977–1978: May Ching
- 1988–1989: South China
- 1988–1989: Rangers (HKG)
- 1989–1990: Happy Valley

Senior career*
| Years | Team | Apps | (Gls) |
| 1990–1992 | Sing Tao | | |
| 1992–1993 | Michelotti | 2 | (0) |
| 1993–1998 | Police | | |

International career
| 1989–1991 | Hong Kong U-21 | | |

Managerial career
- 2009–2013: Wofoo Tai Po
- 2013–2014: South China
- 2014–2015: Rangers
- 2015–2016: Wofoo Tai Po (director)
- 2016–2017: Wong Tai Sin
- 2020–2021: Pegasus (assistant coach)
- 2021–: Kitchee Women Football team
- * Club domestic league appearances and goals

Cheung Po Chun (Chinese: 張寶春; Cantonese Yale: Jēung Bóuchēun; born 11 May 1971 in Hong Kong) is a Hong Kong former professional footballer.

== Career ==
Cheung Po Chun was a goalkeeper when he was a footballer. He spent his youth career at numbers of clubs.

In 1990, Cheung Po Chun was playing at Sing Tao. He was promoted to the first team from the youth team. However, he didn't have too much chances after being promoted to the first team.

In April 1991, he was selected to represent the Hong Kong U-21 team as a third choice goalkeeper. Chung Ho Yin and Lee Chun Fat was the first and second choice.

In 1992, as he wanted to get first team chances, he decided to transfer to Michelotti. However, he had only played Michelotti for 2 games.

In 1993, he chose to become a police. During his police career, he represented Police football team.

== Coaching career ==
In the 2008–09 season, he was selected to be the head coach of Tai Po. He helped the team to win the Hong Kong FA Cup and qualified for the 2009 AFC Cup in the first season.

On 6 June 2020, Cheung was announced as a fitness coach for Pegasus.
