= Sze Kin Wai =

Hong Kong footballer

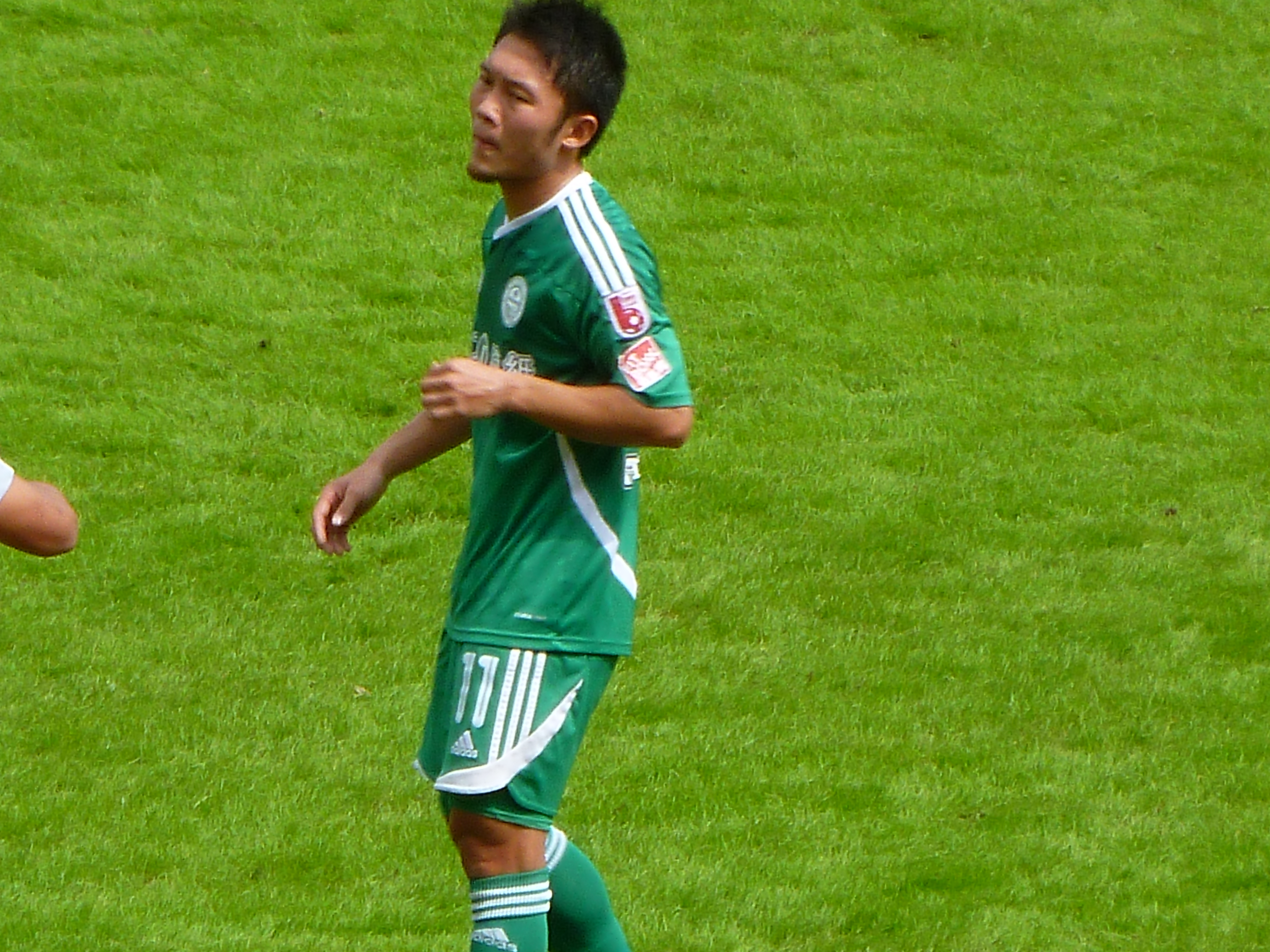

Personal information
- Full name: Sze Kin Wai
- Date of birth: 6 December 1984 (age 41)
- Place of birth: Hong Kong
- Height: 1.65 m (5 ft 5 in)
- Position: Defensive midfielder

Youth career
- 2000–2002: Rangers

Senior career*
Years	Team	Apps	(Gls)
2002–2012	Tai Po	66	(5)
2013–2016	Tai Po	31	(2)
2016–2020	Mutual		
2020–2023	Tai Po	36	(0)
2023–2025	WSE	38	(2)
2025–	Double Flower		
- * Club domestic league appearances and goals as of 17 May 2026

Sze Kin Wai (Chinese: 史建威; born 6 December 1984) is a former Hong Kong professional footballer who played as a defensive midfielder.

== Club career ==
Sze is considered to be one of the most prominent players of Tai Po of all time.

In May 2023, Sze announced his retirement from professional football.

== Honours ==
Tai Po

- Hong Kong Third District Division League: 2003–04
- Hong Kong FA Cup: 2008–09
