= Christian Annan =

Hong Kong footballer

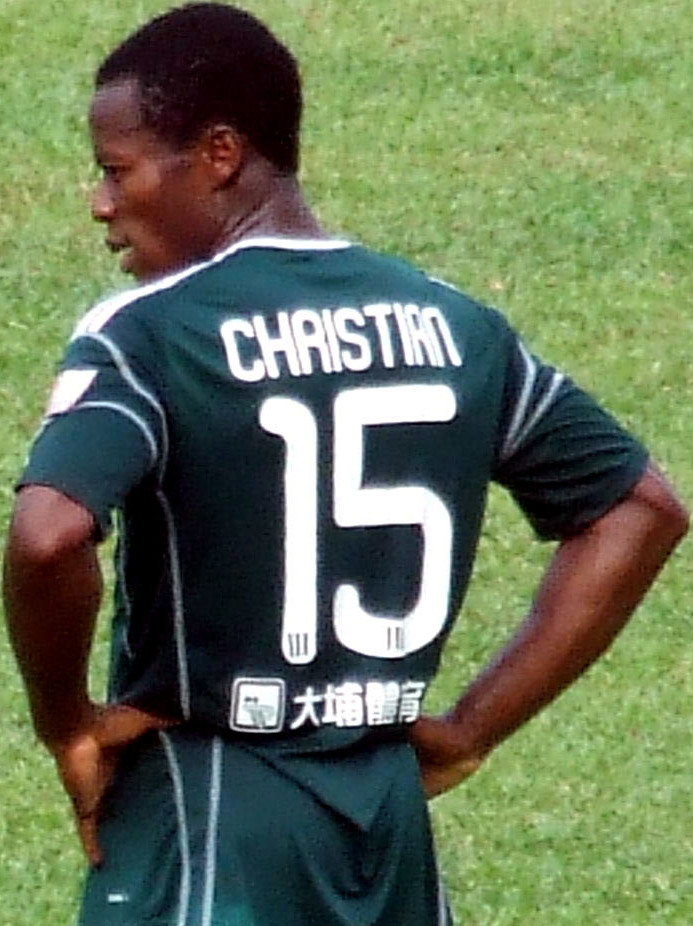

Personal information
- Full name: Christian Kwesi Annan
- Date of birth: 3 May 1978 (age 48)
- Place of birth: Accra, Ghana
- Height: 1.65 m (5 ft 5 in)
- Positions: Striker; left winger

Team information
- Current team: Hoi King

Senior career*
Years	Team	Apps	(Gls)
2005–2006	Eastern	11	(14)
2006–2013	Tai Po	124	(42)
2013–2019	Kitchee	36	(8)
2016–2017	→ Pegasus (loan)	19	(2)
2018–2019	→ Hoi King (loan)	16	(5)
2019–2020	Hong Kong Rangers	9	(0)
2020–2021	Yuen Long	13	(8)
2021–2022	Tai Po	13	(9)
2022–2025	Central & Western	66	(22)
2025–	Hoi King	24	(13)
2014	Hong Kong U23	3	(1)
2014–2016	Hong Kong	13	(1)
- * Club domestic league appearances and goals as of 12 July 2022 ‡ National team caps and goals as of 1 September 2016

Christian Kwesi Annan (Chinese: 安基斯; born 3 May 1978) is a former professional footballer who played as a striker or left winger. Born in Ghana, he represented Hong Kong at international level. He is renowned in Hong Kong for his high pace and dribbling skill.

== Club career ==
=== Eastern ===
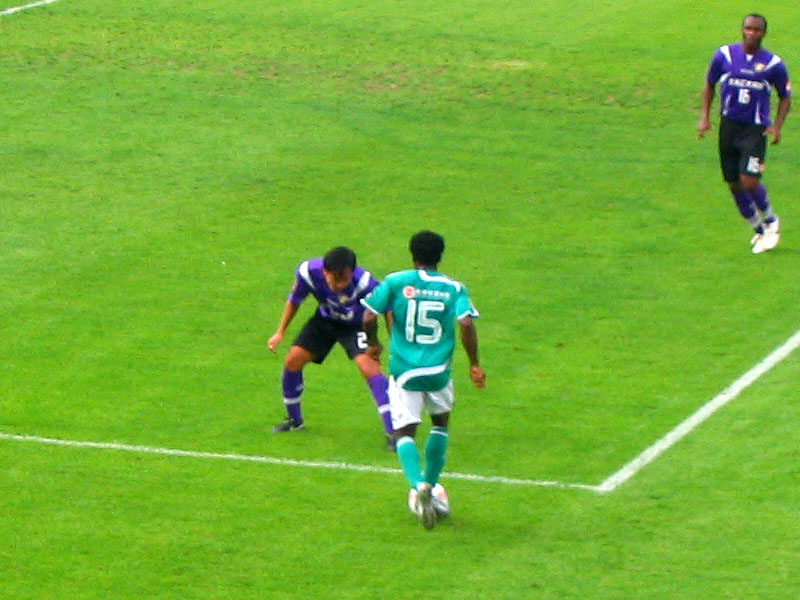
Annan trying to go past Fung Ka Ki of Mutual in a league game

Annan arrived in Hong Kong to continue his football career in 2005. He arrived at a time when most clubs in the First Division had already finished their foreign player signings, and so he joined Eastern, a Second Division club instead.

With 14 goals in 11 matches, including a hat trick against Tai Po, Annan gained the attention of his then opponent. When Tai Po obtained their promotion status after the 2005–06 season, they signed Annan immediately.

=== Tai Po ===
Although he did not have the same impact in front of goal when compared to his time in the Second Division, Annan bagged 6 goals in 21 matches and became Tai Po's top scorer (along with defender Joel), helping the team avoid relegation. His performances were also thrown into the limelight with his selection into the Hong Kong League XI for the Lunar New Year Cup 2007. With only a brief appearance in the first match against Jamaica, Annan started the next match against Australia U-23, was fouled in the box, gaining a penalty for his team which ultimately tied the match (penalty scored by Keith Gumbs) in injury time.

His contribution on Tai Po has been further rewarded: he was selected into the 2006–07 Squad of the Year in the Hong Kong Footballer Awards.

In season 2007–08, Annan kept performing and being selected into the first squad of Hong Kong League XI for the Lunar New Year Cup 2008. He only dropped out of the final selection due to the overload of attacking players. He scored 7 goals in the season, being named the second top league scorer of the team along with striking partner Betine, behind Dega.

In the 2011–12 season, on 18 September 2011, Annan appeared as a second-half substitute and scored twice against Kitchee, but Tai Po still lost the game, 4–2.

=== Kitchee ===
On 9 June 2013, Annan joined Kitchee on a free transfer along with his former Tai Po strike partner Alex. On 3 September 2013, Annan made his debut for Kitchee in a 6–2 victory against Sun Hei. On 19 October 2013, Annan scored his first goal for Kitchee by netting the winner in a 1–0 victory against Yokohama FC Hong Kong.

On 12 July 2017, Annan was recalled from loan after he spent the 2016–17 season at Pegasus.

=== Hong Kong League XI ===
On 18 July 2010, Annan was selected into Hong Kong League Selection against Birmingham City in the Hong Kong Stadium. He scored a goal in the match and was the MVP of the match. After the match, it was rumoured that the manager of Birmingham City Alex McLeish was interested in signing Annan.

=== Hoi King ===
On 20 August 2018, Annan was sent on loan to fellow HKPL side Hoi King.

=== Rangers ===
On 28 August 2019, Annan joined Rangers.

He played 17 matches for Rangers during the 2019–20 season including league and cup games, before the HKPL was suspended from mid of March 2020 due to the COVID-19 pandemic.

=== Tai Po ===
In August 2021, Annan returned to Tai Po.

== International career ==
On 12 February 2014, after residing in Hong Kong for more than 7 years, Annan was granted the HKSAR passport, making him eligible for the Hong Kong national football team. He made his international debut for Hong Kong in the 2015 AFC Asian Cup qualifiers against Vietnam on 5 March 2014. He scored his first international goal for Hong Kong against Bhutan on 11 June 2015 in a 2018 FIFA World Cup qualifier.

== Career statistics ==
=== Club ===
As of 12 July 2017

Appearances and goals by club, season and competition
Club	Season	League			National cup (Note: Includes FA Cup, Shield.)		League cup (Note: Includes LC, Hong Kong season play-offs.)		Continental		Total	
Club	Season	Division	Apps	Goals	Apps	Goals	Apps	Goals	Apps	Goals	Apps	Goals
Eastern	2005–06	Hong Kong Second Division League	8	14	3	0	–		–		11	14
Tai Po	2006–07	Hong Kong First Division League	15	5	2	0	4	1	–		21	6
Tai Po	2007–08	Hong Kong First Division League	18	7	4	0	4	0	–		26	7
Tai Po	2008–09	Hong Kong First Division League	23	9	4	2	2	1	–		29	12
Tai Po	2009–10	Hong Kong First Division League	18	3	4	1	–		6	1	28	5
Tai Po	2010–11	Hong Kong First Division League	18	4	6	4	1	0	–		25	8
Tai Po	2011–12	Hong Kong First Division League	15	7	5	4	1	0	–		21	11
Tai Po	2012–13	Hong Kong First Division League	17	7	11	7	1	0	–		29	14
Tai Po	Total		124	42	36	18	13	2	6	1	179	63
Kitchee	2013–14	Hong Kong First Division League	18	6	5	0	0	0	0	0	23	6
Kitchee	2014–15	Hong Kong Premier League	9	1	4	1	2	1	7	0	22	3
Kitchee	2015–16	Hong Kong Premier League	5	0	0	0	4	2	9	0	18	0
Kitchee	Total		32	7	9	1	6	3	16	0	63	11
Pegasus	2016–17	Hong Kong Premier League	19	2	3	0	–		–		22	2
Kitchee	2017–18	Hong Kong Premier League	0	0	0	0	0	0	0	0	0	0
Career total		183	65	51	19	19	5	22	1	275	90	

=== International ===
As of 1 September 2016

Appearances and goals by national team and year
National team	Year	Apps	Goals
Hong Kong	2014	8	0
Hong Kong	2015	4	1
Hong Kong	2016	1	0
Total		13	1

As of 5 March 2014

#	Date	Venue	Opponent	Result	Scored	Competition
1	5 March 2014	Mỹ Đình National Stadium, Hanoi, Vietnam	Vietnam	1–3	0	2015 AFC Asian Cup qualification

Scores and results list Hong Kong's goal tally first.

No	Date	Venue	Opponent	Score	Result	Competition
1.	11 June 2015	Mong Kok Stadium, Mong Kok, Hong Kong	Bhutan	2–0	7–0	2018 FIFA World Cup qualification

== Honours ==
Tai Po

- Hong Kong Senior Shield: 2012–13
- Hong Kong FA Cup: 2008–09

Kitchee

- Hong Kong Premier League: 2014–15, 2017–18
- Hong Kong First Division: 2013–14
- Hong Kong FA Cup: 2014–15, 2017–18
- Hong Kong Sapling Cup: 2017–18
- Hong Kong League Cup: 2014–15, 2015–16

Individual

- Hong Kong Top Footballers: 2006–07
