= Ye Jia =

Hong Kong footballer

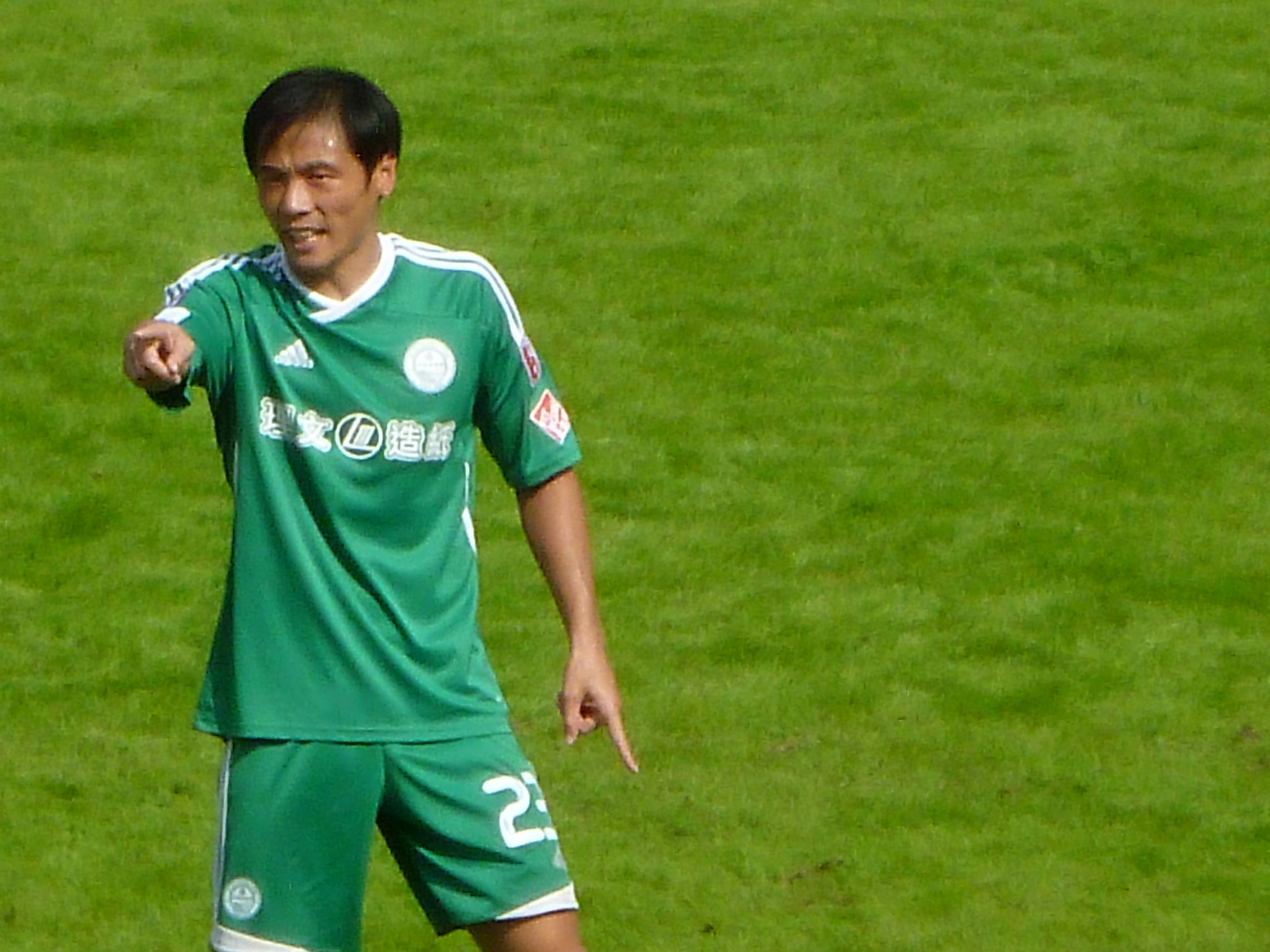
- Jia playing for Tai Po in 2012

Personal information
- Full name: Ye Jia
- Date of birth: 1 December 1981 (age 44)
- Place of birth: Shanghai, China
- Height: 1.80 m (5 ft 11 in)
- Positions: Midfielder; striker

Youth career
- 2002: Shanghai Tianna

Senior career*
Years	Team	Apps	(Gls)
2003–2006	Shanghai The 9		
2006–2007	Hong Kong Rangers	6	(1)
2007–2017	Tai Po	173	(36)
2019–2020	South China	12	(10)
2020–2021	WSE		
2021–2022	Tai Po	12	(4)
2022–2025	WSE	38	(18)
2025–2026	Wing Yee	18	(20)

International career
2010–2011	Hong Kong	6	(0)

Managerial career
- 2022–2023: Tai Po (assistant coach)
- * Club domestic league appearances and goals as of 31 May 2026

Ye Jia
- Traditional Chinese: 葉佳
- Simplified Chinese: 叶佳
Transcriptions
Standard Mandarin
- Hanyu Pinyin: Yè Jiā
Yue: Cantonese
- Jyutping: Jip6 Gaai1

Ye Jia (simplified Chinese: 叶佳; traditional Chinese: 葉佳; pinyin: Yè Jiā; Jyutping: jip^{6} gaai^{1}, born 1 December 1981) is a former professional footballer who played as an attacking midfielder or a striker. Born in China, he represented Hong Kong internationally.

== Early career ==
Born in Shanghai, Ye began his football career for amateur club Shanghai Tianna in 2002. After a season, his club was bought by another local side, Shanghai The 9 in China League Two. Thus, Ye became a professional footballer.

== Club career ==
=== Shanghai The 9 ===
As his first professional team experience, Ye did not contemplate breaking into the first team immediately but looked up to senior players like Ebelio Ordóñez. He always was a substitution player in league matches.

=== Tai Po ===
In the 2007–08 season, Tai Po was the finalist of the FA Cup. Ye scored an important goal for the club against South China and brought the club to the final. This is the first time the club has been the finalist in the FA Cup.

Tai Po got 3 straight wins against Tuen Mun Progoal, Sheffield United and Pegasus in the 2008–09 season. As Ye was suspended for the first match, he played as a striker in the next 2 matches, giving 2 assists and a goal for the club. He also scored for the club in the semi-finals of the FA Cup against Kitchee and Tai Po got into the final.

In the 2009–10 season, Ye scored 7 goals in the first 6 matches. Moreover, in the match against Tuen Mun Progoal, he scored 4 goals.

=== South China ===
At the beginning of the 2019–20 season, Ye joined South China as an amateur player.

== International career ==
As a Chinese national, according to the FIFA Statues, he became eligible for the Hong Kong national football team following two years of residency in Hong Kong. Hong Kong's coach Tsang Wai Chung selected Ye for the training section before the start of the 2010–11 season.

On 4 October 2010, Ye made his international debut for Hong Kong in a friendly match against India.

== Honours ==
Tai Po

- Hong Kong First Division: 2013–14, 2015–16
- Hong Kong FA Cup: 2008–09
- Hong Kong Senior Shield: 2012–13
