= Chan Sze Wing =

Hong Kong footballer

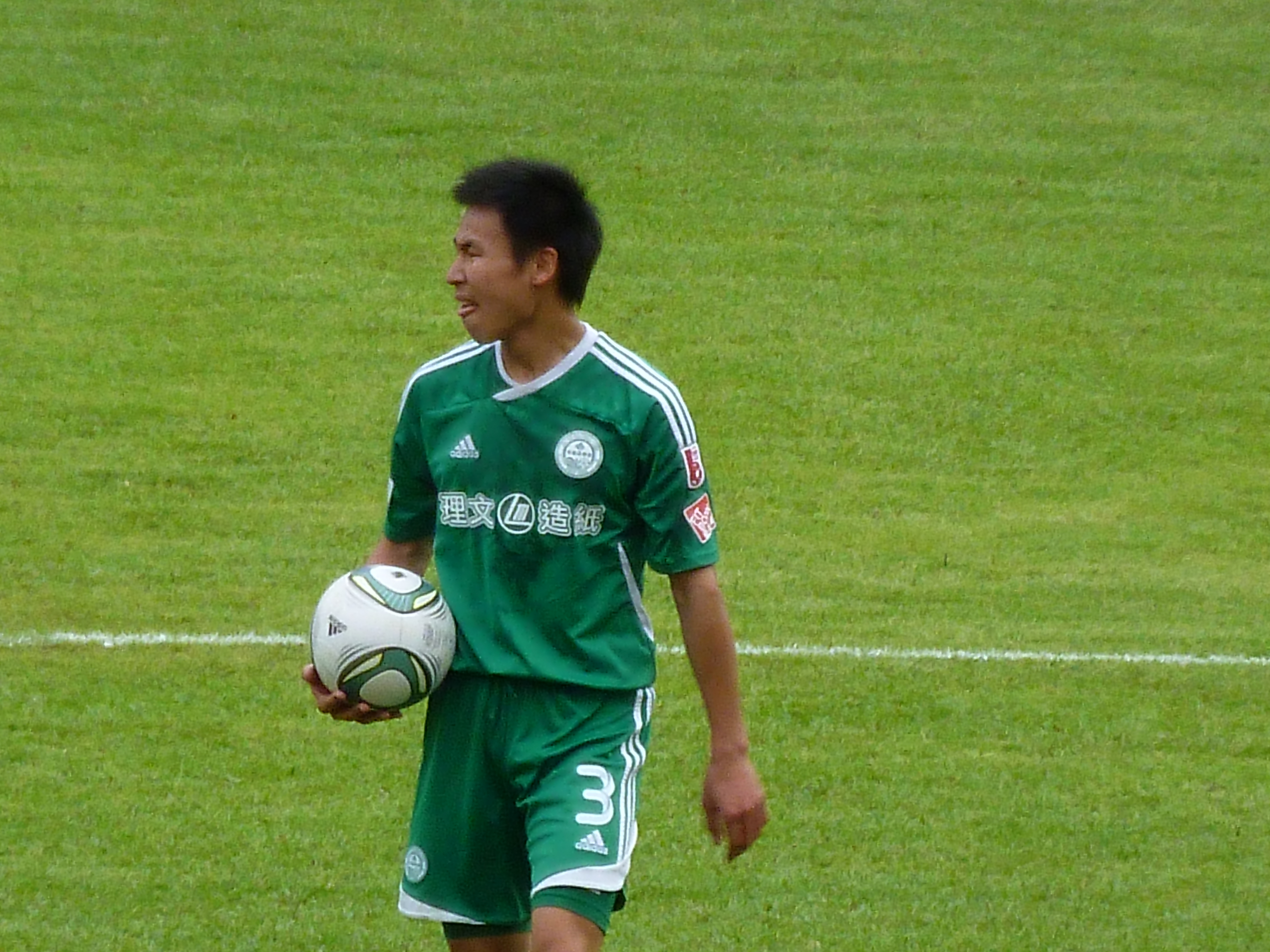

Personal information
- Full name: Chan Sze Wing
- Date of birth: 23 March 1983 (age 43)
- Place of birth: Hong Kong
- Height: 1.73 m (5 ft 8 in)
- Positions: Left back; left midfielder

Senior career*
Years	Team	Apps	(Gls)
1999–2001	Orient & Yee Hope Union		
2001–2003	Hong Kong Rangers		
2003–2004	South China		
2004–2015	Tai Po		
- * Club domestic league appearances and goals as of 18 December 2011

Chan Sze Wing (Chinese: 陳思榮; Cantonese Yale: Chàn Sīwihng; born 23 March 1983 in Hong Kong), is a former footballer from Hong Kong who last played for Hong Kong First Division League club Tai Po as a left back and a left midfielder.

== Club career ==
Chan joined the Hong Kong Sports Institute when he was studying at primary 6. However, the Hong Kong Sports Institute was dissolved four years later. He decided to join Orient & Yee Hope Union. Two years later, he joined Rangers. At first, he only got chances at the reserves team. In 2000, he was promoted to the first team.

In 2001, Chan decided to play for South China reserves, only as a part-time player.

Two years later, Chan transferred to Third Division League club Tai Po. He helped Tai Po to promote to the Hong Kong First Division League. However, even the team was competing at Hong Kong First Division League, he was still a part-time player.

On 6 June 2009, he helped Tai Po to win the Hong Kong FA Cup, after beating TSW Pegasus. He said that it was very difficult to play as a part-time player. He said that his family's support was a great power to continue his football career.

== Playing style ==
Chan plays as a left midfielder or left wing. He also plays long balls well.
