= Lui Chi Hing =

Former Hong Kong footballer

Lui Chi Hing 呂志興
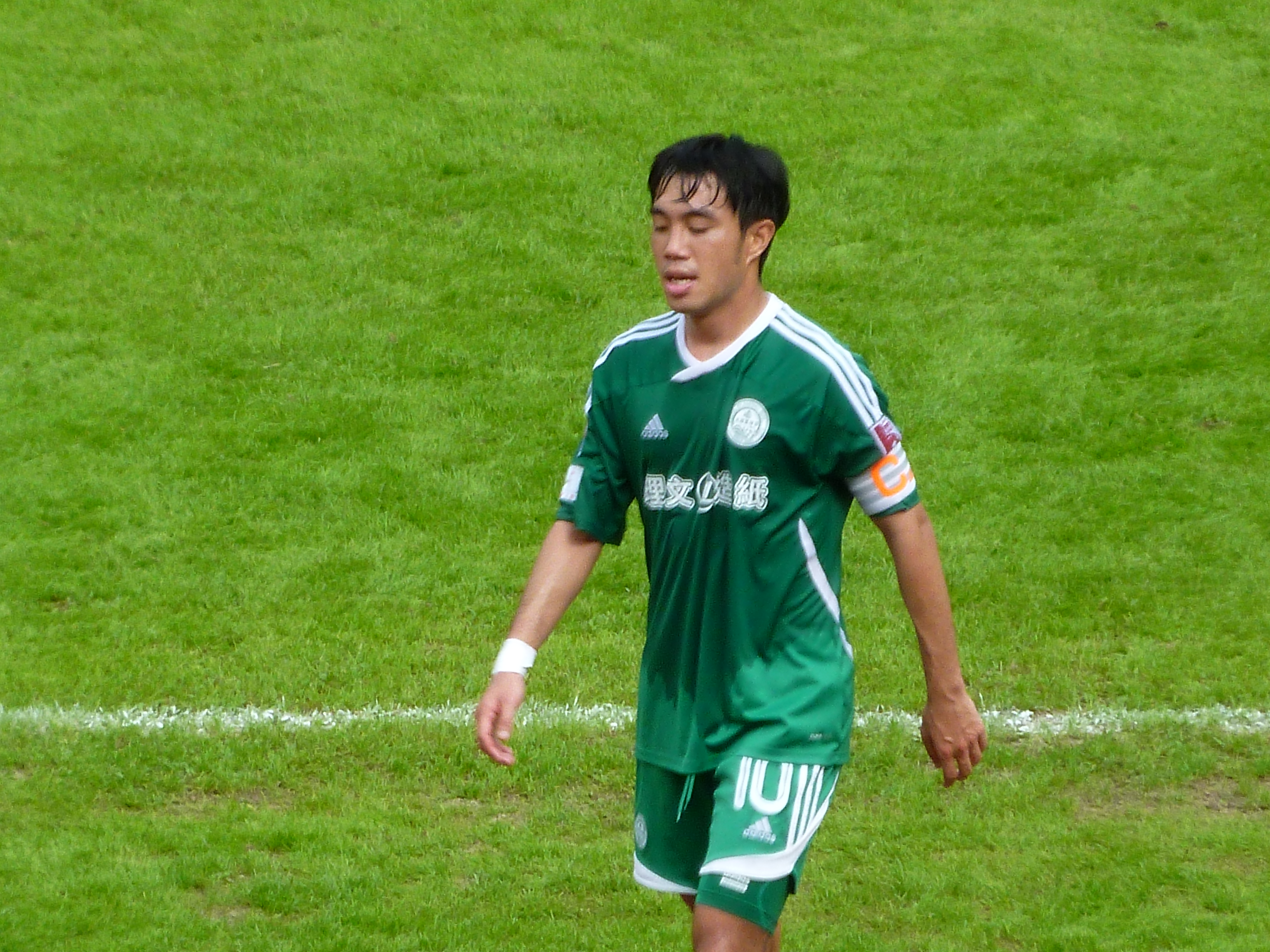

Personal information
- Full name: Lui Chi Hing
- Date of birth: 10 January 1984 (age 42)
- Place of birth: Tai Po, Hong Kong
- Height: 1.82 m (6 ft 0 in)
- Positions: Centre back; defensive midfielder

Youth career
- 1999–2001: Rangers

Senior career*
Years	Team	Apps	(Gls)
2001–2003	Rangers		
2003–2018	Tai Po	184	(7)
2020–2022	WSE		

International career
- Hong Kong U-20

Managerial career
- 2018–2020: Tai Po (assistant coach)
- 2022–2023: Tai Po (assistant coach)
- * Club domestic league appearances and goals

Lui Chi Hing (Chinese: 呂志興, born 10 January 1984) is a former Hong Kong professional footballer who played as a centre back or a defensive midfielder.

== Honours ==
Tai Po

- Hong Kong Third District Division League: 2003–04
- Hong Kong FA Cup: 2008–09
- Hong Kong Senior Challenge Shield: 2012–13
- Hong Kong Sapling Cup: 2016–17
