= 2012–13 Yokohama FC Hong Kong season =

Yokohama FC Hong Kong
2012–13 season
- Chairman: Hiroshi Onodera
- Head Coach: Lee Chi Kin
- Home ground: Siu Sai Wan Sports Ground
- First Division: 9th
- Senior Shield: First round
- FA Cup: Quarter-finals
- Top goalscorer: League: Tsuyoshi Yoshitake (9); All: Tsuyoshi Yoshitake (9)
- Highest home attendance: 1,895 (7 October vs Kitchee, First Division)
- Lowest home attendance: 227 (18 April vs Citizen, First Division)
- Average home league attendance: 701 (in all competitions)
| Home colours | Away colours |

The 2012–13 season is Yokohama FC Hong Kong's debut season in the Hong Kong First Division League. They will be competing in the Hong Kong First Division League, Senior Challenge Shield and the FA Cup.

== Key events ==
- 27 May 2012: Yokohama F.C. confirmed that their youth team will not join the newly formed team Yokohama FC Hong Kong. Instead, all Sham Shui Po players will join the club along with some Japanese player.
- 18 June 2012: Hong Kong goalkeeper Tsang Man Fai, who spent the second-half of last season as a loanee in TSW Pegasus, joined the newly formed Yokohama FC Hong Kong from Rangers for an undisclosed fee.
- 17 July 2012: Yokohama FC Hong Kong confirmed that Mirko Teodorović and Čedomir Mijanović joined the club from Tuen Mun. Serbian defender Aleksandar Brajovic also joined the club from Serbian First League side FK Timok after Mirko and Mijanović suggested the club to sign him.
- 27 July 2012: Japanese attacking midfielder Tsuyoshi Yoshitake confirmed he would join Yokohama FC Hong Kong from North American Soccer League club Tampa Bay Rowdies.
- 12 September 2012: Chinese midfielder Li Jian joins the club on loan from Biu Chun Rangers until the end of the season.
- 20 December 2012: Japanese goalkeeper Taiki Murai joins the club on loan from J2 League club Yokohama F.C. until the end of the season. He will join the club on 1 January 2013.
- 23 January 2013: Japanese forward Kenji Fukuda joins the club from J2 League club Ehime F.C. for an undisclosed fee.
- 4 May 2013: The club survived from the relegation to secure a place for next season's First Division thanks to Kenji Fukuda's stoppage time score.

== Players ==
=== Squad information ===
As of 23 January 2013.

Note: Flags indicate national team as defined under FIFA eligibility rules; some limited exceptions apply. Players may hold more than one non-FIFA nationality.

| No. | Pos. | Nation | Player |
|---|---|---|---|
| 1 | GK | (Hong Kong) HKG | Tsang Man Fai |
| 2 | DF | (Hong Kong) HKG | Lew Wai Yip |
| 3 | DF | (Hong Kong) HKG | Jason Jeyam |
| 4 | MF | (Hong Kong) HKG | Ryan Cuenca |
| 5 | DF | (Hong Kong) HKG | Leung Kwun Chung |
| 7 | MF | (Hong Kong) HKG | Lee Ka Ho |
| 8 | MF | (Hong Kong) HKG | Lee Ka Yiu |
| 9 | FW | (Hong Kong) HKG | Lo Kong Wai |
| 10 | MF | (Hong Kong) HKG | Lau Cheuk Hin |
| 14 | FW | (Hong Kong) HKG | Fong Pak Lun |
| 15 | DF | (Hong Kong) HKG | Fung Hing Wa |
| 16 | DF | (Hong Kong) HKG | Lam Ngai Tong |
| 17 | FW | (Hong Kong) HKG | Hui Wang Fung |

| No. | Pos. | Nation | Player |
|---|---|---|---|
| 18 | MF | (Japan) JPN | Tsuyoshi Yoshitake (captain) |
| 19 | FW | (Hong Kong) HKG | Michael Anthony Wu |
| 20 | FW | (Japan) JPN | Kenji Fukuda |
| 21 | GK | (Japan) JPN | Taiki Murai (on loan from Yokohama F.C.) |
| 22 | MF | (Hong Kong) HKG | Chan Siu Kwan |
| 23 | MF | (Hong Kong) HKG | Wong Wai |
| 24 | MF | (China) CHN | Li Jian |
| 25 | MF | (Serbia) SRB | Mirko Teodorović |
| 30 | GK | (Hong Kong) HKG | To Chun Kiu |
| 31 | DF | (Hong Kong) HKG | Law Chun Bong |
| 32 | DF | (Hong Kong) HKG | Leung Kwok Wai |
| 33 | DF | (Montenegro) MNE | Čedomir Mijanović |

=== Transfers ===
==== In ====
Players who played for Sham Shui Po last season were not listed in the table below.

| Squad # | Position | Player | Transferred from | Fee | Date | Team | Source |
|---|---|---|---|---|---|---|---|
| 1 | GK | (Hong Kong) Tsang Man Fai | (Hong Kong) Biu Chun Rangers | Undisclosed | 18 June 2012 | First Team | |
| 17 | FW | (Hong Kong) Hui Wang Fung | (Hong Kong) Biu Chun Rangers | Undisclosed | | First Team | |
| 18 | MF | (Japan) Tsuyoshi Yoshitake | (United States) Tampa Bay Rowdies | Undisclosed | 27 July 2012 | First Team | |
| 24 | MF | (China) Li Jian | (Hong Kong) Biu Chun Rangers | On Loan | 12 September 2012 | First Team | |
| 25 | MF | (Serbia) Mirko Teodorović | (Hong Kong) Tuen Mun | Undisclosed | 17 July 2012 | First Team | |
| 29 | FW | (Serbia) Aleksandar Brajovic | (Serbia) FK Timok | Undisclosed | 17 July 2012 | First Team | |
| 31 | DF | (Hong Kong) Law Chun Bong | (Hong Kong) Citizen | Free transfer (Released) | | First Team | |
| 32 | DF | (Hong Kong) Leung Kwok Wai | (Hong Kong) Tuen Mun | Undisclosed | 29 June 2012 | First Team | |
| 33 | DF | (Montenegro) Čedomir Mijanović | (Hong Kong) Tuen Mun | Undisclosed | 17 July 2012 | First Team | |
| 21 | GK | (Japan) Taiki Murai | (Japan) Yokohama F.C. | On Loan | 20 December 2012 | First Team | |
| 20 | FW | (Japan) Kenji Fukuda | (Japan) Ehime F.C. | Undisclosed | 21 January 2013 | First Team | |

==== Out ====
| Squad # | Position | Player | Transferred to | Fee | Date | Source |
|---|---|---|---|---|---|---|
| 29 | FW | (Serbia) Aleksandar Brajovic | Unattached(Released) | N/A | | |

== Stats ==
=== Squad Stats ===
| | | | | Total | | | | Hong Kong First Division League | | Senior Challenge Shield | | FA Cup | | |
| N | Pos. | Name | Nat. | GS | App | Gls | Min | App | Gls | App | Gls | App | Gls | Notes |
|---|---|---|---|---|---|---|---|---|---|---|---|---|---|---|
| 1 | GK | Tsang Man Fai | (Hong Kong) | 17 | 17 | -27 | 1507 | 14 | -25 | 2 | -2 | 1 | | (−) GA |
| 21 | GK | Taiki Murai | (Japan) | 5 | 5 | -11 | 450 | 4 | -8 | | | 1 | -3 | (−) GA, on loan from Yokohama F.C. in January 2013 |
| 30 | GK | To Chun Kiu | (Hong Kong) | | 1 | -1 | 23 | 1 | -1 | | | | | (−) GA |
| 2 | DF | Lew Wai Yip | (Hong Kong) | | | | | | | | | | | |
| 3 | DF | Jason Scott Jeyam | (Hong Kong) | | | | | | | | | | | |
| 5 | DF | Leung Kwun Chung | (Hong Kong) | 18 | 19 | 1 | 1611 | 17 | 1 | 1 | | 1 | | |
| 15 | DF | Fung Hing Wa | (Hong Kong) | | | | | | | | | | | |
| 16 | DF | Lam Ngai Tong | (Hong Kong) | 19 | 20 | | 1736 | 16 | | 2 | | 2 | | |
| 31 | DF | Law Chun Bong | (Hong Kong) | 18 | 19 | | 1482 | 16 | | 1 | | 2 | | |
| 32 | DF | Leung Kwok Wai | (Hong Kong) | 17 | 18 | | 1537 | 14 | | 2 | | 2 | | |
| 33 | DF | Čedomir Mijanović | (Montenegro) | 21 | 21 | 2 | 1846 | 17 | 2 | 2 | | 2 | | |
| 4 | MF | Ryan Cuenca | (Hong Kong) | | | | | | | | | | | |
| 7 | MF | Lee Ka Ho | (Hong Kong) | 5 | 12 | 1 | 459 | 10 | 1 | 1 | | 1 | | |
| 8 | MF | Lee Ka Yiu | (Hong Kong) | 14 | 17 | 5 | 1138 | 15 | 5 | 1 | | 1 | | |
| 10 | MF | Lau Cheuk Hin | (Hong Kong) | 15 | 16 | 2 | 1294 | 12 | 2 | 2 | | 2 | | |
| 18 | MF | Tsuyoshi Yoshitake | (Japan) | 20 | 20 | 9 | 1721 | 16 | 9 | 2 | | 2 | | |
| 22 | MF | Chan Siu Kwan | (Hong Kong) | 12 | 14 | | 1180 | 13 | | | | 1 | | |
| 23 | MF | Wong Wai | (Hong Kong) | 18 | 19 | 1 | 1575 | 17 | 1 | 1 | | 1 | | |
| 24 | MF | Li Jian | (China) | 2 | 5 | | 299 | 3 | | 2 | | | | joined in September 2012 |
| 25 | MF | Mirko Teodorović | (Serbia) | 20 | 20 | | 1708 | 17 | | 2 | | 1 | | |
| 9 | FW | Lo Kong Wai | (Hong Kong) | 3 | 9 | | 306 | 6 | | 1 | | 2 | | |
| 14 | FW | Fong Pak Lun | (Hong Kong) | 5 | 15 | 1 | 856 | 11 | 1 | 2 | | 2 | | |
| 17 | FW | Hui Wang Fung | (Hong Kong) | 1 | 3 | | 39 | 2 | | 1 | | | | |
| 19 | FW | Michael Anthony Wu | (Hong Kong) | | | | | | | | | | | |
| 20 | FW | Kenji Fukuda | (Japan) | 9 | 10 | 3 | 824 | 8 | 3 | | | 2 | | joined in January 2013 |
| | FW | Aleksandar Brajovic | (Serbia) | 1 | 1 | | 43 | 1 | | | | | | left in September 2012 |

Last updated: 4 May 2013
Ordered by Position
0 shown as blank

=== Top scorers ===
As of 4 May 2013

| Place | Position | Nationality | Number | Name | First Division League | Senior Challenge Shield | FA Cup | Total |
|---|---|---|---|---|---|---|---|---|
| 1 | MF | (Japan) | 18 | Tsuyoshi Yoshitake | 9 | 0 | 0 | 9 |
| 2 | MF | (Hong Kong) | 8 | Lee Ka Yiu | 5 | 0 | 0 | 5 |
| 3 | FW | (Japan) | 20 | Kenji Fukuda | 3 | 0 | 0 | 3 |
| =4 | MF | (Hong Kong) | 10 | Lau Cheuk Hin | 2 | 0 | 0 | 2 |
| =4 | DF | (Montenegro) | 33 | Čedomir Mijanović | 2 | 0 | 0 | 2 |
| =6 | DF | (Hong Kong) | 5 | Leung Kwun Chung | 1 | 0 | 0 | 1 |
| =6 | MF | (Hong Kong) | 7 | Lee Ka Ho | 1 | 0 | 0 | 1 |
| =6 | FW | (Hong Kong) | 14 | Fong Pak Lun | 1 | 0 | 0 | 1 |
| =6 | MF | (Hong Kong) | 23 | Wong Wai | 1 | 0 | 0 | 1 |
| Own goal | | | | | 0 | 0 | 1 | 1 |
| TOTALS | | | | | 25 | 0 | 1 | 26 |

=== Disciplinary record ===
As of 4 May 2013

| Number | Nationality | Position | Name | First Division League | | Senior Challenge Shield | | FA Cup | | Total | |
| Number | Nationality | Position | Name | Booked | Sent off (straight red) | Booked | Sent off (straight red) | Booked | Sent off (straight red) | Booked | Sent off (straight red) |
| 1 | (Hong Kong) | GK | Tsang Man Fai | 1 | 0 | 0 | 0 | 0 | 0 | 1 | 0 |
| 5 | (Hong Kong) | DF | Leung Kwun Chung | 6 | 0 | 0 | 0 | 1 | 0 | 7 | 0 |
| 7 | (Hong Kong) | MF | Lee Ka Ho | 0 | 2 | 0 | 0 | 0 | 0 | 0 | 2 |
| 10 | (Hong Kong) | MF | Lau Cheuk Hin | 1 | 1 | 0 | 0 | 1 | 0 | 2 | 1 |
| 14 | (Hong Kong) | FW | Fong Pak Lun | 4 | 0 | 1 | 0 | 1 | 0 | 6 | 0 |
| 16 | (Hong Kong) | DF | Lam Ngai Tong | 3 | 0 | 0 | 0 | 1 | 0 | 4 | 0 |
| 18 | (Japan) | MF | Tsuyoshi Yoshitake | 1 | 1 | 1 | 0 | 0 | 0 | 2 | 1 |
| 20 | (Japan) | FW | Kenji Fukuda | 1 | 0 | 0 | 0 | 0 | 0 | 1 | 0 |
| 22 | (Hong Kong) | MF | Chan Siu Kwan | 4 | 0 | 0 | 0 | 0 | 0 | 4 | 0 |
| 23 | (Hong Kong) | MF | Wong Wai | 2 | 0 | 0 | 0 | 0 | 0 | 2 | 0 |
| 24 | (China) | MF | Li Jian | 1 | 0 | 1 | 0 | 0 | 0 | 2 | 0 |
| 25 | (Serbia) | MF | Mirko Teodorović | 3 | 0 | 0 | 0 | 1 | 0 | 4 | 0 |
| 31 | (Hong Kong) | DF | Law Chun Bong | 3 | 1 | 0 | 0 | 0 | 0 | 3 | 1 |
| 32 | (Hong Kong) | DF | Leung Kwok Wai | 4 | 0 | 0 | 0 | 0 | 0 | 4 | 0 |
| 33 | (Montenegro) | DF | Čedomir Mijanović | 4 | 0 | 0 | 0 | 0 | 0 | 4 | 0 |
| TOTALS | | | | 38 | 5 | 3 | 0 | 5 | 0 | 46 | 5 |

== Competitions ==
=== Overall ===
| Competition | Started round | Final position / round | First match | Last match |
|---|---|---|---|---|
| Hong Kong First Division League | — | 9th | 2 September 2012 | 4 May 2013 |
| Senior Challenge Shield | 1st round | 1st round | 23 September 2012 | 11 October 2012 |
| FA Cup | Quarter-finals | Quarter-finals | 17 February 2013 | 10 March 2013 |

Updated to match played 4 May 2013
Source: Competitions

=== First Division League ===
==== Classification ====
| Pos | Team | Pld | W | D | L | GF | GA | GD | Pts | Qualification or relegation |
|---|---|---|---|---|---|---|---|---|---|---|
| 6 | Hong Kong Rangers | 18 | 5 | 5 | 8 | 32 | 52 | −20 | 20 (Note: HKR 3–3 CIT, HKR 2–2 SUN, HKR 1–1 YHK; CIT 2–3 HKR, CIT 1–2 SUN, CIT 3–0 YHK; SUN 2–2 HKR, SUN 1–1 CIT, SUN 1–1 YHK; YHK 2–4 HKR, YHK 1–1 CIT, YHK 2–0 SUN) | |
| 7 | Sunray Cave JC Sun Hei | 18 | 4 | 8 | 6 | 26 | 33 | −7 | 20 | |
| 8 | Citizen | 18 | 5 | 5 | 8 | 31 | 27 | +4 | 20 | |
| 9 | Yokohama FC Hong Kong | 18 | 4 | 8 | 6 | 25 | 34 | −9 | 20 | |
| 10 | Wofoo Tai Po (Note: Wofoo Tai Po won the 2012–13 Hong Kong Senior Challenge Shield and thus qualified for the 2012–13 Hong Kong Season play-off along with Southern District whom qualified due to Kitchee winning the FA Cup along with coming runners up in the league.) (R) | 18 | 4 | 7 | 7 | 34 | 44 | −10 | 19 | 2012–13 Hong Kong Season play-off and relegation to the 2013–14 Hong Kong Second Division League |

Updated to match(es) played on 26 May 2013. Source:
Rules for classification: 1) points; 2) head-to-head points; 3) head-to-head goal difference; 4) head-to-head goals scored; 5) goal difference; 6) number of goals scored.
(R) Relegated

==== Results summary ====
| Overall | | | | | | | | Home | | | | | | Away | | | | | |
| Pld | W | D | L | GF | GA | GD | Pts | W | D | L | GF | GA | GD | W | D | L | GF | GA | GD |
|---|---|---|---|---|---|---|---|---|---|---|---|---|---|---|---|---|---|---|---|
| 18 | 4 | 8 | 6 | 25 | 34 | −9 | 20 | 2 | 4 | 3 | 12 | 16 | −4 | 2 | 4 | 3 | 13 | 18 | −5 |

Last updated: 4 May 2013.

==== Results by round ====
| Round | 1 | 2 | 3 | 4 | 5 | 6 | 7 | 8 | 9 | 10 | 11 | 12 | 13 | 14 | 15 | 16 | 17 | 18 |
|---|---|---|---|---|---|---|---|---|---|---|---|---|---|---|---|---|---|---|
| Ground | A | A | H | A | H | A | H | A | H | A | A | H | A | A | H | H | H | H |
| Result | L | W | W | D | L | L | L | W | D | D | L | D | D | D | W | L | D | D |
| Position | 9 | 5 | 3 | 3 | 5 | 6 | 7 | 6 | 6 | 6 | 7 | 6 | 7 | 6 | 6 | 6 | 6 | 9 |

Updated to match(es) played on 4 May 2013. Source:
A = Away; H = Home; W = Win; D = Draw; L = Loss

== Matches ==
=== Pre-season ===
| 26 July 2012 | Yokohama FC Hong Kong | 2 – 1 | (Hong Kong) Southern |

=== Competitive ===
==== First Division League ====
| 2 September 2012 Week 1 | South China | 5 – 2 | Yokohama FC Hong Kong | So Kon Po, Hong Kong Island |
| 14:30 (GMT+8) | Dhiego 7'; Itaparica 17' (pen.), 62'; Ticão 32'; Lee Hong Lim 80'; Tse (yellow card) 85' | Report | 4' Yoshitake; (yellow card) 16' Leung Kwun Chung; (yellow card) 61' Law Chun Bong; 90' Lee Ka Ho | Stadium: Hong Kong Stadium (Capatity:40,000); Attendance: 3,175; Referee: Tong Kui Sum; Assistant referees: Cheng Oi Cho, Lam Nai Kei; Fourth official: Amarjit Singh Sarao |

| 9 September 2012 Week 2 | Wofoo Tai Po | 2 – 3 | Yokohama FC Hong Kong | Tai Po, New Territories |
| 14:30 (GMT+8) | Li Shu Yeung (yellow card) 8' (yellow-red card) 57'; Alex 34' (yellow card) 35'; Che Run Qiu (yellow card) 54'; Aender 60' (pen.) | Report | 13' (yellow card) 44' Leung Kwun Chung; 33' (pen.) Yoshitake; (yellow card) 62' Tsang Man Fai; 81' Lee Ka Yiu; (yellow card) 82' Wong Wai | Stadium: Tai Po Sports Ground (Capatity:3,000); Attendance: 814; Referee: Ng Chiu Kok; Assistant referees: Chow Chun Kit, Lam Shing Yan, Franky; Fourth official: Yau Ho Fai, Leo |

| 16 September 2012 Week 3 | Yokohama FC Hong Kong | 2 – 0 | Sunray Cave JC Sun Hei | Siu Sai Wan, Hong Kong Island |
| 17:30 (GMT+8) | Lam Ngai Tong (yellow card) 38'; Lau Cheuk Hin 67', 84'; Mirko (yellow card) 79' | Report | (yellow card) 45' Li Hang Wui; (yellow card) 78' Leung Tsz Chun | Stadium: Siu Sai Wan Sports Ground (Capatity:12,000); Attendance: 795; Referee: Wong Chi Tang, Charlton; Assistant referees: Cheng Oi Cho, Poon Ming Fai; Fourth official: Lam Chi Ho |

| 30 September 2012 Week 4 | Tuen Mun | 2 – 2 | Yokohama FC Hong Kong | Tuen Mun, New Territories |
| 14:30 (GMT+8) | Lai Yiu Cheong 64'; Mauricio 70'; Li Haiqiang (yellow card) 71'; Daniel (yellow card) 90' | Report | (yellow card) 12' Mijanović; 32' Lee Ka Yiu; (yellow card) 37' Lam Ngai Tong; (yellow card) 59' Law Chun Bong; (yellow card) 63' Mirko; 86' (pen.) Yoshitake | Stadium: Tuen Mun Tang Siu Kin Sports Ground (Capatity:2,200); Attendance: 969; Referee: Ng Kai Lam; Assistant referees: Poon Ming Fai, Yu Chun San; Fourth official: Tong Kui Sum |

| 7 October 2012 Week 5 | Yokohama FC Hong Kong | 1 – 4 | Kitchee | Mong Kok, Kowloon |
| 17:30 (GMT+8) | Law Chun Bong (red card) 14'; Lee Ka Ho (yellow card) 49' (yellow-red card) 58'; Yoshitake (yellow card) 58' (goal) 90' | Report | 25', 35' Chu Siu Kei; 51' (77) Yago; (yellow card) 58' Cheng Siu Wai | Stadium: Mong Kok Stadium^{1} (Capatity:6,680); Attendance: 1,895; Referee: Ng Chiu Kok; Assistant referees: Cheng Oi Cho, Lam Chi Ho; Fourth official: Lau Fong Hei |

| 23 October 2012 Week 6 | Citizen | 3 – 0 | Yokohama FC Hong Kong | Mong Kok, Kowloon |
| 14:30 (GMT+8) | Festus (yellow card) 33' (goal) 65'; Detinho 52'; Tam Lok Hin (yellow card) 74' (goal) 90' | Report | (yellow card) 12' Leung Kwok Wai | Stadium: Mong Kok Stadium (Capatity:6,680); Attendance: 1,231; Referee: Cheng Oi Cho; Assistant referees: Chan Shui Hung, Lam Nai Kei; Fourth official: Lam Chi Ho |

| 26 October 2012 Week 7 | Yokohama FC Hong Kong | 2 – 4 | Biu Chun Rangers | Siu Sai Wan, Hong Kong Island |
| 20:00 (GMT+8) | Yoshitake 40'; Wong Wai 64' | Report | 15' Akosah; 36', 63' Lam Hok Hei; 41' Giovane; (yellow card) 43' Chan Siu Yuen; (yellow card) 90+2' Chak Ting Fung | Stadium: Siu Sai Wan Sports Ground (Capatity:12,000); Attendance: 264; Referee: Tong Kui Sum; Assistant referees: Lam Chi Ho, Chung Ming Sang; Fourth official: Luk Kin Sun |

| 10 November 2012 Week 8 | Sun Pegasus | 1 – 2 | Yokohama FC Hong Kong | Yuen Long, New Territories |
| 17:30 (GMT+8) | Thiago 11'; Ju Yingzhi (yellow card) 50'; Deng Jinghuang (yellow card) 81'; Mbome (yellow card) 86' | Report | 44', 74' Yoshitake; (yellow card) 47' Fong Pak Lun; (yellow card) 81' (yellow-red card) 90+3' Lau Cheuk Hin | Stadium: Yuen Long Stadium (Capatity:4,932); Attendance: 424; Referee: Ho Wai Sing; Assistant referees: Tong Kui Sum, Chung Ming Sang; Fourth official: Yu Chun San |

| 22 December 2012 Week 9 | Yokohama FC Hong Kong | 0 – 0 | Southern | Siu Sai Wan, Hong Kong Island |
| 14:30 (GMT+8) | Mijanović (yellow card) 69' | Report | (yellow card) 29' Tsang Chiu Tat; (yellow card) 88' Dieguito | Stadium: Siu Sai Wan Sports Ground (Capatity:12,000); Attendance: 549; Referee: Cheng Oi Cho; Assistant referees: Lam Chi Ho, Liu Kwok Man; Fourth official: Yau Tsz Yeung |

| 20 January 2013 Week 10 | Kitchee | 2 – 2 | Yokohama FC Hong Kong | Tseung Kwan O, New Territories |
| 17:30 (GMT+8) | Jordi 2'; Recio (yellow card) 9'; Yago 82' | Report | 22' (yellow card) 90+3' (yellow-red card) 90+6' Yoshitake; (yellow card) 40' Mirko; 54' Mijanović; (yellow card) 64' Chan Siu Kwan | Stadium: Tseung Kwan O Sports Ground (Capatity:3,500); Attendance: 759; Referee: Ng Chiu Kok; Assistant referees: Chung Ming Sang, Lam Shing Yan Franky; Fourth official: Chow Chun Kit |

| 2 February 2013 Week 11 | Southern | 1 – 0 | Yokohama FC Hong Kong | Aberdeen, Hong Kong Island |
| 14:30 (GMT+8) | Carril 6' (yellow card) 90+4'; Fofo (yellow card) 70'; Chan Cheuk Kwong (yellow card) 78'; Chiu Yu Ming (yellow card) 84'; Cheng Chi Wing (yellow card) 87' | Report | (yellow card) 28' Law Chun Bong; (yellow card) 66' Chan Siu Kwan; (yellow card) 88' Leung Kwok Wai; (yellow card) 90+3' Leung Kwun Chung; (yellow card) 90+5' Mijanović | Stadium: Aberdeen Sports Ground (Capatity:9,000); Attendance: 487; Referee: Ho Wai Sing; Assistant referees: Chan Shui Hung, Lam Nai Kei; Fourth official: Yu Chun San |

| 24 February 2013 Week 12 | Yokohama FC Hong Kong | 1 – 1 | Sun Pegasus | Siu Sai Wan, Hong Kong Island |
| 17:30 (GMT+8) | Mijanović 4'; Lau Cheuk Hin (yellow card) 36'; Leung Kwun Chung (yellow card) 90+4' | Report | (yellow card) 5' So Wai Chuen; (yellow card) 38' Mbome; (yellow card) 42' Bai He; (yellow card) 68' Miović; 77' Deng Jinghuang; (yellow card) 84' Tong Kin Man | Stadium: Siu Sai Wan Sports Ground (Capatity:12,000); Attendance: 503; Referee: Ng Chiu Kok; Assistant referees: Lui Siu Chuen, Fok Pong Shing; Fourth official: Cheng Oi Cho |

| 17 March 2013 Week 14 | Biu Chun Rangers | 1 – 1 | Yokohama FC Hong Kong | Sham Shui Po, Kowloon |
| 14:30 (GMT+8) | Lam Hok Hei 24'; Luciano 63'; Bamnjo (yellow card) 77' (yellow-red card) 90+8'; Akosah (yellow card) 86'; Miroslav (yellow card) 90+3' | Report | (yellow card) 43' Lam Ngai Tong; (yellow card) 60' Leung Kwok Wai; (yellow card) 82' Fong Pak Lun; (yellow card) 88' Chan Siu Kwan; 90+5' Lee Ka Yiu | Stadium: Sham Shui Po Sports Ground (Capatity:2,194); Attendance: 399; Referee: Ho Wai Sing; Assistant referees: Chung Ming Sang, Poon Ming Fai; Fourth official: Chow Chun Kit |

| 24 March 2013 Week 13^{2} | Sunray Cave JC Sun Hei | 1 – 1 | Yokohama FC Hong Kong | Mong Kok, Kowloon |
| 14:30 (GMT+8) | Su Yang (yellow card) 20'; Roberto 62'; Liang Zicheng (yellow card) 76'; Zhang Chunhui (yellow card) 90' | Report | (yellow card) 4' Fong Pak Lun; 19' Lee Ka Yiu; (yellow card) 73' (yellow-red card) 81' Lee Ka Ho; (yellow card) 90' Leung Kwun Chung | Stadium: Mong Kok Stadium (Capatity:6,680); Attendance: 627; Referee: Cheng Oi Cho; Assistant referees: Lui Siu Chuen, Sarao Amarjit Singh; Fourth official: Lam Chi Ho |

| 30 March 2013 Week 15 | Yokohama FC Hong Kong | 0 – 0 (Abandoned^{3}) | South China | Mong Kok, Kowloon |
| 17:30 (GMT+8) | Lo Kong Wai (yellow card) 7'; Chan Siu Kwan (yellow card) 21'; Law Chun Bong (yellow card) 22' | Report | | Stadium: Mong Kok Stadium^{1} (Capatity:6,680); Referee: Ng Chiu Kok; Assistant referees: Liu Kwok Man, Lam Chi Ho; Fourth official: Chow Chun Kit |

| 4 April 2013 Week 15R^{4} | Yokohama FC Hong Kong | 1 – 0 | South China | Siu Sai Wan, Hong Kong Island |
| 14:30 (GMT+8) | Yoshitake 13'; Chan Siu Kwan (yellow card) 42'; Mijanović (yellow card) 42'; Leung Kwun Chung (yellow card) 55'; Fukuda (yellow card) 83' | Report | (yellow card) 26' Ticão; (yellow card) 88' Luk Chi Ho; (yellow card) 90+1' Celin | Stadium: Siu Sai Wan Sports Ground (Capatity:12,000); Attendance: 946; Referee: Ho Wai Sing; Assistant referees: Chan Shui Hung, Poon Ming Fai; Fourth official: Lui Siu Chuen |

| 13 April 2013 Week 16 | Yokohama FC Hong Kong | 2 – 4 | Tuen Mun | Siu Sai Wan, Hong Kong Island |
| 17:30 (GMT+8) | Fukuda 52' (pen.); Fong Pak Lun (yellow card) 62' (goal) 81'; Leung Kwok Wai (yellow card) 73' | Report | 2' Mauricio; 35' Ling Cong; 43' Chao Pengfei; (yellow card) 51' Diego; 74' (pen.) Beto | Stadium: Siu Sai Wan Sports Ground (Capatity:12,000); Attendance: 432; Referee: Cheng Oi Cho; Assistant referees: Chan Shui Hung, Tang Hing Fu; Fourth official: Lau Fong Hei |

| 18 April 2013 Week 17 | Yokohama FC Hong Kong | 1 – 1 | Citizen | Siu Sai Wan, Hong Kong Island |
| 20:00 (GMT+8) | Fukuda 33'; Mirko (yellow card) 72'; Mijanović (yellow card) 80' | Report | 80' Sham Kwok Keung | Stadium: Siu Sai Wan Sports Ground (Capatity:12,000); Attendance: 227; Referee: Liu Kwok Man; Assistant referees: Lam Chi Ho, Poon Ming Fai; Fourth official: Tang Hing Fu |

| 4 May 2013 Week 18 | Yokohama FC Hong Kong | 2 – 2 | Wofoo Tai Po | Siu Sai Wan, Hong Kong Island |
| 15:30 (GMT+8) | Lee Ka Yiu 23'; Wong Wai (yellow card) 37'; Fukuda 90+5' | Report | 8' (red card) 19' Alex; (yellow card) 27' Li Shu Yeung; (yellow card) 33' Clayton; 90' Aender; (yellow card) 90+3' Che Run Qiu | Stadium: Siu Sai Wan Sports Ground (Capatity:12,000); Attendance: 1,064; Referee: Liu Kwok Man; Assistant referees: Chow Chun Kit, Lam Chi Ho; Fourth official: Luk Kin Sun |

Remarks:
^{1} Home matches against Kitchee and South China are played at Mong Kok Stadium instead of their usual home ground Siu Sai Wan Sports Ground.
^{2} Away match against Sunray Cave JC Sun Hei was originally played on 2 March 2013 but was postponed and rescheduled on 23 March 2013.
^{3} The match was abandoned after 28 minutes due to adverse weather and bad pitch conditions.
^{4} The replay of week 15 match against Yokohama FC Hong Kong was scheduled to be played at Siu Sai Wan Sports Ground on 4 April 2013.

==== Senior Challenge Shield ====
===== First round =====
| 23 September 2012 1st leg | Wofoo Tai Po | 2 – 0 | Yokohama FC Hong Kong | Tai Po, New Territories |
| 14:00 (GMT+8) | Lui Chi Hing (yellow card) 9'; Alex 15' (yellow card) 65'; Clayton 42' | Report | (yellow card) 52' Li Jian | Stadium: Tai Po Sports Ground (Capacity: 3,000); Attendance: 706; Referee: Tong Kui Sum; Assistant referees: Ho Wai Sing, Poon Ming Fai; Fourth official: Chow Chun Kit |

| 11 October 2012 2nd leg | Yokohama FC Hong Kong | 0 – 0 (0 – 2 agg.) | Wofoo Tai Po | Siu Sai Wan, Hong Kong Island |
| 20:00 (GMT+8) | Fong Pak Lun (yellow card) 90'; Yoshitake (yellow card) 90' | Report | (yellow card) 90' Wong Yim Kwan | Stadium: Siu Sai Wan Sports Ground (Capacity: 12,000); Attendance: 592; Referee: Tong Kui Sum; Assistant referees: Lam Nai Kei, Poon Ming Fai; Fourth official: Ng Chiu Kok |

==== FA Cup ====
===== Quarter-finals =====
| 17 February 2013 1st leg | Wofoo Tai Po | 0 – 0 | Yokohama FC Hong Kong | Tai Po, New Territories |
| 14:30(GMT+8) | Ye Jia (yellow card) 58' | Report | (yellow card) 58' Lau Cheuk Hin; (yellow card) 82' Mirko; (yellow card) 90' Leung Kwun Chung | Stadium: Tai Po Sports Ground (Capacity: 3,000); Attendance: 497; Referee: Liu Kwok Man; Assistant referees: Chow Chun Kit, Yau Ho Fai Leo; Fourth official: Lam Shing Yan |

| 10 March 2013 2nd leg | Yokohama FC Hong Kong | 1 – 3 (1 – 3 agg.) | Wofoo Tai Po | Siu Sai Wan, Hong Kong Island |
| 14:30(GMT+8) | Lam Ngai Tong (yellow card) 84'; Fong Pak Lun (yellow card) 90+2'; Clayton 90+3' (o.g.) | Report | (yellow card) 42' Lui Chi Hing; 50' Alex; 74', 88' Annan | Stadium: Siu Sai Wan Sports Ground (Capacity: 12,000); Attendance: 447; Referee: Ho Wai Sing; Assistant referees: Chan Shui Hung, Poon Ming Fai; Fourth official: Chow Chun Kit |
