= Lee Ka Yiu =

Hong Kong footballer (born 1992)

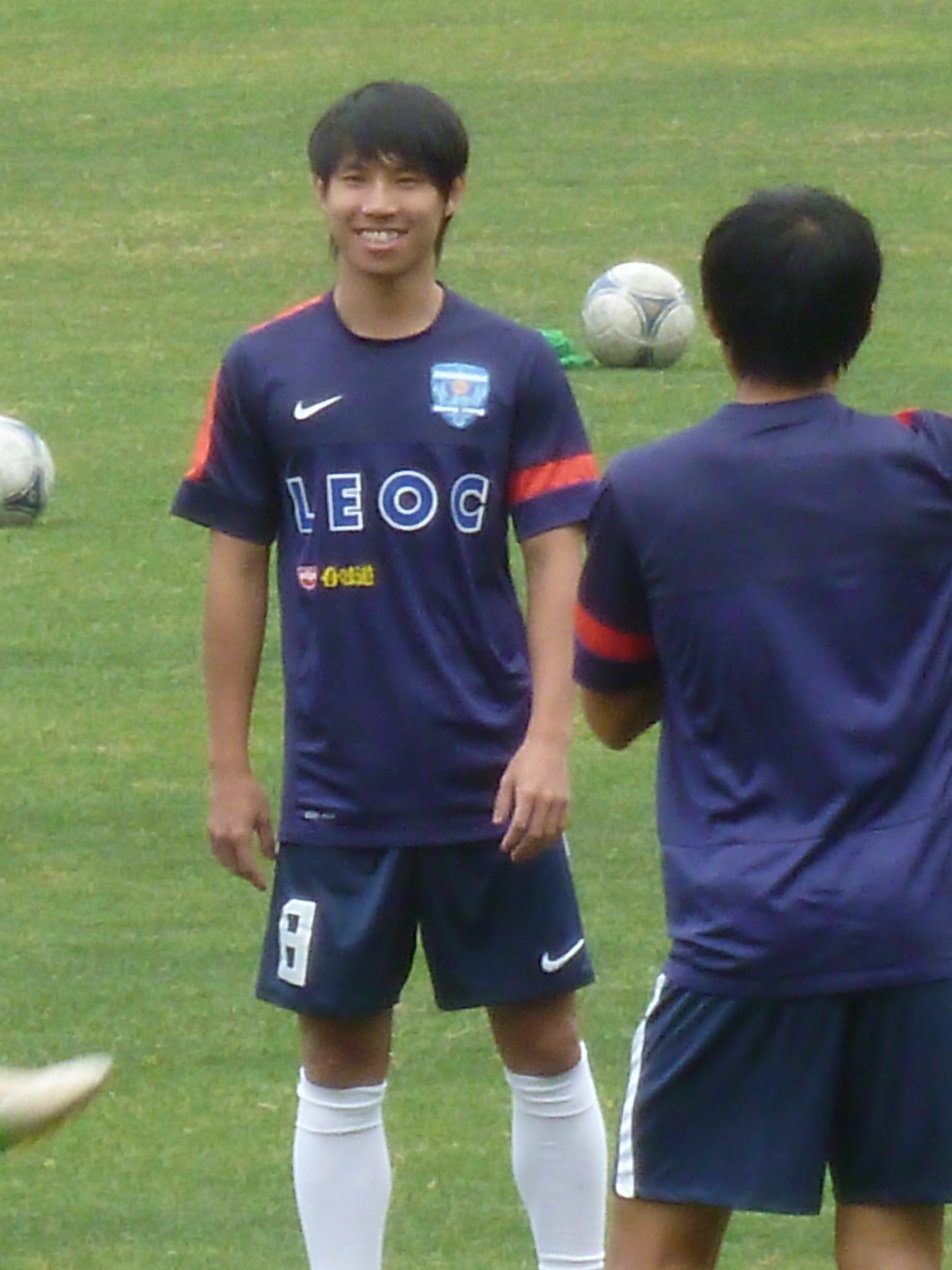

Personal information
- Full name: Lee Ka Yiu
- Date of birth: 10 April 1992 (age 34)
- Place of birth: Hong Kong
- Height: 1.73 m (5 ft 8 in)
- Positions: Right back; winger

Team information
- Current team: Southern
- Number: 8

Youth career
- Sham Shui Po

Senior career*
Years	Team	Apps	(Gls)
2008–2012	Sham Shui Po	45	(6)
2012–2015	YFCMD	44	(6)
2015–2016	Pegasus	15	(2)
2016–2019	Tai Po	43	(5)
2019–2022	Eastern	24	(0)
2022–	Southern	76	(2)

International career^{‡}
- Hong Kong U-23
2012–2018	Hong Kong	8	(0)
- * Club domestic league appearances and goals as of 21 November 2026 ‡ National team caps and goals as of 13 November 2018

Lee Ka Yiu (Chinese: 李嘉耀; Jyutping: lei^{5} gaa^{1} jiu^{6}; born 10 April 1992) is a Hong Kong professional footballer who currently plays for Hong Kong Premier League club Southern.

== Club career ==
=== Sham Shui Po ===
Lee Ka Yiu joined Sham Shui Po youth team when he was young. In 2008, Third 'District' League team Sham Shui Po youth team members were all promoted to the first team to gain experience. In the first season, the club reached the final of Junior Shield, which eventually lost 0–2 to Shatin. The club then gained promotion to Second Division in their second season.

Lee helped the club to gain promote from Second Division by scoring 4 goals in 16 games in the 2010–11 season. In the 2011–12 season, he featured every game for Sham Shui Po, including 18 league games, 2 Senior Shield, 2 League Cup and 2 FA Cup matches. However, the team eventually regulated after finishing on the second last place of the league.

=== Yokohama FC Hong Kong ===
Lee joined Yokohama FC Hong Kong in July 2012, alongside former Sham Shui Po manager Lee Chi Kin and other Sham Shui Po players.

=== Tai Po ===
After the conclusion of his contract, Lee once again followed Lee Chi Kin, this time to newly promoted HKPL club Tai Po. He was revealed as a Tai Po player during the club's season kick off event on 19 July 2016.

=== Eastern ===
On 17 July 2019, Eastern announced Lee's signing at their season opening media event. He left the club on 9 July 2022.

=== Southern ===
Lee signed with Southern on 18 July 2022.

== International career ==
On 15 August 2012, Lee made his international debut for Hong Kong in a friendly match against Singapore.

== Career statistic ==
=== Club ===
As of 4 May 2013

Club	Season	Division	League		Senior Shield		League Cup		FA Cup		AFC Cup		Total	
Club	Season	Division	Apps	Goals	Apps	Goals	Apps	Goals	Apps	Goals	Apps	Goals	Apps	Goals
Sham Shui Po	2008–09	Third 'District' Division	9	2	1^{1}	0^{1}	N/A	N/A	N/A	N/A	N/A	N/A	10	2
Sham Shui Po	2009–10	Third 'District' Division	2	0	—^{2}		N/A	N/A	N/A	N/A	N/A	N/A	2	0
Sham Shui Po	2010–11	Second Division	16	4	1^{1}	0^{1}	N/A	N/A	N/A	N/A	N/A	N/A	17	4
Sham Shui Po	2011–12	First Division	18	0	2	0	2	0	2	0	N/A	N/A	24	0
Sham Shui Po Total			45	6	4	0	2	0	2	0	0	0	53	6
Yokohama FC Hong Kong	2012–13	First Division	15	5	1	0	—	—	1	0	N/A	N/A	17	5
Yokohama FC Hong Kong Total			15	5	1	0	0	0	1	0	0	0	17	5
Total			60	11	5	0	2	0	3	0	0	0	70	11

=== Notes ===
1. Since Sham Shui Po was competing in lower divisions, they could only join the Junior Shield instead of Senior Shield.
2. Hong Kong Junior Challenge Shield was not held in the 2009–10 season.

=== International ===
As of 13 November 2018

National team	Year	Apps	Goals
Hong Kong	2012	2	0
Hong Kong	2013	0	0
Hong Kong	2014	0	0
Hong Kong	2015	3	0
Hong Kong	2016	0	0
Hong Kong	2017	1	0
Hong Kong	2018	2	0
Total		8	0

As of 13 November 2018. Scores and results list Hong Kong's goal tally first.

#	Date	Venue	Opponent	Result	Scored	Competition
1	15 August 2012	Jurong West Stadium, Jurong West, Singapore	Singapore	0–2	0	Friendly
2	16 October 2012	Mong Kok Stadium, Mong Kok, Hong Kong	Malaysia	0–3	0	Friendly
3	28 March 2015	Mong Kok Stadium, Mong Kok, Hong Kong	Guam	1–0	0	Friendly
4	11 June 2015	Mong Kok Stadium, Mong Kok, Hong Kong	Bhutan	7–0	0	2018 FIFA World Cup qualification – AFC second round
5	13 October 2015	Changlimithang Stadium, Thimphu, Bhutan	Bhutan	1–0	0	2018 FIFA World Cup qualification – AFC second round
6	23 March 2017	King Abdullah II Stadium, Amman, Jordan	Jordan	0–4	0	Friendly
7	11 October 2018	Mong Kok Stadium, Mong Kok, Hong Kong	Thailand	0–0	0	Friendly
8	13 November 2018	Taipei Municipal Stadium, Taipei, Taiwan	North Korea	0–0	0	2019 EAFF E-1 Football Championship Round 2

== Honours ==
=== Club ===
Eastern

- Hong Kong Senior Shield: 2019–20
- Hong Kong FA Cup: 2019–20

Tai Po

- Hong Kong Premier League: 2018–19

Southern

- Hong Kong Sapling Cup: 2022–23, 2024–25
