= Wong Wai =

Hong Kong footballer

Wong Wai 黃威
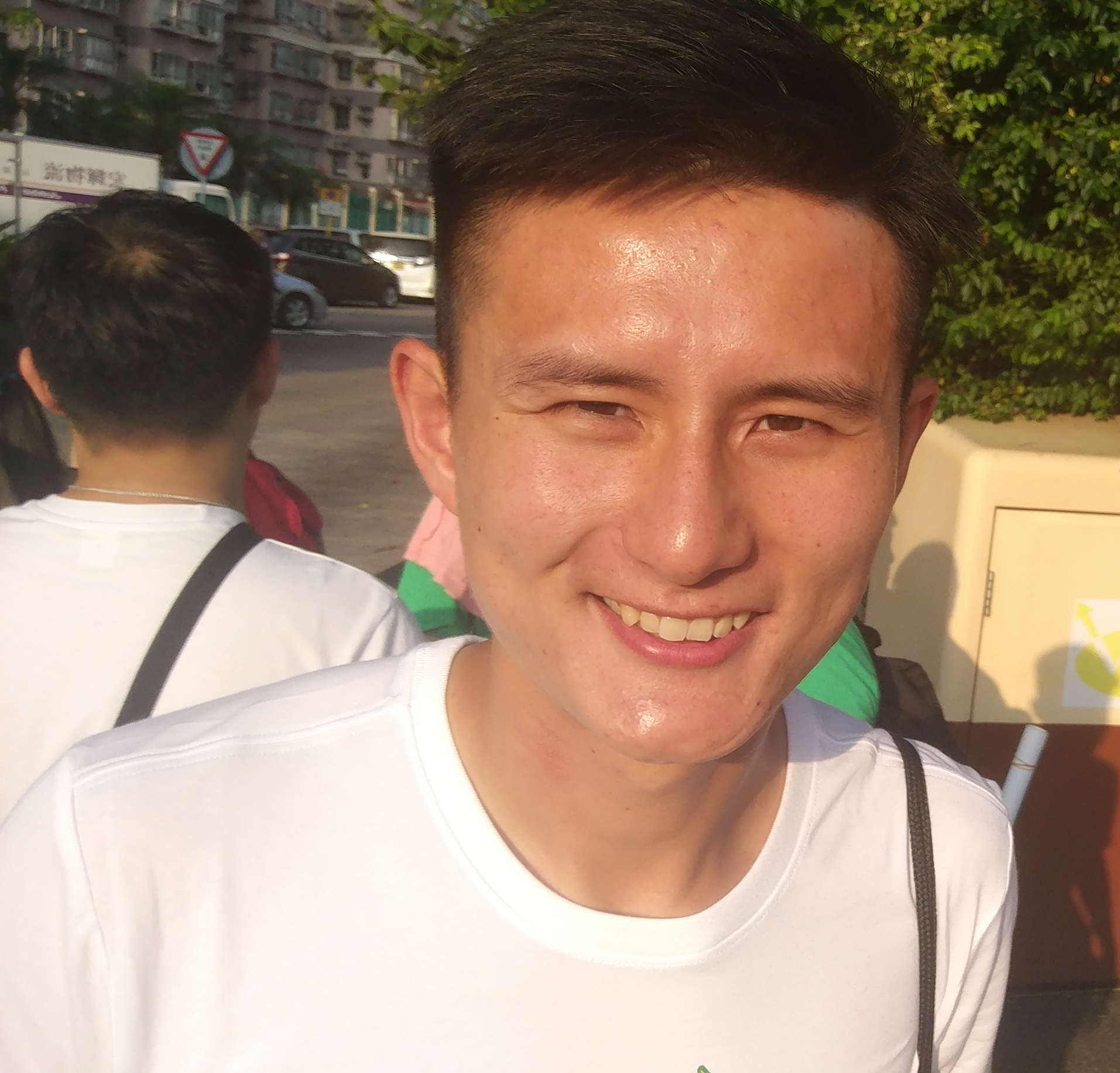
- Wong in 2019

Personal information
- Full name: Wong Wai
- Date of birth: 17 September 1992 (age 34)
- Place of birth: British Hong Kong
- Height: 1.84 m (6 ft 0 in)
- Position: Midfielder

Team information
- Current team: Nanjing City
- Number: 5

Youth career
- Sham Shui Po

Senior career*
Years	Team	Apps	(Gls)
2008–2012	Sham Shui Po	62	(32)
2012–2015	YFCMD	39	(2)
2015–2016	Pegasus	7	(0)
2016–2019	Tai Po	54	(10)
2019–2022	Eastern	19	(2)
2021–2022	→ HK U23 (loan)	4	(2)
2022–2026	Lee Man	59	(10)
2026–	Nanjing City	16	(1)

International career^{‡}
2009	Hong Kong U-19	5	(1)
2010–2014	Hong Kong U-23	4	(0)
2013–	Hong Kong	63	(7)
- * Club domestic league appearances and goals as of 7 November 2026 ‡ National team caps and goals as of 9 June 2026

Wong Wai (Chinese: 黃威; Jyutping: wong^{4} wai^{1}; born 17 September 1992) is a Hong Kong professional footballer who currently plays as a midfielder for China League One club Nanjing City and the Hong Kong national team.

== Club career ==
=== Early career ===
Wong studied at Yu Chun Keung Memorial College and graduated after Form 5. He represented various youth levels of the national team.

=== Sham Shui Po ===
Wong joined Third Division club Sham Shui Po when he was young. In 2008, youth team members were all promoted to the club's first team in order to gain experience. In the first season, the club reached the final of Junior Shield, which they eventually lost 0–2 to Shatin. Wong Wai played 5 out of 6 games and scored a goal in the semi-finals.

In Wong's second season, he scored 12 goals throughout the season, including 3 goals in the promotion play-offs, which helped the club gain promotion to the Second Division.

Wong helped the club gain promotion to the First Division for the first time in club history by scoring 12 goals in 19 games in the 2010–11 season. In the 2011–12 season, he failed to help the team prevent relegation to the Second Division, although he featured in most of the matches.

=== Metro Gallery ===
Wong linked up with former Sham Shui Po player and manager Lee Chi Kin and joined Yokohama FC Hong Kong in July 2012.

=== Tai Po ===
After the conclusion of his contract, Wong once again followed Lee Chi Kin, this time to the newly promoted HKPL club Tai Po. He was revealed as a Tai Po player during the club's season kick-off event on 19 July 2016.

On 17 July 2019, it was revealed that Wong had left Tai Po at the end of his contract.

=== Eastern ===
On 27 September 2019, once again following Lee Chi Kin, Wong signed for Eastern.

=== HK U23 ===
Before the beginning of the 2021–22 season, the newly formed HK U23 announced that Wong joined the club on loan for the season as one of the over-aged players.

=== Lee Man ===
On 8 July 2022, Wong signed for Lee Man.

=== Nanjing City ===
On 3 March 2026, Wong moved abroad and joined China League One club Nanjing City.

== International career ==
Wong had represented the Hong Kong national under-19 football team and participated in the 2010 AFC U-19 Championship qualification held in Indonesia. He scored one goal in four games.

On 16 February 2013, Wong received his first call-up from the senior team for the 2015 AFC Asian Cup qualification against Vietnam. However, he was excluded from the final squad announced on 15 March 2013.

On 31 May 2013, Wong was included in the 20-men final squad for an international friendly match against the Philippines held on 4 June. He made his debut during the match, as he entered in the 77th minute as a substitute for Leung Chun Pong.

On 5 October 2017, Wong scored his first international goal against Laos.

On 21 November 2023, Wong scored an equalizer against Turkmenistan in the second round of 2026 World Cup AFC qualifiers, which ended in a 2–2 draw.

On 26 December 2023, Wong was named in Hong Kong's squad for the 2023 AFC Asian Cup.

== Career statistics ==
=== Club ===
As of 19 May 2021

Club	Season	Division	League		Senior Shield		League Cup		FA Cup		AFC Cup		Other		Total	
Club	Season	Division	Apps	Goals	Apps	Goals	Apps	Goals	Apps	Goals	Apps	Goals	Apps	Goals	Apps	Goals
Sham Shui Po	2008–09	Third 'District' Division	13	9	5 (Note: Since Sham Shui Po was competing in lower divisions, they could only join the Junior Shield instead of Senior Shield)	1 (Note: Since Sham Shui Po was competing in lower divisions, they could only join the Junior Shield instead of Senior Shield)									18	10
Sham Shui Po	2009–10	Third 'District' Division	13	9	— (Note: Hong Kong Junior Challenge Shield was not held in the 2009–10 season.)								3 (Note: Hong Kong Third Division Champion Play-off.)	3 (Note: Hong Kong Third Division Champion Play-off.)	16	12
Sham Shui Po	2010–11	Second Division	19	12	3 (Note: Since Sham Shui Po was competing in lower divisions, they could only join the Junior Shield instead of Senior Shield)	5 (Note: Since Sham Shui Po was competing in lower divisions, they could only join the Junior Shield instead of Senior Shield)									22	17
Sham Shui Po	2011–12	First Division	17	2	2	0	2	0	2	0					23	2
Sham Shui Po Total			62	32	10	6	2	0	2	0	0	0	3	3	79	41
Metro Gallery	2012–13	First Division	17	1	1	0	—		1	0	—				19	1
Metro Gallery	2013–14	First Division	12	1	1	0	—		1	0	—				14	1
Metro Gallery	2014–15	First Division	5	0	1	0	2	0	—		—				8	0
Pegasus	2015–16	First Division	4	0	—		2	0	3	1	—				9	1
Wofoo Taipo	2016–17	First Division	20	4	3	2	—		0	0	—				23	6
Wofoo Taipo	2017–18	First Division	17	4	1	0	—		3	2	—				21	6
Wofoo Taipo	2018–19	First Division	16	2	4	1	—		0	0	8	0			28	3
Eastern	2019–20	First Division	3	2	2	0	—		3	2	—				8	4
Eastern	2020–21	First Division	6	0	—		—		—		—				6	0
Total			162	46	23	9	6	0	13	5	8	0	3	3	215	63

=== International ===
As of 9 June 2026

National team	Year	Apps	Goals
Hong Kong	2013	1	0
Hong Kong	2014	5	0
Hong Kong	2015	0	0
Hong Kong	2016	2	0
Hong Kong	2017	7	1
Hong Kong	2018	6	0
Hong Kong	2019	5	0
Hong Kong	2020	0	0
Hong Kong	2021	2	0
Hong Kong	2022	7	1
Hong Kong	2023	8	2
Hong Kong	2024	10	2
Hong Kong	2025	7	1
Hong Kong	2026	3	0
Total		63	7

No.	Date	Cap	Venue	Opponent	Score	Result	Competition
1.	5 October 2017	12	Mong Kok Stadium, Mong Kok, Hong Kong	Laos	2–0	4–0	Friendly
2.	8 June 2022	30	Salt Lake Stadium, Kolkata, India	Afghanistan	1–0	2–1	2023 AFC Asian Cup qualification – third round
3.	11 September 2023	40	Hong Kong Stadium, So Kon Po, Hong Kong	Brunei	5–0	10–0	Friendly
4.	21 November 2023	43	Hong Kong Stadium, So Kon Po, Hong Kong	Turkmenistan	1–1	2–2	2026 FIFA World Cup qualification – AFC second round
5.	5 September 2024	47	HFC Bank Stadium, Suva, Fiji	Solomon Islands	3–0	3–0	Friendly
6.	8 December 2024	51	Mong Kok Stadium, Mong Kok, Hong Kong	Mongolia	2–0	3–0	2025 EAFF E-1 Football Championship – preliminary round
7.	13 November 2025	60	Hong Kong Stadium, So Kon Po, Hong Kong	Cambodia	1–0	1–1	Friendly

== Honours ==
Eastern

- Hong Kong Senior Shield: 2019–20
- Hong Kong FA Cup: 2019–20
- Hong Kong Sapling Cup: 2020–21

Pegasus

- Hong Kong FA Cup: 2015–16
- Hong Kong Sapling Cup: 2015–16

Tai Po

- Hong Kong Premier League: 2018–19
- Hong Kong Sapling Cup: 2016–17

Lee Man

- Hong Kong Premier League: 2023–24
