= Lam Ngai Tong =

Macanese association football player

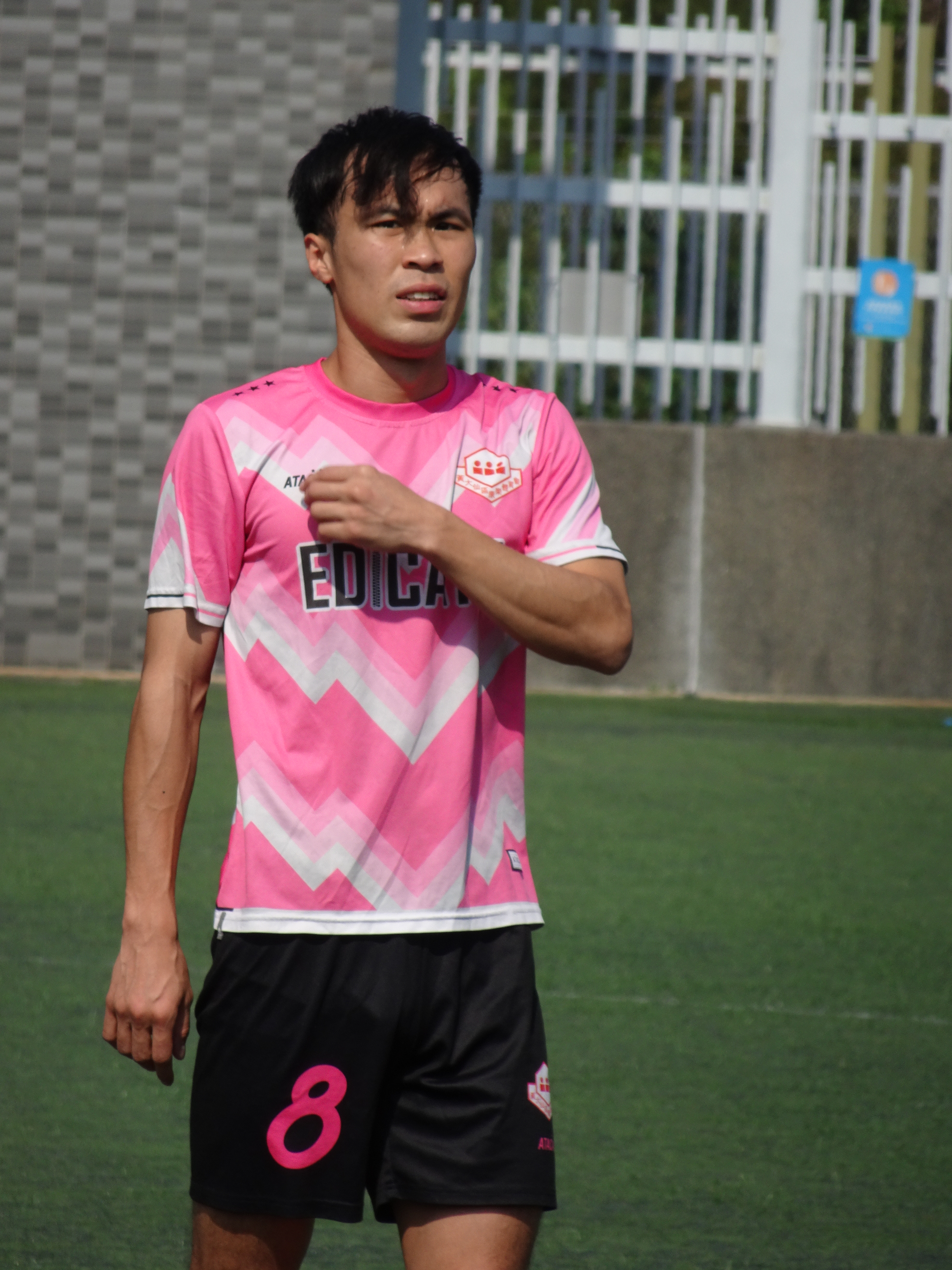

Personal information
- Full name: Lam Ngai Tong
- Date of birth: 13 January 1990 (age 36)
- Place of birth: Santo António, Macau
- Height: 1.60 m (5 ft 3 in)
- Position: Defender

Youth career
- The Yuen Yuen Institute

Senior career*
Years	Team	Apps	(Gls)
2011–2012	Sham Shui Po	16	(0)
2012–2013	Yokohama FC Hong Kong	16	(0)
2013–2016	Tai Po	40	(4)
2016–2018	Sparta Rotterdam Mutual	43	(19)
2018–2019	Tai Po	1	(0)
2019	→ Wong Tai Sin (loan)	11	(2)
2019–2021	Happy Valley	25	(0)
2021–2023	North District	33	(2)
2023–2024	Sai Kung	22	(2)
2025–	Artilheiros		

International career^{‡}
- Hong Kong U-15
2017–2019	Macau	7	(0)
- * Club domestic league appearances and goals as of 30 June 2024 ‡ National team caps and goals as of 6 June 2019 (UTC)

Lam Ngai Tong (Chinese: 林毅東; born 13 January 1990) is a former Macanese professional footballer who played as a defender.

== Club career ==
After stints at Sham Shui Po and Yokohama FC Hong Kong, Lam moved to Tai Po. His time at Tai Po saw the club win the 2013–14 Hong Kong Second Division and 2015–16 Hong Kong First Division titles. However, upon the club's promotion to the Hong Kong Premier League in 2016, Lam declined to re-sign with the club in order to continue working as a physical education teacher.

In September 2016, Lee decided to resume his career at Hong Kong Second Division club Sparta Rotterdam Mutual.

On 31 July 2018, Lam confirmed to the media that he would resign his teaching post in order to return to Tai Po as a full-time professional footballer.

On 12 July 2019, Lam moved to Happy Valley.

== International career ==
Lam was born in Macau and moved to Hong Kong in 1993. He is eligible to represent Macau or Hong Kong on the international level. He earned his first cap with Macau on 5 September 2017 in a 2–0 loss to India.

== Career statistics ==
=== Club ===
As of 30 May 2021.

Club	Season	League			FA Cup		League Cup		Continental		Other		Total	
Club	Season	Division	Apps	Goals	Apps	Goals	Apps	Goals	Apps	Goals	Apps	Goals	Apps	Goals
Sham Shui Po	2011–12	Hong Kong First Division	16	0	2	0	2	0	–		0	0	20	0
Yokohama FC (Hong Kong)	2012–13	Hong Kong First Division	16	0	2	0	0	0	–		2 (Note: Appearances in the Hong Kong Senior Shield)	0	20	0
Tai Po	2013–14	Hong Kong Second Division	3	0	1	0	–		–		0	0	4	0
Tai Po	2014–15	Hong Kong Premier League	16	0	2	0	3	0	–		1	1	22	1
Tai Po	2015–16	Hong Kong First Division	21	4	1	0	–		–		0	0	22	4
Tai Po	2016–17	Hong Kong Premier League	1	0	0	0	0	0	–		0	0	1	0
Tai Po	Total		40	4	4	0	3	0	0	0	1	1	48	5
Sparta Rotterdam (Mutual)	2016–17	Hong Kong Second Division	17	8	0	0	–		–		0	0	17	8
Sparta Rotterdam (Mutual)	2017–18	Hong Kong First Division	26	11	0	0	–		–		0	0	26	11
Sparta Rotterdam (Mutual)	Total		43	19	0	0	0	0	0	0	0	0	43	19
Tai Po	2018–19	Hong Kong Premier League	1	0	0	0	–		–		0	0	1	0
Wong Tai Sin (loan)	2018–19	Hong Kong First Division	11	2	0	0	–		–		0	0	11	2
Happy Valley	2019–20	Hong Kong Premier League	14	0	1	0	–		–		1	0	16	0
Happy Valley	2020–21	Hong Kong Premier League	11	0	0	0	–		–		0	0	11	0
Happy Valley	Total		25	0	1	0	0	0	0	0	1	0	27	0
Career total			152	25	9	0	5	0	0	0	4	1	170	26

=== International ===
As of matches played 6 June 2019.

National team	Year	Apps	Goals
Macau	2017	3	0
Macau	2018	3	0
Macau	2019	1	0
Total		7	0
