= Čedomir Mijanović =

Montenegrin footballer

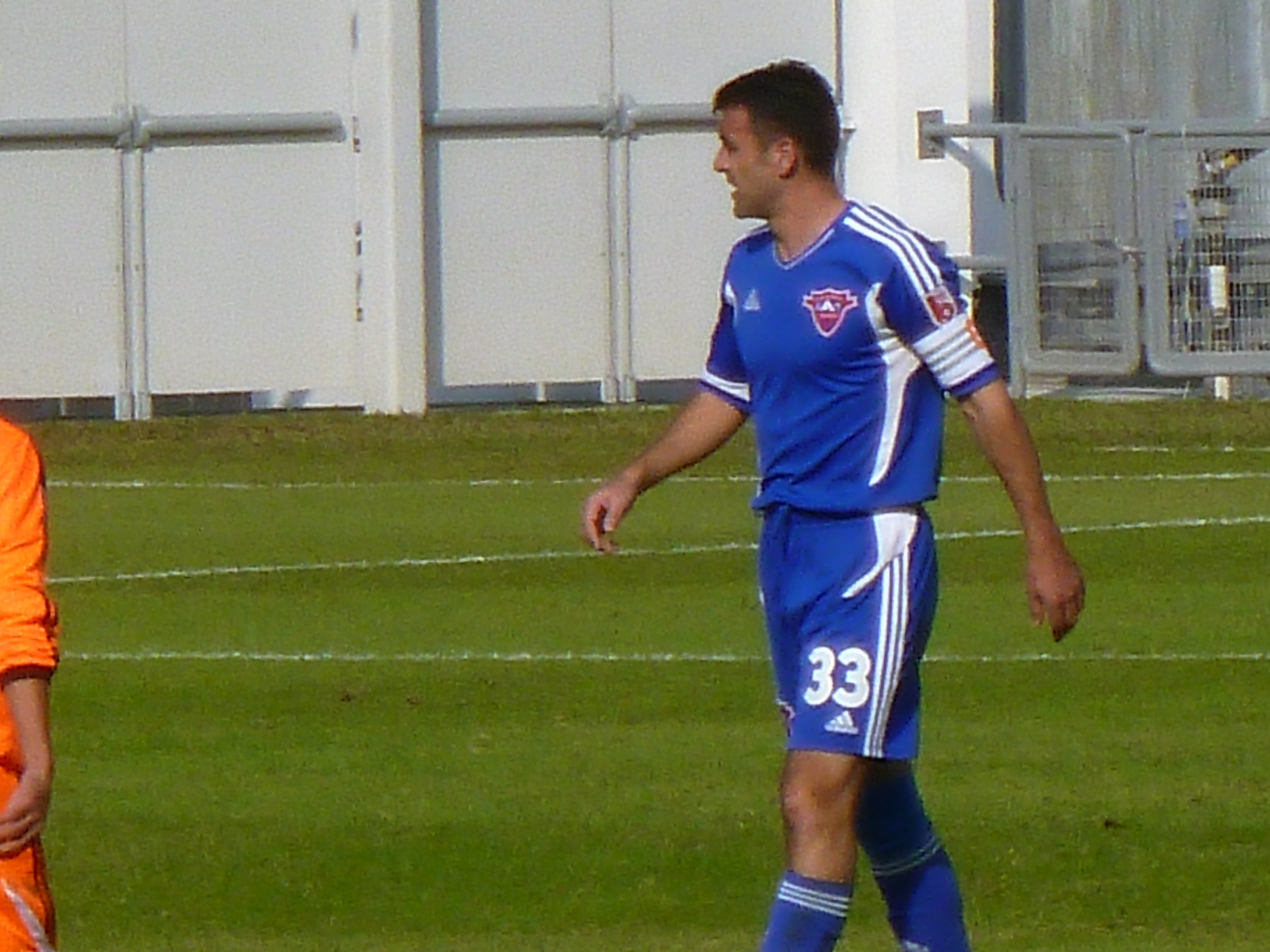
- Mijanović with Tuen Mun in 2011

Personal information
- Full name: Čedomir Mijanović
- Date of birth: 17 January 1980 (age 46)
- Place of birth: Nikšić, SFR Yugoslavia
- Height: 1.82 m (6 ft 0 in)
- Position: Defender

Senior career*
Years	Team	Apps	(Gls)
2001–2002	BASK		
2002–2004	Pobeda	18	(2)
2004–2006	Zemun	58	(2)
2007	Changsha Ginde	26	(0)
2008	Kolubara	15	(0)
2009	Banat Zrenjanin	15	(1)
2010	Srem	11	(0)
2010–2012	Tuen Mun	31	(5)
2012–2013	Yokohama FC Hong Kong	17	(2)
2013–2015	Yuen Long	27	(2)
2016–2017	Easyknit Property	24	(3)
2017–2018	Tung Sing	21	(2)
- * Club domestic league appearances and goals as of 2 July 2018

Čedomir Mijanović (Cyrillic: Чедомир Мијановић; born 17 January 1980) is a Montenegrin retired professional footballer who played as a defender. He has been the head coach of the women's football team TSL FC since 2025.
