= Lau Cheuk Hin =

Hong Kong footballer

Lau Cheuk Hin 劉卓軒
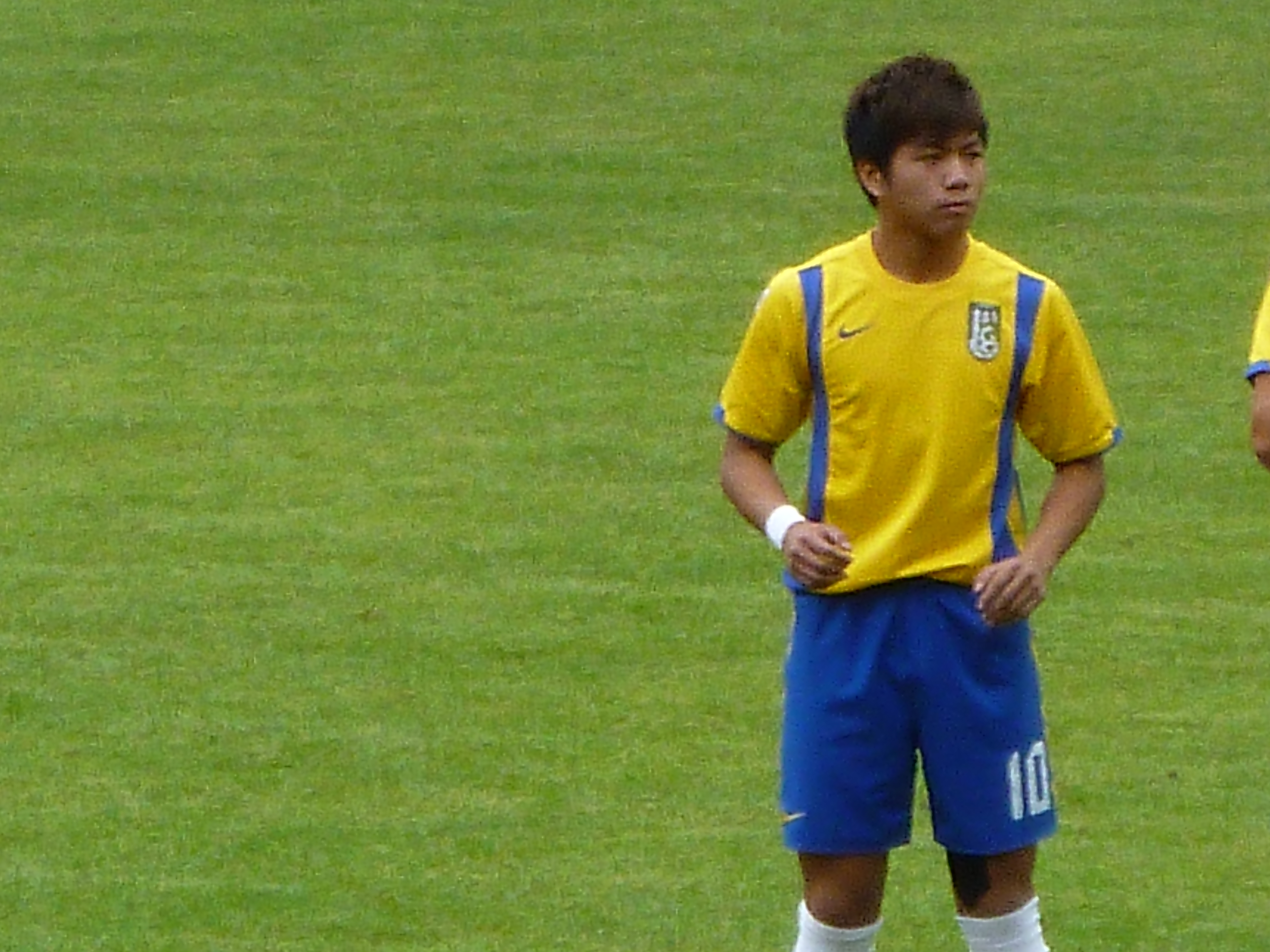

Personal information
- Full name: Lau Cheuk Hin
- Date of birth: 26 April 1992 (age 34)
- Place of birth: Hong Kong
- Height: 1.72 m (5 ft 8 in)
- Position: Midfielder

Senior career*
Years	Team	Apps	(Gls)
2011–2012	Sham Shui Po	17	(3)
2012–2015	YFCMD	25	(2)
2015–2017	South China	1	(0)
2017–2018	Hong Kong Rangers	5	(0)
2018–2019	Kui Tan	8	(4)

International career^{‡}
- Hong Kong U-23
2012	Hong Kong	1	(0)
- * Club domestic league appearances and goals as of 28 January 2018 ‡ National team caps and goals as of 10 June 2012

Lau Cheuk Hin (Chinese: 劉卓軒; Jyutping: lau^{4} coek^{3} hin^{1}; born 26 April 1992 in Hong Kong) is a former Hong Kong professional footballer who played as a midfielder.

== Youth career ==
In January 2011, while playing amateur football for Sham Shui Po, through the Nike The Chance programme, Lau won a place along with 3 other young Chinese footballers in Shanghai, China to fly to the United Kingdom and compete among the 100 players from all over the world, for the 8 available places to train there. In addition to playing for Sham Shui Po, Lau also represented Beacon College's football team, along with 4 other club mates.

== Club career ==
On 14 January 2012, Lau helped Sham Shui Po to a 1–0 win over Hong Kong Sapling in the 2011–12 Hong Kong League Cup first round match. Hong Kong national team coach Ernie Merrick praised his outstanding performance. At the year-end HKFA Award Ceremony, Lau was named the Best Young Player of 2011–12 season. At that time, he was regarded as one of the most talented youth players in Hong Kong. Lau joined Yokohama FC Hong Kong during the summer of 2012.

On 27 June 2017, Lau signed with Rangers. However, he struggled with fitness issues and eventually left the club in January 2018.

== International career ==
On 10 June 2012, Lau made his international debut in a friendly match against Vietnam.

== Personal life ==
On 14 January 2012, after the victory over Hong Kong Sapling, Lau gave his father a T-shirt written with the words Father, Happy Birthday, I love you as his father's 52nd birthday present.

== Career statistics ==
=== International ===
As of 10 June 2012

#	Date	Venue	Opponent	Result	Scored	Competition
1	10 June 2012	Mong Kok Stadium, Hong Kong	Vietnam	1–2	0	Friendly

Awards
Preceded by James Ha; To Hon To	Hong Kong Top Footballer Awards Best Youth Player with Lam Hok Hei; 2011–12	Succeeded by Yapp Hung Fai; Lam Hok Hei
