= Li Jian (footballer, born 1986) =

Chinese-born Hong Kong footballer

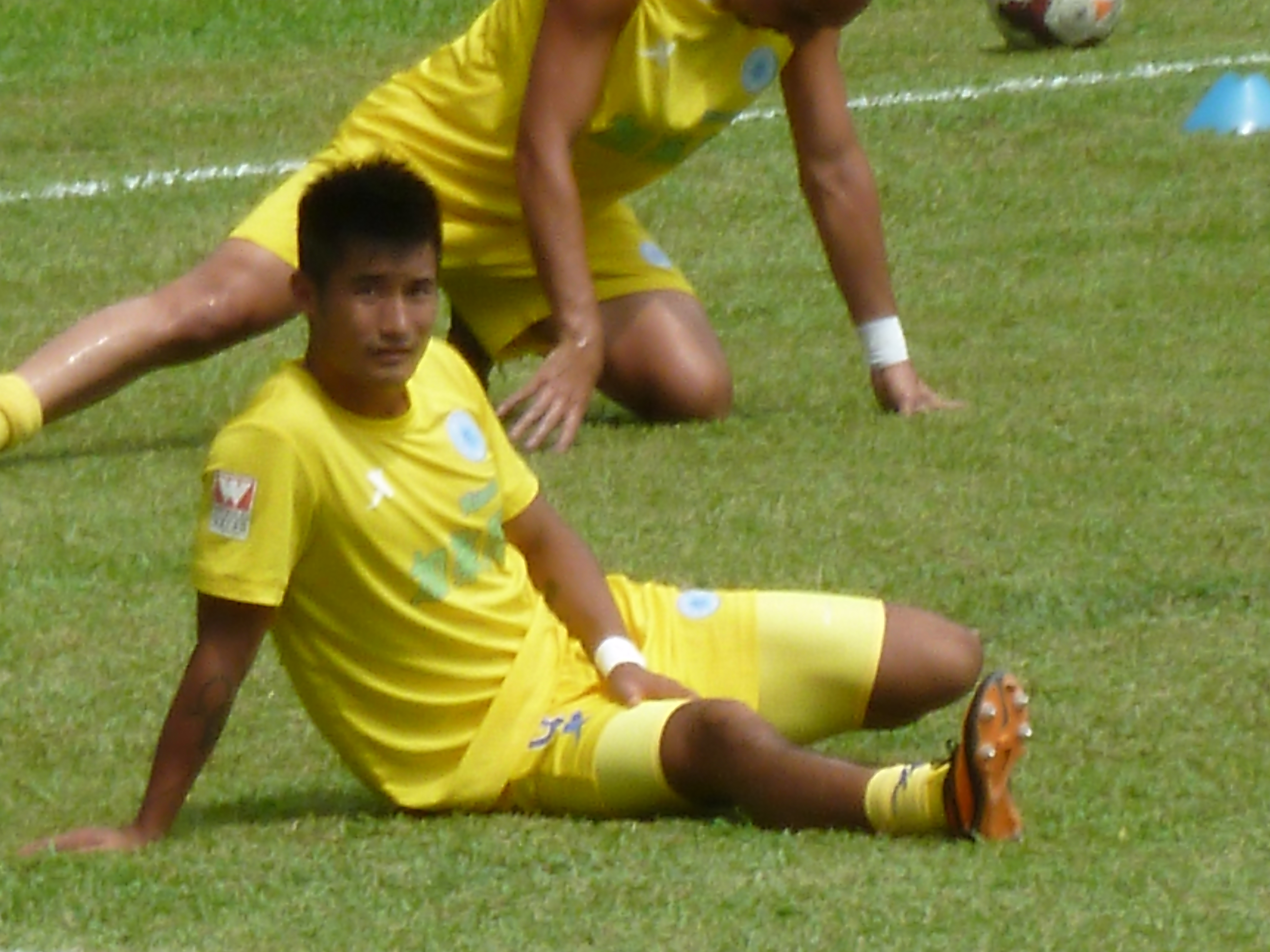

Personal information
- Full name: Li Jian
- Date of birth: 5 February 1986 (age 40)
- Place of birth: Nanjing, Jiangsu, China
- Height: 1.80 m (5 ft 11 in)
- Position: Midfielder

Senior career*
Years	Team	Apps	(Gls)
2007–2010	Wenzhou Provenza		
2010–2012	Fourway Rangers	15	(5)
2012–2014	Hong Kong Rangers	11	(0)
2012–2013	→ Yokohama FC Hong Kong (loan)	4	(0)
2014	Happy Valley	1	(0)
2014–2015	Pegasus	1	(0)
2014–2015	→ Wong Tai Sin (loan)	12	(4)
2015	Hong Kong Rangers	3	(0)
2015–2016	Wong Tai Sin	9	(0)
2016	Shenzhen Yisheng		
2017	Suzhou Dongwu	4	(0)
2025	WSE	7	(3)
- * Club domestic league appearances and goals

Li Jian (Chinese: 李鍵, born 5 February 1986) is a Chinese former professional footballer. His position is striker and is famous for his high speed. Before coming to Hong Kong, he played for Wenzhou Provenza in China.
