= Chan Siu Kwan =

Hong Kong footballer (born 1992)

Chan Siu Kwan 陳肇鈞
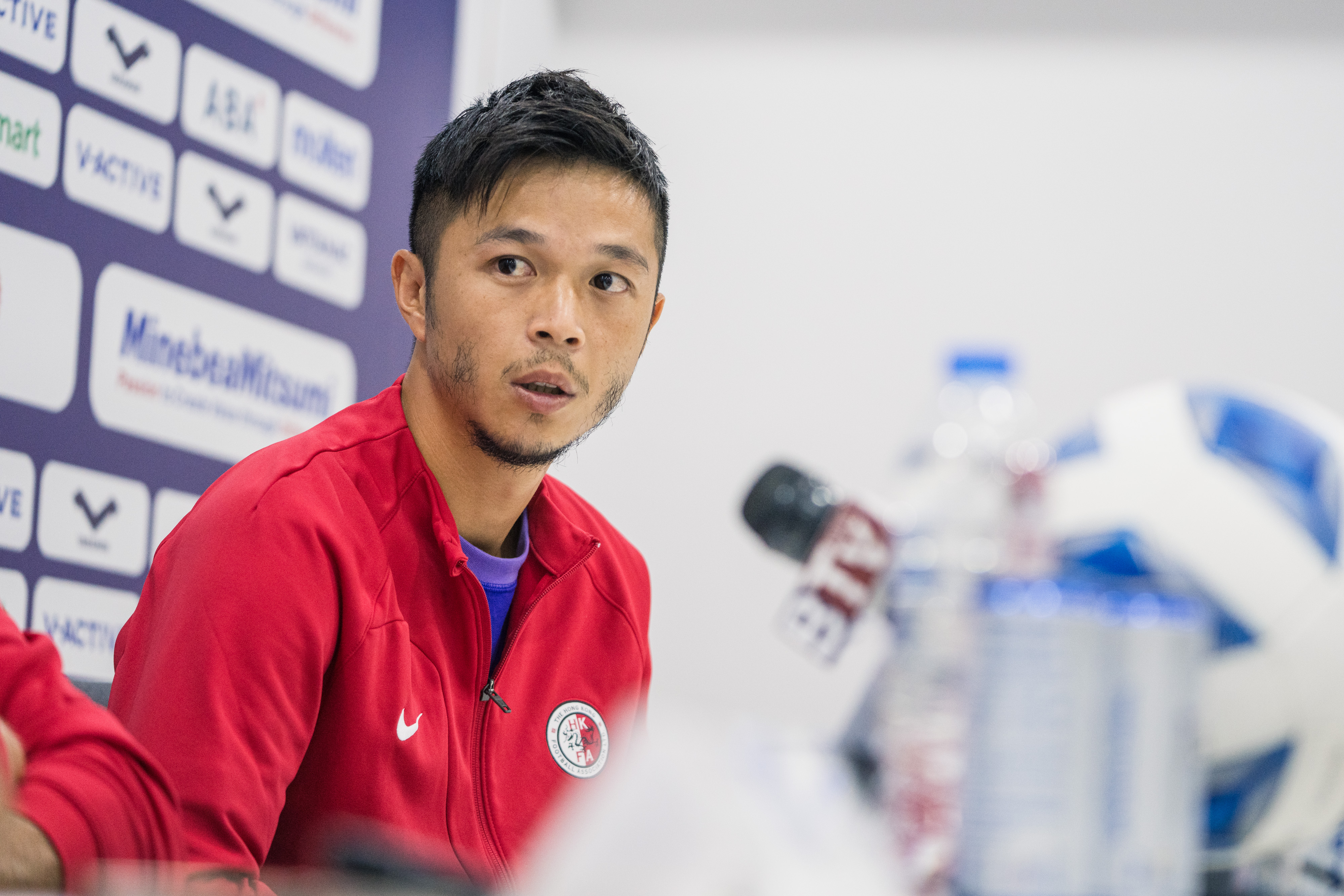
- Chan attends a press conference in 2023

Personal information
- Full name: Philip Chan Siu Kwan
- Date of birth: 1 August 1992 (age 34)
- Place of birth: British Hong Kong
- Height: 1.72 m (5 ft 8 in)
- Position: Central midfielder

Team information
- Current team: Tai Po
- Number: 16

Youth career
- 2006: Grêmio

Senior career*
Years	Team	Apps	(Gls)
2011–2012	Sham Shui Po	17	(0)
2012–2013	Yokohoma FC Hong Kong	14	(0)
2013–2017	South China	41	(3)
2017–2018	Eastern	1	(0)
2018	→ Southern (loan)	8	(1)
2018–2019	Tai Po	18	(6)
2019–2021	Southern	12	(1)
2021	Rangers (HKG)	14	(2)
2021–2022	Kitchee	2	(2)
2023	Resources Capital	10	(1)
2023–	Tai Po	67	(25)

International career^{‡}
2014	Hong Kong U-23	4	(2)
2019–	Hong Kong	37	(8)
Medal record
Men's football
Representing Hong Kong
FIFA ASEAN Challenge Cup
Winner	2026 Hong Kong
- * Club domestic league appearances and goals as of 21 November 2026 ‡ National team caps and goals as of 3 October 2026

Philip Chan Siu Kwan (Chinese: 陳肇鈞; Cantonese Yale: Chàn Siuhgwān; born 1 August 1992) is a Hong Kong professional footballer who currently plays as a central midfielder for Hong Kong Premier League club Tai Po and the Hong Kong national team.

== Early life ==
Chan trained with Brazilian team Grêmio when he was 14 and joined the youth academy in 2006.

He graduated from the University of Hong Kong in 2016, majoring in Exercise and Health.

== Club career ==
In 2011, along with his club Sham Shui Po's promotion to the Hong Kong First Division, he started playing as a professional player. On 8 January 2012, Chan was sent off in the match against Hong Kong Sapling after receiving two yellow cards. Towards the end of the 2012 season he has established himself as a hard-tackling defensive midfielder.

After returning from a short training period with mainland Chinese side Guangzhou R&F, Chan returned to Hong Kong and joined Yokohama FC Hong Kong in summer of 2012.

In June 2013, Chan completed a transfer to Hong Kong giants South China and was handed the number 16 shirt.

On 18 July 2017, Chan joined Eastern after South China's decision to self-relegate. On 4 January 2018, he was loaned to Southern for the remainder of the 2017–18 season.

On 19 July 2018, Eastern chairman Peter Leung confirmed that Chan had been transferred to Hong Kong Premier League club Tai Po.

On 1 July 2019, Chan returned to Southern.

On 2 March 2021, Chan joined Rangers.

On 29 September 2021, Chan joined Kitchee.

On 1 July 2022, Chan left Kitchee.

On 24 January 2023, Chan joined Resources Capital. He instantly found his place in the first team and played full 90 minutes in his second and thirds HKPL match for the club against HKFC and Shum Shui Po respectively.

On 19 July 2023, Chan returned to Tai Po after 4 years.

At the end of the 2023–24 season, Chan was named Hong Kong's Footballer of the Year for 2024.

== International career ==
=== Hong Kong U-21 ===
Chan is a member of the Hong Kong national under-21 football team. On 15 November 2011, he scored the equalising goal against Russia U-19 in the game that celebrated Mong Kok Stadium's reopening after renovation, but Hong Kong U-21 lost 1–2 in the end.

Chan received his first call-up for the Hong Kong senior team in July 2012 by new coach Ernie Merrick against Singapore, but he failed to make a debut.

=== Hong Kong ===
On 11 June 2019, Chan made his international debut for Hong Kong in a friendly match against Chinese Taipei.

On 11 June 2022, Chan scored his first international goal against Cambodia.

On 26 December 2023, Chan was named in Hong Kong's squad for the 2023 AFC Asian Cup. On 14 January 2024, he scored Hong Kong's first goal of the tournament in a 1–3 loss to United Arab Emirates. The goal was also the 1000th goal in the history of the AFC Asian Cup.

== Club statistics ==
=== Club ===
As of 19 May 2021

Club	Season	Division	League		Senior Shield		League Cup		FA Cup		AFC Cup		Total	
Club	Season	Division	Apps	Goals	Apps	Goals	Apps	Goals	Apps	Goals	Apps	Goals	Apps	Goals
Sham Shui Po	2011–12	First Division	10	0	–		1	0	2	0	–		12	0
Dreams Metro Gallery	2012–13	First Division	11	0	0	0	–		1	0	–		12	0
South China	2013–14	First Division	5	0	0	0	–		0	0	0	0	5	0
South China	2014–15	First Division	5	1	1	0	2	0	1	0	9	1	18	2
South China	2015–16	First Division	3	0	0	0	2	0	0	0	6	1	11	1
South China	2016–17	First Division	12	2	0	0	–		4	1	–		16	3
Eastern	2017–18	First Division	0	0	0	0	–		–		–		0	0
Southern	2017–18	First Division	6	1	–		–		2	1	–		8	2
Tai Po	2018–19	First Division	12	6	4	2	–		1	0	6	2	23	10
Southern	2019–20	First Division	11	1	1	0	–		1	0	–		13	1
Rangers	2020–21	First Division	10	2	–		–		–		–		10	2
	Total		85	13	6	2	5	0	12	2	21	4	128	21

=== International ===
As of 3 October 2026

National team	Year	Apps	Goals
Hong Kong	2019	2	0
Hong Kong	2020	0	0
Hong Kong	2021	0	0
Hong Kong	2022	6	1
Hong Kong	2023	9	2
Hong Kong	2024	13	3
Hong Kong	2025	4	1
Hong Kong	2026	3	1
Total		37	8

#	Date	Venue	Opponent	Result	Competition
2019
1	11 June 2019	Mong Kok Stadium, Hong Kong	Chinese Taipei	0–2	Friendly
2	14 December 2019	Busan Gudeok Stadium, Busan, South Korea	Japan	0–5	2019 EAFF E-1 Football Championship
2022
3	1 June 2022	National Stadium Bukit Jalil, Kuala Lumpur, Malaysia	Malaysia	0–2	Friendly
4	8 June 2022	Salt Lake Stadium, Kolkata, India	Afghanistan	2–1	2023 AFC Asian Cup qualification – third round
5	11 June 2022	Salt Lake Stadium, Kolkata, India	Cambodia	3–0	2023 AFC Asian Cup qualification – third round
6	14 June 2022	Salt Lake Stadium, Kolkata, India	India	0–4	2023 AFC Asian Cup qualification – third round
7	21 September 2022	Mong Kok Stadium, Mong Kok, Hong Kong	Myanmar	2–0	Friendly
8	24 September 2022	Hong Kong Stadium, Hong Kong	Myanmar	0–0	Friendly
2023
9	23 March 2023	Mong Kok Stadium, Mong Kok, Hong Kong	Singapore	1–1	Friendly
10	28 March 2023	Sultan Ibrahim Stadium, Johor, Malaysia	Malaysia	0–2	Friendly
11	15 June 2023	Lạch Tray Stadium, Hai Phong, Hong Kong	Vietnam	0–1	Friendly
12	7 September 2023	Phnom Penh Olympic Stadium, Phnom Penh, Cambodia	Cambodia	1–1	Friendly
13	11 September 2023	Hong Kong Stadium, So Kon Po, Hong Kong	Brunei	10–0	Friendly
14	12 October 2023	Hong Kong Stadium, So Kon Po, Hong Kong	Bhutan	4–0	2026 FIFA World Cup qualification – AFC first round
15	17 October 2023	Changlimithang Stadium, Thimphu, Bhutan	Bhutan	0–2	2026 FIFA World Cup qualification – AFC first round
16	16 November 2023	Azadi Stadium, Tehran, Iran	Iran	0–4	2026 FIFA World Cup qualification – AFC second round
17	21 November 2023	Hong Kong Stadium, So Kon Po, Hong Kong	Turkmenistan	2–2	2026 FIFA World Cup qualification – AFC second round
2024
18	1 January 2024	Baniyas Stadium, Abu Dhabi, United Arab Emirates	China	2–1	Friendly
19	14 January 2024	Khalifa International Stadium, Al Rayyan, Qatar	United Arab Emirates	1–3	2023 AFC Asian Cup
20	19 January 2024	Khalifa International Stadium, Al Rayyan, Qatar	Iran	0–1	2023 AFC Asian Cup
21	23 January 2024	Abdullah bin Khalifa Stadium, Doha, Qatar	Palestine	0–3	2023 AFC Asian Cup
22	21 March 2024	Mong Kok Stadium, Mong Kok, Hong Kong	Uzbekistan	0–2	2026 FIFA World Cup qualification – AFC second round
23	26 March 2024	Milliy Stadium, Tashkent, Uzbekistan	Uzbekistan	0–3	2026 FIFA World Cup qualification – AFC second round
24	6 June 2024	Hong Kong Stadium, So Kon Po, Hong Kong	Iran	2–4	2026 FIFA World Cup qualification – AFC second round
25	11 June 2024	Ashgabat Stadium, Ashgabat, Turkmenistan	Turkmenistan	0–0	2026 FIFA World Cup qualification – AFC second round

=== International goals ===
No.	Date	Cap	Venue	Opponent	Score	Result	Competition
1	11 June 2022	5	Salt Lake Stadium, Kolkata, India	Cambodia	3–0	3–0	2023 AFC Asian Cup qualification
2	11 September 2023	13	Hong Kong Stadium, So Kon Po, Hong Kong	Brunei	7–0	10–0	Friendly
3	11 September 2023	13	Hong Kong Stadium, So Kon Po, Hong Kong	Brunei	8–0	10–0	Friendly
4	14 January 2024	19	Khalifa International Stadium, Al Rayyan, Qatar	United Arab Emirates	1–1	1–3	2023 AFC Asian Cup
5	17 December 2024	30	Hong Kong Stadium, So Kon Po, Hong Kong	Guam	1–0	5–0	2025 EAFF E-1 Football Championship qualifying
6	17 December 2024	30	Hong Kong Stadium, So Kon Po, Hong Kong	Guam	4–0	5–0	2025 EAFF E-1 Football Championship qualifying
7	7 September 2025	33	Kanchanaburi Province Stadium, Kanchanaburi, Thailand	Fiji	8–0	8–0	2025 King's Cup
8	30 September 2026	36	Kai Tak Stadium, Kowloon, Hong Kong	Brunei	1–0	2–0	2026 FIFA ASEAN Challenge Cup

== Honours ==
=== Club ===
Tai Po

- Hong Kong Premier League: 2018–19, 2024–25
- Hong Kong FA Cup: 2025–26
- Hong Kong Senior Shield: 2025–26

=== International ===
Hong Kong

- FIFA ASEAN Challenge Cup: 2026

=== Individual ===
- Hong Kong Young Players of the Year: 2014–15
- Hong Kong Footballer of the Year: 2023–24
- Hong Kong Most Favourite Player of the Year: 2023–24
- Hong Kong Best HKRT Player in the HKPL: 2023–24
- Hong Kong Premier League Team of the Year: 2023–24

== Personal life ==
Chan's father Chan Pak Hung was the Hong Kong Jockey Champion in the 1986/1987 racing season and previously worked as a horse trainer for both the Hong Kong Jockey Club and the Macau Jockey Club. Chan also studied at Hong Lok Yuen International School and French International School in Hong Kong. He also completed International Baccalaureate at South Island School. He then completed his degree in Sports Science at the University of Hong Kong and graduated in 2016.
