= Lee Ka Ho =

Hong Kong football player

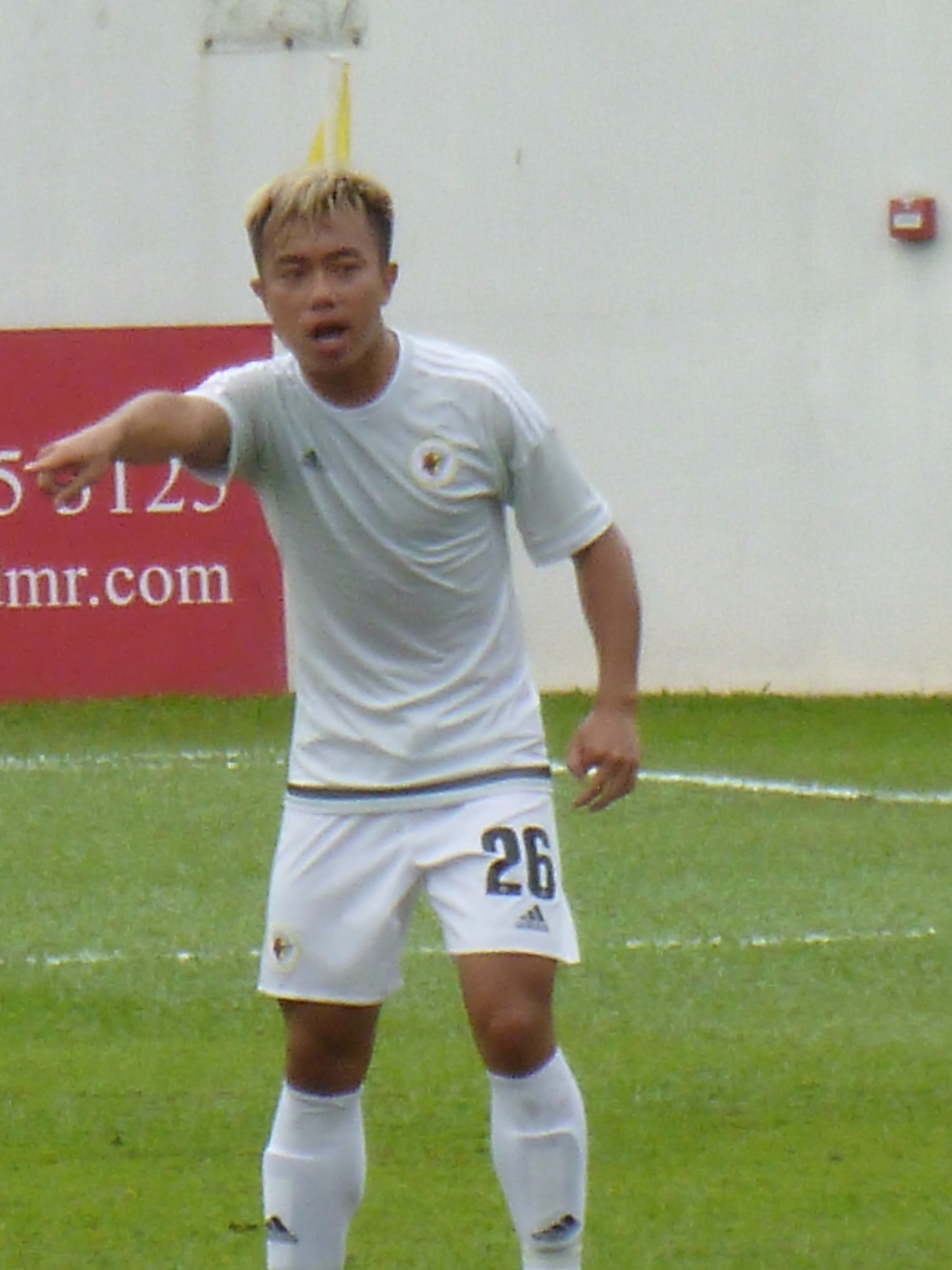

Personal information
- Full name: Lee Ka Ho
- Date of birth: 26 April 1993 (age 33)
- Place of birth: Hong Kong
- Height: 1.73 m (5 ft 8 in)
- Position: Right back

Team information
- Current team: Tai Po
- Number: 26

Senior career*
Years	Team	Apps	(Gls)
2011–2012	Sham Shui Po	6	(0)
2012–2015	YFCMD	24	(1)
2015–2016	Pegasus	11	(0)
2018–2019	Tai Po	12	(1)
2019–2020	Eastern	3	(0)
2020–2022	Eastern District	21	(1)
2022–	Tai Po	78	(3)

International career
2015	Hong Kong U-22	2	(0)
- * Club domestic league appearances and goals as of 21 November 2026

Lee Ka Ho (Chinese: 李家豪; born 26 April 1993) is a Hong Kong professional footballer who currently plays as a right back for Hong Kong Premier League club Tai Po.

== Club career ==
In 2011, Lee signed for Hong Kong First Division club Sham Shui Po.

On 25 February 2013, Lee made his debut for Sham Shui Po and scored his first goal against Pegasus in a 1–4 loss.

In 2012, Lee signed for Hong Kong First Division League club Yokohama FC Hong Kong (YFCMD).

On 2 September 2012, Lee scored his first goal in Yokohama FC Hong Kong against South China in a 2–5 loss.

On 8 July 2015, Lee signed for Hong Kong Premier League club Pegasus.

On 21 July 2018, following two years away from football, Lee agreed to join Tai Po.

On 17 July 2019, Eastern announced the signing of Lee at their season-opening media event. On 30 June 2020, Lee left the club.

On 8 August 2022, Lee returned to Tai Po.

== International career ==
On 1 July 2025, Lee was selected into the final squad of the Hong Kong national team for the first time for the Final Round of the 2025 EAFF E-1 Football Championship. However, he was an unused substitute throughout the competition.

== Honours ==
=== Club ===
Pegasus

- Hong Kong FA Cup: 2015–16
- Hong Kong Sapling Cup: 2015–16

Tai Po

- Hong Kong Premier League: 2018–19, 2024–25
- Hong Kong FA Cup: 2025–26
- Hong Kong Senior Shield: 2025–26

== Match Fixing Scandal ==
On 6 October 2016, Lee was one of six current and former Pegasus players to be taken in for questioning by the ICAC on allegations of match fixing. He was formally charged on 28 June 2017 for one count each of conspiracy to defraud and accepting an advantage, including allegedly accepting a HKD $20,000 bribe in order to fix a reserve league match in March 2016.

On 19 April 2018, Lee was found not guilty on both charges after the judge ruled that he could not convict him beyond a reasonable doubt.
