= 2012–13 Sun Hei SC season =

Sunray Cave JC Sun Hei
2012–13 season
- Head Coach: Chiu Chong Man
- Home ground: Mong Kok Stadium
- First Division: 7th
- Senior Shield: Quarter-finals
- FA Cup: Quarter-finals
- AFC Cup: Group stage
- Top goalscorer: League: Mamadou Barry (7); All: Mamadou Barry (10)
- Highest home attendance: 3,333 (9 September vs South China, First Division)
- Lowest home attendance: 318 (20 December vs Citizen, First Division)
- Average home league attendance: 988 (in all competitions)
| Home colours | Away colours |

The 2012–13 season was Sunray Cave JC Sun Hei's 12th season in the Hong Kong First Division League. They started as the defending champions having won the Senior Challenge Shield last season. As the champions of 2011–12 Hong Kong Senior Challenge Shield, they competed in the 2013 AFC Cup. They also competed in the Hong Kong First Division League and the FA Cup.

== Key Events ==
- 25 May 2012: Midfielder Michael Luk and defender Jack Sealy join South China for an undisclosed fee.
- 16 July 2012: Sunray Cave JC Sun Hei were back in training after season break. 12 new players have joined the team, including Cheung Kin Fung, Cheung Chi Yung, Chow Kwok Wai, Zhang Chunhui, Yuen Tsun Nam.
- 23 October 2012: Due to the poor result in the beginning of the season, Tim Bredbury's contract was terminated by the club.
- 11 December 2012: South African forward Makhosonke Bhengu is released by the club due to discipline reason.
- 7 January 2013: Hong Kong international left back Cheung Kin Fung leaves the club and signs a 6-month contract with Kitchee. At the same time, James Ha and Liang Zicheng are loaned from Kitchee until the end of the season.
- 31 January 2013: Cameroonian forward Yrel Cedrique Arnaud Bouet joins the club for an undisclosed fee.
- 31 January 2013: Hong Kong midfielder Yeung Chi Lun joins the club from Biu Chun Rangers for an undisclosed fee.

== Players ==
=== First team ===
As of 31 January 2013.

Note: Flags indicate national team as defined under FIFA eligibility rules; some limited exceptions apply. Players may hold more than one non-FIFA nationality.

| No. | Pos. | Nation | Player |
|---|---|---|---|
| 4 | DF | HKG | Pak Wing Chak |
| 5 | DF | HKG | Li Hang Wui |
| 6 | DF | CMR | Jean-Jacques Kilama^{FP} |
| 7 | FW | HKG | Tsang Kin Fong (on loan from Kitchee) |
| 8 | MF | HKG | James Ha (on loan from Kitchee) |
| 9 | FW | GUI | Mamadou Barry^{FP} |
| 10 | FW | CMR | Yrel Cedrique Arnaud Bouet^{FP} |
| 11 | MF | HKG | Cheung Kwok Ming |
| 12 | GK | HKG | Zhang Chunhui |
| 13 | FW | CHN | Liang Zicheng (on loan from Kitchee) |
| 14 | MF | HKG | Chow Kwok Wai |

| No. | Pos. | Nation | Player |
|---|---|---|---|
| 15 | DF | HKG | Wong Chun Ho |
| 16 | DF | HKG | Leung Ka Hai (on loan from Kitchee) |
| 17 | GK | HKG | Ho Kwok Chuen |
| 18 | GK | HKG | Cheung King Wah |
| 19 | MF | CHN | Su Yang |
| 21 | DF | HKG | Yuen Tsun Nam |
| 23 | DF | HKG | Cheung Chi Yung |
| 25 | MF | ESP | Jose Maria Diaz Munoz^{FP} |
| 26 | FW | HKG | Leung Tsz Chun |
| 28 | MF | BRA | Roberto Júnior^{FP} |
| 38 | MF | HKG | Kot Cho Wai |

Remarks:
^{NP} These players are registered as foreign players.

Players with dual nationality:

- (China) (Hong Kong) Su Yang (Local player)
- (China) Zhang Chunhui (Local player, eligible to play for Hong Kong national football team)
- (China) Liang Zicheng (Local player, eligible to play for Hong Kong national football team)
- (Brazil) Leung Ka Hai (Local player, eligible to play for Hong Kong national football team)
- (England) James Ha (Local player, eligible to play for Hong Kong national football team)

=== Transfers ===
==== In ====
| Squad # | Position | Player | Transferred from | Fee | Date | Team | Source |
|---|---|---|---|---|---|---|---|
| 13 | DF | (Hong Kong) Cheung Kin Fung | TSW Pegasus | Undisclosed | 16 July 2012 | First Team | |
| 1 | GK | (Hong Kong) Zhang Chunhui | South China | Free transfer | 16 July 2012 | First Team | |
| 21 | DF | (Hong Kong) Cheung Chi Yung | Wofoo Tai Po | Undisclosed | 16 July 2012 | First Team | |
| 7 | DF | (Hong Kong) Yuen Tsun Nam | TSW Pegasus | Undisclosed | 16 July 2012 | First Team | |
| 38 | MF | (Hong Kong) Kot Cho Wai | South China | Undisclosed | 16 July 2012 | First Team | |
| 17 | MF | (Hong Kong) Cheung Kwok Ming | Citizen | Undisclosed | 16 July 2012 | First Team | |
| 18 | MF | (China) Liang Yue Ming | Citizen | Undisclosed | 16 July 2012 | First Team | |
| 27 | MF | (China) Su Yang | Kitchee | Undisclosed | | First team | |
| 10 | FW | (Cameroon) Yrel Cedrique Arnaud Bouet | Free Agent | Free transfer | 31 January 2013 | First Team | |
| 27 | MF | (Hong Kong) Yeung Chi Lun | Biu Chun Rangers | Undisclosed | 31 January 2013 | First Team | |

==== Out ====
| Squad # | Position | Player | Transferred to | Fee | Date | Team | Source |
|---|---|---|---|---|---|---|---|
| 1 | GK | (China) Hou Yu | Guangdong Sunray Cave | End of loan | | First team | |
| 3 | DF | (Hong Kong) Cristiano Cordeiro | Retired | N/A | 2 June 2012 | First team | |
| 8 | MF | (China) Li Ming | Tuen Mun | Undisclosed | | First tea | |
| 8 | MF | (Republic of the Congo) Edson Minga | Released | Free transfer | 1 July 2012 | First Team | |
| 10 | MF | (Canada) (Hong Kong) Michael Luk | South China | Undisclosed | 25 May 2012 | First Team | |
| 16 | DF | (Hong Kong) (Brazil) Gerard Ambassa Guy | Released | | | First Team | |
| 19 | FW | (Hong Kong) Cheng Siu Wai | Kitchee | Undisclosed | 31 May 2012 | First team | |
| 22 | DF | (Hong Kong) (England) Jack Sealy | South China | Undisclosed | 25 May 2012 | First Team | |
| 25 | MF | (Hong Kong) Wong Chun Yue | Eastern | Free transfer | 18 August 2012 | First Team | |
| 10 | FW | (South Africa) Makhosonke Bhengu | Released | Free transfer | 11 December 2012 | First Team | |

==== Loan In ====
| # | Position | Player | Loaned from | Fee | Date | Team | Source |
|---|---|---|---|---|---|---|---|
| 19 | FW | (Hong Kong) Tsang Kin Fong | Kitchee | Undisclosed | 7 July 2012 | First team | |
| 30 | DF | (Hong Kong) (Brazil) Leung Robson Augusto Ka Hai | Kitchee | Undisclosed | | First team | |
| 8 | MF | (Hong Kong) James Ha | Kitchee | Undisclosed | 7 January 2013 | First team | |
| 13 | FW | (China) Liang Zicheng | Kitchee | Undisclosed | 7 January 2013 | First Team | |

==== Loan Out ====
| # | Position | Player | Loaned to | Fee | Date | Team | Source |
|---|---|---|---|---|---|---|---|
| 13 | DF | (Hong Kong) Cheung Kin Fung | Kitchee | Undisclosed | 7 January 2013 | Sunray Cave JC Sun Hei | |

== Stats ==
=== Squad Stats ===
| | | | | Total | | | | Hong Kong First Division League | | Senior Challenge Shield | | FA Cup | | AFC Cup | | |
| N | Pos. | Name | Nat. | GS | App | Gls | Min | App | Gls | App | Gls | App | Gls | App | Gls | Notes |
|---|---|---|---|---|---|---|---|---|---|---|---|---|---|---|---|---|
| 12 | GK | Zhang Chunhui | (Hong Kong) | 20 | 20 | -31 | 1673 | 13 | -20 | 2 | -2 | 1 | -3 | 4 | -6 | (−) GA |
| 17 | GK | Ho Kwok Chuen | (Hong Kong) | 3 | 4 | -8 | 347 | 4 | -8 | | | | | | | (−) GA, on loan to Sun Pegasus in January 2013 |
| 22 | GK | Cheung King Wah | (Hong Kong) | 5 | 6 | -14 | 452 | 3 | -5 | | | 1 | -3 | 2 | -6 | (−) GA |
| 4 | DF | Pak Wing Chak | (Hong Kong) | 23 | 26 | | 2010 | 18 | | 1 | | 2 | | 5 | | |
| 5 | DF | Li Hang Wui | (Hong Kong) | 21 | 23 | | 1849 | 14 | | 2 | | 2 | | 5 | | |
| 6 | DF | Jean-Jacques Kilama | (Cameroon) | 23 | 24 | | 2029 | 16 | | 2 | | 1 | | 5 | | |
| 15 | DF | Wong Chun Ho | (Hong Kong) | 21 | 26 | | 1827 | 17 | | 2 | | 2 | | 5 | | |
| 16 | DF | Leung Ka Hai | (Hong Kong) | 8 | 12 | | 644 | 6 | | 2 | | 2 | | 2 | | on loan from Kitchee in September 2012 |
| 21 | DF | Yuen Tsun Nam | (Hong Kong) | 3 | 6 | | 258 | 1 | | | | 1 | | 4 | | |
| 23 | DF | Cheung Chi Yung | (Hong Kong) | 8 | 15 | | 860 | 10 | | | | 1 | | 4 | | |
| | DF | Cheung Kin Fung | (Hong Kong) | 11 | 11 | 1 | 990 | 9 | | 2 | 1 | | | | | on loan to Kitchee in January 2013 |
| 8 | MF | James Ha | (Hong Kong) | 3 | 6 | 2 | 317 | 4 | 2 | | | | | 2 | | on loan from Kitchee in January 2013 |
| 11 | MF | Cheung Kwok Ming | (Hong Kong) | 11 | 17 | 1 | 980 | 10 | 1 | 2 | | | | 5 | | |
| 14 | MF | Chow Kwok Wai | (Hong Kong) | 7 | 17 | 2 | 825 | 9 | 1 | 1 | | 2 | | 5 | 1 | |
| 19 | MF | Su Yang | (China) | 9 | 13 | | 699 | 9 | | 1 | | 1 | | 2 | | |
| 25 | MF | Jose Maria Diaz Munoz | (Spain) | 16 | 17 | 3 | 1301 | 13 | 3 | 2 | | 2 | | | | |
| 27 | MF | Yeung Chi Lun | (Hong Kong) | 13 | 13 | 1 | 1082 | 7 | | | | 1 | | 5 | 1 | |
| 28 | MF | Roberto Júnior | (Brazil) | 26 | 25 | 5 | 2291 | 16 | 3 | 2 | | 1 | | 6 | 2 | |
| 38 | MF | Kot Cho Wai | (Hong Kong) | 4 | 15 | 1 | 561 | 9 | 1 | | | 1 | | 5 | | |
| 7 | FW | Tsang Kin Fong | (Hong Kong) | 4 | 7 | | 280 | 4 | | 2 | | 1 | | | | |
| 9 | FW | Mamadou Barry | (Guinea) | 21 | 23 | 10 | 1855 | 16 | 7 | 1 | | 1 | | 5 | 3 | |
| 10 | FW | Yrel Cedrique Arnaud Bouet | (Cameroon) | 7 | 9 | | 553 | 7 | | | | 2 | | | | |
| 13 | FW | Liang Zicheng | (China) | 14 | 14 | 3 | 1162 | 8 | 1 | | | 1 | | 5 | 2 | on loan from Kitchee in January 2013 |
| 26 | FW | Leung Tsz Chun | (Hong Kong) | 25 | 27 | 8 | 2101 | 17 | 5 | 2 | | 2 | | 6 | 3 | |
| | FW | Makhosonke Bhengu | (South Africa) | 3 | 5 | | 328 | 5 | | | | | | | | left in December 2012 |

Last updated: 4 May 2013
Ordered by Position
0 shown as blank

=== Top scorers ===
As of 4 May 2013

| Place | Position | Nationality | Number | Name | First Division League | Senior Challenge Shield | FA Cup | AFC Cup | Total |
|---|---|---|---|---|---|---|---|---|---|
| 1 | FW | (Guinea) | 9 | Mamadou Barry | 7 | 0 | 0 | 3 | 10 |
| 2 | FW | (Hong Kong) | 26 | Leung Tsz Chun | 5 | 0 | 0 | 3 | 8 |
| 3 | MF | (Brazil) | 28 | Roberto Júnior | 3 | 0 | 0 | 2 | 5 |
| =4 | FW | (China) | 13 | Liang Zicheng | 1 | 0 | 0 | 2 | 3 |
| =4 | MF | (Spain) | 25 | Jose Maria Diaz Munoz | 3 | 0 | 0 | 0 | 3 |
| =6 | MF | (Hong Kong) | 8 | James Ha | 2 | 0 | 0 | 0 | 2 |
| =6 | MF | (Hong Kong) | 14 | Chow Kwok Wai | 1 | 0 | 0 | 1 | 2 |
| =8 | MF | (Hong Kong) | 11 | Cheung Kwok Ming | 1 | 0 | 0 | 0 | 1 |
| =8 | MF | (Hong Kong) | 27 | Yeung Chi Lun | 0 | 0 | 0 | 1 | 1 |
| =8 | MF | (Hong Kong) | 38 | Kot Cho Wai | 1 | 0 | 0 | 0 | 1 |
| =8 | DF | (Hong Kong) | | Cheung Kin Fung | 0 | 1 | 0 | 0 | 1 |
| | | | | Own Goals | 2 | 0 | 0 | 0 | 2 |
| TOTALS | | | | | 26 | 1 | 0 | 12 | 39 |

=== Disciplinary record ===
As of 4 May 2013

| Number | Nationality | Position | Name | First Division League | | Senior Challenge Shield | | FA Cup | | AFC Cup | | Total | |
| Number | Nationality | Position | Name | Yellow card | Red card | Yellow card | Red card | Yellow card | Red card | Yellow card | Red card | Yellow card | Red card |
| 4 | (Hong Kong) | DF | Pak Wing Chak | 2 | 0 | 0 | 0 | 0 | 0 | 1 | 0 | 3 | 0 |
| 5 | (Hong Kong) | DF | Li Hang Wui | 2 | 0 | 0 | 0 | 0 | 0 | 2 | 0 | 4 | 0 |
| 6 | (Cameroon) | DF | Jean-Jacques Kilama | 3 | 1 | 1 | 0 | 1 | 0 | 3 | 0 | 8 | 1 |
| 9 | (Guinea) | FW | Mamadou Barry | 3 | 0 | 0 | 0 | 0 | 0 | 3 | 0 | 6 | 0 |
| 10 | (South Africa) | FW | Makhosonke Bhengu | 1 | 0 | 0 | 0 | 0 | 0 | 0 | 0 | 1 | 0 |
| 11 | (Hong Kong) | MF | Cheung Kwok Ming | 3 | 0 | 0 | 0 | 0 | 0 | 0 | 0 | 3 | 0 |
| 12 | (China) (Hong Kong) | GK | Zhang Chunhui | 3 | 1 | 0 | 0 | 0 | 0 | 0 | 0 | 3 | 1 |
| 13 | (China) | FW | Liang Zicheng | 2 | 0 | 0 | 0 | 0 | 0 | 1 | 0 | 3 | 0 |
| 14 | (Hong Kong) | MF | Chow Kwok Wai | 3 | 0 | 1 | 0 | 0 | 0 | 0 | 0 | 4 | 0 |
| 15 | (Hong Kong) | DF | Wong Chun Ho | 3 | 0 | 0 | 0 | 1 | 0 | 2 | 0 | 6 | 0 |
| 16 | (Brazil) (Hong Kong) | DF | Leung Ka Hai | 1 | 0 | 0 | 0 | 0 | 0 | 0 | 0 | 1 | 0 |
| 17 | (Hong Kong) | GK | Ho Kwok Chuen | 1 | 0 | 0 | 0 | 0 | 0 | 0 | 0 | 1 | 0 |
| 19 | (China) | MF | Su Yang | 3 | 0 | 0 | 0 | 0 | 0 | 0 | 0 | 3 | 0 |
| 23 | (Hong Kong) | DF | Cheung Chi Yung | 1 | 0 | 0 | 0 | 0 | 0 | 1 | 0 | 2 | 0 |
| 25 | (Spain) | MF | Jose Maria Diaz Munoz | 5 | 0 | 0 | 0 | 1 | 0 | 0 | 0 | 6 | 0 |
| 26 | (Hong Kong) | FW | Leung Tsz Chun | 4 | 0 | 0 | 0 | 0 | 0 | 0 | 0 | 4 | 0 |
| 27 | (Hong Kong) | MF | Yeung Chi Lun | 2 | 1 | 0 | 0 | 0 | 0 | 3 | 0 | 5 | 1 |
| 28 | (Brazil) | MF | Roberto | 3 | 0 | 1 | 0 | 0 | 0 | 0 | 0 | 4 | 0 |
| 30 | (Brazil) | DF | Leung Ka Hai | 1 | 0 | 1 | 0 | 0 | 0 | 0 | 0 | 2 | 0 |
| 38 | (Hong Kong) | MF | Kot Cho Wai | 1 | 0 | 0 | 0 | 0 | 0 | 1 | 0 | 2 | 0 |
| | (Hong Kong) | DF | Cheung Kin Fung | 2 | 0 | 1 | 0 | 0 | 0 | 0 | 0 | 3 | 0 |
| TOTALS | | | | 49 | 3 | 5 | 0 | 3 | 0 | 17 | 0 | 74 | 3 |

== Competitions ==
=== Overall ===
| Competition | Started round | Final position / round | First match | Last match |
|---|---|---|---|---|
| Hong Kong First Division League | — | 7th | 2 September 2012 | 4 May 2013 |
| Senior Challenge Shield | Quarter-finals | Quarter-finals | 17 November 2012 | 22 November 2012 |
| FA Cup | Quarter-finals | Quarter-finals | 17 February 2013 | 9 March 2013 |
| 2013 AFC Cup | Group stage | Group stage | 6 March 2013 | 1 May 2013 |

Updated to match played 4 May 2013
Source: Competitions

=== First Division League ===
==== Classification ====
| Pos | Team | Pld | W | D | L | GF | GA | GD | Pts |
|---|---|---|---|---|---|---|---|---|---|
| 5 | Sun Pegasus | 18 | 4 | 9 | 5 | 35 | 29 | +6 | 21 |
| 6 | Hong Kong Rangers | 18 | 5 | 5 | 8 | 32 | 52 | −20 | 20 (Note: HKR 3–3 CIT, HKR 2–2 SUN, HKR 1–1 YHK; CIT 2–3 HKR, CIT 1–2 SUN, CIT 3–0 YHK; SUN 2–2 HKR, SUN 1–1 CIT, SUN 1–1 YHK; YHK 2–4 HKR, YHK 1–1 CIT, YHK 2–0 SUN) |
| 7 | Sunray Cave JC Sun Hei | 18 | 4 | 8 | 6 | 26 | 33 | −7 | 20 |
| 8 | Citizen | 18 | 5 | 5 | 8 | 31 | 27 | +4 | 20 |
| 9 | Yokohama FC Hong Kong | 18 | 4 | 8 | 6 | 25 | 34 | −9 | 20 |

Updated to match(es) played on 26 May 2013. Source:
Rules for classification: 1) points; 2) head-to-head points; 3) head-to-head goal difference; 4) head-to-head goals scored; 5) goal difference; 6) number of goals scored.

==== Results summary ====
| Overall | | | | | | | | Home | | | | | | Away | | | | | |
| Pld | W | D | L | GF | GA | GD | Pts | W | D | L | GF | GA | GD | W | D | L | GF | GA | GD |
|---|---|---|---|---|---|---|---|---|---|---|---|---|---|---|---|---|---|---|---|
| 18 | 4 | 8 | 6 | 26 | 33 | −7 | 20 | 2 | 5 | 2 | 13 | 15 | −2 | 2 | 3 | 4 | 13 | 18 | −5 |

Last updated: 4 May 2013.

==== Results by round ====
| Round | 1 | 2 | 3 | 4 | 5 | 6 | 7 | 8 | 9 | 10 | 11 | 12 | 13 | 14 | 15 | 16 | 17 | 18 |
|---|---|---|---|---|---|---|---|---|---|---|---|---|---|---|---|---|---|---|
| Ground | H | H | A | H | H | A | A | A | H | A | A | H | H | H | A | A | H | A |
| Result | L | D | L | D | L | D | L | L | D | L | W | W | D | D | D | D | W | W |
| Position | 10 | 9 | 9 | 9 | 9 | 9 | 10 | 10 | 10 | 10 | 10 | 10 | 10 | 9 | 10 | 10 | 9 | 7 |

Updated to match(es) played on 4 May 2013. Source: hkfa.com
A = Away; H = Home; W = Win; D = Draw; L = Loss

== Matches ==
Win Draw Loss Void

=== Pre-season ===
| 9 August 2012 | Sunray Cave JC Sun Hei (Hong Kong) | 0 – 2 | (Hong Kong) Tuen Mun |
| 18:00 (GMT+8) |

=== Competitive ===
==== First Division League ====
| 2 September 2012 Week 1 | Sunray Cave JC Sun Hei | 0 – 3 | Kitchee | Mong Kok, Kowloon |
| 17:30 (GMT+8) | Makhosonke (yellow card) 22'; Roberto (yellow card) 71' | Report | 51', 88' Carril; 79' Chan Man Fai | Stadium: Mong Kok Stadium (Capatity:6,680); Attendance: 1,818; Referee: Ng Chiu Kok; Assistant referees: Chow Chun Kit, Chung Ming Sang; Fourth official: Ho Wai Sing |

| 9 September 2012 Week 2 | Sunray Cave JC Sun Hei | 2 – 2 | South China | Mong Kok, Kowloon |
| 17:30 (GMT+8) | Barry 15'; Diaz (yellow card) 29'; Leung Tsz Chun (yellow card) 32'; Cheung Kin Fung (yellow card) 37'; Cheung Kwok Ming 67'; Wong Chun Ho (yellow card) 83' | Report | 6' Lee Chi Ho; (yellow card) 23' Sealy; (yellow card) 41' Kwok Kin Pong; 58' Leandro; (yellow card) 90' Cheng Lai Hin; (yellow card) 90' Yapp Hung Fai | Stadium: Mong Kok Stadium (Capatity:6,680); Attendance: 3,333; Referee: Cheng Oi Cho; Assistant referees: Lam Chi Ho, Poon Ming Fai; Fourth official: Ho Wai Sing |

| 16 September 2012 Week 3 | Yokohama FC Hong Kong | 2 – 0 | Sunray Cave JC Sun Hei | Siu Sai Wan, Hong Kong Island |
| 17:30 (GMT+8) | Lam Ngai Tong (yellow card) 38'; Lau Cheuk Hin 67', 84'; Mirko (yellow card) 79' | Report | (yellow card) 45' Li Hang Wui; (yellow card) 78' Leung Tsz Chun | Stadium: Siu Sai Wan Sports Ground (Capatity:12,000); Attendance: 795; Referee: Wong Chi Tang, Charlton; Assistant referees: Cheng Oi Cho, Poon Ming Fai; Fourth official: Lam Chi Ho |

| 30 September 2012 Week 4 | Sunray Cave JC Sun Hei | 2 – 2 | Biu Chun Rangers | Mong Kok, Kowloon |
| 17:30 (GMT+8) | Zhang Chunhui (red card) 10'; Kilama (red card) 40'; Wong Chun Ho (yellow card) 67'; Ho Kwok Chuen (yellow card) 72'; Bamnjo 81' (o.g.); Barry 86' | Report | (yellow card) 9' Liu Songwei; 13' (pen.) Giovane; (yellow card) 63' Bemnjo; 76' Lam Hok Hei | Stadium: Mong Kok Stadium (Capatity:6,680); Attendance: 645; Referee: Chan Shui Hung; Assistant referees: Chow Chun Kit, Lam Shing Yan, Franky; Fourth official: Luk Kin Sun |

| 6 October 2012 Week 5 | Sunray Cave JC Sun Hei | 1 – 2 | Tuen Mun | Mong Kok, Kowloon |
| 17:30 (GMT+8) | Mauricio 22' (o.g.); Wong Chun Ho (yellow card) 37'; Li Hang Wui (yellow card) 51' | Report | (yellow card) 30' Chow Cheuk Fung; 32' Beto; 35' (yellow card) 81' Ling Cong | Stadium: Mong Kok Stadium (Capatity:6,680); Attendance: 751; Referee: Liu Kwok Man; Assistant referees: Chow Chun Kit, Poon Ming Fai; Fourth official: Ho Wai Sing |

| 21 October 2012 Week 6 | Wofoo Tai Po | 1 – 1 | Sunray Cave JC Sun Hei | Tai Po, New Territories |
| 14:30 (GMT+8) | Alex 34'; Wong Yim Kwan (yellow card) 51'; Lui Chi Hing (yellow card) 90' | Report | (yellow card) 12' Cheung Kwok Ming; (yellow card) 53' Roberto; 58' Barry; (yellow card) 88' Kilama | Stadium: Tai Po Sports Ground (Capatity:3,000); Attendance: 580; Referee: Liu Kwok Man; Assistant referees: Ng Kai Lam, Ho Wai Sing; Fourth official: Lo Yuk Ming Ricky |

| 3 November 2012 Week 7 | Sun Pegasus | 2 – 0 | Sunray Cave JC Sun Hei | Yuen Long, New Territories |
| 17:30 (GMT+8) | Thiago (yellow card) 26'; Juninho (yellow card) 70'; Mbome 75'; Tong Kin Man 79' | Report | (yellow card) 43' Cheung Kwok Ming | Stadium: Yuen Long Stadium (Capatity:4,932); Attendance: 529; Referee: Ng Kai Lam; Assistant referees: Ho Wai Sing, Chung Ming Sang; Fourth official: Yu Chun San |

| 10 November 2012 Week 8 | Southern | 2 – 1 | Sunray Cave JC Sun Hei | Aberdeen, Hong Kong Island |
| 14:30 (GMT+8) | Landon Ling 18' (yellow card) 47'; Ip Chung Long 70' | Report | (yellow card) 44' Barry; (yellow card) 64' Diaz; (yellow card) 82' Cheung Chi Yung; 88' Leung Tsz Chun; (yellow card) 90+1' Pak Wing Chak; (yellow card) 90+3' Cheung Kin Fung | Stadium: Aberdeen Sports Ground (Capatity:4,000^{1}); Attendance: 523; Referee: Chan Shui Hung; Assistant referees: Chow Chun Kit, Luk Kin Sun; Fourth official: Lam Shing Yan Franky |

| 20 December 2012 Week 9 | Sunray Cave JC Sun Hei | 1 – 1 | Citizen | Mong Kok, Kowloon |
| 20:00 (GMT+8) | Cheung Kwok Ming (yellow card) 66'; Barry 84' | Report | (yellow card) 58' (goal) 71' Hélio; (yellow card) 90+3' Festus | Stadium: Mong Kok Stadium (Capatity:6,680); Attendance: 318; Referee: Liu Kwok Man; Assistant referees: Chow Chun Kit, Lau Fong Hei; Fourth official: Luk Kin Sun |

| 19 January 2013 Week 10 | Tuen Mun | 4 – 2 | Sunray Cave JC Sun Hei | Tuen Mun, New Territories |
| 14:30 (GMT+8) | Beto 30' (pen.), 33'; Xie Silida (yellow card) 60'; Daniel 73' (yellow card) 83'; Li Haiqiang (yellow card) 75'; Chao Pengfei 84'; Mauricio (yellow card) 90' | Report | (yellow card) 28' Zhang Chunhui; (yellow card) 32' Pak Wing Chak; 49', 88' Diaz; (yellow card) 84' Leung Ka Hai | Stadium: Tuen Mun Tang Siu Kin Sports Ground (Capatity:2,200); Attendance: 665; Referee: Ho Wai Sing; Assistant referees: Chow Chun Kit, Yu Chun San; Fourth official: Luk Kin Sun |

| 3 February 2013 Week 11 | Citizen | 1 – 2 | Sunray Cave JC Sun Hei | Mong Kok, Kowloon |
| 17:30 (GMT+8) | Wong Yiu Fu (yellow card) 16'; Zhang Chunhui 37' (o.g.); Gustavo (yellow card) 51'; Sandro (yellow card) 79' | Report | 24' Diaz; 43' Roberto; (yellow card) 90+4' Chow Kwok Wai | Stadium: Mong Kok Stadium (Capatity:6,680); Attendance: 408; Referee: Ng Kai Lam; Assistant referees: Lam Chi Ho, Yau Tsz Yeung; Fourth official: Ho Wai Sing |

| 23 February 2013 Week 12 | Sunray Cave JC Sun Hei | 3 – 2 | Southern | Mong Kok, Kowloon |
| 17:30 (GMT+8) | Leung Tsz Chun 4' (pen.), 79' (pen.) (yellow card) 90+5'; Díaz (yellow card) 29'; Kilama (yellow card) 43'; Yeung Chi Lun (yellow card) 70'; Kot Cho Wai 75' (yellow card) 76'; Su Yang (yellow card) 90' | Report | (yellow card) 4' Chiu Yu Ming; (yellow card) 27' Dieguito; 45+1' (yellow card) 90+7' Rubén; 53' (yellow card) 65' Carril; (yellow card) 88' Ip Chung Long | Stadium: Mong Kok Stadium (Capatity:6,680); Attendance: 732; Referee: Ng Kai Lam; Assistant referees: Tong Kui Sum, Yu Chun San; Fourth official: Lui Siu Chuen |

| 18 March 2013 Week 14 | Sunray Cave JC Sun Hei | 0 – 0 | Sun Pegasus | Mong Kok, Kowloon |
| 20:00 (GMT+8) | Barry (yellow card) 21'; Zhang Chunhui (yellow card) 65' | Report | (yellow card) 64' Mbome; (yellow card) 86' Tong Kin Man | Stadium: Mong Kok Stadium (Capatity:6,680); Attendance: 506; Referee: Cheng Oi Cho; Assistant referees: Lam Chi Ho, Chan Ming Siu; Fourth official: Lui Siu Chuen |

| 24 March 2013 Week 13^{2} | Sunray Cave JC Sun Hei | 1 – 1 | Yokohama FC Hong Kong | Mong Kok, Kowloon |
| 14:30 (GMT+8) | Su Yang (yellow card) 20'; Roberto 62'; Liang Zicheng (yellow card) 76'; Zhang Chunhui (yellow card) 90' | Report | (yellow card) 4' Fong Pak Lun; 19' Lee Ka Yiu; (yellow card) 73' (yellow-red card) 81' Lee Ka Ho; (yellow card) 90' Leung Kwun Chung | Stadium: Mong Kok Stadium (Capatity:6,680); Attendance: 627; Referee: Cheng Oi Cho; Assistant referees: Lui Siu Chuen, Sarao Amarjit Singh; Fourth official: Lam Chi Ho |

| 29 March 2013^{3} Week 15 | Kitchee | 1 – 1 | Sunray Cave JC Sun Hei | Tseung Kwan O, New Territories |
| 17:30 (GMT+8) | Couñago 64' | Report | 32' Barry; (yellow card) 42' Leung Ka Hai | Stadium: Tseung Kwan O Sports Ground (Capatity:3,500); Attendance: 714; Referee: Tong Kui Sum; Assistant referees: Lam Shing Yan Franky, Lau Fong Hei; Fourth official: Chan Shui Hung |

| 14 April 2013 Week 16 | Biu Chun Rangers | 2 – 2 | Sunray Cave JC Sun Hei | Sham Shui Po, Kowloon |
| 14:30 (GMT+8) | Sashi (yellow card) 28'; Bamnjo 55'; Akosah 58' | Report | 24' Barry; 41' Leung Tsz Chun; (yellow card) 45+2' Diaz | Stadium: Sham Shui Po Sports Ground (Capatity:2,194); Attendance: 427; Referee: Liu Kwok Man; Assistant referees: Lui Siu Chuen, Fok Pong Shing; Fourth official: Lam Shing Yan Franky |

| 20 April 2013 Week 17 | Sunray Cave JC Sun Hei | 3 – 2 | Wofoo Tai Po | Mong Kok, Kowloon |
| 17:30 (GMT+8) | Liang Zicheng 15' (yellow card) 90+4'; Su Yang (yellow card) 24'; Choi Kwok Wai (yellow card) 50'; James Ha 72'; Leung Tsz Chun 90+1' (yellow card) 90+2'; Yeung Chi Lun (yellow card) 90+5'; Roberto (yellow card) 90+8' | Report | (yellow card) 41' Annan; 66' Alex; (yellow card) 78' Li Shu Yeung; 87' Caleb; (yellow card) 88' Clayton | Stadium: Mong Kok Stadium (Capatity:6,680); Attendance: 1,563; Referee: Ho Wai Sing; Assistant referees: Chow Chun Kit, Chung Ming Sang; Fourth official: Luk Kin Sun |

| 4 May 2013 Week 18 | South China | 3 – 4 | Sunray Cave JC Sun Hei | So Kon Po, Hong Kong Island |
| 15:30 (GMT+8) | Itaparica 8', 35'; Man Pei Tak (yellow card) 31' (yellow-red card) 79'; Dhiego 44'; Tse (yellow card) 45' (yellow-red card) 54'; Lee Chi Ho (yellow card) 90' | Report | (yellow card) 7' Diaz; (yellow card) 12' Kilima; 31' (pen.) Roberto; 43' (yellow card) 48' Choi Kwok Wai; (yellow card) 45+1' (goal) 89' Barry; (red card) 52' Yeung Chi Lun; 80' James Ha | Stadium: Hong Kong Stadium (Capatity:40,000); Attendance: 2,254; Referee: Ng Chiu Kok; Assistant referees: Lui Siu Chuen, Poon Ming Fai; Fourth official: Chan Ming Siu |

Remarks:
^{1} The capacity of Aberdeen Sports Ground is originally 9,000, but only the 4,000-seated main stand is opened for football match.
^{2} Home match against Yokohama FC Hong Kong was originally scheduled to be played on 2 March 2013 but was postponed and rescheduled to be played on 23 March 2013.
^{3} Away match against Kitchee was originally scheduled to be played on 31 March 2013 but was rescheduled to be played on 29 March 2013.

==== Senior Challenge Shield ====
===== Quarterfinals =====
| 17 November 2012 1st leg | Citizen | 1 – 0 | Sunray Cave JC Sun Hei | Tsing Yi, New Territories |
| 14:30(GMT+8) | Shum Kwok Fai 57'; Sham Kwok Keung (yellow card) 77'; Festus 84' | Report | (yellow card) 76' Chow Kwok Wai; (yellow card) 84' Cheung Kin Fung; (yellow card) 86' Roberto | Stadium: Tsing Yi Sports Ground (Capacity: 1,500); Attendance: 264; Referee: Ng Chiu Kok; Assistant referees: Ho Wai Sing, Yau Ho Fai; Fourth official: Yu Chun San |

| 22 November 2012 2nd leg | Sunray Cave JC Sun Hei | 1 – 1 (1 – 2 agg.) | Citizen | Mong Kok, Kowloon |
| 20:00(GMT+8) | Kilama (yellow card) 68'; Cheung Kin Fung 86'; Leung Ka Hai (yellow card) 90' | Report | 89' Paulinho | Stadium: Mong Kok Stadium (Capacity: 6,680); Attendance: 463; Referee: Tong Kui Sum; Assistant referees: Lam Chi Ho, Chung Ming Sang; Fourth official: Lam Nai Kei |

==== FA Cup ====
===== Quarter-finals =====
| 17 February 2013 1st leg | South China | 3 – 0 | Sunray Cave JC Sun Hei | So Kon Po, Hong Kong Island |
| 17:30(GMT+8) | Au Yeung Yiu Chung 73'; Chak Ting Fung (yellow card) 78'; Ticão 89'; Itaparica 90' | Report | (yellow card) 35' Díaz; (yellow card) 48' Kilama | Stadium: Hong Kong Stadium (Capacity: 40,000); Attendance: 1,329; Referee: Cheng Oi Cho; Assistant referees: Lam Chi Ho, Poon Ming Fai; Fourth official: Luk Kin Sun |

| 9 March 2013 2nd leg | Sunray Cave JC Sun Hei | 0 – 3 (0 – 6 agg.) | South China | Mong Kok, Kowloon |
| 17:30(GMT+8) | Wong Chun Ho (yellow card) 8' | Report | 5' Tse; 85' Lee Hong Lim; 90+1' Cheng Lai Hin | Stadium: Mong Kok Stadium (Capacity: 6,680); Attendance: 1,406; Referee: Tong Kui Sum; Assistant referees: Cheng Oi Cho, Lam Chi Ho; Fourth official: Tang Hing Fu |

==== AFC Cup ====
===== Group stage =====
| Team | Pld | W | D | L | GF | GA | GD | Pts | NRA | YAN | SH | PSB |
|---|---|---|---|---|---|---|---|---|---|---|---|---|
| (Maldives) New Radiant | 6 | 5 | 0 | 1 | 20 | 4 | +16 | 15 | | 3–1 | 1–0 | 6–1 |
| (Myanmar) Yangon United | 6 | 5 | 0 | 1 | 18 | 5 | +13 | 15 | 2–0 | | 2–0 | 3–0 |
| (Hong Kong) Sunray Cave JC Sun Hei | 6 | 1 | 1 | 4 | 12 | 12 | 0 | 4 | 0–3 | 1–3 | | 8–0 |
| (Indonesia) Persibo Bojonegoro | 6 | 0 | 1 | 5 | 5 | 34 | −29 | 1 | 0–7 | 1–7 | 3–3 | |

Legend: Blue = home team win; Yellow = draw; Red = away team win.

| 5 March 2013 Matchday 1 | New Radiant (Maldives) | 1 – 0 | (Hong Kong) Sunray Cave JC Sun Hei | Malé, Maldives |
| 16:00 (GMT+5) | Riley (yellow card) 34'; Umarey 67' | Report (AFC) | (yellow card) 26' Kilama; (yellow card) 52' Yeung Chi Lun | Stadium: Rasmee Dhandu Stadium (Capacity: 11,850); Attendance: 4,880; Referee: Vo Minh Tri (Vietnam); Assistant referees: Thanom Borikut (Thailand), Teerajit Sittisook (Thailand); Fourth official: Prathan Nasawang (Thailand) |

| 12 March 2013 Matchday 2 | Sunray Cave JC Sun Hei (Hong Kong) | 1 – 3 | (Myanmar) Yangon United | Mong Kok, Hong Kong |
| 20:00 (GMT+8) | Yeung Chi Lun 20' (yellow card) 42'; Kilama (yellow card) 73' | Report (AFC); Report (HKFA) | 2' Kone; (yellow card) 4' Pyae Phyo Aung; (yellow card) 34' Yan Aung Kyaw; 53' César; 90+7' Aung Moe | Stadium: Mong Kok Stadium (Capacity: 6,680); Attendance: 736; Referee: Pratap Singh (India); Assistant referees: Magho Singa (India), Kamil Tumin (Malaysia); Fourth official: Suhaizi Shukri (Malaysia) |

| 3 April 2013 Matchday 3 | Persibo Bojonegoro (Indonesia) | 3 – 3 | (Hong Kong) Sunray Cave JC Sun Hei | Surakarta, Indonesia |
| 15:00 (GMT+7) | James Ha 11' (o.g.); Alcorsé 33', 68'; Tamsil (yellow card) 45+2' (yellow-red card) 87'; Cirelli (yellow card) 82' | Report (AFC) | (yellow card) 24' Wong Chun Ho; (yellow card) 26' Cheung Chi Yung; 58' Leung Tsz Chun; 70' Chow Kwok Wai; (yellow card) 76' Li Hang Wui; (yellow card) 86' Kot Cho Wai; 90+3' Roberto | Stadium: Manahan Stadium (Capacity: 25,000); Attendance: 400; Referee: Nagor Amir Noor Mohamed (Malaysia); Assistant referees: Mohammed Hanif bin Abdul Rahman (Malaysia), Mohd Kamil bin Tumin (Malaysia); Fourth official: Tayeb Shamsuzzaman (Bangladesh) |

| 9 April 2013 Matchday 4 | Sunray Cave JC Sun Hei (Hong Kong) | 8 – 0 (Abandoned^{1}) | (Indonesia) Persibo Bojonegoro | Mong Kok, Hong Kong |
| 20:00 (GMT+8) | Barry 3', 12', 39' (yellow card) 24'; Liang Zicheng 6', 48' (yellow card) 50'; Roberto 16'; Leung Tsz Chun 31', 37'; Wong Chun Ho (yellow card) 32' | Report (AFC); Report (HKFA) | (yellow card) 29' Saputra; (yellow card) 31' Praidi; (yellow card) 47' Iswanto | Stadium: Mong Kok Stadium (Capacity: 6,680); Attendance: 463; Referee: Chaiya Mahapab (Thailand); Assistant referees: Naser Alshatti (Kuwait), Humoud Alsahli (Kuwait); Fourth official: Thong Chanketya (Cambodia) |

| 24 April 2013 Matchday 5 | Sunray Cave JC Sun Hei (Hong Kong) | 0 – 3 | (Maldives) New Radiant | Mong Kok, Hong Kong |
| 20:00 (GMT+8) | Li Hang Wui (yellow card) 79'; Yeung Chi Lun (yellow card) 82'; Barry (yellow card) 89' | Report (AFC); Report(HKFA) | (yellow card) 5' Waheed; 61', 71' Fasir; 86' Umair; (yellow card) 89' Nkurumeh | Stadium: Mong Kok Stadium (Capacity: 6,680); Attendance: 477; Referee: Yudai Yamamoto (Japan); Assistant referees: Shinji Ochi (Japan), Seo Moo-Heen (Korea Republic); Fourth official: Prathan Nasawang (Thailand) |

| 1 May 2013 Matchday 6 | Yangon United (Myanmar) | 2 – 0 | (Hong Kong) Sunray Cave JC Sun Hei | Yangon, Myanmar |
| 15:30 (GMT+6:30) | Yan Aung Kyaw (yellow card) 24'; Jean-Patrice (yellow card) 45+2'; Kyi Lin 69'; Aung Thaik (yellow card) 79'; Koné 81' | Report (AFC) | (yellow card) 29' Kilama; (yellow card) 39' Pak Wing Chak; (yellow card) 84' Barry | Stadium: Thuwunna Stadium (Capacity: 32,000); Attendance: 700; Referee: Mohd Amirul Izwan bin Yaacob (Malaysia); Assistant referees: Mohd Sabri bin Mat Daud (Malaysia), Mohd Yusri bin Muhamad (Malaysia); Fourth official: Suhaizi Shukri (Malaysia) |

Remarks:
^{1}The match was abandoned after 65 minutes of play as Persibo Bojonegoro failed to reach the required limit of players on pitch. Sunray Cave JC Sun Hei were leading 8–0. The result was declared final by AFC.
