= 2011–12 Hong Kong FA Cup =

2011-12 Hong Kong FA Cup
Tournament details
- Country: Hong Kong
- Teams: 10

Final positions
- Champions: Kitchee (1st title)
- Runners-up: TSW Pegasus

Tournament statistics
- Matches played: 9
- Goals scored: 34 (3.78 per match)
- Attendance: 14,890 (1,654 per match)
- Top goal scorer(s): (Brazil) Leandro Carrijo (TSW Pegasus); 3 goals

The 2011–12 Hong Kong FA Cup was the 38th season of Hong Kong FA Cup. It is a knockout competition for all the teams of the 2011–12 Hong Kong First Division League.

Originally, Brain Leung, chairman of Hong Kong Football Association, announced the winner of the FA Cup would be qualified to 2012 Chinese FA Cup after both the invitation of Chinese Football Association and the voting result of board meeting. However, the calendar of Chinese FA Cup had been announced before the board meeting and therefore the plan was abolished.

Kitchee clinch their first Hong Kong FA Cup title and completed The Treble.

== Calendar ==
Round	Draw Date	Date	Matches	Clubs
First Round	19 March 2012	25 March 2012	2	10 → 8
Quarter-finals	19 March 2012	28–29 April 2012	4	8 → 4
Semi-finals	19 March 2012	12–13 May 2012	2	4 → 2
Final	19 March 2012	27 May 2012 at Hong Kong Stadium	1	2 → 1

== Draw ==
Seed	Non-seed
South China Sunray Cave JC Sun Hei; TSW Pegasus; Wofoo Tai Po	Biu Chun Rangers Citizen; Hong Kong Sapling; Kitchee; Sham Shui Po; Tuen Mun

== Bracket ==
First Round
Hong Kong Sapling (p)	3 (5)
Tuen Mun	3 (4)
Kitchee	1
Citizen	0

Quarterfinals
Wofoo Tai Po	1
Sham Shui Po (a.e.t.)	2
TSW Pegasus	5
Hong Kong Sapling	1
Sunray Cave JC Sun Hei	0
Biu Chun Rangers	2
South China	2
Kitchee	3

Semifinals
Sham Shui Po	1
TSW Pegasus	3
Biu Chun Rangers	0
Kitchee	1

Final
TSW Pegasus	3 (3)
Kitchee (p)	3 (5)

== Match Records ==
=== First round ===
25 March 2012 Round 1	Hong Kong Sapling	3 – 3 (a.e.t.) (5 – 4 p)	Tuen Mun	Mong Kok
14:30 (GMT+8)	Alex (yellow card) 15'; Alex 34', 59'; Ramos 57' (pen.); Cheung Kwok Ming (yellow card) 90'; Kot Cho Wai (yellow card) 116'	Report	4', 82' Makhosonke; (yellow card) 21' Chow Cheuk Fung; (yellow card) 45' Milutin; (yellow card) 55' (yellow-red card) 118' Bamnjo; (yellow card) 78' Vekic; (yellow card) 88' Makhosonke; 90' Ling Cong; (yellow card) 90' Law Ka Lok	Stadium: Mong Kok Stadium (Capacity:6,680); Attendance: 1,354; Referee: Pau Sai Yin; Assistant referees: Chan Shui Hung; Lui Siu Chuen; Fourth official: Ho Wai Sing
	Penalties
	Cheung Kwok Ming (penalty scored); Tsang Kin Fong (penalty scored); Kot Cho Wai (penalty scored); Ramos (penalty scored); Chan Cham Hei (penalty scored)		(penalty missed) Milutin; (penalty scored) Beto; (penalty scored) Vekic; (penalty scored) Mirko; (penalty scored) Yip Tsz Chun

25 March 2012 Round 1	Kitchee	1 – 0	Citizen	Mong Kok
17:00 (GMT+8)	Chan Man Fai 20'; Chan Man Fai (yellow card) 81'; Dani (yellow card) 83'	Report	(yellow card) 16' Wong Yiu Fu; (yellow card) 77' Chiu Chun Kit	Stadium: Mong Kok Stadium (Capacity:6,680); Attendance: 1,354; Referee: Pau Sai Yin; Assistant referees: Chan Shui Hung; Lui Siu Chuen; Fourth official: Ho Wai Sing

=== Quarter-finals ===
28 April 2012 Quarter-Final	TSW Pegasus	5 – 1	Hong Kong Sapling	Mong Kok
14:30 (GMT+8)	Itaparica 11', 90'; Carrijo 30', 89'; Godfred 50'; Cheung Kin Fung (yellow card) 76'	Report	(yellow card) 36' (yellow-red card) 67' Yuen Tsun Nam; 52' Cheung Kwok Ming; (yellow card) 55' Chuck Yiu Kwok; (yellow card) 69' Chan Cham Hei	Stadium: Mong Kok Stadium (Capacity:6,680); Attendance: 992; Referee: Liu Kwok Man; Assistant referees: Ng Kai Lam; Lam Nai Kei; Fourth official: Lui Siu Chuen

28 April 2012 Quarter-Final	Wofoo Tai Po	1 – 2 (a.e.t.)	Sham Shui Po	Mong Kok
17:00 (GMT+8)	To Hon To 21'; Clayton (yellow card) 79'; Lui Chi Hing (yellow card) 90'		20' Lau Cheuk Hin; (yellow card) 70' Chan Siu Kwan; (yellow card) 79' Naves; 105' Evans	Stadium: Mong Kok Stadium (Capacity:6,680); Attendance: 992; Referee: Pau Sai Yin; Assistant referees: Tong Kui Sum; Franky Lam Shing Yan; Fourth official: Cheng Oi Cho

29 April 2012 Quarter-Final	Sunray Cave JC Sun Hei	0 – 2	Biu Chun Rangers	So Kon Po
14:30 (GMT+8)	Pak Wing Chak (yellow card) 34'; Cordeiro (red card) 80'; Hou Yu (yellow card) 81'; Cheng Siu Wai (yellow card) 87'	Report	(yellow card) 34' Tong Kin Man; 78' Lam Hok Hei; 90' Li Jian	Stadium: Hong Kong Stadium (Capacity:40,000); Attendance: 3,111; Referee: Charlton Wong Chi Tang; Assistant referees: Lui Siu Chuen; Chung Ming Sang; Fourth official: Ho Wai Sing

29 April 2012 Quarter-Final	South China	2 – 3	Kitchee	So Kon Po
17:00 (GMT+8)	Giovane 42'; Lee Chi Ho (yellow card) 63'; Joel 90'; Joel (yellow card) 90'	Report	10' Chan Man Fai; 45' Yago; 84' Roberto; (yellow card) 90' Chu Siu Kei	Stadium: Hong Kong Stadium (Capacity:40,000); Attendance: 3,111; Referee: Cheng Oi Cho; Assistant referees: Ng Chiu Kok; Poon Ming Fai; Fourth official: Yu Chun San

=== Semi-finals ===
12 May 2012 Semi-Final	Sham Shui Po	1 – 3	TSW Pegasus	Mong Kok
16:00 (GMT+8)	Lo Kong Wai 44'; Leung Kwun Chung (yellow card) 52'; Fong Pak Lun (yellow card) 55'	Report	2' Carrijo; (yellow card) 50' Lau Nim Yat; 59' Cheung Kin Fung; 75' Mckee	Stadium: Mong Kok Stadium (Capacity:6,680); Attendance: 727; Referee: Charlton Wong Chi Tang; Assistant referees: Cheng Oi Cho; Lui Siu Chuen; Fourth official: Franky Lam Shing Yan

13 May 2012 Semi-Final	Biu Chun Rangers	0 – 1	Kitchee	Mong Kok
16:00 (GMT+8)	Chan Siu Yuen (yellow card) 72'; Liu Songwei (yellow card) 90'	Report	6' Huang Yang; (yellow card) 69' Tsang Kam To	Stadium: Mong Kok Stadium (Capacity:6,680); Attendance: 1,259; Referee: Liu Kwok Man; Assistant referees: Chan Shui Hung; Poon Ming Fai; Fourth official: Lam Nai Kei

=== Final ===
26 May 2012 Final	TSW Pegasus	3 – 3 (a.e.t.) (3 – 5 p)	Kitchee	So Kon Po
16:00 (GMT+8)	Carrijó 67', 99'; McKee 109'	Report	32' Liang Zicheng; 110' Lo Kwan Yee; 120' Roberto	Stadium: Hong Kong Stadium (Capacity:40,000); Attendance: 1,990; Referee: Ng Chiu Kok
	Penalties
	Itaparica (penalty scored); Lee Hong Lim (penalty missed); Carrijó (penalty scored); Godfred (penalty scored)		(penalty scored) Roberto; (penalty scored) Chan Man Fai; (penalty scored) Rehman; (penalty scored) Diaz; (penalty scored) Lo Kwan Yee

TSW Pegasus	Kitchee

TSW Pegasus:
GK	27	(Japan) Hisanori Takada
RB	2	(Hong Kong) Lee Wai Lun
CB	35	(Hong Kong) Ng Wai Chiu
CB	3	(Brazil) Lucas	(yellow card) 7'
LB	31	(Hong Kong) Poon Yiu Cheuk		(substituted off) 59'
DM	10	(Cameroon) Eugene Mbome
DM	14	(Hong Kong) Chan Ming Kong		(substituted off) 59'
RM	16	(Hong Kong) Lau Nim Yat	(yellow card) 88' (yellow-red card) 120'
AM	11	(Brazil) Itaparica (c)	(yellow card) 90'
LM	13	(Hong Kong) Cheung Kin Fung		(substituted off) 84'
CF	20	(Hong Kong) Godfred Karikari	(yellow card) 119'
Substitutes:
GK	30	(Hong Kong) Tsang Man Fai
MF	17	(Hong Kong) Lee Hong Lim	(yellow card) 93'	(substituted on) 59'
MF	21	(Hong Kong) Li Ka Chun
MF	26	(Hong Kong) Lai Yiu Cheong
FW	9	(Hong Kong) Lau Ka Shing
FW	23	(Hong Kong) Jaimes McKee		(substituted on) 84'
FW	28	(Brazil) Leandro Carrijó		(substituted on) 59'
Coach：
(Hong Kong) Chan Hiu Ming

KITCHEE:
GK	23	(China) Guo Jianqiao
RB	12	(Hong Kong) Lo Kwan Yee
CB	5	(Pakistan) Zesh Rehman
CB	2	(Spain) Fernando Recio	(yellow card) 116' (yellow-red card) 119'
LB	3	(Spain) Dani Cancela
DM	16	(Spain) Diaz	(yellow card) 120'
CM	19	(Hong Kong) Huang Yang
CM	10	(Hong Kong) Lam Ka Wai		(substituted off) 69'
RW	7	(Hong Kong) Chu Siu Kei (c)
CF	11	(Spain) Yago González		(substituted off) 42'
LW	9	(Hong Kong) Liang Zicheng		(substituted off) 81'
Substitutes:
GK	1	(Hong Kong) Wang Zhenpeng
DF	21	(Hong Kong) Tsang Kam To		(substituted on) 69'
DF	24	(Canada) Landon Ling
MF	13	(Hong Kong) Chan Man Fai	(yellow card) 114'	(substituted on) 81'
FW	18	(Spain) Jordi Tarrés
FW	20	(Spain) Roberto Losada	(yellow card) 57'	(substituted on) 42'
FW	26	(Hong Kong) Chao Pengfei
Coach:
(Spain) Josep Gombau

MATCH OFFICIALS

- Assistant referees:
  - Chan Shui Hung
  - Ho Wai Sing
- Fourth official: Charlton Wong Chi Tang

MATCH RULES

- 90 minutes.
- 30 minutes of extra-time if necessary.
- Penalty shoot-out if scores still level.
- Seven named substitutes
- Maximum of 3 substitutions.

== Scorers ==
The scorers in the 2011–12 Hong Kong FA Cup are as follows:

5 goals

- (Brazil) Leandro Carrijo (TSW Pegasus)

2 goals

- (Nigeria) Alex Tayo Akande (Hong Kong Sapling)
- (South Africa) Makhosonke Bhengu (Tuen Mun)
- (Brazil) Itaparica (TSW Pegasus)
- (Hong Kong) Jaimes Mckee (TSW Pegasus)
- (Hong Kong) Chan Man Fai (Kitchee)
- (Spain) Roberto Losada (Kitchee)

1 goal

- (China) Ling Cong (Tuen Mun)
- (Hong Kong) Godfred Karikari (TSW Pegasus)
- (Hong Kong) Cheung Kin Fung (TSW Pegasus)
- (Hong Kong) Lau Cheuk Hin (Sham Shui Po)
- (Hong Kong) Lo Kong Wai (Sham Shui Po)
- (Australia) Dean Evans (Sham Shui Po)
- (Hong Kong) Huang Yang (Kitchee)
- (Hong Kong) Lo Kwan Yee (Kitchee)
- (Hong Kong) Liang Zicheng (Kitchee)
- (Spain) Yago Gonzalez (Kitchee)
- (Spain) Andreu Ramos Isus (Hong Kong Sapling)
- Cheung Kwok Ming (Hong Kong Sapling)
- (Brazil) Giovane (South China)
- (Brazil) Joel (South China)
- (Hong Kong) Lam Hok Hei (Biu Chun Rangers)
- (China) Li Jian (Biu Chun Rangers)
- (Hong Kong) To Hon To (Wofoo Tai Po)
