= 2012–13 Hong Kong Rangers FC season =

Biu Chun Rangers
2012–13 season
- President: Mok Yiu Keung
- Head Coach: Chan Hung Ping
- Home ground: Sham Shui Po Sports Ground
- First Division: 6th
- Senior Shield: First round
- FA Cup: Quarter-finals
- Top goalscorer: League: Giovane Silva (11); All: Giovane Silva (11)
- Highest home attendance: 2,643 (23 December vs Kitchee, First Division)
- Lowest home attendance: 399 (17 March vs Yokohama FC Hong Kong, First Division)
- Average home league attendance: 825 (In all competitions)
Home colours	Away colours

Biu Chun Rangers, previously known as Rangers, will seek to win at least a trophy in this season. They are competing in the First Division League, Senior Challenge Shield and FA Cup this season.

== Key events ==
- 28 September 2012: Cameroonian midfielder Wilfred Bamnjo joins the club for free after being released by Tuen Mun this summer.
- 4 November 2012: Head coach Goran Paulic was demoted to the youth team as youth team coach. Chan Hung Ping is named as their new head coach.
- 10 January 2013: Biu Chun Rangers made a player exchange deal with South China. Wong Chin Hung joins Biu Chun Rangers from South China while Chak Ting Fung is transferred to South China. Both transfers are free transfers.
- 23 January 2013: Brazilian defender Juninho joins the club from Sun Pegasus for an undisclosed fee.
- 24 January 2013: Brazilian defender Luciano Silva da Silva joins the club from Vietnamese First Division side An Giang.
- 31 January 2013: Hong Kong midfielder Yeung Chi Lun lefts the club and joins Sunray Cave JC Sun Hei for an undisclosed fee.

== Players ==
As of 30 January 2013.

Note: Flags indicate national team as defined under FIFA eligibility rules; some limited exceptions apply. Players may hold more than one non-FIFA nationality.

No.	Pos.	Nation	Player
1	GK	(Hong Kong) HKG	Leung Hing Kit (Vice-captain)
2	DF	(Hong Kong) HKG	Lai Hau Hei
3	DF	(Hong Kong) HKG	Wong Chin Hung (Captain)
4	DF	(Zambia) ZAM	Sashi Chalwe^{FP}
5	MF	(Cameroon) CMR	Wilfred Bamnjo
6	DF	(Hong Kong) HKG	Lau Nim Yat
7	MF	(Hong Kong) HKG	Cheng King Ho
8	MF	(Croatia) CRO	Miroslav Saric^{FP}
10	FW	(Hong Kong) HKG	Lam Hok Hei
11	DF	(Hong Kong) HKG	Shum Wai Shing
12	MF	(Hong Kong) HKG	Li Ka Chun

No.	Pos.	Nation	Player
14	DF	(Hong Kong) HKG	Chan Siu Yuen
17	GK	(Hong Kong) HKG	Wong Tsz Him
18	DF	(Brazil) BRA	Luciano Silva da Silva^{FP}
19	MF	(Hong Kong) HKG	Law Hiu Chung
20	MF	(Hong Kong) HKG	Wong Philip
21	FW	(Hong Kong) HKG	Julius Akosah
22	FW	(Brazil) BRA	Giovane^{FP}
23	DF	(Hong Kong) HKG	Liu Songwei
24	MF	(Hong Kong) HKG	Yuen Kin Man
25	DF	(Brazil) BRA	Juninho^{FP}
27	GK	(Hong Kong) HKG	Chan Chi Kit

Remarks:
^{FP} These players are registered as foreign players.

Players with dual nationality:

- (Cameroon) (Hong Kong) Wilfred Bamnjo (Local player)
- (Germany) Andy Nägelein (Local player, eligible to play for Hong Kong national football team)
- (China) Liu Songwei (Local player, eligible to play for Hong Kong national football team)

=== Transfers ===
==== In ====
#	Position	Player	Transferred from	Fee	Date	Team	Source
17	GK	(Hong Kong) Wong Tsz Him	(Hong Kong) Kitchee	Undisclosed	6 July 2012	First team	
3	DF	(Croatia) Hrvoje Komar	(Croatia) NK Šparta Elektra	Undisclosed		First team	
5	MF	(Cameroon) Wilfred Bamnjo	(Hong Kong) Tuen Mun	Free transfer		First team	
18	DF	(Brazil) Luciano Silva da Silva	(Vietnam) An Giang		24 January 2013	First team	
25	DF	(Brazil) Juninho	Sun Pegasus		23 January 2013	First team	

== Stats ==
=== Squad Stats ===
				Total				Hong Kong First Division League		Senior Challenge Shield		FA Cup		
N	Pos.	Name	Nat.	GS	App	Gls	Min	App	Gls	App	Gls	App	Gls	Notes
1	GK	Leung Hing Kit	(Hong Kong)	18	18	-44	1563	15	-37	1	-5	2	-2	(−) GA
17	GK	Wong Tsz Him	(Hong Kong)	3	4	-13	335	3	-9	1	-4			(−) GA
27	GK	Chan Chi Kit	(Hong Kong)											(−) GA
2	DF	Lai Hau Hei	(Hong Kong)	1	4		127	3		1				
3	DF	Wong Chin Hung	(Hong Kong)	10	10		900	8				2		joined in January 2013
4	DF	Sashi Chalwe	(Zambia)	5	10		542	9				1		joined in October 2012
6	DF	Lau Nim Yat	(Hong Kong)	17	18		1536	15		2		1		
11	DF	Shum Wai Shing	(Hong Kong)	1	1		59			1				
14	DF	Chan Siu Yuen	(Hong Kong)	18	19		1419	15		2		2		
18	DF	Luciano	(Brazil)	9	9	1	781	7	1			2		
23	DF	Liu Songwei	(Hong Kong)	20	20	1	1754	17	1	1		2		
25	DF	Juninho	(Brazil)	8	9		674	6		1		2		joined in January 2013
26	DF	Sasa Kolic	(Croatia)	1	1		83	1						left in January 2013
	DF	Hrvoje Komar	(Croatia)	7	7	2	534	5	1	2	1			left in November 2012
	DF	Chak Ting Fung	(Hong Kong)	9	9		810	8		1				left in January 2013
5	MF	Wilfred Bamnjo	(Cameroon)	14	14	2	1136	11	2	1		2		joined in September 2012
7	MF	Cheng King Ho	(Hong Kong)	11	21	1	981	17	1	2		2		
8	MF	Miroslav Saric	(Croatia)	19	19	6	1641	16	5	1		2	1	
12	MF	Li Ka Chun	(Hong Kong)	2	10		296	8		2				
18	MF	Andy Nägelein	(Germany)	2	2		180	2						
19	MF	Law Hiu Chung	(Hong Kong)	3	11		425	9		2				
20	MF	Wong Philip	(Hong Kong)		1		12			1				
24	MF	Yuen Kin Man	(Hong Kong)		2		15	2						joined in October 2012
	MF	Yeung Chi Lun	(Hong Kong)	4	9	1	465	7	1	2				left in January 2013
10	FW	Lam Hok Hei	(Hong Kong)	18	19	5	1587	16	5	1		2		
21	FW	Julius Akosah	(Hong Kong)	10	15	3	871	12	3	2		1		joined in September 2012
22	FW	Giovane Alves da Silva	(Brazil)	18	18	11	1589	15	11	1		2		
	FW	Li Jian	(China)	2	3		122	3						left in September 2012
	FW	S'Celo Zuma	(South Africa)	2	2		147	1		1				joined in October 2012, left in January 2013

Last updated: 4 May 2013
Ordered by Position
0 shown as blank

=== Top scorers ===
As of 4 May 2013

Place	Position	Nationality	Number	Name	First Division League	Senior Challenge Shield	FA Cup	Total
1	FW	(Brazil)	22	Giovane Alves da Silva	11	0	0	11
=2	MF	(Croatia)	8	Miroslav Saric	5	0	1	6
=2	FW	(Hong Kong)	10	Lam Hok Hei	6	0	0	6
4	FW	(Hong Kong)	21	Julius Akosah	3	0	0	3
=5	MF	(Cameroon)	5	Wilfred Bamnjo	2	0	0	2
=5	DF	(Croatia)		Hrvoje Komar	1	1	0	2
=7	MF	(Hong Kong)	7	Cheng King Ho	1	0	0	1
=7	MF	(Hong Kong)	13	Yeung Chi Lun	1	0	0	1
=7	DF	(Brazil)	18	Luciano Silva da Silva	1	0	0	1
=7	DF	(Hong Kong)	23	Liu Songwei	1	0	0	1
TOTALS					32	1	1	34

=== Disciplinary record ===
As of 21 April 2013

Number	Nationality	Position	Name	First Division League		Senior Challenge Shield		FA Cup		Total	
Number	Nationality	Position	Name	Booked	Sent off (straight red)	Booked	Sent off (straight red)	Booked	Sent off (straight red)	Booked	Sent off (straight red)
1	(Hong Kong)	GK	Leung Hing Kit	1	1	0	0	0	0	1	1
4	(Zambia)	DF	Sashi Chalwe	2	0	0	0	0	0	2	0
5	(Cameroon) (Hong Kong)	MF	Wilfred Bamnjo	2	2	0	0	2	0	4	2
6	(Hong Kong)	DF	Lau Nim Yat	2	0	0	0	0	0	2	0
8	(Croatia)	MF	Miroslav Saric	3	0	1	0	0	0	4	0
10	(Hong Kong)	FW	Lam Hok Hei	2	0	0	0	0	0	2	0
13	(Hong Kong)	MF	Yeung Chi Lun	2	0	0	0	0	0	2	0
14	(Hong Kong)	DF	Chan Siu Yuen	2	0	0	0	0	0	2	0
16	(Hong Kong)	DF	Chak Ting Fung	2	0	0	0	0	0	2	0
18	(Brazil)	DF	Luciano Silva da Silva	0	0	0	0	1	0	1	0
21	(Hong Kong) (Cameroon)	FW	Julius Akosah	4	0	0	0	0	0	4	0
23	(Hong Kong) (China)	DF	Liu Songwei	3	1	0	0	0	0	3	1
25	(Brazil)	DF	Juninho	1	0	0	0	0	0	1	0
	(Croatia)	DF	Hrvoje Komar	1	0	0	0	0	0	1	0
TOTALS				27	4	1	0	3	0	31	4

== Competitions ==
=== Overall ===
Competition	Started round	Final position / round	First match	Last match
Hong Kong First Division League	—	6th	1 September 2012	4 May 2013
Senior Challenge Shield	1st round	1st round	22 September 2012	10 October 2012
FA Cup	Quarter-finals	Quarter-finals	16 February 2013	9 March 2013

Updated to match played 4 May 2013
Source: Competitions

=== First Division League ===
==== Classification ====
Pos	Team	Pld	W	D	L	GF	GA	GD	Pts	Qualification or relegation
4	Southern	18	6	6	6	24	27	−3	24	2012–13 Hong Kong Season play-off (Note: Southern qualified for the play-offs as Kitchee defeated Sun Pegasus in the FA Cup while they have guaranteed a place for the play-offs, meaning the league 4th place qualifies.)
5	Sun Pegasus	18	4	9	5	35	29	+6	21	
6	Hong Kong Rangers	18	5	5	8	32	52	−20	20 (Note: HKR 3–3 CIT, HKR 2–2 SUN, HKR 1–1 YHK; CIT 2–3 HKR, CIT 1–2 SUN, CIT 3–0 YHK; SUN 2–2 HKR, SUN 1–1 CIT, SUN 1–1 YHK; YHK 2–4 HKR, YHK 1–1 CIT, YHK 2–0 SUN)	
7	Sunray Cave JC Sun Hei	18	4	8	6	26	33	−7	20	
8	Citizen	18	5	5	8	31	27	+4	20	

Updated to match(es) played on 26 May 2013. Source:
Rules for classification: 1) points; 2) head-to-head points; 3) head-to-head goal difference; 4) head-to-head goals scored; 5) goal difference; 6) number of goals scored.

==== Results summary ====
Overall								Home						Away					
Pld	W	D	L	GF	GA	GD	Pts	W	D	L	GF	GA	GD	W	D	L	GF	GA	GD
18	5	5	8	32	52	−20	20	1	3	5	16	33	−17	4	2	3	16	19	−3

Last updated: 4 May 2013.

==== Results by round ====
Round	1	2	3	4	5	6	7	8	9	10	11	12	13	14	15	16	17	18
Ground	H	A	H	A	A	A	A	H	H	H	A	A	A	H	A	H	H	H
Result	W	W	L	D	W	L	W	L	L	D	L	W	D	D	L	D	L	L
Position	3	2	4	4	3	4	3	3	4	4	4	4	4	4	5	5	5	6

Updated to match(es) played on 4 May 2013. Source: hkfa.com
A = Away; H = Home; W = Win; D = Draw; L = Loss

== Matches ==
=== Competitive ===
==== First Division League ====
1 September 2012 Week 1	Biu Chun Rangers	3 – 1	Southern	Sham Shui Po, Kowloon
14:30 (GMT+8)	Komar 22'; Chak Ting Fung (yellow card) 38'; Giovane 44' (pen.); Saric 90+4'	Report	1' Diego Folgar; (yellow card) 44' Tsang Chiu Tat	Stadium: Sham Shui Po Sports Ground (Capatity:2,194); Attendance: 595; Referee: Wong Chi Tang, Charlton; Assistant referees: Poon Ming Fai, Lam Shing Yan; Fourth official: Ng Kai Lam

8 September 2012 Week 2	Sun Pegasus	1 – 2	Biu Chun Rangers	Yuen Long, New Territories
17:30 (GMT+8)	McKee 45+1'; Deng Jinghuang (yellow card) 50'	Report	21', 30' Saric	Stadium: Yuen Long Stadium (Capatity:4,932); Attendance: 549; Referee: Tong Kui Sum; Assistant referees: Ho Wai Sing, Lam Nai Kei; Fourth official: Cheng Oi Cho

16 September 2012 Week 3	Biu Chun Rangers	1 – 4	Wofoo Tai Po	Sham Shui Po, Kowloon
14:30 (GMT+8)	Liu Songwei (red card) 61'; Leung Hing Kit (yellow card) 77'; Lam Hok Hei 87'	Report	6', 13', 21' Alex; (yellow card) 40' (yellow-red card) 58' Annan; 67' Aender	Stadium: Sham Shui Po Sports Ground (Capatity:2,194); Attendance: 625; Referee: Ng Kai Lam; Assistant referees: Chan Shui Hung, Chung Ming Sang; Fourth official: Yu Chun San

30 September 2012 Week 4	Sunray Cave JC Sun Hei	2 – 2	Biu Chun Rangers	Mong Kok, Kowloon
17:30 (GMT+8)	Zhang Chunhui (red card) 10'; Kilama (red card) 40'; Wong Chun Ho (yellow card) 67'; Ho Kwok Chuen (yellow card) 72'; Bamnjo 81' (o.g.); Barry 86'	Report	(yellow card) 9' Liu Songwei; 13' (pen.) Giovane; (yellow card) 63' Bemnjo; 76' Lam Hok Hei	Stadium: Mong Kok Stadium (Capatity:6,680); Attendance: 645; Referee: Chan Shui Hung; Assistant referees: Chow Chun Kit, Lam Shing Yan, Franky; Fourth official: Luk Kin Sun

5 October 2012 Week 5	Citizen	2 – 3	Biu Chun Rangers	Mong Kok, Kowloon
20:00 (GMT+8)	Campion 41' (pen.); Sham Kwok Fai (yellow card) 42'; Detinho 69'; Festus (yellow card) 89'	Report	73' Lam Hok Hei; (yellow card) 74' (goal) 85' Yeung Chi Lun; 90' (yellow card) 90' Saric	Stadium: Mong Kok Stadium (Capatity:6,680); Attendance: 488; Referee: Ng Chiu Kok; Assistant referees: Lam Chi Ho, Chung Ming Sang; Fourth official: Yu Chun San

20 October 2012 Week 6	Tuen Mun	1 – 0	Biu Chun Rangers	Tuen Mun, New Territories
14:30 (GMT+8)	Mauricio (yellow card) 8'; Li Haiqiang (yellow card) 18'; Daniel 46'; Kwok Wing Sun (yellow card) 84'; Ling Cong (yellow card) 87'	Report	(yellow card) 9' Liu Songwei; (yellow card) 84' Akosah; (yellow card) 90+2' Yeung Chi Lun	Stadium: Tuen Mun Tang Siu Kin Sports Ground (Capatity:2,200); Attendance: 619; Referee: Ng Kai Lam; Assistant referees: Chan Shui Hung, Chow Chun Kit; Fourth official: Sarao, Amarjit Singh

26 October 2012 Week 7	Yokohama FC HK	2 – 4	Biu Chun Rangers	Siu Sai Wan, Hong Kong Island
20:00 (GMT+8)	Yoshitake 40'; Wong Wai 64'	Report	15' Akosah; 36', 63' Lam Hok Hei; 41' Giovane; (yellow card) 43' Chan Siu Yuen; (yellow card) 90+2' Chak Ting Fung	Stadium: Siu Sai Wan Sports Ground (Capatity:12,000); Attendance: 264; Referee: Tong Kui Sum; Assistant referees: Lam Chi Ho, Chung Ming Sang; Fourth official: Luk Kin Sun

4 November 2012 Week 8	Biu Chun Rangers	1 – 3	South China	Mong Kok, Kowloon
14:30 (GMT+8)	Bamnjo 31' (yellow card) 33' (yellow-red card); Miroslav (yellow card) 86'	Report	9' Mauro; 36' Dhiego; 83' Chan Wai Ho	Stadium: Mong Kok Stadium^{1} (Capatity: 6,680); Attendance: 1,738; Referee: Cheng Oi Cho; Assistant referees: Lam Shing Yan, Yu Chun San; Fourth official: Ho Wai Sing

23 December 2012 Week 9	Biu Chun Rangers	2 – 7	Kitchee	Mong Kok, Kowloon
17:30 (GMT+8)	Giovane 36'; Liu Songwei 56'	Report	3', 79' (pen.) Couñago; 13', 41' Jordi; 47' Cheng Siu Wai; 72' Liu Quankun; 86' Chu Siu Kei	Stadium: Mong Kok Stadium^{1} (Capatity:6,680); Attendance: 2,643; Referee: Tong Kui Sum; Assistant referees: Lam Shing Yan, Poon Ming Fai; Fourth official: Cheng Oi Cho

20 January 2013 Week 10	Biu Chun Rangers	3 – 3	Citizen	Sham Shui Po, Kowloon
14:30 (GMT+8)	Leung Hing Kit (red card) 33'; Bamnjo (yellow card) 53'; Giovane 57', 90+5'; Lau Nim Yat (yellow card) 78'; Cheng King Ho 86'	Report	35' Featus; (yellow card) 37' Sandro; (yellow card) 63' Chan Hin Kwong; (yellow card) 67' (goal) 79', 81' Sham Kwok Keung	Stadium: Sham Shui Po Sports Ground (Capatity:2,194); Attendance: 453; Referee: Liu Kwok Man; Assistant referees: Chan Shui Hung, Poon Ming Fai; Fourth official: Ho Wai Sing

26 January 2013 Week 12^{2}	South China	6 – 1	Biu Chun Rangers	So Kon Po, Hong Kong Island
15:00 (GMT+8)	Lee Wai Lim 51', 90'; Celin 52'; Itaparica 64' (yellow card) 76'; Lee Hong Lim 70'; Au Yeung Yiu Chung 84'	Report	13' Lam Hok Hei; (yellow card) 59' Chan Siu Yuen	Stadium: Hong Kong Stadium (Capatity:40,000); Attendance: 1,858; Referee: Tong Kui Sum; Assistant referees: Chan Shui Hung, Ho Wai Sing; Fourth official: Lam Nai Kei

31 January 2013 Week 11	Kitchee	1 – 2	Biu Chun Rangers	Tseung Kwan O, New Territories
20:00 (GMT+8)	Chu Siu Kei 53'; Yago (yellow card) 59'; Tsang Chi Hau (yellow card) 67'	Report	(yellow card) 41' Juninho; 62' Giovane; 68' Saric	Stadium: Tseung Kwan O Sports Ground (Capatity:3,500); Attendance: 457; Referee: Cheng Oi Cho; Assistant referees: Chan Shui Hung, Chung Ming Sang; Fourth official: Lui Siu Chuen

3 March 2013 Week 13	Wofoo Tai Po	1 – 1	Biu Chun Rangers	Tai Po, New Territories
14:30 (GMT+8)	Annan 8'; Alex (yellow card) 85'	Report	4' Giovane; (yellow card) 70' Juninho	Stadium: Tai Po Sports Ground (Capatity:3,000); Attendance: 662; Referee: Ng Chiu Kok; Assistant referees: Chan Shui Hung, Lau Fong Hei; Fourth official: Yu Chun San

17 March 2013 Week 14	Biu Chun Rangers	1 – 1	Yokohama FC Hong Kong	Sham Shui Po, Kowloon
14:30 (GMT+8)	Lam Hok Hei 24'; Luciano 63'; Bamnjo (yellow card) 77' (yellow-red card) 90+8'; Akosah (yellow card) 86'; Miroslav (yellow card) 90+3'	Report	(yellow card) 43' Lam Ngai Tong; (yellow card) 60' Leung Kwok Wai; (yellow card) 82' Fong Pak Lun; (yellow card) 88' Chan Siu Kwan; 90+5' Lee Ka Yiu	Stadium: Sham Shui Po Sports Ground (Capatity:2,194); Attendance: 399; Referee: Ho Wai Sing; Assistant referees: Chung Ming Sang, Poon Ming Fai; Fourth official: Chow Chun Kit

30 March 2013 Week 15	Southern	3 – 1	Biu Chun Rangers	Aberdeen, Hong Kong Island
14:30 (GMT+8)	Rubén 9' (yellow card) 60'; Ngue 77'; Dieguito 82'	Report	(yellow card) 41' Akosah; (yellow card) 60' Lam Hok Hei; (yellow card) 67' Lau Nim Yat; 87' Giovane	Stadium: Aberdeen Sports Ground (Capatity:9,000); Attendance: 301; Referee: Chan Shui Hung; Assistant referees: Poon Ming Fai, Luk Kin Sun; Fourth official: Cheng Oi Cho

14 April 2013 Week 16	Biu Chun Rangers	2 – 2	Sunray Cave JC Sun Hei	Sham Shui Po, Kowloon
14:30 (GMT+8)	Sashi (yellow card) 28'; Bamnjo 55'; Akosah 58'	Report	24' Barry; 41' Leung Tsz Chun; (yellow card) 45+2' Diaz	Stadium: Sham Shui Po Sports Ground (Capatity:2,194); Attendance: 427; Referee: Liu Kwok Man; Assistant referees: Lui Siu Chuen, Fok Pong Shing; Fourth official: Lam Shing Yan Franky

21 April 2013 Week 17	Biu Chun Rangers	1 – 4	Tuen Mun	Sham Shui Po, Kowloon
14:30 (GMT+8)	Akosah 8' (yellow card) 40'; Liu Songwei (yellow card) 33'; Sashi (yellow card) 75'	Report	17' Daniel; 35' Yip Tsz Chun; 38' Li Haiqiang; (yellow card) 45+1' Mauricio; (yellow card) 45+3' Wong Chi Chung; 57' Lai Yiu Cheong; (yellow card) 88' Beto	Stadium: Sham Shui Po Sports Ground (Capatity:2,194); Attendance: 502; Referee: Chan Shui Hung; Assistant referees: Poon Ming Fai, Yau Tsz Yeung; Fourth official: Ho Wai Sing

4 May 2013 Week 18	Biu Chun Rangers	2 – 8	Sun Pegasus	Sham Shui Po, Kowloon
15:30 (GMT+8)	Giovane 83', 89'	Report	21', 53' Ju Yingzhi; 29', 64', 72', 82', 85' McKee; 90' Karalić	Stadium: Sham Shui Po Sports Ground (Capatity:2,194); Attendance: 426; Referee: Ho Wai Sing; Assistant referees: Chung Ming Sang, Yu Chun San; Fourth official: Cheng Oi Cho

Remarks:
^{1} Biu Chun Rangers's home matches against South China and Kitchee were played at Mong Kok Stadium instead of their usual home ground Sham Shui Po Sports Ground.
^{2} South China's home matches against Biu Chun Rangers were rescheduled and played at Mong Kok Stadium instead of their usual home ground of Hong Kong Stadium.

==== Senior Challenge Shield ====
===== First round =====
22 September 2012 1st leg	Biu Chun Rangers	1 – 5	Citizen	Sham Shui Po, Kowloon
14:30 (GMT+8)	Komar 17'; Saric (yellow card) 27'	Report	26', 87' Nakamura; 28' Yuan Yang; 70' Sham Kwok Keung; 90' So Loi Keung	Stadium: Sham Shui Po Sports Ground (Capacity: 2,194); Attendance: 598; Referee: Ng Kai Lam; Assistant referees: Chan Shui Hung, Lam Shing Yan, Franky; Fourth official: Lam Nai Kei

10 October 2012 2nd leg	Citizen	4 – 0 (9 – 1 agg.)	Biu Chun Rangers	Mong Kok, Kowloon
20:00 (GMT+8)	Yuan Yang 39'; Tam Lok Hin 64'; Sham Kwok Keung (yellow card) 68'; Detinho 79'; Si Chi Ho 85'; Campion (yellow card) 86'	Report		Stadium: Mong Kok Stadium (Capacity: 6,680); Attendance: 290; Referee: Ho Wai Sing; Assistant referees: Chow Chun Kit, Chung Ming Sang; Fourth official: Lam Chi Ho

==== FA Cup ====
===== Quarter-finals =====
16 February 2013 1st leg	Kitchee	2 – 1	Biu Chun Rangers	Tseung Kwan O, New Territories
17:30(GMT+8)	Yago 44'; Lo Kwan Yee 90'	Report	45' Miroslav; (yellow card) 80' Luciano; (yellow card) 87' Bamnjo	Stadium: Tseung Kwan O Sports Ground (Capacity: 3,500); Attendance: 560; Referee: Ng Chiu Kok; Assistant referees: Chan Shui Hung, Lui Siu Chuen; Fourth official: Lam Chi Ho

9 March 2013 2nd leg	Biu Chun Rangers	0 – 0 (1 – 2 agg.)	Kitchee	Sham Shui Po, Kowloon
14:30(GMT+8)	Bamnjo (yellow card) 36'	Report	(yellow card) 16' Tsang Kam To	Stadium: Sham Shui Po Sports Ground (Capacity: 2,194); Attendance: 669; Referee: Ng Kai Lam; Assistant referees: Chow Chun Kit, Lam Nai Kei; Fourth official: Chan Shui Hung
