= Yeung Chi Lun =

Hong Kong footballer (born 1989)

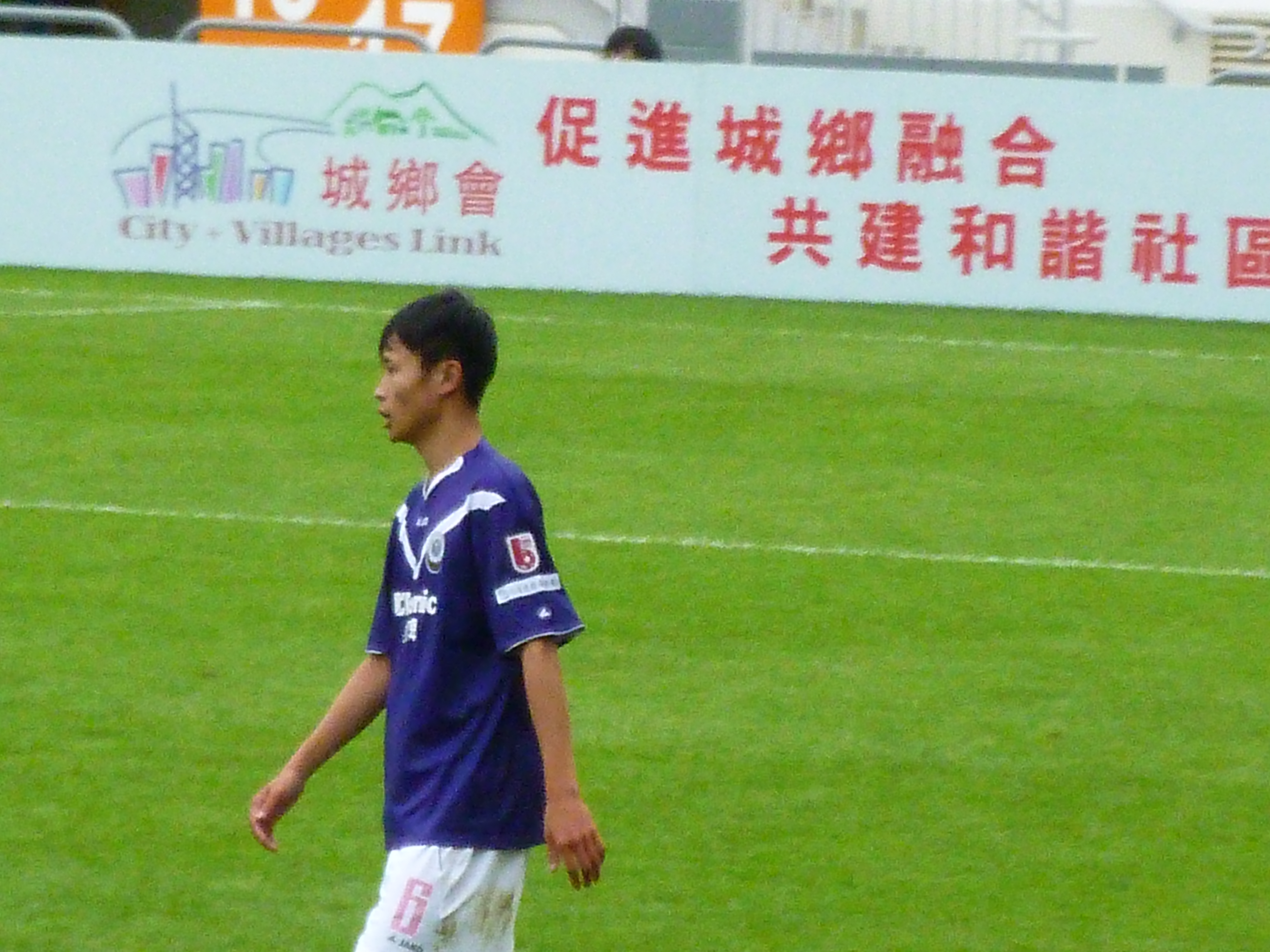

Personal information
- Full name: Lewis Yeung Chi Lun
- Date of birth: 20 November 1989 (age 36)
- Place of birth: Hong Kong
- Height: 1.82 m (6 ft 0 in)
- Positions: Midfielder; defender

Youth career
- 2003–2007: Hong Kong Rangers
- 2007–2008: Hong Kong 09

Senior career*
Years	Team	Apps	(Gls)
2008–2012	Citizen	42	(5)
2012–2013	Hong Kong Rangers	7	(1)
2013	Sun Hei	8	(0)
2013–2014	Happy Valley	8	(0)
2014	Hong Kong Rangers	1	(1)
2014–2016	Wong Tai Sin	27	(1)
2016–2017	Biu Chun Glory Sky	11	(3)
2017–2018	Pegasus	8	(1)
2017–2018	→ Hong Kong Rangers (loan)	14	(0)
2018–2020	Tai Po	12	(0)
2020–2021	Metro Gallery	12	(1)
2021	Heng Wah		
2021–2023	Happy Valley	33	(3)
2024–	Kui Tan	21	(12)

International career
- Hong Kong U23
- * Club domestic league appearances and goals as of 31 May 2026

Lewis Yeung Chi Lun (Chinese: 楊賜麟; born 20 November 1989) is a Hong Kong former professional footballer who played as a midfielder or a defender.

== Club career ==
=== Early career ===
Yeung studied at Yan Chai Hospital Tung Chi Ying Memorial Secondary School, which is a school notable for impressive football results in the inter-school competitions. He helped the school win the inter-school football Jing Ying competition champions three times, and was awards the MVP of the tournament in 2007–2008.

Yeung was a member of Rangers youth academy. He then joined Hong Kong 09 in 2007.

=== Citizen ===
Yeung joined Hong Kong First Division League club Citizen in 2008. He scored 3 league goals in his debut season when he was only 19 years old.

=== Rangers ===
He returned to Rangers in July 2012. However, due to lack of match playing chance, he chose to leave the club in the winter transfer window.

=== Sun Hei ===
Yeung joined fellow First Division club Sun Hei in January 2013. He helped the club avoid relegation to the Second Division, although he was sent off on the last league matchday against South China.

=== Happy Valley ===
Yeung joined newly promoted First Division club Happy Valley on a free transfer.

=== Tai Po ===
Following Rangers' relegation from the HKPL after the 2017–18 season, Yeung remarked that there was no point in staying given the quality of the club. He was announced as a Tai Po player on 31 July 2018.

== Career statistics ==
=== Club ===
As of 4 May 2013

Club	Season	Division	League		Senior Shield		League Cup		FA Cup		AFC Cup		Others^{1}		Total	
Club	Season	Division	Apps	Goals	Apps	Goals	Apps	Goals	Apps	Goals	Apps	Goals	Apps	Goals	Apps	Goals
Citizen	2008–09	First Division	10	3	0	0	0	0	0	0	N/A	N/A	N/A	N/A	10	3
Citizen	2009–10	First Division	11	1	2	0	—	—	1	0	N/A	N/A	N/A	N/A	14	1
Citizen	2010–11	First Division	12	1	1	0	0	0	1	0	N/A	N/A	N/A	N/A	14	1
Citizen	2011–12	First Division	9	0	2	0	2	0	1	0	5	0	N/A	N/A	19	0
Citizen Total			42	5	5	0	2	0	3	0	5	0	0	0	57	5
Biu Chun Rangers	2012–13	First Division	7	1	2	0	—	—	0	0	N/A	N/A	N/A	N/A	9	1
Rangers Total			7	1	2	0	0	0	0	0	0	0	0	0	9	1
Sunray Cave JC Sun Hei	2012–13	First Division	7	0	0	0	—	—	1	0	5	1	N/A	N/A	13	1
Sun Hei Total			7	0	0	0	0	0	1	0	5	1	0	0	13	1
Happy Valley	2013–14	First Division	0	0	0	0	—	—	0	0	N/A	N/A	N/A	N/A	0	0
Happy Valley Total			0	0	0	0	0	0	0	0	0	0	0	0	0	0
Total			56	6	7	0	2	0	4	0	10	1	0	0	79	7

=== Notes ===
1. Others include Hong Kong season play-offs.

== Honours ==
=== Club ===
Tai Po

- Hong Kong Premier League: 2018–19
