= Dean Evans =

Australian footballer (born 1990)

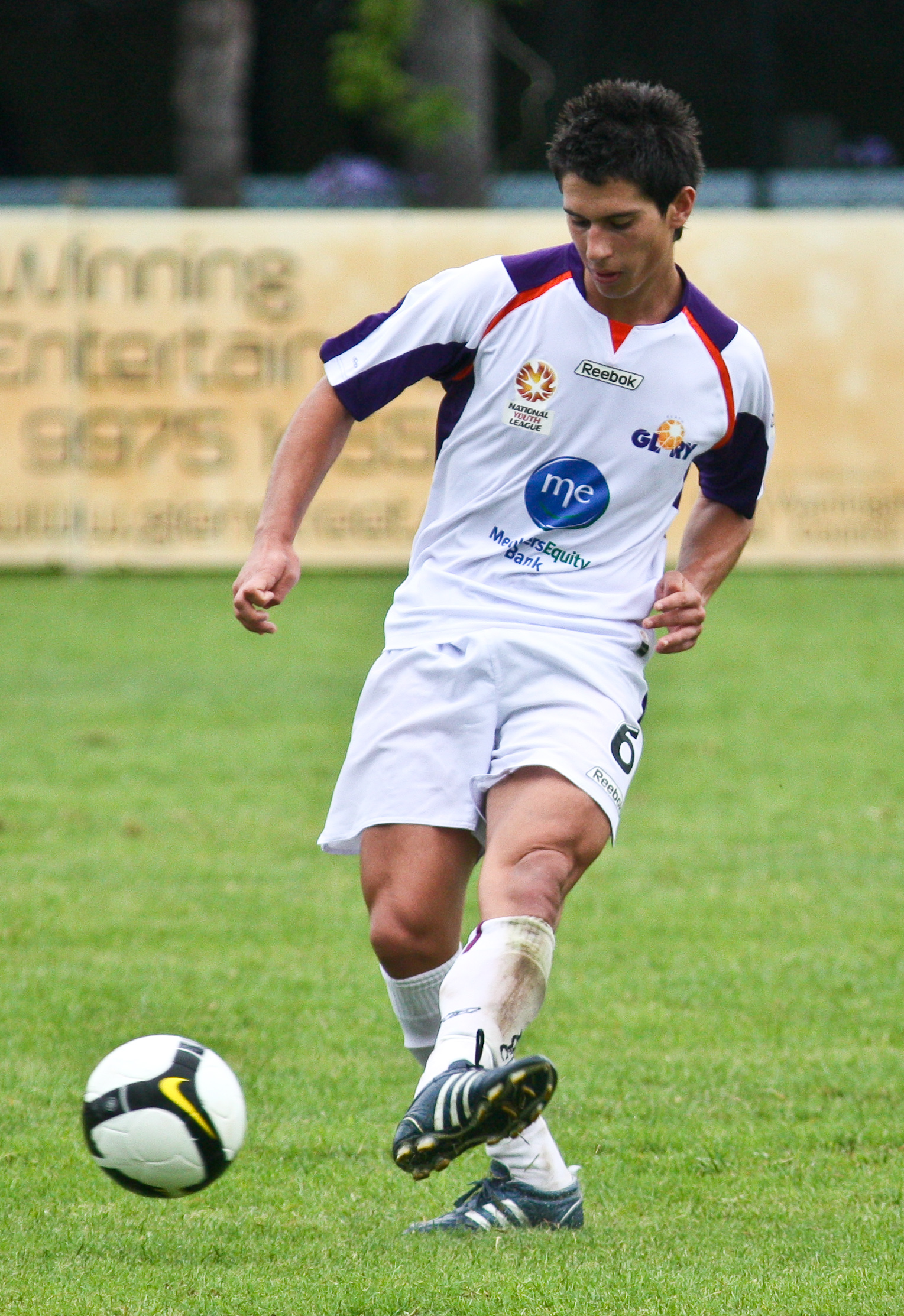
- Perth Glory Youth in 2009

Personal information
- Full name: Dean Evans
- Date of birth: 7 March 1990 (age 36)
- Place of birth: Perth, Western Australia
- Height: 1.81 m (5 ft 11 in)
- Position: Centre midfielder

Team information
- Current team: Floreat Athena

Youth career
- 2007: FW NTC
- 2008–2011: Perth Glory Youth

Senior career*
Years	Team	Apps	(Gls)
2008	Stirling Lions		
2009–2011	Perth Glory	1	(0)
2011	Kitchee	0	(0)
2011–2012	Sham Shui Po	10	(0)
2012–2013	Stirling Lions	0	(0)
2013	Perth Glory	0	(0)
2014	Stirling Lions	13	(1)
2015–2016	Perth SC	32	(7)
2016–	Floreat Athena	111	(29)
- * Club domestic league appearances and goals as of 8 November 2021

Dean Evans (born 7 March 1990) is an Australian footballer who currently plays for Floreat Athena FC.

He attended high school at Wesley College in South Perth.

== Career ==
Dean signed on for his home town club Perth Glory's inaugural youth league team, and was a regular starter. He made his senior debut for Perth Glory as a substitute on 24 January 2009 against Queensland Roar.

=== Kitchee SC ===
On 1 July 2011, Dean Evans joined Kitchee SC as the Hong Kong League champions prepare for the defence of their league title and their first AFC Cup campaign. Evans' identity as an Asian expatriate will help Kitchee in the AFC Cup, allowing them to devote their overseas player quota to their Spanish legion. But after training with the club and two games with the team in the 2011 Barclays Asia Trophy, Dean Evans has been considered unsuitable for Kitchee's needs and therefore not been granted a contract.

=== Sham Shui Po SA ===
On 4 January 2012, Sham Shui Po SA announced they have signed Dean Evans for the remainder of the 2011–12 Hong Kong First Division League season. He made his debut for the club on 8 January 2012 against Hong Kong Sapling.

=== Perth Glory ===
On 9 September 2013, after a series of good play on Glory's recent tour of South Africa, Dean Evans rejoined his home town club Perth Glory as a three-month injury-replacement.

== Career statistics ==
As of 8 January 2012

Club	Season	League			Finals			Asia			Total		
Club	Season	Apps	Goals	Assists	Apps	Goals	Assists	Apps	Goals	Assists	Apps	Goals	Assists
Perth Glory	2009–10	1	0	0	-	-	-	-	-	-	1	0	0
Perth Glory	2010–11	0	0	0	-	-	-	-	-	-	0	0	0
Club	Season	League			Cups			Asia			Total		
Club	Season	Apps	Goals	Assists	Apps	Goals	Assists	Apps	Goals	Assists	Apps	Goals	Assists
Kitchee	2011–12	0	0	0	-	-	-	-	-	-	0	0	0
Sham Shui Po	2011–12	1	0	0	-	-	-	-	-	-	1	0	0
Total		2	0	0	-	-	-	-	-	-	2	0	0

== Honours ==
Personal honours

- Most Glorious Youth player: 2009–10
- Most Glorious Youth player: 2010–11
