= Leung Ka Hai =

Hong Kong footballer

Leung Ka Hai 梁家希
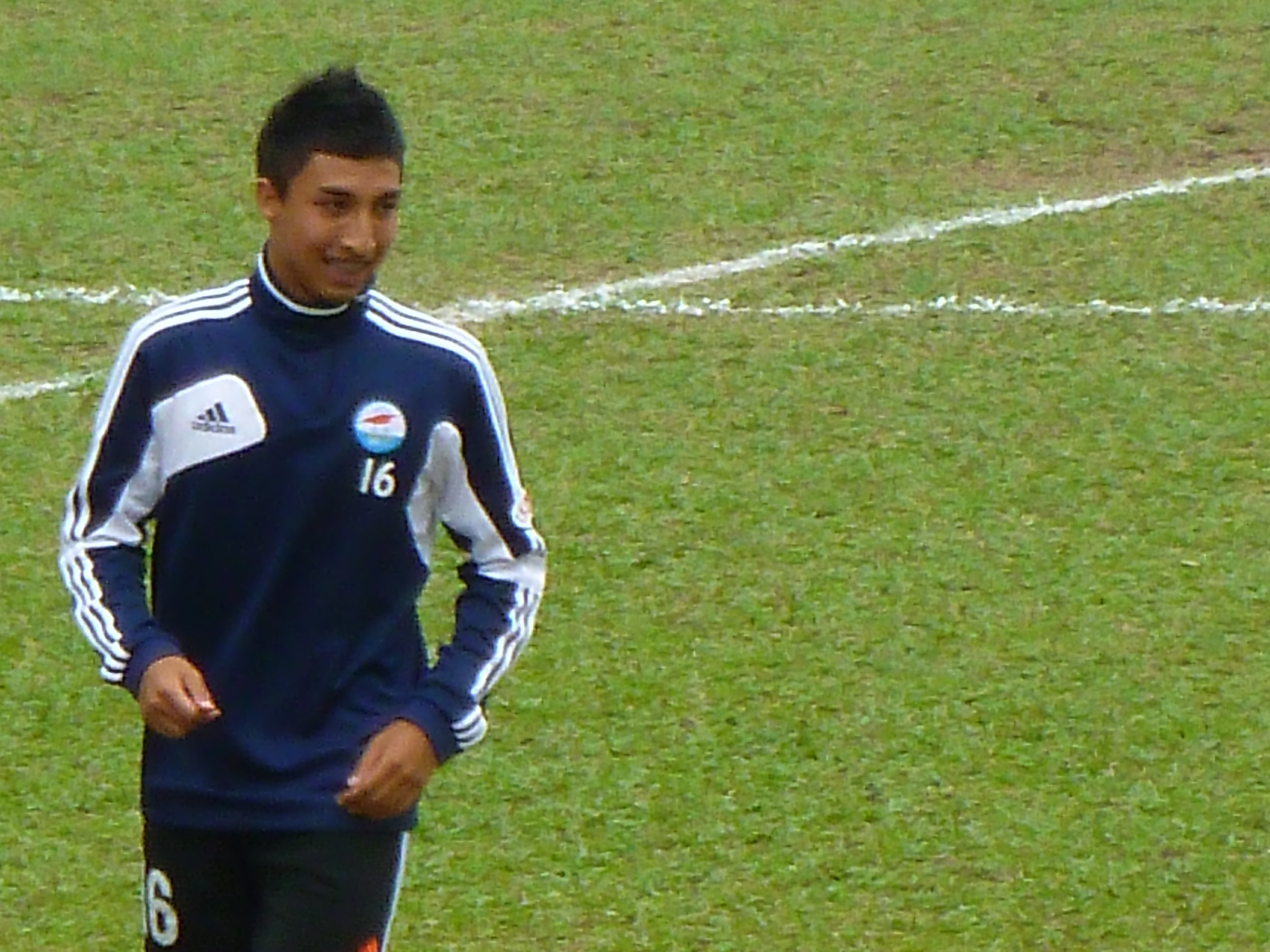

Personal information
- Full name: Robson Augusto Ka Hai Leung
- Date of birth: 12 April 1993 (age 33)
- Place of birth: Matelândia, Paraná, Brazil
- Height: 1.78 m (5 ft 10 in)
- Positions: Right back; defensive midfielder

Youth career
- 2006–2008: Kitchee

Senior career*
Years	Team	Apps	(Gls)
2008–2015	Kitchee	3	(1)
2011–2012	→ Tai Chung (loan)	8	(3)
2012–2013	→ Sun Hei (loan)	6	(0)
2015–2016	→ Southern (loan)	9	(0)
2016–2017	R&F	1	(0)
2018	Dreams FC	3	(0)
2018–2019	Eastern District	0	(0)

International career
2008–2010	Hong Kong U17		
2010–2013	Hong Kong U20		
2013–2014	Hong Kong U23	3	(1)
- * Club domestic league appearances and goals as of 12 May 2019

Robson Augusto Ka Hai Leung (Chinese: 梁家希; Jyutping: loeng^{4} gaa^{1} hei^{1} ; born 22 April 1993), commonly known as Leung Ka Hai, is a former professional footballer who played as a right back or a defensive midfielder. Born in Brazil, he represented Hong Kong internationally.

== Early years ==
Born in Brazil to a Hongkonger father and a Brazilian mother, Leung followed his father and moved to Hong Kong when he was 9 years old. He then joined the youth team of Kitchee, and help Kitchee to win the under-15 group of Nike Hong Kong Premier Cup in 2008. He, along with his teammates, had a chance to compete with other 11 teams in mainland China for the chance to the Old Trafford.

== Club career ==
In March 2008, Kitchee submitted the player list for 2008 AFC Cup. Leung was selected and listed on the list. Just a month later, on 26 April 2008, Leung Ka Hai made his senior career debut against Lanwa Redbull as a 75th-minute substitute. At the age of 15 years and 4 days, Leung was the youngest-ever debutante in the Hong Kong First Division League, a record previously held by his teammate Lo Kwan Yee. In the summer of 2011, Leung was loaned to Hong Kong Second Division club Tai Chung. However, in January 2012, he was called back to Kitchee for the 2012 AFC Cup. Leung joined Sun Hei on loan from Kitchee until the end of the 2013–14 season.

On 31 January 2018, Dreams FC announced that they had signed Leung.

== Playing style ==
Like a usual Brazilian full-back, Leung always joins attack from the back in a match although he plays as a right-back. Due to his aggressive playing style, he was called as Cafu.

== Career statistics ==
=== Club ===
As of 26 September 2012

Club performance			League		Cup				League Cup		Continental		Total	
Season	Club	League	Apps	Goals	Apps	Goals	Apps	Goals	Apps	Goals	Apps	Goals	Apps	Goals
Hong Kong			League		Senior Shield		FA Cup		League Cup		AFC Cup		Total	
2007–08	Kitchee	First Division	1	0	0	0	0	0	0	0	0	0	1	0
2008–09	Kitchee	First Division	0	0	0	0	0	0	0	0	N/A	N/A	0	0
2009–10	Kitchee	First Division	0	0	0	0	0	0	0	0	N/A	N/A	0	0
2010–11	Kitchee	First Division	0	0	0	0	0	0	0	0	N/A	N/A	0	0
2011–12	Tai Chung (loan)	Second Division	8	3	4^{1}	1^{1}	N/A	N/A	N/A	N/A	N/A	N/A	12	4
2011–12	Kitchee	First Division	0	0	0	0	0	0	0	0	0	0	0	0
2012–13	Sun Hei (loan)	First Division	6	0	2	0	2	0	0	0	2	0	12	0
Kitchee Total			1	0	0	0	0	0	0	0	0	0	1	0
Tai Chung Total			8	3	4	1	0	0	0	0	0	0	12	4
Sun Hei Total			6	0	2	0	2	0	0	0	2	0	12	0
Hong Kong Total			15	3	6	1	2	0	0	0	2	0	25	4
Career Total			15	3	6	1	2	0	0	0	2	0	25	4

^{1} – Since Tai Chung was playing in the Hong Kong Second Division in the 2011–12 season, the club would compete in the Junior Shield but not in the Senior Shield.
