= Jean-Jacques Kilama =

Hong Kong footballer

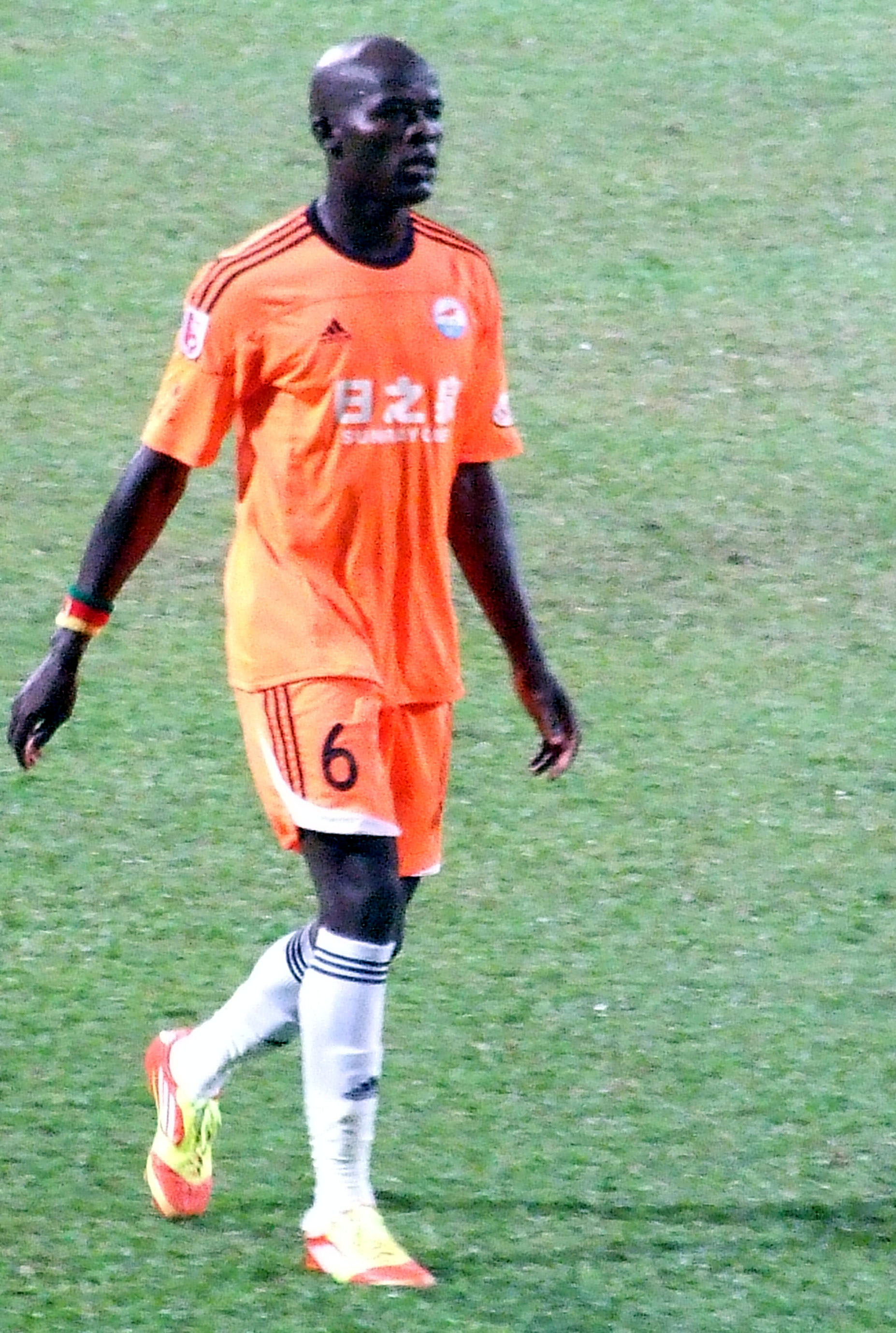

Personal information
- Date of birth: 13 October 1985 (age 41)
- Place of birth: Yaoundé, Cameroon
- Height: 1.85 m (6 ft 1 in)
- Position: Centre-back

Senior career*
Years	Team	Apps	(Gls)
2004–2007	PSDS Deli Serdang	56	(5)
2007–2008	Hong Kong Rangers	12	(0)
2008–2011	Fourway Rangers	30	(2)
2011–2014	Sun Hei	50	(7)
2014–2015	Eastern	19	(2)
2016–2017	Tianjin Quanjian	7	(0)
2018	Pegasus	4	(1)
2018–2019	Tai Po	5	(0)
2019–2024	Hong Kong Rangers	44	(2)
2024	Fu Moon	7	(4)
2025	Eastern District	6	(0)
2026–	Wui Hong		

International career
2015–2017	Hong Kong	15	(0)
- * Club domestic league appearances and goals

Jean-Jacques Kilama (Chinese: 基藍馬; born 13 October 1985) is a former professional footballer. Born in Cameroon, he represented Hong Kong at international level.

== Club career ==
=== Indonesia ===
Kilama played in Indonesia before moving to Hong Kong. Then his elder brother, Roger, a player who formerly played for Rangers (HKG) suggested to him to move to Hong Kong and join the Hong Kong First Division club.

=== Hong Kong ===
==== Rangers ====
Kilama joined Rangers in 2008. Although he had an impressive performance in the first season, Rangers were nevertheless relegated. Therefore, he left the club for Fourway Rangers.

In July 2010, Kilama was selected for the Hong Kong League Selection friendly against Birmingham City at the Hong Kong Stadium.

==== Sun Hei ====
In the 2011–12 season, Kilama moved to Sun Hei from Fourway Rangers. On 22 October 2011, Kilama was sent off in the match against Rangers. Coach Ricardo hopes he can learn from this experience. On 7 January 2012, Kilama was sent off and gave away a penalty after elbowing Pegasus defender Lucas. Sun Hei lost the game 1-3.

==== Eastern ====
Kilama moved to another Hong Kong Premier League club Eastern.

==== Tianjin Quanjian ====
In December 2015, Kilama joined Chinese League One team Tianjin Quanjian, after having two impressive games against China national team for Hong Kong.

==== Pegasus ====
On 1 February 2018, Kilama joined Pegasus on a free transfer, returning to Hong Kong following two seasons abroad.

==== Tai Po ====
On 6 August 2018, Tai Po announced the singing of Kilama ahead of their preseason training camp.

==== Rangers ====
On 16 September 2019, Kilama signed with Rangers, returning to the club after eight years.

On 10 September 2020, Rangers confirmed that Kilama had renewed his contract for another season.

In the 2020–21 season, Kilama featured as the main role of the Ranger's defence and he scored 1 goal in 4 matches before the league was suspended in September 2020.

On 24 September 2023, Kilama announced his retirement from professional football. However, he then continuously played for the club in the season as the club suffered from injury crisis. He officially retired at the end of the season.

== International career ==
Kilama made his international debut for Hong Kong against Bhutan on 11 June 2015 in a 2018 FIFA World Cup qualifier.

== 2009 Hong Kong match fixing scandal ==
In October 2009, Happy Valley player Yu Yang offered a bribe to Kilama to play an unfair match against Happy Valley. However, Kilama rejected and told this to Rangers chairman Philip Lee as well as to the Hong Kong Football Association. On 5 May 2010, the ICAC confirmed his account and arrested five Chinese football players, including former Fourway Rangers Yu Yang.

== Career statistics ==
=== International ===
As of 5 September 2017

National team	Year	Apps	Goals
Hong Kong	2015	8	0
Hong Kong	2016	1	0
Hong Kong	2017	6	0
Total		15	0

== Honours ==
Tianjin Quanjian

- China League One: 2016

Tai Po

- Hong Kong Premier League: 2018–19

Rangers

- Hong Kong Sapling Cup: 2023–24
