= Wong Chun Ho =

Hong Kong footballer

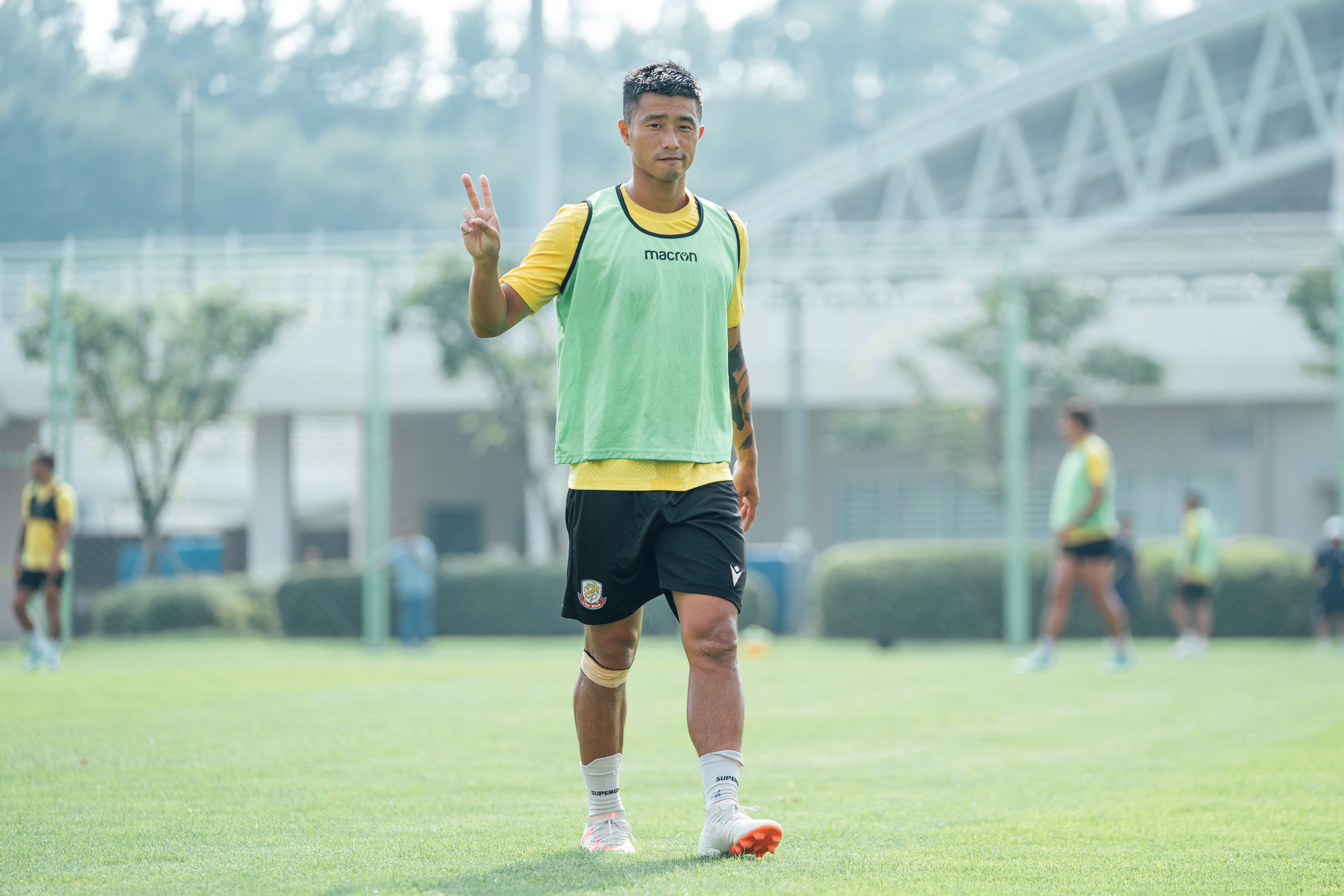

Personal information
- Full name: Wong Chun Ho
- Date of birth: 31 May 1990 (age 36)
- Place of birth: Hong Kong
- Height: 1.70 m (5 ft 7 in)
- Positions: Right back; defensive midfielder

Team information
- Current team: North District
- Number: 3

Senior career*
| Years | Team | Apps | (Gls) |
| 2008–2009 | Mutual | 14 | (0) |
| 2009–2010 | Happy Valley | 17 | (0) |
| 2010–2014 | Sun Hei | 59 | (3) |
| 2014–2015 | YFCMD | 16 | (0) |
| 2015–2020 | Pegasus | 71 | (1) |
| 2020–2025 | Lee Man | 59 | (2) |
| 2025– | North District | 27 | (0) |
- * Club domestic league appearances and goals as of 20 November 2026

Wong Chun Ho (Chinese: 黃俊皓, born 31 May 1990) is a Hong Kong professional footballer who currently plays as a right back or a defensive midfielder for Hong Kong Premier League club North District.

== Club career ==
In 2009, Wong joined Hong Kong First Division club Happy Valley.

In 2010, Wong joined First Division club Sun Hei.

On 6 May 2012, Wong scored a goal in second half for Sun Hei against Sham Shui Po, which the match wins 1–0.

In July 2014, Wong joined Hong Kong Premier League club YFCMD.

In July 2015, Wong joined Pegasus. Prior to the start of the 2017–18 season, Wong was named as the vice-captain of the club.

On 3 July 2020, Wong joined Lee Man.

On 21 July 2025, Wong joined North District.

== Honour ==
Lee Man

- Hong Kong Premier League: 2023–24
