= Cheung Kin Fung =

Hong Kong footballer

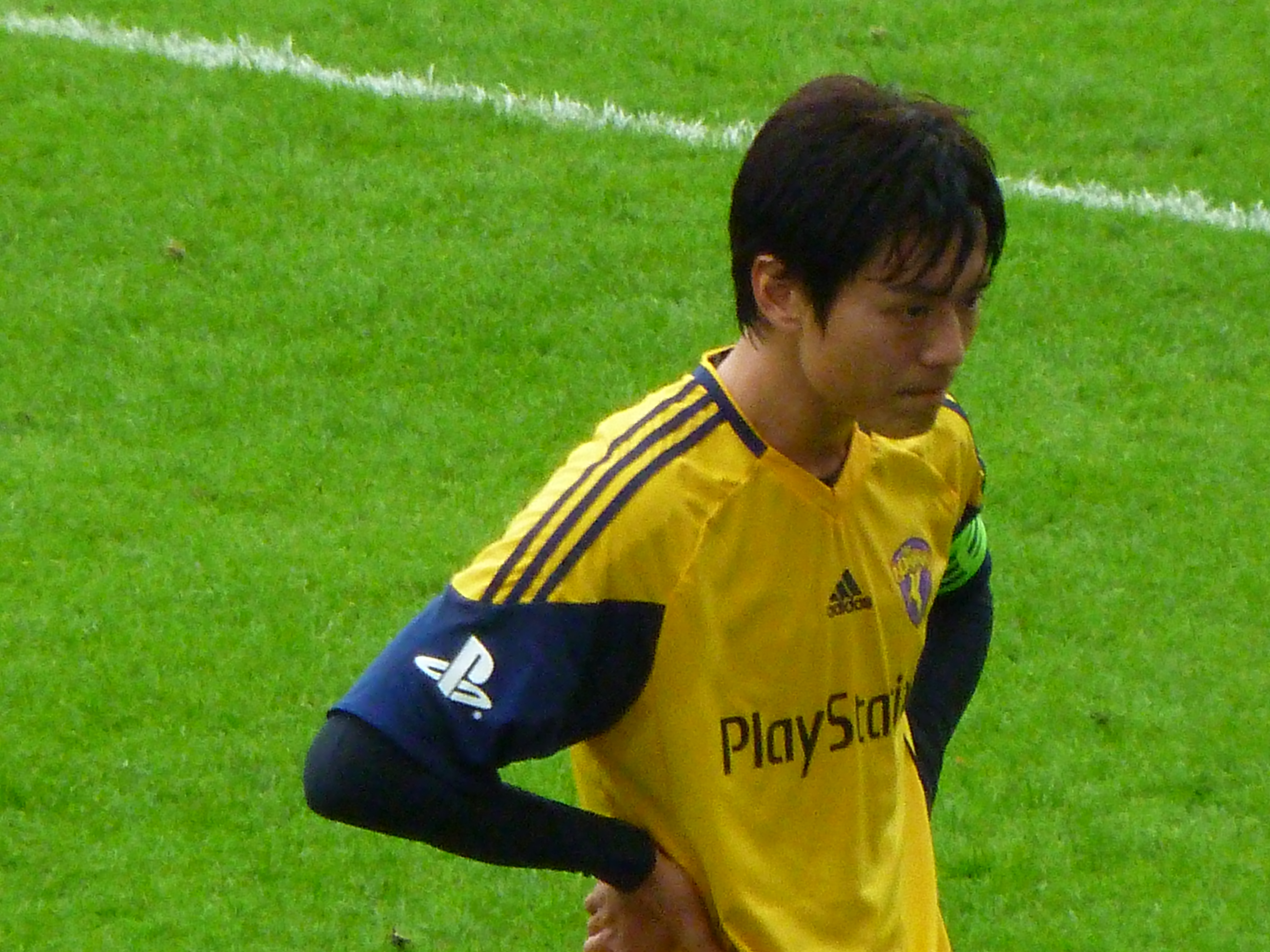

Personal information
- Full name: Cheung Kin Fung
- Date of birth: 1 January 1984 (age 42)
- Place of birth: Hong Kong
- Height: 1.80 m (5 ft 11 in)
- Position: Left back

Youth career
- 1998–2000: Rangers (HKG)

Senior career*
Years	Team	Apps	(Gls)
2000–2004	Rangers (HKG)	44	(4)
2004–2008	Kitchee	80	(9)
2008–2012	Pegasus	66	(5)
2012–2013	Sun Hei	9	(0)
2013	→ Kitchee (loan)	5	(0)
2014–2015	Kitchee	12	(0)
2015–2017	South China	16	(1)
2016–2017	→ Rangers (HKG) (loan)	16	(0)
2017–2019	Eastern	5	(0)
2019	→ Yuen Long (loan)	9	(1)
2023–	→ Konger FC		

International career^{‡}
2002–2007	Hong Kong U-23		
2006–2016	Hong Kong	41	(0)

Managerial career
- 2009–2012: Pegasus (youth coach)
- 2017–2019: Eastern (youth coach)
- 2019–2022: Hong Kong U-19
- 2021–2022: Hong Kong U-22
- 2021–2022: HK U23
- * Club domestic league appearances and goals as of 19 May 2019 ‡ National team caps and goals as of 7 January 2019

Cheung Kin Fung (Chinese: 張健峰; Cantonese Yale: Jēung Gihnfūng; born 1 January 1984 in Hong Kong) is a former Hong Kong professional footballer and manager who played as a left back.

== Career statistics ==
=== Club ===
As of 11 September 2009

Club	Season	League		Senior Shield		League Cup		FA Cup		AFC Cup		Total	
Club	Season	Apps	Goals	Apps	Goals	Apps	Goals	Apps	Goals	Apps	Goals	Apps	Goals
TSW Pegasus	2008–09	12 (9)	2	3 (0)	0	0 (2)	0	1 (3)	0	N/A	N/A	16 (14)	2
TSW Pegasus	2009–10	5 (0)	0	0 (0)	0	0 (0)	0	0 (0)	0	N/A	N/A	5 (0)	0
TSW Pegasus	All	17 (9)	2	3 (0)	0	0 (2)	0	1 (3)	0	N/A	N/A	21 (14)	2

=== International ===
As of 1 September 2016

#	Date	Venue	Opponent	Result	Scored	Competition
1	1 February 2006	Hong Kong Stadium, Hong Kong	Croatia	0–4	0	2006 Carlsberg Cup
2	11 October 2006	Al-Gharafa Stadium, Doha, Qatar	Qatar	0–2	0	2007 AFC Asian Cup qualification
3	15 November 2006	Mong Kok Stadium, Hong Kong	Bangladesh	2–0	0	2007 AFC Asian Cup qualification
4	10 June 2007	So Kon Po Recreation Ground, Hong Kong	Macau	2–1	0	Hong Kong-Macau Interport
5	19 June 2007	Estádio Campo Desportivo, Macau	Chinese Taipei	1–1	0	2008 EAFF Championship Preliminary
6	21 October 2007	Gianyar Stadium, Gianyar, Indonesia	Timor-Leste	3–2	0	2010 FIFA World Cup qualification
7	18 November 2007	Olympic Stadium, Ashgabat, Turkmenistan	Turkmenistan	0–3	0	2010 FIFA World Cup qualification
8	19 November 2008	Macau UST Stadium, Hong Kong	Macau	9–1	0	Friendly
9	21 January 2009	Hong Kong Stadium, Hong Kong	Bahrain	1–3	0	2011 AFC Asian Cup qualification
10	28 January 2009	Ali Muhesen Stadium, Sana'a, Yemen	Yemen	1–0	0	2011 AFC Asian Cup qualification
11	1 June 2012	Hong Kong Stadium, Hong Kong	Singapore	1–0	0	Friendly
12	10 June 2012	Mong Kok Stadium, Hong Kong	Vietnam	1–2	0	Friendly
13	15 August 2012	Jurong West Stadium, Singapore	Singapore	0–2	0	Friendly
14	16 October 2012	Mong Kok Stadium, Mong Kok, Kowloon	Malaysia	0–3	0	Friendly
15	1 December 2012	Mong Kok Stadium, Mong Kok, Hong Kong	Guam	2–1	0	2013 EAFF East Asian Cup Preliminary Competition Round 2
16	7 December 2012	Hong Kong Stadium, So Kon Po, Hong Kong	Chinese Taipei	2–0	0	2013 EAFF East Asian Cup Preliminary Competition Round 2
17	9 December 2012	Hong Kong Stadium, So Kon Po, Hong Kong	North Korea	0–4	0	2013 EAFF East Asian Cup Preliminary Competition Round 2
18	6 February 2013	Pakhtakor Stadium, Uzbekistan	Uzbekistan	0–0	0	2015 AFC Asian Cup qualification
19	22 March 2013	Mong Kok Stadium, Mong Kok, Hong Kong	Vietnam	1–0	0	2015 AFC Asian Cup qualification
20	4 June 2013	Mong Kok Stadium, Mong Kok, Hong Kong	Philippines	0–1	0	Friendly
	6 September 2013	Thuwunna Stadium, Yangon, Myanmar	Myanmar	0–0	0	Friendly
21	10 September 2013	Mong Kok Stadium, Mong Kok, Hong Kong	Singapore	1–0	0	Friendly
22	15 November 2013	Mohammed Bin Zayed Stadium, Abu Dhabi, United Arab Emirates	United Arab Emirates	0–4	0	2015 AFC Asian Cup qualification
23	19 November 2013	Hong Kong Stadium, So Kon Po, Hong Kong	Uzbekistan	0–2	0	2015 AFC Asian Cup qualification
24	6 September 2014	Lạch Tray Stadium, Hai Phong, Vietnam	Vietnam	1–3	0	Friendly
25	9 September 2014	Hougang Stadium, Hougang, Singapore	Singapore	0–0	0	Friendly
26	10 October 2014	Mong Kok Stadium, Hong Kong	Singapore	2–1	0	Friendly
27	14 October 2014	Hong Kong Stadium, Hong Kong	Argentina	0–7	0	Friendly
28	13 November 2014	Taipei Municipal Stadium, Taipei, Taiwan	North Korea	1–2	0	2015 EAFF East Asian Cup preliminary round 2
29	19 November 2014	Taipei Municipal Stadium, Taipei, Taiwan	Guam	0–0	0	2015 EAFF East Asian Cup preliminary round 2
30	28 March 2015	Mong Kok Stadium, Hong Kong	Guam	1–0	0	Friendly
31	6 June 2015	Shah Alam Stadium, Selangor, Malaysia	Malaysia	0–0	0	Friendly
32	11 June 2015	Mong Kok Stadium, Hong Kong	Bhutan	7–0	0	2018 FIFA World Cup qualification – AFC second round
33	16 June 2015	Mong Kok Stadium, Hong Kong	Maldives	2–0	0	2018 FIFA World Cup qualification – AFC second round
34	8 September 2015	Mong Kok Stadium, Hong Kong	Qatar	2–3	0	2018 FIFA World Cup qualification – AFC second round
35	9 October 2015	Rajamangala Stadium, Bangkok, Thailand	Thailand	0–1	0	Friendly
36	13 October 2015	Changlimithang Stadium, Thimphu, Bhutan	Bhutan	1–0	0	2018 FIFA World Cup qualification – AFC second round
37	7 November 2015	Mong Kok Stadium, Hong Kong	Myanmar	5–0	0	Friendly
38	12 November 2015	National Football Stadium, Malé, Maldives	Maldives	1–0	0	2018 FIFA World Cup qualification – AFC second round
39	17 November 2015	Mong Kok Stadium, Hong Kong	China	0–0	0	2018 FIFA World Cup qualification – AFC second round
40	1 September 2016	Mong Kok Stadium, Hong Kong	Cambodia	4–2	0	Friendly

== Honours ==
=== Club ===
Kitchee

- Hong Kong Premier League: 2014–15
- Hong Kong First Division: 2013–14
- Hong Kong Senior Shield: 2005–06
- Hong Kong FA Cup: 2012–13, 2014–15
- HKFA League Cup: 2005–06, 2006–07, 2014–15

Pegasus

- Hong Kong Senior Shield: 2008–09
- Hong Kong FA Cup: 2009–10

Awards
Preceded by Cristiano Cordeiro	Hong Kong League Cup Best Defensive Player; 2005–06	Succeeded by Darko Rakočević
