= Cheung Kwok Ming =

Hong Kong footballer

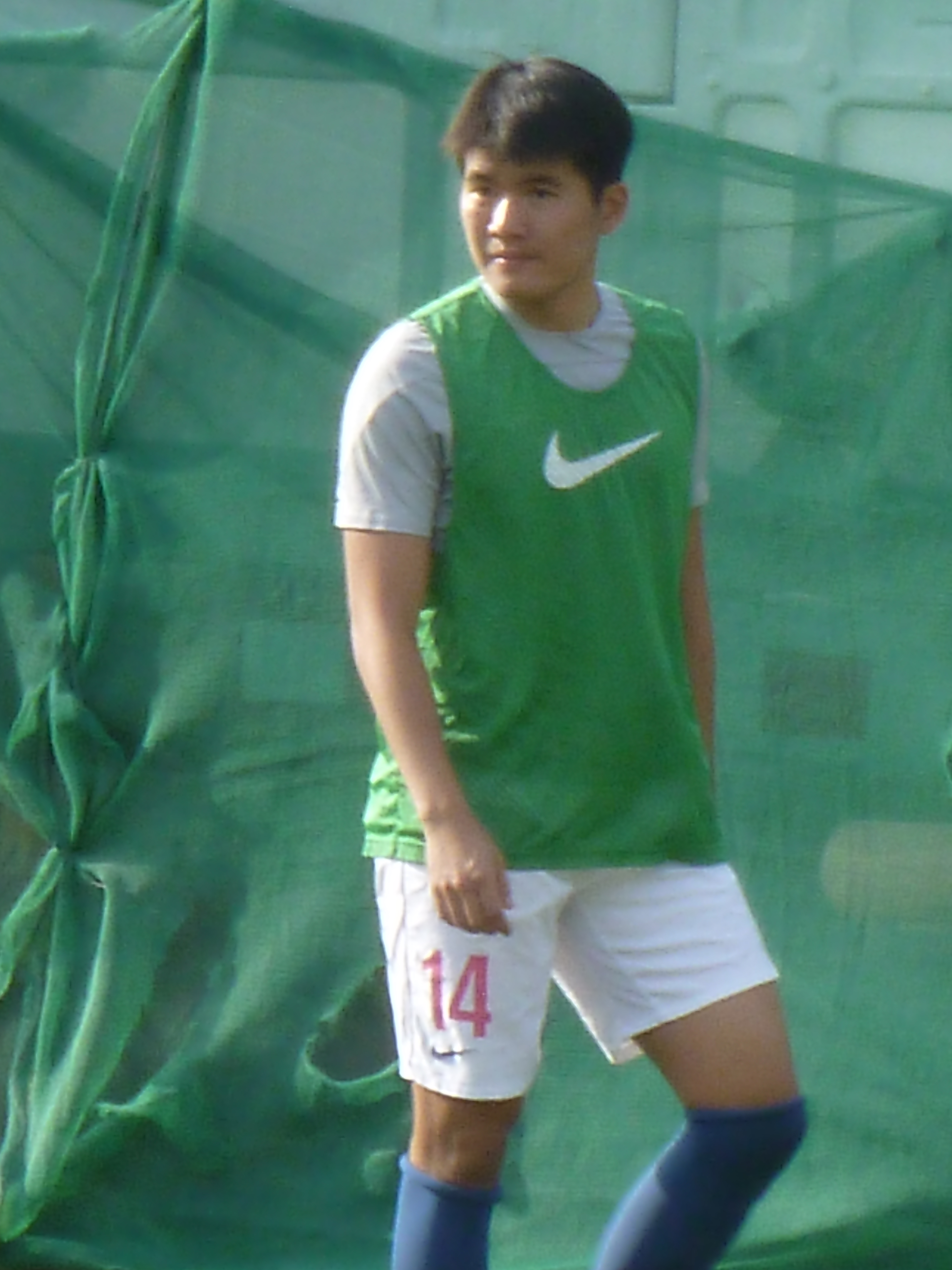

Personal information
- Full name: Cheung Kwok Ming
- Date of birth: 23 December 1990 (age 35)
- Place of birth: Hong Kong
- Height: 1.73 m (5 ft 8 in)
- Positions: Left back; left wing

Youth career
- Shatin

Senior career*
Years	Team	Apps	(Gls)
2008–2010	Shatin	3	(1)
2010–2012	Citizen	7	(0)
2012	→ Hong Kong Sapling (loan)	8	(0)
2012–2014	Sun Hei	23	(4)
2014–2016	Kitchee	5	(0)
2016–2017	R&F	7	(0)
2017	Biu Chun Glory Sky	5	(0)
2017–2018	Hong Kong Rangers	12	(0)
2018–2019	Pegasus	8	(0)
2019–2024	Shatin	70	(22)
2024–2025	Wing Go	13	(4)
2025–	Fu Moon	13	(3)
- * Club domestic league appearances and goals as of 31 May 2026

Cheung Kwok Ming (Chinese: 張國明; born 23 December 1990) is a former Hong Kong professional footballer.

== Club career ==
Cheung started his senior career with Shatin. In 2012, he signed for Sun Hei, where he made 29 appearances and scored 5 goals. After that, he also played for Kitchee, R&F, Biu Chun Glory Sky, Rangers, Pegasus, and Shatin.
