= Liang Zicheng =

Chinese footballer (born 1982)

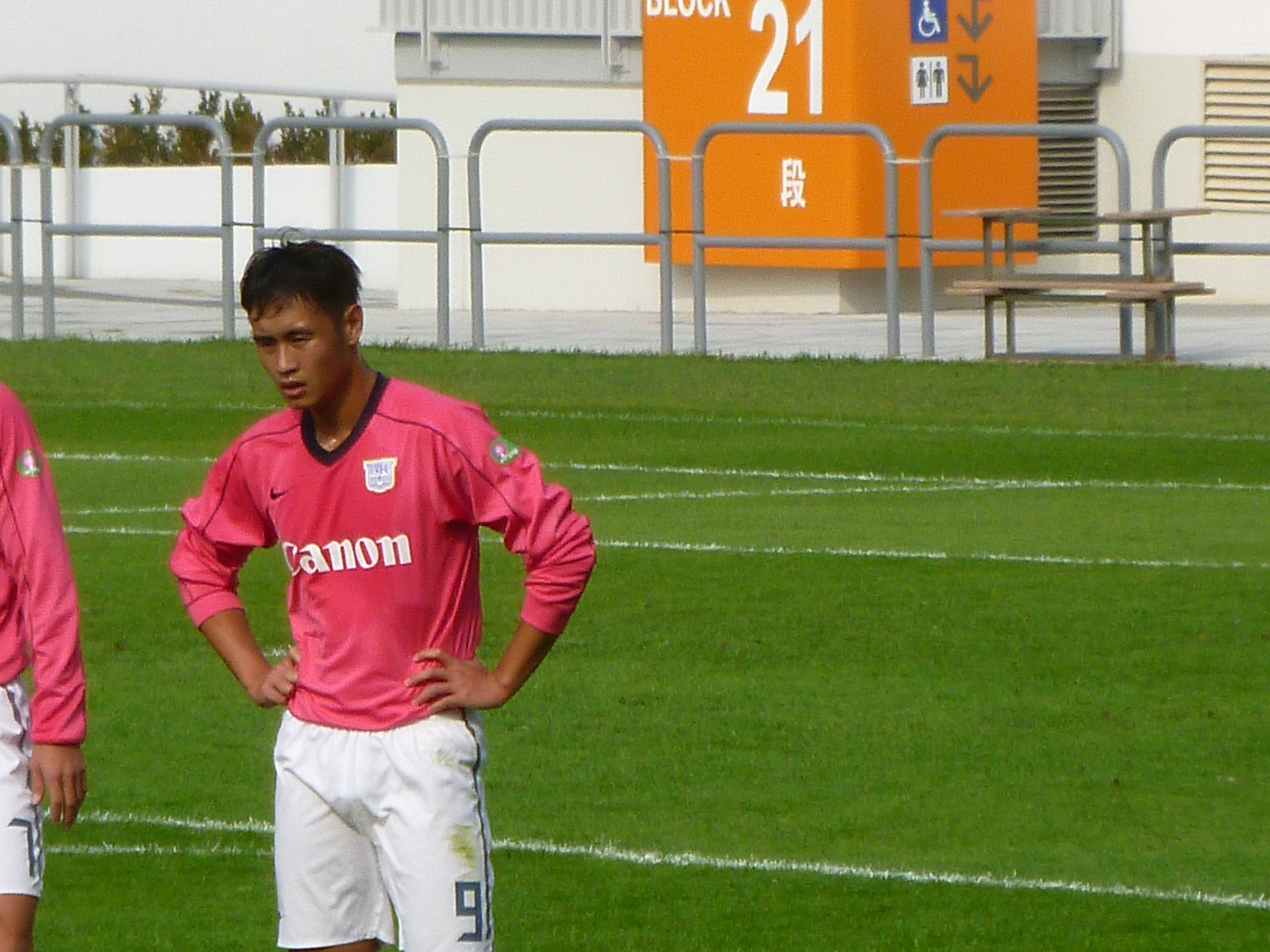

Personal information
- Full name: Liang Zicheng
- Date of birth: 18 March 1982 (age 44)
- Place of birth: Guangzhou, China
- Height: 1.73 m (5 ft 8 in)
- Positions: Striker; winger

Senior career*
Years	Team	Apps	(Gls)
2002–2006	Guangzhou FC	16	(1)
2003–2004	→ Xiangxue Pharmaceutical (loan)	7	(0)
2006–2009	South China	6	(1)
2007–2008	→ Hong Kong Rangers (loan)	16	(4)
2009	Fourway Rangers	8	(1)
2009–2013	Kitchee	42	(7)
2013	→ Sun Hei (loan)	8	(1)
2013–2014	Yokohama FC Hong Kong	8	(1)
2014–2015	Eastern	20	(4)
2015–2016	South China	14	(2)
2016	Southern	5	(2)
2017	R&F	10	(0)
2026–	Fu Moon	1	(0)
- * Club domestic league appearances and goals as of 16 May 2026

Liang Zicheng (Chinese: 梁子成, born 18 March 1982) is a Chinese former professional footballer who played as a striker.

== Career statistics ==
=== Club ===
Updated 20 September 2008

Club	Season	League		Senior Shield		League Cup		FA Cup		AFC Cup		Total	
Club	Season	Apps	Goals	Apps	Goals	Apps	Goals	Apps	Goals	Apps	Goals	Apps	Goals
South China	2006–07	1 (0)	0	0 (0)	0	2 (1)	0	0 (1)	0	N/A	N/A	3 (2)	0
South China	2008–09	3 (2)	1	0 (0)	0	1 (0)	0	0 (0)	0	1 (1)	0	5 (3)	1
South China	All	4 (2)	1	0 (0)	0	3 (1)	0	0 (1)	0	1 (1)	0	8 (5)	1
Bulova Rangers	2007–08	10 (3)	4	1 (0)	0	4 (0)	1	0 (0)	0	N/A	N/A	15 (3)	5
Bulova Rangers	All	10 (3)	4	1 (0)	0	4 (0)	1	0 (0)	0	0 (0)	0	15 (3)	5
Fourway Rangers	2009–10	5 (2)	2	0 (0)	0	0 (0)	0	0 (0)	0	N/A	N/A	5 (2)	2
Fourway Rangers	All	5 (2)	2	0 (0)	0	0 (0)	0	0 (0)	0	N/A	N/A	5 (2)	2
