= Kot Cho Wai =

Hong Kong footballer (born 1991)

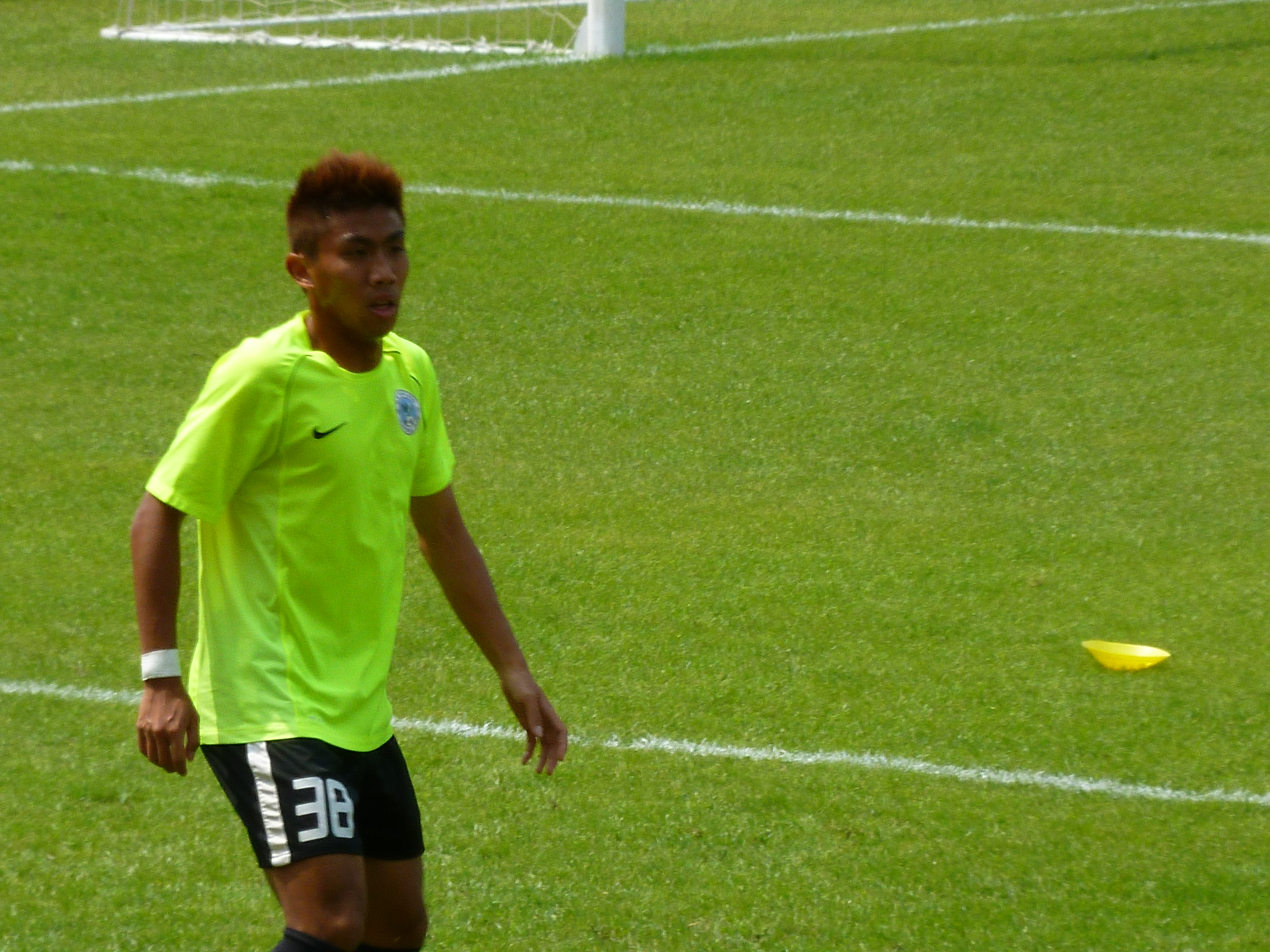

Personal information
- Full name: Kot Cho Wai
- Date of birth: 16 December 1991 (age 34)
- Place of birth: Hong Kong
- Height: 1.68 m (5 ft 6 in)
- Positions: Centre midfielder; right midfielder

Team information
- Current team: North District

Youth career
- 2009–2011: South China

Senior career*
Years	Team	Apps	(Gls)
2011–2012	South China	0	(0)
2011–2012	→ Hong Kong Sapling (loan)	16	(0)
2012–2014	Sun Hei	18	(2)
2014	Mutual		
2019–2021	North District	14	(4)
2021–2022	Mutual	8	(2)
2022	North District		
2022–	Hoi King	68	(14)
- * Club domestic league appearances and goals as of 16 May 2026

Kot Cho Wai
- Traditional Chinese: 葛祖威
Transcriptions
Standard Mandarin
- Hanyu Pinyin: Ge Zuwei
Yue: Cantonese
- Jyutping: got^{3} zou^{2} wai^{1}

Kot Cho Wai (Chinese: 葛祖威 (born 16 December 1991 in Hong Kong) is a former Hong Kong professional footballer. He played as a centre midfielder or a right midfielder.

== Club career ==
=== South China ===
In July 2011, Kot was promoted from the reserve to the first team. He will wear number 20 in the 2011–12 season.

In August 2011, he was being loaned to a newly formed club Hong Kong Sapling.

=== Hong Kong Sapling ===
Kot made his senior career debut on 11 September 2011 in the away match against Tai Po, which Hong Kong Sapling lost 0–3. He was a used substitute for the first 4 league games, and his performance impressed head coach Paul Foster. He was one of the usual starting XI for Hong Kong Sapling, although he was usually being substituted in the second half of the matches. On 16 February 2012, he received his first red card in Hong Kong First Division League in a match against South China. He made 16 league appearances in total.

=== Sun Hei ===
Kot joins Sun Hei in the 2012–13 season for an undisclosed fee.

== Career statistics ==
=== Club ===
As of 23 February 2013

Club	Season	League		Senior Shield		League Cup		FA Cup		AFC Cup		Total	
Club	Season	Apps	Goals	Apps	Goals	Apps	Goals	Apps	Goals	Apps	Goals	Apps	Goals
Hong Kong Sapling (loan)	2011–12	16	0	2	0	1	0	2	0	N/A	N/A	21	0
Hong Kong Sapling Total		16	0	2	0	1	0	2	0	0	0	21	0
JC Sun Hei	2012–13	7	1	0	0	0	0	0	0	0	0	7	1
Sun Hei Total		7	1	0	0	0	0	0	0	0	0	7	1
Total		23	1	2	0	1	0	2	0	N/A	N/A	28	1
