= José María (footballer, born 1982) =

Spanish footballer

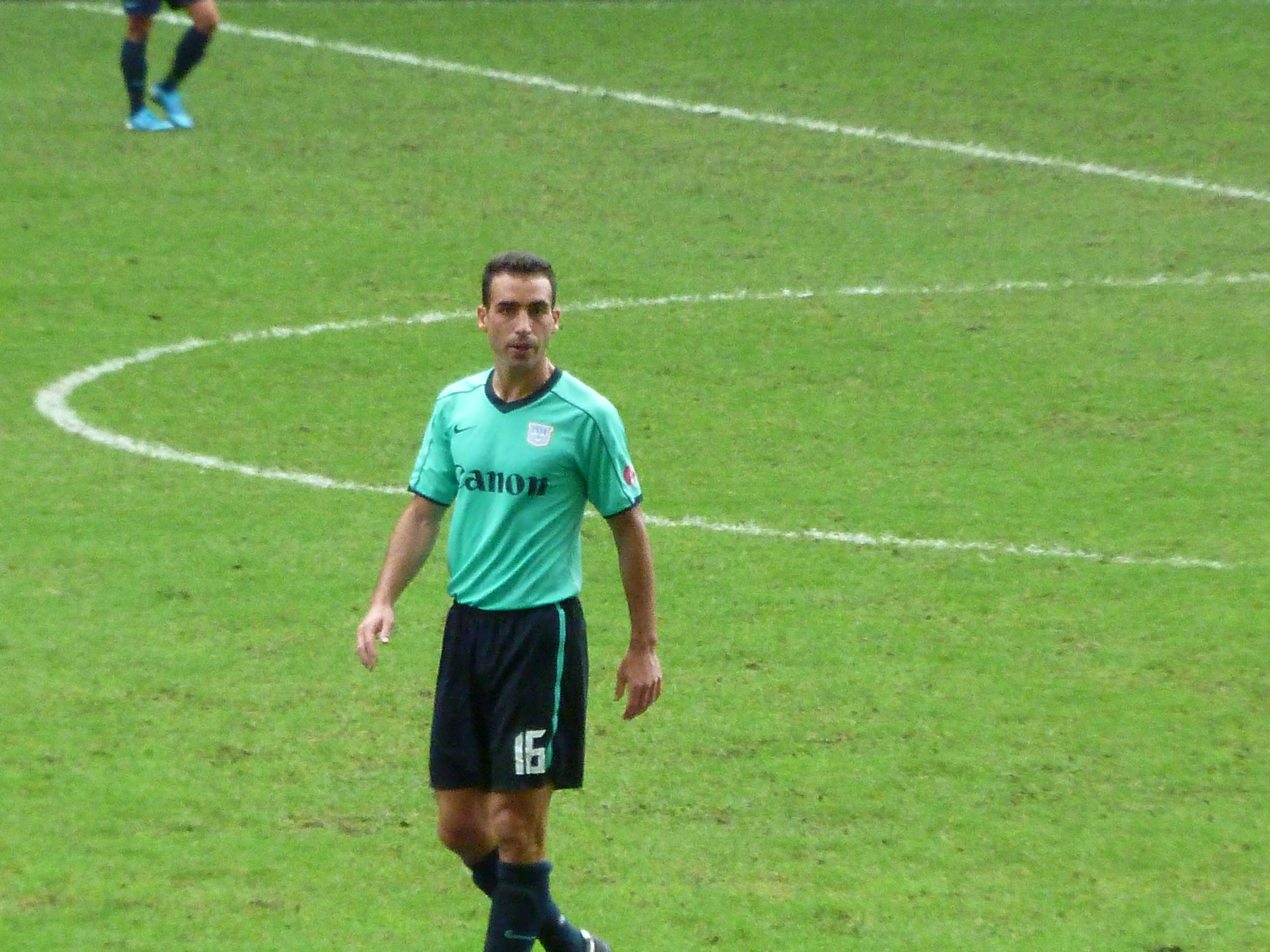

Personal information
- Full name: José María Díaz Muñoz
- Date of birth: 4 July 1982 (age 44)
- Place of birth: Murcia, Spain
- Height: 1.80 m (5 ft 11 in)
- Position: Defensive midfielder

Senior career*
Years	Team	Apps	(Gls)
2000–2007	Real Murcia	26	(2)
2000–2007	Real Murcia B	101	(13)
2002–2003	→ Gimnàstic (loan)	11	(0)
2006	→ Burgos (loan)	4	(0)
2007–2008	Fuenlabrada	18	(0)
2008	Talavera	12	(2)
2008–2009	Binefar	11	(2)
2009–2010	Hollywood United	12	(1)
2010–2011	Costa Cálida	11	(1)
2011	Kitchee	8	(2)
2011–2012	UCAM Murcia	11	(2)
2012	Kitchee	9	(1)
2012–2013	Sunray Cave JC Sun Hei	13	(3)
2013	Roi Et United	10	(3)
2014	Southern District	10	(3)
2014–2015	Yokohama FC Hong Kong	9	(1)
2015–2016	Southern	15	(4)
2016	Biu Chun Glory Sky	6	(0)
- * Club domestic league appearances and goals as of 28 February 2017

José María Díaz Muñoz (born 4 July 1982) is a Spanish former professional footballer.

== Club career ==
José María joined Hong Kong First Division League side Kitchee in January 2011.
