= 2013–14 Tuen Mun SA season =

Tuen Mun
2013–14 season
- President: Chan Keung
- Head Coach: Yan Lik Kin (Acting)
- Home Ground: Tuen Mun Tang Shiu Kin Sports Ground (Capacity: 2,200)
- First Division: 10th (alphabetically)
- Senior Shield: TBD
- FA Cup: TBD
Home colours	Away colours

The 2013–14 season is Tuen Mun's 4th consecutive season in the Hong Kong First Division League, the top flight of Hong Kong football. Tuen Mun will compete in the First Division League, Senior Challenge Shield and FA Cup in this season. However, it is yet to confirmed whether they will compete in the 2014 AFC Cup as they reached the 2013 Hong Kong AFC Cup play-offs final against Kitchee.

Tuen Mun failed to qualify for their first ever Asian club competition as they lost 3–0 to Kitchee in the 2013 Hong Kong AFC Cup play-offs final.

== Key events ==
- 29 May 2013: The club confirmed that they have agreed deals with new sponsor for the next season. All foreign players are forced to leave as the club do not extend their contracts.
- 29 May 2013: Hong Kong midfielder Chow Cheuk Fung joins fellow First Division club Biu Chun Rangers on loan until the end of the season.
- 29 May 2013: The club confirms that Li Haiqiang and Kwok Wing Sun will leave the club after spending a season with the club.
- 30 May 2013: The club confirms the departure of head coach Yan Lik Kin.
- 4 June 2013: Hong Kong defender Cheng Ting Chi announces his retirement from professional football.
- 11 June 2013: Brazilian midfielder Diego Eli Moreira leaves the club and joins newly promoted First Division club Eastern Salon for free.
- 11 June 2013: Chinese-born Hongkonger midfielder Li Haiqiang leaves the club and joins newly promoted First Division club Eastern Salon for free.
- 11 June 2013: Brazilian defender Beto leaves the club and joins newly promoted First Division club Eastern Salon for free.
- 11 June 2013: Hong Kong defender Kwok Wing Sun leaves the club and joins newly promoted First Division club Eastern Salon for an undisclosed fee.
- 4 July 2013: The club announces that 12 players will stay at the club, and is finding 4 Chinese players and 3 foreign players to strengthen the squad.
- 18 July 2013: Chinese midfielder Hu Jun joins the club on loan from Chinese Super League club Qingdao Jonoon until the end of the season.
- 18 July 2013: Chinese midfielder Feng Tao joins the club from Chinese non-league club Jiaozhou Anji Tower for an undisclosed fee.
- 18 July 2013: Hong Kong defender Tsang Chiu Tat joins the club from fellow First Division club Royal Southern on a free transfer.
- 22 August 2013: Unattached Croatian defender Petar Garvic joins the club on a free transfer.
- 22 August 2013: Spanish striker Dani Sánchez joins the club from A-League club Wellington Phoenix FC on a free transfer.
- 22 August 2013: Cameroonian striker Guy Madjo joins the club from English Conference Premier club Macclesfield Town on a free transfer.
- 22 August 2013: Chinese defender Zheng Meng joins the club from Qingdao City Super League club Qingdao Kunpeng on a free transfer.
- 13 November 2013: Chinese defender Yin Guangjun joins the club from on loan from Chinese Super League club Qingdao Jonoon until the end of the season.
- 1 January 2014: Hong Kong defender Wong Chi Chung leaves the club and joins fellow First Division club Eastern Salon for an undisclosed fee.

== Players ==
=== Squad information ===
N	P	Nat.	Name	Date of birth	Age	Since	Previous club	Notes
1	GK	(Hong Kong)	Siu Leong^{LP}	22 January 1987	27	2009	(Hong Kong) Tuen Mun Progoal	Second nationality: China
4	MF	(China)	Feng Tao^{FP}	5 April 1985	29	2013	(China) Jiaozhou Anji Tower	
5	DF	(Croatia)	Petar Garvic^{FP}	21 October 1986	27	2013	Free agent	
6	DF	(China)	Xie Silida^{LP}	19 June 1990	23	2010	(China) Yunnan Hongta	Second nationality: Hong Kong
7	MF	(Hong Kong)	Ling Cong^{LP}	28 February 1985	29	2011	(Hong Kong) Sun Hei	Second nationality: China
8	MF	(China)	Hu Jun^{FP}	24 January 1985	29	2013	(China) Qingdao Jonoon	
9	FW	(Cameroon)	Guy Madjo^{FP}	1 June 1984	30	2013	(England) Macclesfield Town	
10	FW	(Spain)	Dani Sánchez^{FP}	10 November 1984	29	2013	(Australia) Wellington Phoenix	
11	MF	(Hong Kong)	Yip Tsz Chun^{LP}	15 May 1985	29	2011	(Hong Kong) Tai Chung	Club captain
13	GK	(Hong Kong)	Wei Zhao^{LP}	29 August 1983	30	2012	(Hong Kong) Biu Chun Rangers	Second nationality: China
14	DF	(Hong Kong)	Law Ka Lok^{LP}	20 March 1979	35	2006	Free agent	
16	MF	(Hong Kong)	Lai Yiu Cheong^{LP}	25 September 1988	25	2012	(Hong Kong) TSW Pegasus	
17	DF	(Hong Kong)	Tsang Chiu Tat^{LP}	3 February 1989	25	2013	(Hong Kong) Royal Southern	
19	GK	(Hong Kong)	Luk Ping Chung^{LP}	7 May 1993	21	2010	Youth system	
20	MF	(Hong Kong)	Chan Pak Hei^{LP}	26 March 1997	17	2013	Youth system	
24	MF	(Hong Kong)	Li Chi Sing^{LP}	9 March 1990	24	2013	Youth system	
26	FW	(China)	Yuan Yang^{LP}	12 December 1985	28	2013	(Hong Kong) Sun Pegasus	On loan from Sun Pegasus; Second nationality: Hong Kong
27	DF	(China)	Yin Guangjun^{FP}	22 October 1992	21	2013	(China) Qiandao Jonoon	
29	DF	(China)	Li Ming^{LP}	29 February 1984	30	2012	(Hong Kong) Sunray Cave JC Sun Hei	Second nationality: Hong Kong
30	DF	(China)	Zheng Meng^{FP}	17 February 1983	31	2013	(China) Qingdao Kunpeng	
	FW	(Hong Kong)	Chao Pengfei^{NR}	11 July 1987	26	2012	(Hong Kong) Biu Chun Rangers	On loan to Happy Valley; Second nationality: China
	MF	(Hong Kong)	Chow Cheuk Fung^{NR}	1 August 1989	24	2006	(Hong Kong) Buler Rangers	On loan to Biu Chun Rangers
	MF		Claudio Cito	24 January 1991	22	2013	Free Agent	

Last update: 1 January 2014
Source: Tuen Mun SA
Ordered by squad number.
^{LP}Local player; ^{FP}Foreign player; ^{NR}Non-registered player

=== Transfers ===
==== In ====
#	Position	Player	Transferred from	Fee	Date	Team	Source
4	MF	(China) Feng Tao	(China) Jiaozhou Anji Tower	Undisclosed	17 July 2013	First team	
5	DF	(Croatia) Petar Garvic	Free agent	Free transfer	22 August 2013	First team	
10	FW	(Spain) Dani Sánchez	(Australia) Wellington Phoenix	Free transfer	22 August 2013	First team	
9	FW	(Cameroon) Guy Madjo	(England) Macclesfield Town	Free transfer	22 August 2013	First team	
30	FW	(China) Zheng Meng	(China) Qingdao Kunpeng	Free transfer	22 August 2013	First team	

==== Out ====
#	Position	Player	Transferred to	Fee	Date	Team	Source
3	MF	(Brazil) Diego Eli Moreira	(Hong Kong) Eastern Salon	Free transfer	11 June 2013	First team	
22	MF	(Hong Kong) Li Haiqiang	(Hong Kong) Eastern Salon	Free transfer	11 June 2013	First team	
15	DF	(Brazil) Beto	(Hong Kong) Eastern Salon	Free transfer	11 June 2013	First team	
2	DF	(Hong Kong) Kwok Wing Sun	(Hong Kong) Eastern Salon	Undisclosed	11 June 2013	First team	
27	MF	(Hong Kong) Cheung Chi Fung	(Hong Kong) Tai Chung	Free transfer	31 August 2013	First team	

==== Loan In ====
#	Position	Player	Loaned from	Date	Loan expires	Team	Source
8	MF	(China) Hu Jun	(China) Qingdao Jonoon	17 July 2013	30 June 2014	First team	
27	DF	(China) Yin Guangjun	(China) Qingdao Jonoon	13 November 2013	30 June 2014	First team	

==== Loan out ====
#	Position	Player	Loaned to	Date	Loan expires	Team	Source
8	MF	(Hong Kong) Chow Cheuk Fung	(Hong Kong) Biu Chun Rangers	29 May 2013	End of the season	First team	
20	FW	(Hong Kong) Chao Pengfei	(Hong Kong) Tuen Mun	28 September 2013	End of the season	First team	

== Club ==
=== Coaching staff ===
Position	Staff
Head Coach	(Hong Kong) Yan Lik Kin
Assistant Coach	(Hong Kong) Poon Man Chun
Assistant Coach	(Hong Kong) Ho Kei Nun
Goalkeeper Coach	(Hong Kong) Leung Cheuk Cheung
Technical Director	(Democratic Republic of the Congo) Zola Kiniambi

Last updated: 18 July 2013
Source: Tuen Mun SA

== Squad statistics ==
=== Overall Stats ===
	First Division	Senior Shield	FA Cup	Total Stats
Games played	0	0	0	0
Games won	0	0	0	0
Games drawn	0	0	0	0
Games lost	0	0	0	0
Goals for	0	0	0	0
Goals against	0	0	0	0
Players used	0	0	0	0^{1}
Yellow cards	0	0	0	0
Red cards	0	0	0	0

Last updated: 24 May 2013
Source: Player Stats

Players Used: Tuen Mun have used a total of 0 different players in all competitions.

=== Squad Stats ===
				Total				Hong Kong First Division League		Senior Challenge Shield		FA Cup		
N	Pos.	Name	Nat.	GS	App	Gls	Min	App	Gls	App	Gls	App	Gls	Notes
1	GK	Siu Leong	(Hong Kong)											(−) GA
13	GK	Wei Zhao	(Hong Kong)											(−) GA
19	GK	Luk Ping Chung	(Hong Kong)											(−) GA
5	DF	Petar Garvic	(Croatia)											
6	DF	Xie Silida	(Hong Kong)											
14	DF	Law Ka Lok	(Hong Kong)											
17	DF	Tsang Chiu Tat	(Hong Kong)											
27	DF	Yin Guangjun	(China)											
28	DF	Wong Chi Chung	(Hong Kong)											
29	DF	Li Ming	(China)											
30	DF	Zheng Meng	(China)											
4	MF	Feng Tao	(China)											
7	MF	Ling Cong	(Hong Kong)											
8	MF	Hu Jun	(China)											
11	MF	Yip Tsz Chun	(Hong Kong)											
16	MF	Lai Yiu Cheong	(Hong Kong)											
20	MF	Chan Pak Hei	(Hong Kong)											
24	MF	Li Chi Shing	(Hong Kong)											
9	FW	Guy Madjo	(Cameroon)											
10	FW	Dani Sánchez	(Spain)											
26	FW	Yuan Yang	(China)											
	FW	Chao Pengfei	(Hong Kong)											

Last updated: 15 December 2013
Ordered by Position
0 shown as blank

=== Top scorers ===
Place	Position	Nationality	Number	Name	First Division	Senior Shield	FA Cup	Total
TOTALS					0	0	0	0

=== Disciplinary record ===
Number	Nationality	Position	Name	First Division		Senior Shield		FA Cup		Total	
Number	Nationality	Position	Name	Booked	Sent off (straight red)	Booked	Sent off (straight red)	Booked	Sent off (straight red)	Booked	Sent off (straight red)
TOTALS				0	0	0	0	0	0	0	0

=== Starting 11 ===
This will show the most used players in each position, based on Tuen Mun's typical starting formation once the season commences.

=== Captains ===
No.	P	Name	Country	No. games	Notes
11	FW	Yip Tsz Chun	(Hong Kong)	1	Team captain

Last updated: 15 October 2013
Source: Competitive match reports.
Competitive matches only
Matches started as captain only
Country: FIFA nationality; No.: Squad number; P: Position; Name: Player name; No. Games: Number of games started as captain.

== Competitions ==
=== Overall ===
Competition	Started round	Current position / round	Final position / round	First match	Last match
Hong Kong First Division League	—	10th		September 2013	
Senior Challenge Shield	Quarter-finals	—		October 2013	
FA Cup	Quarter-finals	—		January 2014	

Updated to match played 25 May 2013
Source: Competitions

=== First Division League ===
==== Classification ====
Pos	Team	Pld	W	D	L	GF	GA	GD	Pts	Qualification or relegation
8	Sunray Cave JC Sun Hei (R)	18	5	4	9	32	41	−9	19	Relegation to 2014–15 Hong Kong First Division League (Note: Sunray Cave JC Sun Hei & Citizen declined to participate in the 2014–15 Hong Kong Premier League and would self-relegate in the following season.)
9	Citizen (R)	18	4	6	8	25	33	−8	18	Relegation to 2014–15 Hong Kong First Division League
10	Yokohama FC Hong Kong	18	3	4	11	25	39	−14	13	
11	Happy Valley (D, R)	0	0	0	0	0	0	0	0	Excluded, record expunged Relegation to 2014–15 Hong Kong First Division League (Note: On 13 February 2014, the HKFA announced that as a result of a match-fixing investigation, both Tuen Mun and Happy Valley would be excluded from the league, and their records would be expunged.)
12	Tuen Mun (D, R)	0	0	0	0	0	0	0	0	Excluded, record expunged Relegation to 2014–15 Hong Kong First Division League

Updated to match(es) played on 11 May 2014. Source: Hong Kong Football Association
Rules for classification: 1) points; 2) head-to-head points; 3) head-to-head goal difference; 4) head-to-head goals scored; 5) goal difference; 6) number of goals scored.
(D) Disqualified; (R) Relegated

==== Results summary ====
Overall								Home						Away					
Pld	W	D	L	GF	GA	GD	Pts	W	D	L	GF	GA	GD	W	D	L	GF	GA	GD
3	1	1	1	3	3	0	4	1	0	0	1	0	+1	0	1	1	2	3	−1

Last updated: 15 October 2013.
Source: First Division

==== Results by round ====
Round	1	2	3	4	5	6	7	8	9	10	11	12	13	14	15	16	17	18	19	20	21	22
Ground	A	H	H	A	A	H	A	H	A	H	A	H	H	A	H	H	H	A	H	A	A	A
Result	L	W																				
Position	10	7																				

Updated to match(es) played on 29 September 2013. Source: Competitive Matches
A = Away; H = Home; W = Win; D = Draw; L = Loss

== Matches ==
Win Draw Loss Void

=== Pre-season friendlies ===
26 July 2013	Tuen Mun (Hong Kong)	4 – 1	(Hong Kong) Biu Chun Rangers	Hong Kong

1 August 2013	Sunray Cave JC Sun Hei (Hong Kong)	1 – 2	(Hong Kong) Tuen Mun	Shek Kip Mei, Kowloon
	Goal		Ling Cong; Hu Jun	Stadium: Shek Kip Mei Park

6 August 2013	Guangdong Sunray Cave Reserves (China)	3 – 0	(Hong Kong) Tuen Mun	Guangzhou, China PR
	Xiao Yifeng; Li Jian; Yu Jianfeng			Stadium: Guangdong Olympic Stadium

8 August 2013	Shenzhen Ruby (China)	1 – 0	(Hong Kong) Tuen Mun	Shenzhen, China PR
	Goal			Stadium: Sanshui Football Training Base

9 August 2013	Guangzhou Evergrande B (China)	1 – 2	(Hong Kong) Tuen Mun	Guangzhou, China PR
	Goal		Goal	Stadium: Sanshui Football Training Base

11 August 2013	Tuen Mun (China)	1 – 2	(Hong Kong) Citizen	Guangzhou, China PR
				Stadium: Sanshui Football Training Base

13 August 2013	Tuen Mun (China)	–	(Hong Kong) Eastern Salon	Guangzhou, China PR

14 August 2013	Tuen Mun (China)	–	(Hong Kong) Happy Valley	Guangzhou, China PR
				Stadium: Sanshui Football Training Base

August 2013	Yokohama FC Hong Kong	v	(Hong Kong) Tuen Mun	Guangzhou, China PR
TBA				Stadium: Sanshui Football Training Base

=== First Division League ===
1 September 2013 Round 1	Eastern Salon	2 – 1	Tuen Mun	Tsuen Wan, New Territories
14:30 UTC+8	Itaparica 16', 45+2'; Leung Kwok Wai (yellow card) 68'; Leung Chi Wing (yellow card) 83'; Lau Nim Yat (yellow card) 87'	Report		Stadium: Shing Mun Valley Sports Ground (Capacity: 5,000); Attendance: 1,154; Referee: Cheng Oi Cho; Assistant referees: Lam Chi Ho, Yau Ho Fai; Fourth official: Lui Siu Chuen

15 September 2013 Round 2	Tuen Mun	1 – 0	Happy Valley	Tuen Mun, New Territories
14:30 UTC+8	Li Ming (yellow card) 11'; Zheng Meng (yellow card) 62'; Madjo 90'	Report	(yellow card) 55' Yeung Chi Lun; (yellow card) 60' Lau Ka Shing	Stadium: Tuen Mun Tang Shiu Kin Sports Ground (Capacity: 2,200); Attendance: 471; Referee: Ho Wai Sing; Assistant referees: Lui Siu Chuen, Yu Chun Sun; Fourth official: Tang Hing Fu

22 September 2013 Round 3	Tuen Mun	P − P	I-Sky Yuen Long	Tuen Mun, New Territories
14:30 UTC+8				Stadium: Tuen Mun Tang Shiu Kin Sports Ground (Capacity: 2,200)

29 September 2013 Round 4	Biu Chun Rangers	1 − 1	Tuen Mun	Sham Shui Po, Kowloon
14:30 UTC+8	Luciano 14'; Chan Ming Kong (yellow card) 45+3'; Liu Songwei (yellow card) 46'; Law Hiu Chung (yellow card) 90'	Report	40' Sanchez	Stadium: Sham Shui Po Sports Ground (Capacity: 2,194); Attendance: 245; Referee: Tong Kui Sum; Assistant referees: Chan Shui Hung, Lam Nai Kei; Fourth official: Tang Hing Fu

6 October 2013 Round 5	Royal Southern	P – P	Tuen Mun	Aberdeen, Hong Kong Island
14:30 UTC+8				Stadium: Aberdeen Sports Ground (Capacity: 4,000)

19 October 2013 Round 6	Tuen Mun	1 – 4	Citizen	Tuen Mun, New Territories
14:30 UTC+8	Siu Leong (yellow card) 68'; Law Ka Lok (yellow card) 77'; Madjo 78'	Report	41' Sham Kwok Keung; 57' Nakamura; 69' (pen.) Krasić; 73' Fernando	Stadium: Tuen Mun Tang Shiu Kin Sports Ground (Capacity: 2,200); Attendance: 462; Referee: Lui Siu Chuen; Assistant referees: Chan Shiu Hung, Tang Hing Fu; Fourth official: Yu Chun Sun

26 October 2013 Round 7	Sun Pegasus	6 – 0	Tuen Mun	Mong Kok, Kowloon
14:30 UTC+8	Raščić 12', 34', 53' (yellow card) 37'; Lo Chun Kit (yellow card) 28'; McKee 79'; Ju Yingzhi 86'	Report	(yellow card) 4' Li Ming; (yellow card) 8' Sánchez; (yellow card) 57' Hu Jun	Stadium: Mong Kok Stadium (Capacity: 6,680); Attendance: 1,443; Referee: Liu Kwok Man; Assistant referees: Lam Nai Kei, Lam Chi Ho; Fourth official: Yu Kin Fung

30 November 2013 Round 8	Tuen Mun	0 – 5	Kitchee	Tuen Mun, New Territories
14:30 UTC+8	Garvic (yellow card) 21'; Yin Guangjun (yellow card) 44'; Feng Tao (yellow card) 53'	Report	17' Annan; 21' (pen.) Belencoso; 25' Matt Lam; (yellow card) 44' Alex	Stadium: Tuen Mun Tang Shiu Kin Sports Ground (Capacity: 2,200); Attendance: 599; Referee: Ho Wai Sing; Assistant referees: Yau Ho Fai, Sarao Amarjit Singh; Fourth official: Luk Kin Sun

15 December 2013 Round 9	South China	1 – 0	Tuen Mun	So Kon Po, Hong Kong Island
17:30 UTC+8	Lee Chi Ho 58' (yellow card) 80'	Report	(yellow card) 62' Tsang Chiu Tat; (yellow card) 69' Feng Tao	Stadium: Hong Kong Stadium (Capacity: 40,000); Attendance: 669; Referee: Tong Kui Sum; Assistant referees: Cheng Oi Cho, Tang Hing Fu; Fourth official: Law Bik Chi

22 December 2013 Round 10	Tuen Mun	v	Yokohama FC Hong Kong	Tuen Mun, New Territories
14:30 UTC+8				Stadium: Tuen Mun Tang Shiu Kin Sports Ground (Capacity: 2,200)

26 January 2014 Round 11	Sunray Cave JC Sun Hei	v	Tuen Mun	Tsing Yi, New Territories
17:30 UTC+8				Stadium: Tsing Yi Sports Ground (Capacity: 1,500)

8 February 2014 Round 12	Tuen Mun	v	Sunray Cave JC Sun Hei	Tuen Mun, New Territories
14:30 UTC+8				Stadium: Tuen Mun Tang Shiu Kin Sports Ground (Capacity: 2,200)

16 February 2014 Round 13	Tuen Mun	v	Sun Pegasus	Tuen Mun, New Territories
14:30 UTC+8				Stadium: Tuen Mun Tang Shiu Kin Sports Ground (Capacity: 2,200)

23 February 2014 Round 14	Happy Valley	v	Tuen Mun	Tai Po, New Territories
14:30 UTC+8				Stadium: Tai Po Sports Ground (Capacity: 3,000)

8 March 2014 Round 15	Tuen Mun	v	Royal Southern	Tuen Mun, New Territories
14:30 UTC+8				Stadium: Tuen Mun Tang Shiu Kin Sports Ground (Capacity: 2,200)

16 March 2014 Round 16	Tuen Mun	v	Biu Chun Rangers	Tuen Mun, New Territories
14:30 UTC+8				Stadium: Tuen Mun Tang Shiu Kin Sports Ground (Capacity: 2,200)

22 March 2014 Round 17	Tuen Mun	v	South China	Tuen Mun, New Territories
14:30 UTC+8				Stadium: Tuen Mun Tang Shiu Kin Sports Ground (Capacity: 2,200)

29 March 2014 Round 18	Kitchee	v	Tuen Mun	Mong Kok, Kowloon
17:30 UTC+8				Stadium: Mong Kok Stadium (Capacity: 6,680)

5 April 2014 Round 19	Tuen Mun	v	Eastern Salon	Tuen Mun, New Territories
14:30 UTC+8				Stadium: Tuen Mun Tang Shiu Kin Sports Ground (Capacity: 2,200)

18 April 2014 Round 20	I-Sky Yuen Long	v	Tuen Mun	Yuen Long, New Territories
14:30 UTC+8				Stadium: Yuen Long Stadium (Capacity: 4,932)

4 May 2014 Round 21	Yokohama FC Hong Kong	v	Tuen Mun	Tseung Kwan O, New Territories
14:30 UTC+8				Stadium: Tseung Kwan O Sports Ground (Capacity: 3,500)

10–11 May 2014 Round 22	Citizen	v	Tuen Mun	Tsing Yi, New Territories
TBC				Stadium: Tsing Yi Sports Ground (Capacity: 1,500)

=== Senior Shield ===
2 November 2013 1st Round	Sunray Cave JC Sun Hei	v	Tuen Mun	Mong Kok, Kowloon
14:30 UTC+8				Stadium: Mong Kok Stadium (Capacity: 6,680)
