= 2013–14 Hong Kong First Division League =

HKFA RedMR First Division League
- Season: 2013–14
- Champions: Kitchee
- AFC Champions League: Kitchee
- AFC Cup: South China
- Matches: 107
- Goals: 377 (3.52 per match)
- Top goalscorer: Juan Belencoso (Kitchee) (11 goals)
- Biggest home win: Kitchee 6–2 Sunray Cave JC Sun Hei (3 September 2013)
- Biggest away win: Citizen 1–4 South China (18 January 2014)
- Highest scoring: Kitchee 6–2 Sunray Cave JC Sun Hei (3 September 2013); Sun Pegasus 5–3 South China (14 September 2013)
- Longest winning run: 5 games Kitchee
- Longest unbeaten run: 8 games Kitchee
- Longest winless run: 2 games Citizen; Happy Valley; Sunray Cave JC Sun Hei; Yokohama FC Hong Kong
- Longest losing run: 2 games Happy Valley
- Highest attendance: 3,200; Sun Pegasus 5–3 South China; Mong Kok Stadium (Week 2)
- Lowest attendance: 142; Citizen 3–4 Sunray Cave JC Sun Hei; Tsing Yi Sports Ground (Week 14)
- Total attendance: 74,165 (Excluding voided matches); 86,651(Including voided matches)
- Average attendance: 975 (Excluding voided matches); 931 (Including voided matches)

The 2013–14 Hong Kong First Division League, officially named 2013–14 HKFA RedMR Hong Kong First Division League due to sponsorship reasons, is the 102nd season of the First Division League since its establishment. It will be a transition season before the new Premier League gets under way in autumn 2014. Therefore, this is also the last ever First Division that is the top division in the Hong Kong football league system.

South China are the defending champions, having won the First Division title in the previous season.

The season will start on 30 August 2013. League fixtures were announced on 14 August 2013.

On 11 February 2014, the Hong Kong Football Association concluded that Tuen Mun and Happy Valley failed to provide evidence to demonstrate that they are viable football clubs in terms of governance arrangements and financial sustainability. All of their remaining matches are suspended for the remainder of the season. Two days later, the HKFA announced that the results of all of the matches played by the two clubs this season will not be included in the league table. Goals scored in the matches will not be counted. However, where the matches have involved disciplinary sanctions, i.e. yellow cards and red cards, etc., these will remain on record. Furthermore, HKFA has confirmed that none of the remaining 10 teams playing matches in the 1st Division will be relegated at the end of the 2013/14 season in the same report.

On 5 April 2014, Kitchee secured their sixth First Division title after they beat Sunray Cave JC Sun Hei and South China failed to take a win from Royal Southern.

== Teams ==
A total of 12 teams will contest the league, including nine sides from the 2012–13 season and three promoted from the 2012–13 Hong Kong Second Division League.

Locations of the Hong Kong First Division League 2013–14 teams

=== Stadia and locations ===
Note: Table lists in alphabetical order.

Team	Stadium	Location	Capacity
Rangers	Sham Shui Po Sports Ground	Sham Shui Po	2,194
Citizen	Tsing Yi Sports Ground	Tsing Yi	1,500
Eastern	Shing Mun Valley Sports Ground	Tsuen Wan	5,000
Happy Valley	Siu Sai Wan Sports Ground; Tai Po Sports Ground^{1}	Siu Sai Wan; Tai Po	12,000; 3,000
Yuen Long	Yuen Long Stadium	Yuen Long	4,932
Kitchee	Mong Kok Stadium	Mong Kok	6,680
Southern	Aberdeen Sports Ground	Aberdeen	4,000^{2}
South China	Hong Kong Stadium	Causeway Bay	40,000
Sun Hei	Tsing Yi Sports Ground	Tsing Yi	1,500
Sun Pegasus	Mong Kok Stadium	Mong Kok	6,680
Tuen Mun	Tuen Mun Tang Shiu Kin Sports Ground	Tuen Mun	2,200
Yokohama FC (HK)	Tseung Kwan O Sports Ground	Tseung Kwan O	3,500^{3}

Remarks :
^{1} As Siu Sai Wan Sports Ground will undergo renovation during the season, it will not be used for football matches within the construction period. Home matches of Happy Valley during the period will be played at Tai Po Sports Ground.
^{2} The capacity of Aberdeen Sports Ground is 9,000, but only the 4,000-seater main stand is opened for football matches.
^{3} The capacity of Tseung Kwan O Sports Ground is 3,500, but it can be expended to 5,000 if the temporary stand is opened.

=== Personnel and kits ===
Team	Chairman	Head coach	Captain	Kitmaker	Shirt sponsor
Rangers	Mok Yiu Keung	José Ricardo Rambo	Leung Hing Kit	Xtep	Lee & Man Paper
Citizen	Pui Kwan Kay	Chu Kwok Kuen	Festus Baise	Jako	Rasonic
Eastern	Lam Kin Ming	Cristiano Cordeiro	Wong Chun Yue	Adidas	ECSAF
Happy Valley	Kwong Hiu Ming	Paul Foster	Li Chun Yip	UCAN	CANSHOW
Yuen Long	Wong Wai Shun	Chan Ho Yin	Fábio Lopes	Nike	Wong & Poon Solicitors
Kitchee	Ken Ng	Cheng Siu Chung; Chu Chi Kwong	Chu Siu Kei	Nike	TBC
Southern	Wong Ling Sun	Fung Hoi Man	Rubén López	Nike	Royal Sauna Spa
South China	Steven Lo	Yeung Ching Kwong	Chan Wai Ho	Adidas	Panasonic
Sun Hei	Chow Man Leung	Chan Fat Chi	Roberto	Adidas	Sunray Cave
Sun Pegasus	Cheng Ting Kong	Chan Chi Hong	Jaimes McKee	Adidas	Yahoo
Tuen Mun	Lau Wong Fat	Yan Lik Kin	Ling Cong	Kappa	Hong Kong Motor Inspection
Yokohama FC (HK)	Hiroshi Onodera	Lee Chi Kin	Tsuyoshi Yoshitake	Nike	LEOC

=== Managerial changes ===
Team	Outgoing manager	Manner of departure	Date of vacancy	Position in table	Incoming manager	Date of appointment
Kitchee	Josep Gombau	Signed by Adelaide United	30 April 2013	Pre-season	Àlex Gómez	21 May 2013
South China	Liu Chun Fai	End of contract	20 June 2013	Pre-season	Cheung Po Chun	1 July 2013
Rangers	Chan Hung Ping	Returned as assistant coach	30 June 2013	Pre-season	José Ricardo Rambo	6 July 2013
Happy Valley	Sergio Timoner	Promoted as Technical Director	8 October 2013	12th	Paul Foster	8 October 2013
Eastern	Lee Kin Wo	Promoted as Vice Director	10 October 2013	5th	Cristiano Cordeiro	10 October 2013
Kitchee	Àlex Gómez	Resigned	14 November 2013	1st	Cheng Siu Chung; Chu Chi Kwong	14 November 2013
South China	Cheung Po Chun	Mutual Consent	17 February 2014	2nd	Yeung Ching Kwong	17 February 2014

=== Foreign players ===
The number of foreign players is restricted to seven (including an Asian player) per team, with no more than five on pitch during matches.

Club	Player 1	Player 2	Player 3	Player 4	Player 5	Player 6	Asian Player
Rangers	(Brazil) Luciano Silva	(Brazil) Tomas Maronesi	(Brazil) Tales Schütz	(Croatia) Miroslav Saric	(Brazil) Joel	(Spain) Iván Zarandona	
Citizen	(Brazil) Fernando	(Brazil) Paulinho Piracicaba	(Brazil) Hélio	(Serbia) Marko Krasić	(Brazil) Stefan Pereira	(Croatia) Tino Lagator	(Japan) Yuto Nakamura
Eastern	(Brazil) Paulo César	(Brazil) Diego Eli	(Brazil) Clayton Afonso	(Brazil) Itaparica	(Brazil) Beto Fronza	(Brazil) Giovane Silva	(Australia) Dylan Macallister
Yuen Long	(Brazil) Fábio Lopes	(Brazil) Gustavo Silva	(Brazil) Sandro	(Montenegro) Čedomir Mijanović	(Brazil) Wellingsson de Souza		(Japan) Yuki Fujimoto
Kitchee	(Spain) Fernando Recio	(Spain) Dani Cancela	(Spain) Jordi Tarrés	(Spain) Juan Belencoso	(Spain) Diego Cascón	(Nigeria) Alex Akande	(South Korea) Jang Kyung-Jin
Southern	(Spain) Rubén López	(Spain) Dieguito	(Spain) Yago González	(Spain) Héctor Granado	(Spain) Jonathan Carril	(Spain) Jose Maria Diaz Munoz	
South China	(Brazil) Ticão	(Brazil) Dhiego Martins	(Brazil) João Emir	(Netherlands) Vincent Weijl	(Bosnia and Herzegovina) Saša Kajkut	(Australia) Andrew Barisic	(South Korea) Ko Kyung-Joon
Sun Pegasus	(Cameroon) Eugene Mbome	(Brazil) Paulo Cesar	(Serbia) Igor Miović	(Bosnia and Herzegovina) Admir Raščić	(Croatia) Josip Škorić	(Serbia) Aleksandar Ranđelović	(Australia) Marko Jesic
Sun Hei	(Brazil) Roberto Júnior	(Cameroon) Jean-Jacques Kilama	(Cameroon) Yrel Bouet	(Serbia) Mirko Teodorović	(Brazil) Michel Lugo	(Brazil) Reinaldo de Morais Peres	(China) Zhang Jun
Yokohama FC (HK)	(Japan) Kenji Fukuda	(Japan) Taiki Murai	(Japan) Tsuyoshi Yoshitake	(Japan) Masaaki Ideguchi			(South Korea) Park Tae-Hong

== League table ==
Pos	Team	Pld	W	D	L	GF	GA	GD	Pts	Qualification or relegation
1	Kitchee (C)	18	15	3	0	47	12	+35	48	2015 AFC Champions League play-off stage
2	Sun Pegasus	18	10	2	6	40	28	+12	32	2013–14 Hong Kong season play-off
3	South China	18	8	8	2	35	24	+11	32	2015 AFC Cup (Note: South China won the 2013–14 Hong Kong season play-off and thus qualified for the 2015 AFC Cup group stage.)
4	Royal Southern (R)	18	5	6	7	25	32	−7	21	2013–14 Hong Kong season play-off and relegation to 2014–15 Hong Kong First Division League (Note: Since the 2013–14 Hong Kong Senior Challenge Shield winners (South China) would at this point qualify for the 2013–14 Hong Kong season play-off, the 4th placed team would qualify for the Season Play-off. At the same time, Royal Southern declined to participate in the 2014–15 Hong Kong Premier League and would self-relegate in the following season.)
5	Hong Kong Rangers	18	5	6	7	23	32	−9	21	
6	Eastern Salon	18	5	6	7	34	37	−3	21	2013–14 Hong Kong season play-off (Note: Eastern Salon qualified for the 2013–14 Hong Kong season play-off as winners of the 2013–14 Hong Kong FA Cup.)
7	I-Sky Yuen Long	18	5	5	8	25	33	−8	20	
8	Sunray Cave JC Sun Hei (R)	18	5	4	9	32	41	−9	19	Relegation to 2014–15 Hong Kong First Division League (Note: Sunray Cave JC Sun Hei & Citizen declined to participate in the 2014–15 Hong Kong Premier League and would self-relegate in the following season.)
9	Citizen (R)	18	4	6	8	25	33	−8	18	Relegation to 2014–15 Hong Kong First Division League
10	Yokohama FC Hong Kong	18	3	4	11	25	39	−14	13	
11	Happy Valley (D, R)	0	0	0	0	0	0	0	0	Excluded, record expunged Relegation to 2014–15 Hong Kong First Division League (Note: On 13 February 2014, the HKFA announced that as a result of a match-fixing investigation, both Tuen Mun and Happy Valley would be excluded from the league, and their records would be expunged.)
12	Tuen Mun (D, R)	0	0	0	0	0	0	0	0	Excluded, record expunged Relegation to 2014–15 Hong Kong First Division League

Updated to match(es) played on 11 May 2014. Source: Hong Kong Football Association
Rules for classification: 1) points; 2) head-to-head points; 3) head-to-head goal difference; 4) head-to-head goals scored; 5) goal difference; 6) number of goals scored.
(C) Champions; (D) Disqualified; (R) Relegated

=== Positions by round ===
To preserve the chronological order of events, any postponed matches are not included to the round at which they were originally scheduled, but added to the full round they were played immediately afterwards. For example, if a match is scheduled for round 7, but then played between rounds 8 and 9, it will be added to the standings for round 8.

Team ╲ Round	1	2	3	4	5	6	7	8	9	10	11	12	13	14	15	16	17	18	19	20	21	22
Hong Kong Rangers	3	2	2	4	4	5	6	8	5	5	6	6	4	6	7	7	7	8	8			5
Citizen	5	6	6	6	6	7	9	7	8	7	7	7	7	8	8	8	8	9	10			9
Eastern Salon	7	12	12	10	7	6	4	5	6	6	4	5	6	5	4	4	4	4	4			6
Happy Valley	8	10	10	11	11	11	11	11	11	11	11	11	11	11	11	11	11	11	11	11	11	11
I-Sky Yuen Long	4	7	9	9	9	8	7	9	9	9	10	8	8	9	9	9	9	7	7			7
Kitchee	1	1	1	1	1	1	1	1	1	1	1	1	1	1	1	1	1	1	1	1	1	1
Royal Southern	11	4	4	5	5	4	3	4	4	4	5	3	3	4	5	5	5	6	6			4
South China	2	5	3	2	2	2	2	2	2	2	2	2	2	2	2	2	2	3	3			3
Sunray Cave JC Sun Hei	12	9	7	8	10	10	8	6	7	8	8	9	9	7	6	6	6	5	5			8
Sun Pegasus	9	3	5	3	3	3	5	3	3	3	3	4	5	3	3	3	3	2	2			2
Tuen Mun	10	11	11	12	12	12	12	12	12	12	12	12	12	12	12	12	12	12	12	12	12	12
Yokohama FC Hong Kong	6	8	8	7	8	9	10	10	10	10	9	10	10	10	10	10	10	10	9			10

Leader; 2015 AFC Cup group stage
2013–14 Hong Kong season play-off
Relegation to 2014–15 Hong Kong Second Division League

Updated to match(es) played on 6 April 2014. Source:

== Results ==
Home \ Away	HKR	CIT	EAA	IYL	KIT	SOU	SCA	SUN	SPS	YHK
Hong Kong Rangers		2–2	1–1	0–1	1–4	1–1	2–1	1–1	0–0	3–2
Citizen	0–1		1–1	2–1	0–2	2–1	1–4	3–4	2–1	1–1
Eastern Salon	3–4	2–2		0–1	2–2	4–1	0–0	4–2	3–4	2–0
I-Sky Yuen Long	2–2	2–1	1–2		0–2	0–1	2–2	3–1	1–4	3–1
Kitchee	4–1	3–1	3–0	3–1		4–0	1–1	6–2	3–1	4–1
Royal Southern	2–1	1–1	3–2	1–1	0–1		1–1	2–1	1–2	2–2
South China	2–0	3–2	4–2	2–2	0–0	3–2		2–0	2–2	3–1
Sunray Cave JC Sun Hei	1–2	1–1	2–3	3–3	0–2	2–3	0–0		3–2	3–2
Sun Pegasus	1–0	0–1	5–2	4–0	1–2	2–1	5–3	1–3		2–0
Yokohama FC Hong Kong	4–1	3–2	1–1	2–1	0–1	2–2	1–2	1–3	1–3	

Updated to match(es) played on 11 May 2014. Source:
Legend: Blue = home team win; Yellow = draw; Red = away team win.

== Fixtures and results ==
=== Round 1 ===
30 August 2013	Sun Pegasus	3 – 0 (Voided)	Happy Valley	Mong Kok, Kowloon
20:00 UTC+8	Raščić 4'; Ju Yingzhi 12'; Chan Pak Hang (yellow card) 22'; Kim Dong-Ryeol 82'	Report	(yellow card) 29' Tai Sze Chung; (yellow card) 47' Arce; (yellow card) 57' Cheng Chi Wing; (yellow card) 65' Li Chun Yip; (yellow card) 75' Lau Ka Shing	Stadium: Mong Kok Stadium (Capacity: 6,680); Attendance: 2,244; Referee: Ng Chiu Kok; Assistant referees: Lam Chi Ho, Chan Siu Hung; Fourth official: Tong Kui Sum

31 August 2013	I-Sky Yuen Long	2–2	Biu Chun Rangers	Yuen Long, New Territories
14:30 UTC+8	Souza 31', 57'; Cheng King Ho (yellow card) 16'; Fabio Lopes (yellow card) 19' (red card) 20'	Report	3' Marques; 32' Chuck Yiu Kwok; (yellow card) 54' Chow Cheuk Fung; (yellow card) 71' Chan Ming Kong	Stadium: Yuen Long Stadium (Capacity: 4,932); Attendance: 1,053; Referee: Ho Wai Sing; Assistant referees: Chow Chun Kit, Lau Fong Hei; Fourth official: Chan Ming Siu

1 September 2013	Citizen	1–1	Yokohama FC Hong Kong	Tsing Yi, New Territories
14:30 UTC+8	Stefan 53'; Krasić (yellow card) 53'; Sham Kwok Fai (yellow card) 66'	Report	(yellow card) 50' Chan Chun Lok; (yellow card) 58' (yellow-red card) 74' Park Tae-Hong; 81' Fukuda	Stadium: Tsing Yi Sports Ground (Capacity: 1,500); Attendance: 472; Referee: Ng Kai Lam; Assistant referees: Chow Chun Kit, Luk Kin Sun; Fourth official: Liu Kwok Man

1 September 2013	Eastern Salon	2 – 1 (Voided)	Tuen Mun	Tsuen Wan, New Territories
14:30 UTC+8	Itaparica 16', 45+2'; Leung Kwok Wai (yellow card) 68'; Leung Chi Wing (yellow card) 83'; Lau Nim Yat (yellow card) 87'	Report	27' Yip Tsz Chun; (yellow card) 90' Xie Silida	Stadium: Shing Mun Valley Sports Ground (Capacity: 5,000); Attendance: 1,154; Referee: Cheng Oi Cho; Assistant referees: Lam Chi Ho, Yau Ho Fai; Fourth official: Lui Siu Chuen

1 September 2013	South China	3–2	Royal Southern	Mong Kok, Kowloon
17:30 UTC+8	Sealy (yellow card) 10'; Barry 48', 74' (pen.); Ticão (yellow card) 63'; Zhang Chunhui (yellow card) 81'; Tse 86'	Report	42' Carril; 61' Yago; (yellow card) 73' Lo Chi Kwan; (yellow card) 80' Héctor; (yellow card) 81' Rubén; (yellow card) 90+1' Ngan Lok Fung	Stadium: Mong Kok Stadium (Note: Due to bad pitch condition, the match will be played at Mong Kok Stadium instead of South China's home ground Hong Kong Stadium.) (Capacity: 6,680); Attendance: 2,566; Referee: Tong Kui Sum; Assistant referees: Chan Shui Hung, Yu Chun San; Fourth official: Sarao Amarjit Singh

3 September 2013 Postponed	Kitchee	6–2	Sunray Cave JC Sun Hei	Mong Kok, Kowloon
20:00 UTC+8	Reinaldo 22' (o.g.); Belencoso 30', 45'; Alex (yellow card) 71'; Jordi 82', 88'; Su Yang 90+2' (o.g.)	Report	(yellow card) 9' Yuen Tsun Nam; 44' (yellow card) 45+1' Lugo; 46' Bouet; (yellow card) 72' Reinaldo; (yellow card) 74' Cheung Kwok Ming	Stadium: Mong Kok Stadium (Capacity: 6,680); Attendance: 1,214; Referee: Liu Kwok Man; Assistant referees: Lui Siu Chuen, Lam Nai Kei; Fourth official: Luk Kin Sun

=== Round 2 ===
13 September 2013	Kitchee	3–0	Eastern Salon	Mong Kok, Kowloon
20:00 UTC+8	Beto 43' (o.g.); Beloncoso 43'; Jordi (yellow card) 28' (goal) 57' (pen.); Dani (yellow card) 70'	Report	(yellow card) 43' Man Pei Tak; (yellow card) 90+3' Cheng Siu Wai	Stadium: Mong Kok Stadium (Capacity: 6,680); Attendance: 2,214; Referee: Tong Kui Sum; Assistant referees: Lam Nai Kei, Lau Fong Hei; Fourth official: Lam Chi Ho

14 September 2013	Sunray Cave JC Sun Hei	1–1	Citizen	Tsing Yi, New Territories
14:30 UTC+8	Reinaldo 9'; Lugo (yellow card) 28'	Report	(yellow card) 42' Festus; 56' Sham Kwok Keung	Stadium: Tsing Yi Sports Ground (Capacity: 1,500); Attendance: 309; Referee: Ng Chiu Kok; Assistant referees: Cheng Oi Cho, Yau Ho Fai; Fourth official: Yu Kin Fung

14 September 2013	Sun Pegasus	5–3	South China	Mong Kok, Kowloon
17:30 UTC+8	Miović 18', 61'; Ju Yingzhi 19'; Raščić 28', 73' (yellow card) 54'; Landon Ling (yellow card) 82'	Report	(yellow card) 8' Michael Luk; (yellow card) 11' Aender; 16', 23' Dhiego; 55' (pen.) Barry; (yellow card) 78' Chak Ting Fung	Stadium: Mong Kok Stadium (Capacity: 6,680); Attendance: 3,200; Referee: Ng Kai Lam; Assistant referees: Chow Chun Kit, Luk Kin Sun; Fourth official: Chan Shui Hung

15 September 2013	Tuen Mun	1 – 0 (Voided)	Happy Valley	Tuen Mun, New Territories
14:30 UTC+8	Li Ming (yellow card) 11'; Madjo 90'	Report	(yellow card) 55' Yeung Chi Lun; (yellow card) 60' Lau Ka Shing	Stadium: Tuen Mun Tang Shiu Kin Sports Ground (Capacity: 2,200); Attendance: 471; Referee: Ho Wai Sing; Assistant referees: Lui Siu Chuen, Yu Chun Sun; Fourth official: Tang Hing Fu

15 September 2013	Biu Chun Rangers	3–2	Yokohama FC Hong Kong	Sham Shui Po, Kowloon
14:30 UTC+8	Lam Hok Hei 13' (pen.); Moses 42' (yellow card) 90+3'; Daniel (yellow card) 57'; Tomas (yellow card) 67'; Chan Ming Kong (yellow card) 85'; Miroslav 90' (pen.)	Report	(yellow card) 12' Murai; 34', 90+1' Fukuda; (yellow card) 40' Chan Chun Lok; (yellow card) 53' Yoshitake; (yellow card) 56' Leung Kwun Chung	Stadium: Sham Shui Po Sports Ground (Capacity: 2,194); Attendance: 457; Referee: Liu Kwok Man; Assistant referees: Tong Kui Sum, Sarao Amarjit Singh; Fourth official: Yau Tsz Yeung

15 September 2013	I-Sky Yuen Long	0–1	Royal Southern	Yuen Long, New Territories
17:30 UTC+8	Gustavo (yellow card) 57'; Fung Kai Hong (yellow card) 82'; Sandro (yellow card) 90+3'; Souza (yellow card) 90+4'	Report	(yellow card) 5' Chung Hon Chee; (yellow card) 61' Yago; (yellow card) 72' Héctor; (yellow card) 77' Che Runqiu; 90' Carril; (yellow card) 90+4' Ngan Lok Fung	Stadium: Yuen Long Stadium (Capacity: 4,932); Attendance: 1,004; Referee: Chan Shui Hung; Assistant referees: Cheng Oi Cho, Chan Siu Ming; Fourth official: Fok Pong Shing

=== Round 3 ===
21 September 2013	Biu Chun Rangers	1–1	Sunray Cave JC Sun Hei	Sham Shui Po, Kowloon
14:30 UTC+8	Razumovic (yellow card) 2'; Law Hiu Chung (yellow card) 45+1'; Chuck Yiu Kwok 71'	Report	12' (yellow card) 45+4' Kot Cho Wai; (yellow card) 29' Kilama	Stadium: Sham Shui Po Sports Ground (Capacity: 2,194); Attendance: 250; Referee: Chan Shui Hung

21 September 2013	Royal Southern	1–1	Citizen	Mong Kok, Kowloon
14:30 UTC+8	Yago 34'; Chung Hon Chee (yellow card) 80'	Report	(yellow card) 19' Krasić; 36' Detinho; (yellow card) 54' Chan Hin Kwong	Stadium: Mong Kok Stadium (Note: Due to bad pitch condition, the match will be played at Mong Kok Stadium instead of Southern's home ground Aberdeen Sports Ground.) (Capacity: 6,680); Attendance: 544; Referee: Ho Wai Sing; Assistant referees: Lui Siu Chuen, Tang Hing Fu; Fourth official: Luk Kin Sun

21 September 2013	South China	0–0	Kitchee	So Kon Po, Hong Kong Island
17:00 UTC+8	Joel (yellow card) 1'	Report	(yellow card) 35' Recio; (yellow card) 79' Dani	Stadium: Hong Kong Stadium (Capacity: 40,000); Attendance: 3,493; Referee: Tong Kui Sum; Assistant referees: Chow Chun Kit, Lam Nai Kei; Fourth official: Yu Chun Sun

13 October 2013 Postponed (Note: The match originally kicks off on 22 September 2013. Due to typhoon, the match was cancelled and postponed. It has been scheduled to play at 14:30 on 13 October 2013.)	Tuen Mun	0 – 1 (Voided)	I-Sky Yuen Long	Tuen Mun, Hong Kong Island
14:30 UTC+8	Tsang Chiu Tat (yellow card) 6'	Report	(yellow card) 59' Mijanović; 89' Sandro	Stadium: Tuen Mun Tang Shiu Kin Sports Ground (Capacity: 2,200); Attendance: 679

3 November 2013 Postponed (Note: The match originally kicks off on 22 September 2013. Due to typhoon, the match was cancelled and postponed. It has been scheduled to play at 14:30 on 3 November 2013.)	Eastern Salon	2 – 0 (Voided)	Happy Valley	Tsuen Wan, New Territories
14:30 UTC+8	Clayton 38'; Tse Man Wing 81' (yellow card) 90+4'	Report	(yellow card) 45+1' Abálsamo; (yellow card) 73' Bamnjo	Stadium: Shing Mun Valley Sports Ground (Capacity: 5,000); Attendance: 442; Referee: Lau Fong Hei; Assistant referees: Chan Shiu Hung, Sarao Amarjit Singh; Fourth official: Yu Kin Fung

26 February 2014 Postponed (Note: The match originally kicks off on 22 September 2013. Due to typhoon, the match was cancelled and postponed. It has been scheduled to play at 20:00 on 26 February 2014.)	Yokohama FC Hong Kong	1–3	Sun Pegasus	Tseung Kwan O, New Territories
20:00 UTC+8	Ideguchi (yellow card) 32'; Cesar 61' (o.g.)	Report	(yellow card) 11' (goal) 85' Ju Yingzhi; 51' Miović; 58' Raščić	Stadium: Tseung Kwan O Sports Ground (Capacity: 3,500); Attendance: 257; Referee: Luk Kin Sun; Assistant referees: Lui Siu Chuen, Yau Ho Fai; Fourth official: Lo Ming Leong

=== Round 4 ===
28 September 2013	Yokohama FC Hong Kong	1–1	Eastern Salon	Tseung Kwan O, New Territories
14:30 UTC+8	Fong Pak Lun (yellow card) 4'; Leung Kwun Chung (yellow card) 10'; Fukuda 48'; Leung Lok Hang (yellow card) 66'; Park Tae-Hong (yellow card) 68'; Yoshitake (yellow card) 79'	Report	(yellow card) 13' Lau Nim Yat; 32' Giovane; (yellow card) 52' Clayton; (yellow card) 55' Beto; (yellow card) 79' Yiu Hok Man; (yellow card) 90+2' Diego	Stadium: Tseung Kwan O Sports Ground (Capacity: 3,500); Attendance: 431; Referee: Ng Kai Lam; Assistant referees: Chan Shui Hung, Sarao Amarjit Singh; Fourth official: Lam Nai Kei

28 September 2013	Sun Pegasus	2–1	Royal Southern	Mong Kok, Kowloon
14:30 UTC+8	Cesar (yellow card) 36'; Ranđelović 38'; Landon Ling (yellow card) 53'; Mbome (yellow card) 61'; Campion 76'	Report	(yellow card) 17' Chung Hong Chee; (yellow card) 20' Chiu Yu Ming; (yellow card) 55' Chan Cheuk Kwong; 72' Chow Ka Wa	Stadium: Mong Kok Stadium (Capacity: 6,680); Attendance: 1,501; Referee: Liu Kwok Man; Assistant referees: Chow Chun Kit, Lau Hong Hei; Fourth official: Yau Tsz Yeung

28 September 2013	South China	2–0	Sunray Cave JC Sun Hei	So Kon Po, Hong Kong Island
17:30 UTC+8	Chak Ting Fung 27'; Lo Kong Wai 59'	Report	(yellow card) 61' Kilama; (yellow card) 66' Reinaldo; (yellow card) 67' Mirko	Stadium: Hong Kong Stadium (Capacity: 40,000); Attendance: 1,397; Referee: Ng Chiu Kok; Assistant referees: Lam Chi Ho, Chan Ming Siu; Fourth official: Yu Kin Fung

29 September 2013	Biu Chun Rangers	1 – 1 (Voided)	Tuen Mun	Sham Shui Po, Kowloon
14:30 UTC+8	Luciano 14'; Chan Ming Kong (yellow card) 45+3'; Liu Songwei (yellow card) 46'; Law Hiu Chung (yellow card) 90'	Report	40' Sanchez	Stadium: Sham Shui Po Sports Ground (Capacity: 2,194); Attendance: 245; Referee: Tong Kui Sum; Assistant referees: Chan Shui Hung, Lam Nai Kei; Fourth official: Tang Hing Fu

29 September 2013	Kitchee	3–1	Citizen	Mong Kok, Kowloon
14:30 UTC+8	Alex 15', 75'; Lam Ka Wai 45+4'	Report	(yellow card) 24' Chan Hin Kwong; (yellow card) 29' Sham Kwok Keung; (yellow card) 78' So Loi Keung; 85' Nakamura	Stadium: Mong Kok Stadium (Capacity: 6,680); Attendance: 1,250; Referee: Cheng Oi Cho; Assistant referees: Lui Siu Chuen, Yau Ho Fai; Fourth official: Fok Pong Shing

29 September 2013	I-Sky Yuen Long	2 – 2 (Voided)	Happy Valley	Yuen Long, New Territories
17:30 UTC+8	Cheung Tsz Kin (yellow card) 52'; Mijanović 78'; Hui Wang Fung 90+3'	Report	29' Acosta; 63' (o.g.) Mijanović; (yellow card) 89' Li Chun Yip	Stadium: Yuen Long Stadium (Capacity: 4,932); Attendance: 872; Referee: Ho Wai Sing; Assistant referees: Yu Chun Sun, Luk Kin Sun; Fourth official: Ng Kai Lam

=== Round 5 ===
5 October 2013	South China	2–2	I-Sky Yuen Long	So Kon Po, Hong Kong Island
17:30 UTC+8	Cheng Lai Hin 49'; Dhiego 57'	Report	(yellow card) 40' Gustavo; 68' (yellow card) 69' Sandro; 90+1' (yellow card) 90+5' Marques; (yellow card) 90+4' Souza	Stadium: Hong Kong Stadium (Capacity: 40,000); Attendance: 1,402; Referee: Liu Kwok Man; Assistant referees: Ng Kai Lam, Sarao Amarjit Singh; Fourth official: Yu Chun Sun

6 October 2013	Citizen	1–1	Eastern Salon	Tsing Yi, New Territories
17:30 UTC+8	Nakamura (yellow card) 31'; Paulinho 52'; Tam Lok Hin (yellow card) 84'	Report	38' Cheng Siu Wai; (yellow card) 50' Diego; (yellow card) 79' Tse Man Wing	Stadium: Tsing Yi Sports Ground (Capacity: 1,500); Attendance: 648; Referee: Luk Kin Sun; Assistant referees: Lam Nai Kei, Yau Ho Fai; Fourth official: Ho Wai Sing

10 November 2013 Postponed	Sunray Cave JC Sun Hei	3–2	Sun Pegasus	Tsing Yi, New Territories
14:30 UTC+8	Kilama (yellow card) 24'; Roberto (yellow card) 29' (yellow-red card) 64'; Mirko (yellow card) 31'; Reinaldo (yellow card) 58' (goal) 90'; So Wai Chuen 79' (o.g.); Cheung Kwok Ming 83'	Report	23' (yellow card) 65' Ju Yingzhi; (yellow card) 26' Tong Kin Man; (yellow card) 31' Campion; 46' (yellow card) 70' Landon Ling; (yellow card) 78' Miović	Stadium: Tsing Yi Sports Ground (Capacity: 1,500); Attendance: 502; Referee: Chan Shui Hung; Assistant referees: Lau Fong Hei, Yau Tsz Yeung; Fourth official: Chan Ming Siu

11 January 2014 Postponed (Note: Due to the investigating on match-fixing, the HKFA 1st Division matches involving Tuen Mun and Happy Valley will be postponed with immediate effect for one month pending the result of a hearing to be scheduled as soon as possible and hopefully approximately 1 week to 10 days from now.)	Happy Valley	Cancelled	Yokohama FC Hong Kong	Tai Po, New Territories
14:30 UTC+8				Stadium: Tai Po Sports Ground (Capacity: 3,000)

11 January 2014 Postponed (Note: Due to the investigating on match-fixing, the HKFA 1st Division matches involving Tuen Mun and Happy Valley will be postponed with immediate effect for one month pending the result of a hearing to be scheduled as soon as possible and hopefully approximately 1 week to 10 days from now.)	Royal Southern	Cancelled	Tuen Mun	Aberdeen, Hong Kong Island
14:30 UTC+8				Stadium: Aberdeen Sports Ground (Capacity: 4,000)

11 January 2014 Postponed	Kitchee	4–1	Biu Chun Rangers	Mong Kok, Kowloon
17:30 UTC+8	Recio 15'; Jordi 33'; Gao Wen (yellow card) 80'; Belencoso 81', 90+3'	Report	4' Lam Hok Hei	Stadium: Mong Kok Stadium (Capacity: 6,680); Attendance: 1,020; Referee: Tong Kui Sum; Assistant referees: Lau Fong Hei, Sarao Amarjit Singh; Fourth official: Yau Tsz Yeung

=== Round 6 ===
19 October 2013	Tuen Mun	1 – 4 (Voided)	Citizen	Tuen Mun, New Territories
14:30 UTC+8	Siu Leong (yellow card) 68'; Law Ka Lok (yellow card) 77'; Madjo 78'	Report	41' Sham Kwok Keung; 57' Nakamura; 69' (pen.) Krasić; 73' Fernando	Stadium: Tuen Mun Tang Shiu Kin Sports Ground (Capacity: 2,200); Attendance: 462; Referee: Lui Siu Chuen; Assistant referees: Chan Shiu Hung, Tang Hing Fu; Fourth official: Yu Chun Sun

19 October 2013	Royal Southern	2–1	Sunray Cave JC Sun Hei	Aberdeen, Hong Kong Island
14:30 UTC+8	Carril 45+1'; Ip Chung Long 79'	Report	27' Kilama; (yellow card) 44' Yuen Chun Nam; (yellow card) 56' Reinaldo; (yellow card) 64' Bouet; (yellow card) 90' Wong Chun Hin	Stadium: Aberdeen Sports Ground (Capacity: 4,000); Attendance: 364; Referee: Liu Kwok Man; Assistant referees: Chan Ming Siu, Sarao Amarjit Singh; Fourth official: Ho Wai Sing

19 October 2013	Yokohama FC Hong Kong	0–1	Kitchee	Tseung Kwan O, New Territories
17:30 UTC+8		Report	(yellow card) 9' Recio; (yellow card) 52' Chan Man Fai; 65' Annan; (yellow card) 84' Alex	Stadium: Tseung Kwan O Sports Ground (Capacity: 3,500); Attendance: 605; Referee: Luk Kin Sun; Assistant referees: Chow Chun Kit, Lam Nai Kei; Fourth official: Lau Fong Hei

20 October 2013	Happy Valley	1 – 4 (Voided)	South China	Mong Kok, Kowloon
14:30 UTC+8	Acosta (yellow card) 20'; Choi Kwok Wai 28'; Chao Pengfei (yellow card) 89'	Report	36' Lee Wai Lim; 41' Lee Hong Lim; 64' Kwok Kin Pong; 90' (pen.) Barry	Stadium: Mong Kok Stadium (Capacity: 6,680); Attendance: 1,492; Referee: Tong Kui Sum; Assistant referees: Cheng Oi Cho, Lau Fong Hei; Fourth official: Yau Tsz Yeung

20 October 2013	Biu Chun Rangers	0–0	Sun Pegasus	Sham Shui Po, Kowloon
14:30 UTC+8	Chan Ming Kong (yellow card) 44'; Chuck Yiu Kwok (yellow card) 81'	Report	(yellow card) 65' Ranđelović; (yellow card) 70' (yellow-red card) 76' Landon Ling; (yellow card) 79' Raščić	Stadium: Sham Shui Po Sports Ground (Capacity: 2,194); Attendance: 566; Referee: Ho Wai Sing; Assistant referees: Yau Ho Fai, Fok Pong Sing; Fourth official: Liu Kwok Man

20 October 2013	I-Sky Yuen Long	1–2	Eastern Salon	Yuen Long, New Territories
17:30 UTC+8	Sandro 51'; Souza (yellow card) 69'	Report	1' Itaparica; 21' Giovane; (yellow card) 87' Diego	Stadium: Yuen Long Stadium (Capacity: 4,932); Attendance: 1,107; Referee: Ng Kai Lam; Assistant referees: Yu Chun Sun, Yu Kin Fung; Fourth official: Lui Siu Chuen

=== Round 7 ===
26 October 2013	Citizen	3 – 2 (Voided)	Happy Valley	Tsing Yi, New Territories
14:30 UTC+8	Nakamura 17', 79'; Paulinho 34'; Chan Hin Kwong (yellow card) 45+1'; Krasić (yellow card) 77'	Report	(yellow card) 15' Li Chun Yip; (yellow card) 23' Mus; (yellow card) 50' Bamnjo; (yellow card) 55' (red card) 63' Fan Weijun; (yellow card) 64' Akosah; 73', 90+4' Abalsamo	Stadium: Tsing Yi Sports Ground (Capacity: 1,500); Attendance: 223; Referee: Ng Chiu Kok; Assistant referees: Chan Shui Hung, Yau Tsz Yeung; Fourth official: Wong Yin Wai

26 October 2013	Sun Pegasus	6 – 0 (Voided)	Tuen Mun	Mong Kok, Kowloon
14:30 UTC+8	Raščić 12', 34', 53' (yellow card) 37'; Lo Chun Kit (yellow card) 28'; McKee 79'; Ju Yingzhi 86'	Report	(yellow card) 4' Li Ming; (yellow card) 8' Sánchez; (yellow card) 57' Hu Jun	Stadium: Mong Kok Stadium (Capacity: 6,680); Attendance: 1,443; Referee: Liu Kwok Man; Assistant referees: Lam Nai Kei, Lam Chi Ho; Fourth official: Yu Kin Fung

26 October 2013	I-Sky Yuen Long	3–1	Sunray Cave JC Sun Hei	Yuen Long, New Territories
17:30 UTC+8	Souza 13', 60'; Fábio 86'	Report	(yellow card) 33' James Ha; 70' Kilama	Stadium: Yuen Long Stadium (Capacity: 4,932); Attendance: 849; Referee: Ho Wai Sing; Assistant referees: Lui Siu Chuen, Luk Kin Sun; Fourth official: Yu Chun Sun

27 October 2013	Biu Chun Rangers	1–1	Eastern Salon	Sham Shui Po, Kowloon
14:30 UTC+8	Schutz 2' (yellow card) 3'; Liu Songwei (yellow card) 40'; Miroslav (yellow card) 56'; Moses (yellow card) 80'; Leung Hin Kit (yellow card) 84'	Report	(yellow card) 24' Clayton; (yellow card) 37' Itaparica; 90' Leung Kwok Wai; (yellow card) 90+2' Leung Chi Wing	Stadium: Sham Shui Po Sports Ground (Capacity: 2,194); Attendance: 690; Referee: Tong Kui Sum; Assistant referees: Chow Chun Kit, Chan Ming Siu; Fourth official: Sarao Amarjit Singh

27 October 2013	Yokohama FC Hong Kong	1–2	South China	Tseung Kwan O, New Territories
14:30 UTC+8	Harada (yellow card) 22'; Leung Kwun Chung (yellow card) 57'; Liang Zicheng (yellow card) 78'; Fong Pak Lun (yellow card) 80'; Chak Ting Fung 84' (o.g.); Li Shu Yeung (red card) 90+4'	Report	(yellow card) 37' (yellow-red card) 59' Michael Luk; 60' Kwok Kin Pong; (yellow card) 90+1' Zhang Chunhui; 90+5' (pen.) Barry	Stadium: Tseung Kwan O Sports Ground (Capacity: 3,500); Attendance: 1,003; Referee: Ng Kai Lam; Assistant referees: Cheng Oi Cho, Lau Fong Hei; Fourth official: Tang Hing Fu

3 November 2013	Royal Southern	0–1	Kitchee	Aberdeen, Hong Kong Island
14:30 UTC+8	Ip Chung Long (yellow card) 50'	Report	5' Jordi	Stadium: Aberdeen Sports Ground (Capacity: 4,000); Attendance: 586; Referee: Lau Fong Hei; Assistant referees: Yu Chun Sun, Fok Pong Shing; Fourth official: Ng Kai Lam

=== Round 8 ===
30 November 2013	Happy Valley	2 – 4 (Voided)	Royal Southern	Tai Po, New Territories
14:30 UTC+8	Acosta 23'; Arce (yellow card) 34'; Akosah 53'	Report	(yellow card) 18' Ip Chung Long; 48', 55', 67' Carril; (yellow card) 59' Li Ngai Hoi; 64' Yago	Stadium: Tai Po Sports Ground (Capacity: 3,000); Attendance: 283; Referee: Lui Siu Chuen; Assistant referees: Chan Shui Hung, Yu Kin Fung; Fourth official: Lo Yuk Ming

30 November 2013	Tuen Mun	0 – 5 (Voided)	Kitchee	Tuen Mun, New Territories
14:30 UTC+8	Garvic (yellow card) 21'; Yin Guangjun (yellow card) 44'; Feng Tao (yellow card) 53'	Report	17' Annan; 21' (pen.), 45+1', 87' Belencoso; 25' Matt Lam; (yellow card) 44' Alex	Stadium: Tuen Mun Tang Shiu Kin Sports Ground (Capacity: 2,200); Attendance: 599; Referee: Ho Wai Sing; Assistant referees: Yau Ho Fai, Sarao Amarjit Singh; Fourth official: Luk Kin Sun

30 November 2013	Citizen	2–1	I-Sky Yuen Long	Tsing Yi, New Territories
17:30 UTC+8	Stefan 42'; Detinho 84'	Report	89' Cheung Chi Kin; (yellow card) 90+3' Lau Ka Ming	Stadium: Tsing Yi Sports Ground (Capacity: 1,500); Attendance: 313; Referee: Lau Fong Hei; Assistant referees: Yu Chun Sun, Tang Hing Fu; Fourth official: Cheng Oi Cho

1 December 2013	Sunray Cave JC Sun Hei	3–2	Yokohama FC Hong Kong	Tsing Yi, New Territories
14:30 UTC+8	Lugo 22'; Kilama 36' (yellow card) 89'; Reinaldo 79'; Cheung Kwok Ming (yellow card) 83'	Report	9' Fukuda; (yellow card) 26' Harada; 30' Yoshitake; (yellow card) 44' Park Tae-Hong	Stadium: Tsing Yi Sports Ground (Capacity: 1,500); Attendance: 214; Referee: Luk Kin Sun; Assistant referees: Chan Shui Hung, Yau Tsz Yeung; Fourth official: Sarao Amarjit Singh

1 December 2013	Eastern Salon	3–4	Sun Pegasus	Mong Kok, Kowloon
14:30 UTC+8	Cheng Siu Wai 33'; Li Haiqiang (yellow card) 45+1'; Tse Man Wing (yellow card) 52' (goal) 74'; Leung Chi Wing (yellow card) 54' (yellow-red card) 90+1'; Lau Nim Yat (yellow card) 65'; Giovane 83'	Report	(yellow card) 34' Tong Kin Man; (yellow card) 36' Ju Yingzhi; 48', 90+2' Cesar; 60' McKee; 65' (pen.) Raščić; (yellow card) 90+4' Miović	Stadium: Mong Kok Stadium (Note: The match will be played at Mong Kok Stadium instead of Eastern Salon's home ground Shing Mun Valley Sports Ground.) (Capacity: 6,680); Attendance: 1,757; Referee: Tong Kui Sum; Assistant referees: Chan Ming Siu, Fok Pong Shing; Fourth official: Lau Fong Hei

1 December 2013	South China	2–0	Biu Chun Rangers	So Kon Po, Hong Kong Stadium
17:30 UTC+8	Ko Kyung-Joon 30'; Dhiego 34' (yellow card) 83'; Barry (yellow card) 40'; Lee Hong Lim (yellow card) 72'	Report	(yellow card) 31' Leung Hing Kit; (yellow card) 70' Lee Kil-Hoon	Stadium: Hong Kong Stadium (Capacity: 40,000); Attendance: 1,112; Referee: Cheng Oi Cho; Assistant referees: Yu Chun Sun, Yu Kin Fung; Fourth official: Lui Siu Chuen

=== Round 9 ===
24 November 2013	Sunray Cave JC Sun Hei	2–3	Eastern Salon	Tsing Yi, New Territories
14:30 UTC+8	Lugo 18', 40'; Su Yang (yellow card) 66'; Yuen Tsun Nam (yellow card) 72'; Kilama (yellow card) 90+4'	Report	4' Clayton; 52' Itaparica; 68' Giovane; (yellow card) 90+4' Li Haiqiang	Stadium: Tsing Yi Sports Ground (Capacity: 1,500); Attendance: 606; Referee: Tong Kui Sum; Assistant referees: Lau Fong Hei, Sarao Amarjit Singh; Fourth official: Fok Pong Shing

14 December 2013	Royal Southern	2–2	Yokohama FC Hong Kong	Aberdeen, Hong Kong Island
14:30 UTC+8	Carril 31' (yellow card) 33'; Lo Chi Kwan (yellow card) 50'; Chan Cheuk Kwong (yellow card) 77'; Chow Ka Wa 81'	Report	(yellow card) 21' (goal) 29' Liang Zicheng; (yellow card) 50' Li Shu Yeung; (yellow card) 56' Fong Pak Lun; 87' Yoshitake	Stadium: Aberdeen Sports Ground (Capacity: 4,000); Attendance: 283; Referee: Lau Fong Hei; Assistant referees: Chai Shui Hung, Lam Nai Kei; Fourth official: Ng Wai Hong

14 December 2013	I-Sky Yuen Long	1–4	Sun Pegasus	Yuen Long, New Territories
17:30 UTC+8	Sandro (yellow card) 26'; Cheung Chi Kin (yellow card) 70'; Souza 76'	Report	27' (yellow card) 58' Ranđelović; (yellow card) 44' Mbome; 51' (pen.), 63' Raščić; (yellow card) 57' Miović; 90+4' McKee	Stadium: Yuen Long Stadium (Capacity: 4,932); Attendance: 1,056; Referee: Luk Kin Sun; Assistant referees: Yu Chun Sun, Chan Ming Siu; Fourth official: Ng Kai Lam

15 December 2013	Citizen	0–1	Biu Chun Rangers	Tsing Yi, New Territories
14:30 UTC+8	Wong Yiu Fu (yellow card) 45'; Festus (yellow card) 51'	Report	(yellow card) 30' (yellow-red card) 86' Schutz; (yellow card) 43' Miroslav; (yellow card) 70' Law Hiu Chung; 73' Chuck Yiu Kwok	Stadium: Tsing Yi Sports Ground (Capacity: 1,500); Attendance: 218; Referee: Ng Kai Lam; Assistant referees: Yau Ho Fai, Fok Pong Shing; Fourth official: Chan Shui Hung

15 December 2013	South China	1 – 0 (Voided)	Tuen Mun	So Kon Po, Hong Kong Island
17:30 UTC+8	Lee Chi Ho 58' (yellow card) 80'	Report	(yellow card) 62' Tsang Chiu Tat; (yellow card) 69' Feng Tao	Stadium: Hong Kong Stadium (Capacity: 40,000); Attendance: 669; Referee: Tong Kui Sum; Assistant referees: Cheng Oi Cho, Tang Hing Fu; Fourth official: Law Bik Chi

21 December 2013	Happy Valley	1 – 5 (Voided)	Kitchee	Tai Po, New Territories
14:30 UTC+8	Akosah (yellow card) 37' (goal) 68'; Chao Pengfei (yellow card) 58'; Arce (yellow card) 63' (red card) 87'; Yeung Chi Lun (yellow card) 90'; Lau Ka Ching (yellow card) 90'; Mus (yellow card) 90'	Report	24', 44' Belencoso; 45+4' Alex; 66' Dani; 90+1' Jordi	Stadium: Tai Po Sports Ground (Capacity: 3,000); Attendance: 415; Referee: Ng Chiu Kok; Assistant referees: Chow Chun Kit, Yu Kin Fung; Fourth official: Lee Chung Yin

=== Round 10 ===
23 November 2013	Royal Southern	2–1	Biu Chun Rangers	Aberdeen, New Territories
14:30 UTC+8	Dieguito 24'; Li Ngai Hoi (yellow card) 33'; Ip Chung Long (yellow card) 63'; Chow Ka Wa 70'	Report	(yellow card) 11' Miroslav; 56' Schutz; (yellow card) 63' Chan Ming Kong	Stadium: Aberdeen Sports Ground (Capacity: 4,000); Attendance: 319; Referee: Ho Wai Sing; Assistant referees: Luk Kin Sun, Yu Kin Fung; Fourth official: Chan Ming Siu

23 November 2013	I-Sky Yuen Long	0–2	Kitchee	Yuen Long, New Territories
17:30 UTC+8	Hui Wang Fung (yellow card) 21'; Marques (yellow card) 43'; Souza (yellow card) 68'	Report	(yellow card) 11' Jordi; (yellow card) 15' Matt Lam; (yellow card) 60' Wang Zhenpeng; 79', 85' Belencoso	Stadium: Yuen Long Stadium (Capacity: 4,932); Attendance: 1,325; Referee: Ng Chiu Kok; Assistant referees: Yu Chun Sun, Lam Chi Ho; Fourth official: Lo Yuk Ming

22 December 2013	Tuen Mun	1 – 2 (Voided)	Yokohama FC Hong Kong	Tuen Mun, New Territories
14:30 UTC+8	Xie Silida (yellow card) 17'; Lai Yiu Cheong (yellow card) 18'; Yip Tsz Chun (yellow card) 32' (goal) 73'; Petar (yellow card) 48'; Tsang Chiu Tat (yellow card) 49'	Report	(yellow card) 29' Li Shu Yeung; 66' Fukuda; 90+3' Li Ming; (yellow card) 74' Harada	Stadium: Tuen Mun Tang Shiu Kin Sports Ground (Capacity: 2,200); Attendance: 525; Referee: Chan Ming Siu; Assistant referees: Cheng Oi Cho, Yu Chun Sun; Fourth official: Yau Tsz Yeung

4 January 2014	Sun Pegasus	0–1	Citizen	Mong Kok, Kowloon
17:30 UTC+8	Ranđelović (yellow card) 69'	Report	14' Stefan; (yellow card) 82' Nakamura; (yellow card) 90+8' Chan Hin Kwong	Stadium: Mong Kok Stadium (Capacity: 6,680); Attendance: 1,256; Referee: Tong Kui Sum; Assistant referees: Chow Chun Kit, Lam Nai Kei; Fourth official: Leung Chung Yin

5 January 2014	Eastern Salon	0–0	South China	Mong Kok, Kowloon
14:30 UTC+8	Li Haiqiang (yellow card) 74'; Diego (yellow card) 84'; Man Pei Tek (yellow card) 90+3'	Report	(yellow card) 50' Chan Siu Kwan; (yellow card) 59' Ticão	Stadium: Mong Kok Stadium (Capacity: 6,680); Attendance: 3,155; Referee: Ho Wai Sing; Assistant referees: Cheng Oi Cho, Yu Chun Sun; Fourth official: Lau Fong Hei

5 January 2014	Sunray Cave JC Sun Hei	5 – 0 (Voided)	Happy Valley	Tsing Yi, New Territories
17:30 UTC+8	Cheung Kwok Ming 8'; Jing Teng (yellow card) 20'; Roberto 34' (pen.); Mirko (yellow card) 38'; Kilama 42'; Bouet 50'; Lugo 56'	Report	(yellow card) 24' Choi Kwok Wai; (yellow card) 32' Yeung Chi Lun; (yellow card) 52' (yellow-red card) 70' Akosah; (yellow card) 74' Saša Mus	Stadium: Tsing Yi Sports Ground (Capacity: 1,500); Attendance: 268; Referee: Chan Ming Siu; Assistant referees: Chan Shui Hung, Yu Kin Fung; Fourth official: Fok Pong Shing

=== Round 11 ===
18 January 2014	Citizen	1–4	South China	Mong Kok, Kowloon
17:30 UTC+8	Nakamura 25'	Report	(yellow card) 75' Sealy; 81' Lee Hong Lim; 82' Lee Chi Ho; 85' Weiji; 87' Kwok Kin Pong	Stadium: Mong Kok Stadium (Note: The match will be played at Mong Kok Stadium instead of Citizen's home ground Tsing Yi Sports Ground.) (Capacity: 6,680); Attendance: 2,090; Referee: Tong Kui Sum; Assistant referees: Chan Shui Hung, Tang Hing Fu; Fourth official: Yu Kin Fung

19 January 2014	Kitchee	3–1	Sun Pegasus	Mong Kok, Kowloon
14:30 UTC+8	Annan 14'; Huang Yang (yellow card) 33'; Recio (yellow card) 65'; Belencoso 80', 83'; Jang Kyung-Jin (yellow card) 88'	Report	(yellow card) 23' Deng Jinghuang; 89' (pen.) Raščić; (yellow card) 90+1' Tong Kin Man; (yellow card) 90+3' Mbome	Stadium: Mong Kok Stadium (Capacity: 6,680); Attendance: 2,742; Referee: Ho Wai Sing; Assistant referees: Luk Kin Sun, Yau Ho Fai; Fourth official: Lau Fong Hei

24 January 2014	Yokohama FC Hong Kong	2–1	I-Sky Yuen Long	Tseung Kwan O, New Territories
20:00 UTC+8	Harada 8' (yellow card) 70'; Fong Pak Lun (yellow card) 29'; Fukuda 77'	Report	(yellow card) 55' Chan Ka Chun; (yellow card) 65' Fábio; 68' Souza; (yellow card) 71' Gustavo	Stadium: Tseung Kwan O Sports Ground (Capacity: 3,500); Attendance: 301; Referee: Ng Kai Lam; Assistant referees: Cheng Oi Cho, Yau Tsz Yeung; Fourth official: Lam Nai Kei

25 January 2014 Postponed (Note: Due to the investigating on match-fixing, the HKFA 1st Division matches involving Tuen Mun and Happy Valley will be postponed with immediate effect for one month pending the result of a hearing to be scheduled as soon as possible and hopefully approximately 1 week to 10 days from now.)	Biu Chun Rangers	Cancelled	Happy Valley	Sham Shui Po, Kowloon
14:30 UTC+8				Stadium: Sham Shui Po Sports Ground (Capacity: 2,194); Referee: Ng Chiu Kok

26 January 2014	Eastern Salon	4–1	Royal Southern	Sham Shui Po, Kowloon
14:30 UTC+8	Beto (yellow card) 22' (goal) 56' (pen.); Itaparica (yellow card) 44'; Giovane 52', 89'; Leung Chi Wing (yellow card) 59'; Macallister 82'; Li Haiqiang (yellow card) 86'	Report	(yellow card) 16' Lo Chi Kwan; (yellow card) 22' Rubén; 31' Ip Chung Long; (red card) 62' Ngan Lok Fung; (yellow card) 63' Yago	Stadium: Sham Shui Po Sports Ground (Note: The match will be played at Sham Shui Po Sports Ground instead of Eastern Salon's home ground Shing Mun Valley Sports Ground.) (Capacity: 2,194); Attendance: 919; Referee: Ng Chiu Kok; Assistant referees: Lau Fong Hei, Sarao Amarjit Singh; Fourth official: Luk Kin Sun

26 January 2014 Postponed (Note: Due to the investigating on match-fixing, the HKFA 1st Division matches involving Tuen Mun and Happy Valley will be postponed with immediate effect for one month pending the result of a hearing to be scheduled as soon as possible and hopefully approximately 1 week to 10 days from now.)	Sunray Cave JC Sun Hei	Cancelled	Tuen Mun	Tsing Yi, New Territories
17:30 UTC+8				Stadium: Tsing Yi Sports Ground (Capacity: 1,500)

=== Round 12 ===
8 February 2014 Postponed (Note: Due to the investigating on match-fixing, the HKFA 1st Division matches involving Tuen Mun and Happy Valley will be postponed with immediate effect for one month. However, neither Club has proven its viability to the satisfaction of the Committee as questions raised by the Committee remain unanswered. Therefore, the Committee will give the Clubs one final opportunity to provide all of the information requested, in particular relating to their financial viability and governance structures and will meet again on 10 February to review the information. An Emergency Board Meeting of the HKFA is being arranged for 11 February. Therefore, matches of both clubs held before 11 February will be postponed.)	Tuen Mun	Cancelled	Sunray Cave JC Sun Hei	Tuen Mun, New Territories
14:30 UTC+8				Stadium: Tuen Mun Tang Shiu Kin Sports Ground (Capacity: 2,200)

8 February 2014	Sun Pegasus	1 – 2	Kitchee	Mong Kok, Kowloon
14:30 UTC+8	Raščić 5'; Wong Yim Kwan (yellow card) 53'; Deng Jinghuang (yellow card) 82'	Report	21' Recio; 72' Belencoso	Stadium: Mong Kok Stadium (Capacity: 6,680); Attendance: 2,101; Referee: Ng Chiu Kok; Assistant referees: Chow Chun Kit, Lam Nai Kei; Fourth official: Chan Ming Siu

9 February 2014	Royal Southern	3 – 2	Eastern Salon	Aberdeen, Hong Kong Island
14:30 UTC+8	Lo Chi Kwan (yellow card) 19'; Carril 36'; Chung Hon Chee 42'; Díaz (yellow card) 70'; Héctor (yellow card) 75'; Ip Chung Long 81' (yellow card) 83'	Report	64' (yellow card) 77' Li Haiqiang; (yellow card) 68' Liang Zicheng; 84' Clayton; (yellow card) 90+12' Leung Kwok Wai	Stadium: Aberdeen Sports Ground (Capacity: 4,000); Attendance: 468; Referee: Tong Kui Sum; Assistant referees: Cheng Oi Cho, Lui Siu Chuen; Fourth official: Sarao Amarjit Singh

9 February 2014 Postponed (Note: Due to the investigating on match-fixing, the HKFA 1st Division matches involving Tuen Mun and Happy Valley will be postponed with immediate effect for one month. However, neither Club has proven its viability to the satisfaction of the Committee as questions raised by the Committee remain unanswered. Therefore, the Committee will give the Clubs one final opportunity to provide all of the information requested, in particular relating to their financial viability and governance structures and will meet again on 10 February to review the information. An Emergency Board Meeting of the HKFA is being arranged for 11 February. Therefore, matches of both clubs held before 11 February will be postponed.)	Happy Valley	Cancelled	Biu Chun Rangers	Tai Po, New Territories
14:30 UTC+8				Stadium: Tai Po Sports Ground (Capacity: 3,000)

9 February 2014	I-Sky Yuen Long	3 – 1	Yokohama FC Hong Kong	Yuen Long, New Territories
17:30 UTC+8	Yuen Lap Cheung (yellow card) 33'; Souza (yellow card) 41' (goal) 90+4'; Marques (yellow card) 58'; Chiu Chun Kit (yellow card) 59'; Sandro 81' (pen.); Gustavo (yellow card) 86'; Cheung Tsz Kin (yellow card) 87'	Report	31' Leung Nok Hang; (yellow card) 43' Tan Chun Lok; (yellow card) 58' Yoshitake; (yellow card) 80' Park Tae-Hong	Stadium: Yuen Long Stadium (Capacity: 4,932); Attendance: 463; Referee: Ho Wai Sing; Assistant referees: Chan Ming Siu, Yu Kin Fung; Fourth official: Mok Kar Main

11 May 2014 Rescheduled (Note: As South China reach the second round of 2014 AFC Champions League qualifying play-off, they will face Thai Premier League club Chonburi on 9 February 2014 in Chonburi, Thailand. As a result, the match is postponed.)	South China	3 – 2	Citizen	So Kon Po, Hong Kong Island
14:30 UTC+8		Report		Stadium: Hong Kong Stadium (Capacity: 40,000); Attendance: 824; Referee: Luk Kin Sun; Assistant referees: Chow Chun Kit, Chan Shing Kin; Fourth official: Ng Chiu Kok

=== Round 13 ===
15 February 2014	Happy Valley	Cancelled	Citizen	Kowloon Bay, Kowloon
14:30 UTC+8				Stadium: Kowloon Bay Park (Note: The match will be played at Kowloon Bay Park instead of Happy Valley's home ground Siu Sai Wan Sports Ground and Tai Po Sports Ground.) (Capacity: 1,200)

15 February 2014	Kitchee	4–0	Royal Southern	Mong Kok, Kowloon
14:30 UTC+8	Alex 2'; Lam Ka Wai 19'; Dani 36'; Jordi 69'; Xu Deshuai (yellow card) 84'	Report	(yellow card) 13' Carril; (yellow card) 53' Che Runqiu; (yellow card) 64' Dieguito	Stadium: Mong Kok Stadium (Capacity: 6,680); Attendance: 869; Referee: Liu Kwok Man; Assistant referees: Lui Siu Chuen, Sarao Armanjit Singh; Fourth official: Ng Wai Hong

15 February 2014	South China	3–1	Yokohama FC Hong Kong	So Kon Po, Hong Kong Island
17:30 UTC+8	Kajkut (yellow card) 55' (goal) 64'; Sealy 89'; Barisic 90+2'	Report	45+1' Fukuda; (yellow card) 59' Wong Wai; (yellow card) 63' Leung Kwun Chung	Stadium: Hong Kong Stadium (Capacity: 40,000); Attendance: 961; Referee: Cheng Oi Cho; Assistant referees: Chow Chun Kit, Yau Ho Fai; Fourth official: Chan Ming Siu

16 February 2014	Tuen Mun	Cancelled	Sun Pegasus	Tuen Mun, New Territories
14:30 UTC+8				Stadium: Tuen Mun Tang Shiu Kin Sports Ground (Capacity: 2,200)

16 February 2014	Eastern Salon	3–4	Biu Chun Rangers	Mong Kok, Kowloon
14:30 UTC+8	Beto (yellow card) 17'; Diego 57'; Clayton 77'; Giovane (yellow card) 80'; Liang Zicheng 88'; Wong Chi Chung (yellow card) 90+1'	Report	(yellow card) 17' Schutz; (yellow card) 32' Chow Cheuk Fung; (yellow card) 41' (yellow-red card) 72' Joel; 48' (o.g.) Leung Chi Wing; 50' Chuck Yiu Kwok; 58' Miroslav; 63' Lam Hok Hei	Stadium: Mong Kok Stadium (Capacity: 6,680); Attendance: 902; Referee: Ng Kai Lam; Assistant referees: Chan Ming Siu, Yu Chun Sun; Fourth official: Yu Kin Fung

16 February 2014	Sunray Cave JC Sun Hei	3–3	I-Sky Yuen Long	Tsing Yi, New Territories
17:30 UTC+8	Kilama (yellow card) 5' (goal) 79'; Roberto (yellow card) 21'; Bouet 86'; Reinaldo (yellow card) 90'; Cheung Kwok Ming (yellow card) 90+2'; Chiu Chun Kit 90+4' (o.g.)	Report	30' Fujimoto; (yellow card) 45+3' Chiu Chun Kit; (yellow card) 67' Cheng King Ho; 76' Souza; 81' Fábio	Stadium: Tsing Yi Sports Ground (Capacity: 1,500); Attendance: 210; Referee: Luk Kin Sun; Assistant referees: Lau Fong Hei, Fok Pong Shing; Fourth official: Lui Siu Chuen

=== Round 14 ===
22 February 2014	Citizen	3–4	Sunray Cave JC Sun Hei	Tsing Yi, Kowloon
14:30 UTC+8	Festus (yellow card) 21' (yellow-red card) 51'; Boris Si 29'; Krasić 53'; Chan Hin Kwong (yellow card) 60'; Nakamura (yellow card) 78'; Hélio 90+7'	Report	35', 51' (pen.) Lugo; 46', 70' Bouet; (yellow card) 58' Zhang Jun; (yellow card) 86' Wong Chun Ho	Stadium: Tsing Yi Sports Ground (Capacity: 1,500); Attendance: 142; Referee: Ho Wai Sing; Assistant referees: Luk Kin Sun, Tang Hing Fu; Fourth official: Law Ming Leong

22 February 2014	Eastern Salon	2–2	Kitchee	Mong Kok, Kowloon
14:30 UTC+8	Liang Zicheng (yellow card) 30' (goal) 66'; Li Haiqiang (yellow card) 45' (goal) 46'	Report	(yellow card) 5' (goal) 56' Cascón; (yellow card) 30' Lo Kwan Yee; 49' Belencoso	Stadium: Mong Kok Stadium (Capacity: 6,680); Attendance: 1,518; Referee: Ng Kai Lam; Assistant referees: Cheng Oi Cho, Sarao Amarjit Singh; Fourth official: Law Bik Chi

22 February 2014	South China	2–2	Sun Pegasus	So Kon Po, Hong Kong Island
17:30 UTC+8	Tse 5' (yellow card) 32'; Lee Chi Ho (yellow card) 28'; João Emir (yellow card) 40'; Kajkut 80'	Report	6' Raščić; (yellow card) 45+3' Mbome; 90+6' Ranđelović; (yellow card) 90+6' Cesar	Stadium: Hong Kong Stadium (Capacity: 40,000); Attendance: 1,632; Referee: Liu Kwok Man; Assistant referees: Lam Nai Kei, Lui Siu Chuen; Fourth official: Lau Fong Hei

23 February 2014	Royal Southern	1–1	I-Sky Yuen Long	Aberdeen, Hong Kong Island
14:30 UTC+8	Carril (yellow card) 32'; Díaz (yellow card) 42' (goal) 63'; Chung Hon Chee (yellow card) 74'	Report	28' Fábio; (yellow card) 70' Cheung Chi Kin; (yellow card) 83' Cheng King Ho	Stadium: Aberdeen Sports Ground (Capacity: 4,000); Attendance: 305; Referee: Chan Ming Siu; Assistant referees: Lui Siu Chuen, Yu Chun Sun; Fourth official: Ho Wai Sing

23 February 2014	Happy Valley	Cancelled	Tuen Mun	Tai Po, New Territories
14:30 UTC+8				Stadium: Tai Po Sports Ground (Capacity: 3,000)

23 February 2014	Yokohama FC Hong Kong	4–1	Biu Chun Rangers	Tseung Kwan O, New Territories
17:30 UTC+8	Fukuda 9', 85'; Leung Nok Hang (yellow card) 12'; Yoshitake (yellow card) 30' (goal) 47'; Lau Cheuk Hin (yellow card) 65'; Wong Wai 87'	Report	(yellow card) 29' Law Hiu Chung; (yellow card) 30' (yellow-red card) 43' Liu Songwei; 32' Lam Hok Hei; (yellow card) 90+1' Chuck Yiu Kwok	Stadium: Tseung Kwan O Sports Ground (Capacity: 3,500); Attendance: 685; Referee: Ng Chiu Kok; Assistant referees: Lau Fong Hei, Fok Pong Shing; Fourth official: Luk Kin Sun

=== Round 15 ===
8 March 2014	Tuen Mun	Cancelled	Royal Southern	Tuen Mun, New Territories
14:30 UTC+8				Stadium: Tuen Mun Tang Shiu Kin Sports Ground (Capacity: 2,200)

8 March 2014	Eastern Salon	2–2	Citizen	Mong Kok, Kowloon
14:30 UTC+8	Tse Man Wing 24'; Diego (yellow card) 29'; Li Haiqiang (yellow card) 32'; Macallister (yellow card) 45+5'; Clayton (yellow card) 45+5'; Yiu Hok Man (yellow card) 52'; Giovane 61'	Report	28' Hélio; 40' Paulinho; 45+3' (yellow card) 45+5' Stefan; (yellow card) 45+5' Krasić; (yellow card) 57' Sham Kwok Fai; (yellow card) 69' Tam Lok Hin; (yellow card) 90+2' So Loi Keung	Stadium: Mong Kok Stadium (Capacity: 6,680); Attendance: 1,152; Referee: Tong Kui Sum; Assistant referees: Lau Fong Hei, Lam Nai Kei; Fourth official: Law Bik Chi

8 March 2014	Yokohama FC Hong Kong	Cancelled	Happy Valley	Tseung Kwan O, New Territories
17:30 UTC+8				Stadium: Tseung Kwan O Sports Ground (Capacity: 3,500)

8 March 2014 Rescheduled	I-Sky Yuen Long	2–2	South China	Yuen Long, New Territories
17:30 UTC+8	Sandro 5', 76'; Marques (yellow card) 43'; Gustavo (yellow card) 90+4'	Report	9' (yellow card) 67' Barisic; 23' (yellow card) 89' Dhiego	Stadium: Yuen Long Stadium (Capacity: 4,932); Attendance: 1,567; Referee: Ho Wai Sing; Assistant referees: Luk Kin Sun, Yu Chun Sun; Fourth official: Tang Hing Fu

9 March 2014	Biu Chun Rangers	1–4	Kitchee	Sham Shui Po, Kowloon
14:30 UTC+8	Aender (yellow card) 30'; Miroslav 47'; Liu Songwei (yellow card) 90+3'	Report	(yellow card) 14' Dani; 43' (yellow card) 66' Matt Lam; (yellow card) 58' Jang Kyung-Jin; 74', 79' Alex; 90+1' Jordi	Stadium: Sham Shui Po Sports Ground (Capacity: 2,194); Attendance: 681; Referee: Liu Kwok Man; Assistant referees: Chan Ming Siu, Sarao Amarjit Singh; Fourth official: Fong Kwok Hong

9 March 2014	Sun Pegasus	1–3	Sunray Cave JC Sun Hei	Mong Kok, Kowloon
17:30 UTC+8	So Wai Chuen (yellow card) 32'; Miović (yellow card) 45'; Deng Jinghuang (yellow card) 69'; Raščić 72'	Report	(yellow card) 8' Zhang Jun; 12' Lai Yiu Cheong; (yellow card) 50' Yuen Tsun Nam; 59' Reinaldo; 64' Lugo; (yellow card) 77' Su Yang; 79' Kilama	Stadium: Mong Kok Stadium (Capacity: 6,680); Attendance: 1,012; Referee: Ng Kai Lam; Assistant referees: Cheng Oi Cho, Fok Pong Shing; Fourth official: Yu Chun Sun

=== Round 16 ===
15 March 2014	Happy Valley	Cancelled	I-Sky Yuen Long	Tai Po, New Territories
14:30 UTC+8				Stadium: Tai Po ports Ground (Capacity: 3,000)

15 March 2014	Royal Southern	1–2	Sun Pegasus	Aberdeen, Hong Kong Island
14:30 UTC+8	Carril 37' (pen.) (yellow card) 87'; Ip Chung Long (yellow card) 55'; Chung Hong Chee (yellow card) 77'<>James Ha (yellow card) 90+4'	Report	(yellow card) 36' Škorić; (yellow card) 42' Mbome; 63' McKee; (yellow card) 86' Miović; 89' Ranđelović	Stadium: Aberdeen Sports Ground (Capacity: 4,000); Attendance: 526; Referee: Ho Wai Sing; Assistant referees: Chow Chun Kit, Yau Tsz Yeung; Fourth official: Tang Hing Fu

16 March 2014	Tuen Mun	Cancelled	Biu Chun Rangers	Tuen Mun, New Territories
14:30 UTC+8				Stadium: Tuen Mun Tang Shiu Kin Sports Ground (Capacity: 2,200)

16 March 2014	Eastern Salon	2–0	Yokohama FC Hong Kong	Mong Kok, Kowloon
14:30 UTC+8	Liang Zicheng (yellow card) 37' (goal) 85'; Giovane 47'; Tse Man Wing (yellow card) 58'; Beto (yellow card) 88'	Report	(yellow card) 10' Wong Wai; (yellow card) 25' Leung Kwun Chung; (yellow card) 70' Leung Nok Hang	Stadium: Mong Kok Stadium (Capacity: 6,680); Attendance: 1,055; Referee: Luk Kin Sun; Assistant referees: Chan Shui Hung, Yu Kin Fung; Fourth official: Lau Fong Hei

16 March 2014	Citizen	0–2	Kitchee	Tsing Yi, New Territories
17:30 UTC+8	Chan Hin Kwong (yellow card) 21'	Report	12' Cascón; 36' Annan; (yellow card) 57' Dani	Stadium: Tsing Yi Sports Ground (Capacity: 1,500); Attendance: 445; Referee: Tong Kui Sum; Assistant referees: Yu Chun Sun, Fok Pong Shing; Fourth official: Ho Wai Sing

6 May 2014 Rescheduled	Sunray Cave JC Sun Hei	0–0	South China	Mong Kok, Kowloon
14:30 UTC+8				Stadium: Mong Kok Stadium (Capacity: 6,680)

=== Round 17 ===
22 March 2014	Eastern Salon	4–2	Sunray Cave JC Sun Hei	Sham Shui Po, Kowloon
14:30 UTC+8	Cheng Siu Wai 27'; Li Haiqiang (yellow card) 28'; Giovane 33', 49', 74'; Clayton (yellow card) 85'; Leung Chi Wing (yellow card) 86'; Paulo (yellow card) 89'	Report	(yellow card) 57' Cheung Kwok Ming; 63' Reinaldo; 90+2' (o.g.) Leung Chi Wing; (yellow card) 90+2' Lai Yiu Cheong	Stadium: Sham Shui Po Sports Ground (Capacity: 2,194); Attendance: 936; Referee: Ho Wai Sing; Assistant referees: Chow Chun Kit, Yu Chun Sun; Fourth official: Lui Siu Chuen

22 March 2014	Tuen Mun	Cancelled	South China	Tuen Mun, New Territories
14:30 UTC+8				Stadium: Tuen Mun Tang Shiu Kin Sports Ground (Capacity: 2,200)

22 March 2014	Sun Pegasus	4–0	I-Sky Yuen Long	Mong Kok, Kowloon
17:30 UTC+8	Raščić 14' (pen.); Ranđelović (yellow card) 42'; So Wai Chuen 57'; Deng Jinghuang 62'; Yip Tsz Chun 76'	Report	(yellow card) 12' Mijanović; (yellow card) 27' Chan Ka Chun; (yellow card) 32' Cheung Chi Yung; (yellow card) 63' Fung Kai Hong	Stadium: Mong Kok Stadium (Capacity: 6,680); Attendance: 1,005; Referee: Chan Ming Siu; Assistant referees: Lam Nai Kei, Yau Ho Fai; Fourth official: Cheng Oi Cho

23 March 2014	Biu Chun Rangers	2–2	Citizen	Sham Shui Po, Kowloon
14:30 UTC+8	Chuck Yiu Kwok 3'; Schutz (yellow card) 7' (goal) 24'	Report	58' Detinho; 69' Festus	Stadium: Sham Shui Po Sports Ground (Capacity: 2,194); Attendance: 471; Referee: Ng Kai Lam; Assistant referees: Lau Fong Hei, Ng Wai Hong; Fourth official: Lo Yuk Ming

23 March 2014	Yokohama FC Hong Kong	2–2	Royal Southern	Tseung Kwan O, New Territories
14:30 UTC+8	Lau Cheuk Hin (yellow card) 30'; Leung Kwun Chung 54'; Fukuda 70'	Report	3' Yago; (yellow card) 50' Che Runqiu; 56' Rubén; (yellow card) 57' (yellow-red card) 85' Tan Chun Lok; (yellow card) 90+3' Diaz	Stadium: Tseung Kwan O Sports Ground (Capacity: 3,500); Attendance: 388; Referee: Ng Chiu Kok; Assistant referees: Luk Kin Sun, Lee Chung Yin; Fourth official: Wong Ping Chung

23 March 2014	Kitchee	Cancelled	Happy Valley	Mong Kok, Kowloon
17:30 UTC+8				Stadium: Mong Kok Stadium (Capacity: 6,680)

=== Round 18 ===
29 March 2014	Royal Southern	Cancelled	Happy Valley	Aberdeen, Hong Kong Island
14:30 UTC+8				Stadium: Aberdeen Sports Ground (Capacity: 4,000)

29 March 2014	Kitchee	Cancelled	Tuen Mun	Mong Kok, Kowloon
17:30 UTC+8				Stadium: Mong Kok Stadium (Capacity: 6,680)

30 March 2014	Sun Pegasus	5–2	Eastern Salon	Mong Kok, Kowloon
14:30 UTC+8	Yip Tsz Chun 2'; Tong Kin Man (yellow card) 10'; McKee (yellow card) 43' (goal) 45+1', 82'; Ju Yingzhi 48'; Raščić 53'; Škorić (yellow card) 76'; Wong Yim Kwan (yellow card) 85'	Report	(yellow card) 12' Tse Man Wing; (yellow card) 62' Macallister; 76' Giovane; 85' Beto	Stadium: Mong Kok Stadium (Capacity: 6,680); Attendance: 1,465; Referee: Ng Kai Lam; Assistant referees: Chow Chun Kit, Sarao Amarjit Singh; Fourth official: Tang Hing Fu

30 March 2014	Yokohama FC Hong Kong	1–3	Sunray Cave JC Sun Hei	Tseung Kwan O, New Territories
14:30 UTC+8	Park Tae-Hong (yellow card) 41'; Lew Wai Yip (yellow card) 48'; Au Yeung Yiu Chung (yellow card) 62' (goal) 81'	Report	4' Lai Yiu Cheong; 9' Kilama; (yellow card) 57' Roberto; (yellow card) 86' (goal) 90+2' Cheung Kwok Ming; (yellow card) 90' Mirko	Stadium: Tseung Kwan O Sports Ground (Capacity: 3,500); Attendance: 259; Referee: Lau Fong Hei; Assistant referees: Chan Ming Siu, Yu Chun Sun; Fourth official: Ng Chiu Kok

30 March 2014	I-Sky Yuen Long	2–1	Citizen	Mong Kok, Kowloon
17:30 UTC+8	Souza 3', 30'; Yan Wai Hong (yellow card) 50' (yellow-red card) 84'; Gustavo (yellow card) 82'	Report	(yellow card) 28' Sham Kwok Keung; (yellow card) 74' Stefan; 90' Fernando	Stadium: Mong Kok Stadium (Capacity: 6,680); Attendance: 680; Referee: Cheng Oi Cho; Assistant referees: Lui Siu Chuen, Fok Pong Shing; Fourth official: Lo Ka Fai

30 April 2014 Rescheduled	Biu Chun Rangers	2–1	South China	Mong Kok, Kowloon
16:00 UTC+8				Stadium: Mong Kok Stadium (Capacity: 6,680); Attendance: 568

=== Round 19 ===
5 April 2014 Rescheduled	Royal Southern	1–1	South China	Aberdeen, Hong Kong Island
12:30 UTC+8	Chung Hon Chee (yellow card) 28'; Yago (yellow card) 70'; Chow Ka Wa 71'; Carril (yellow card) 72'	Report	20' Weijl; (yellow card) 87' Chan Siu Kwan	Stadium: Aberdeen Sports Ground (Capacity: 4,000); Attendance: 512; Referee: Ng Chiu Kok; Assistant referees: Yau Ho Fai, Sarao Amarjit Singh; Fourth official: Lui Siu Chuen

5 April 2014	Tuen Mun	Cancelled	Eastern Salon	Tuen Mun, New Territories
14:30 UTC+8				Stadium: Tuen Mun Tang Shiu Kin Sports Ground (Capacity: 2,200)

5 April 2014	Sunray Cave JC Sun Hei	0–2	Kitchee	Tsing Yi, New Territories
17:30 UTC+8	Wong Chun Hin (yellow card) 17'; Kwok Wing Sun (yellow card) 28'; Su Yang (yellow card) 47'	Report	7' Dani; 90+1' Lam Ka Wai	Stadium: Tsing Yi Sports Ground (Capacity: 1,500); Attendance: 594; Referee: Tong Kui Sum; Assistant referees: Cheng Oi Cho, Ng Wai Hong; Fourth official: Law Bik Chi

6 April 2014	Biu Chun Rangers	0–1	I-Sky Yuen Long	Sham Shui Po, Kowloon
14:30 UTC+8	Schutz (yellow card) 31'; Luciano (yellow card) 47'; Chan Ming Kong (yellow card) 56'	Report	(yellow card) 18' (yellow-red card) 51' Cheung Chi Yung; 57' Souza; (yellow card) 90+5' Pang Tsz Kin	Stadium: Sham Shui Po Sports Ground (Capacity: 2,194); Attendance: 323; Referee: Ho Wai Sing; Assistant referees: Yu Chun Sun, Lee Chung Yin; Fourth official: Luk Kin Sun

6 April 2014	Yokohama FC Hong Kong	3–2	Citizen	Tseung Kwan O, New Territories
14:30 UTC+8	Tan Chun Lok (yellow card) 18'; Wong Wai (yellow card) 24'; Fukuda 40'; Leung Nok Hang 46'; Yoshitake (yellow card) 57'; Park Tae-Hong (yellow card) 68'; Tse Tak Him 78' (o.g.)	Report	(yellow card) 18' Festus; 57' Stefan; (yellow card) 61' Tam Lok Hin; 85' Makamura	Stadium: Tseung Kwan O Sports Ground (Capacity: 3,500); Attendance: 457; Referee: Lau Fong Hei; Assistant referees: Chow Chun Kit, Chan Shing Kin; Fourth official: Ng Chiu Kok

6 April 2014	Happy Valley	Cancelled	Sun Pegasus	Siu Sai Wan, Hong Kong Island
17:30 UTC+8				Stadium: Siu Sai Wan Sports Ground (Capacity: 12,000)

=== Round 20 ===
17 April 2014 Rescheduled	Kitchee	1–1	South China	Mong Kok, Kowloon
20:00 UTC+8	Wan Chun (yellow card) 12'; Cheung Kin Fung (yellow card) 35'; Tsang Kam To (yellow card) 64'; Cascón 74' (pen.); Matt Lam (yellow card) 80'	Report	62' (pen.) Dhiego	Stadium: Mong Kok Stadium (Capacity: 6,680); Attendance: 1,767; Referee: Tong Kui Sum; Assistant referees: Cheng Oi Cho, Luk Kin Sun; Fourth official: Tang Hing Fu

18 April 2014	I-Sky Yuen Long	Cancelled	Tuen Mun	Yuen Long, New Territories
14:30 UTC+8				Stadium: Yuen Long Stadium (Capacity: 4,932)

19 April 2014	Citizen	2–1	Royal Southern	Tsing Yi, New Territories
14:30 UTC+8	Festus 66' (pen.); Detinho 76'; Tam Lok Hin (yellow card) 78'	Report	(yellow card) 15' Lee Sze Ho; 22' Dieguito; (red card) 65' Rubén; (yellow card) 74' James Ha	Stadium: Tsing Yi Sports Ground (Capacity: 1,500); Attendance: 305; Referee: Ho Wai Sing; Assistant referees: Yu Chun Sun, Mok Ka Ming; Fourth official: Liu Kwok Man

19 April 2014	Sun Pegasus	2–0	Yokohama FC Hong Kong	Mong Kok, Kowloon
17:30 UTC+8	Ranđelović 20'; Raščić 30'; Yip Tsz Chun (yellow card) 66'; Miović (yellow card) 68'	Report	(yellow card) 62' Wong Wai; (yellow card) 68' Fukuda; (yellow card) 84' Ideguchi	Stadium: Mong Kok Stadium (Capacity: 6,680); Attendance: 1,159; Referee: Lau Fong Hei; Assistant referees: Cheng Oi Cho, Lam Nai Kei; Fourth official: Yau Tsz Yeung

20 April 2014	Happy Valley	Cancelled	Eastern Salon	Siu Sai Wan, Hong Kong Island
14:30 UTC+8				Stadium: Siu Sai Wan Sports Ground (Capacity: 12,000)

20 April 2014	Sunray Cave JC Sun Hei	1–2	Biu Chun Rangers	Tsing Yi, New Territories
17:30 UTC+8	Reinaldo 70'; Lai Yiu Cheong (yellow card) 73'; Roberto (yellow card) 86'	Report	6' Chao Pengfei; (yellow card) 24' Joel; 82' (yellow card) 83' (yellow-red card) 90+1' Schutz; (yellow card) 85' Chow Cheuk Fung; (yellow card) 90+1' Lam Hok Hei	Stadium: Tsing Yi Sports Ground (Capacity: 1,500); Attendance: 283; Referee: Liu Kwok Man; Assistant referees: Lui Siu Chuen, Chan Ming Siu; Fourth official: Tang Hing Fu

=== Round 21 ===
3 May 2014	Happy Valley	Cancelled	Sunray Cave JC Sun Hei	Tai Po, New Territories
14:30 UTC+8				Stadium: Tai Po Sports Ground (Capacity: 3,000)

3 May 2014	South China	4–2	Eastern Salon	So Kon Po, Hong Kong Island
14:30 UTC+8				Stadium: Hong Kong Stadium (Capacity: 40,000)

3 May 2014	Kitchee	3–1	I-Sky Yuen Long	Mong Kok, Kowloon
17:30 UTC+8				Stadium: Mong Kok Stadium (Capacity: 6,680)

4 May 2014	Biu Chun Rangers	1–1	Royal Southern	Sham Shui Po, Kowloon
14:30 UTC+8				Stadium: Sham Shui Po Sports Ground (Capacity: 2,194)

4 May 2014	Yokohama FC Hong Kong	Cancelled	Tuen Mun	Tseung Kwan O, New Territories
14:30 UTC+8				Stadium: Tseung Kwan O Sports Ground (Capacity: 3,500)

4 May 2014	Citizen	2–1	Sun Pegasus	Tsing Yi, New Territories
17:30 UTC+8				Stadium: Tsing Yo Sports Ground (Capacity: 1,500)

=== Round 22 ===
10 May 2014	Kitchee	4–1	Yokohama FC Hong Kong	Mong Kok, Kowloon
14:30 UTC+8				Stadium: Mong Kok Stadium (Capacity: 6,680)

10 May 2014	Citizen	Cancelled	Tuen Mun	Tsing Yi, New Territories
14:30 UTC+8				Stadium: Tsing Yi Sports Ground (Capacity: 1,500)

11 May 2014	Sun Pegasus	1–0	Biu Chun Rangers	Mong Kok, Kowloon
14:30 UTC+8				Stadium: Mong Kok Stadium (Capacity: 6,680)

11 May 2014	South China	Cancelled	Happy Valley	So Kon Po, Hong Kong Island
14:30 UTC+8				Stadium: Hong Kong Stadium (Capacity: 40,000)

11 May 2014	Eastern Salon	0–1	I-Sky Yuen Long	Tsuen Wan, New Territories
14:30 UTC+8				Stadium: Shing Mun Valley Sports Ground (Capacity: 5,000)

11 May 2014	Sunray Cave JC Sun Hei	2–3	Royal Southern	Tsing Yi, New Territories
14:30 UTC+8				Stadium: Tsing Yi Sports Ground (Capacity: 1,500)

== Season statistics ==
=== Top scorers ===
Rank	Player	Club	Goals
1	Giovane Silva	Eastern Salon	12
1	Admir Raščić	Sun Pegasus	12
3	Wellingsson de Souza	I-Sky Yuen Long	11
3	Juan Belencoso	Kitchee	11
3	Kenji Fukuda	Yokohama FC Hong Kong	11
6	Jordi Tarrés	Kitchee	7
7	Jonathan Carril	Southern	6
7	Michel Lugo	Sunray Cave JC Sun Hei	6

=== Hat-tricks ===
Player	For	Against	Result	Date
Giovane Alves da Silva	Eastern Salon	Sunray Cave JC Sun Hei	4–2	22 March 2014

The followings are not counted as matches involving Tuen Mun or Happy Valley are voided.

Admir Raščić	Sun Pegasus	Tuen Mun	6–0	26 October 2013
Jonathan Carril	Royal Southern	Happy Valley	4–2	30 November 2013
Juan Belencoso	Kitchee	Tuen Mun	5–0	30 November 2013
