= Feng Tao (footballer) =

Chinese footballer (born 1983)

Personal information
- Date of birth: 5 April 1985 (age 41)
- Place of birth: Qingdao, Shandong, China
- Height: 1.78 m (5 ft 10 in)
- Position: Midfielder

Senior career*
Years	Team	Apps	(Gls)
2012	Qingdao Jonoon	0	(0)
2013	Jiaozhou Fengfa		
2013	Tuen Mun SA	6	(0)
2014	Qingdao Huanghai Zhiyao		
2014–2015	Qingdao QUST		
2016–2019	Qingdao Red Lions		
2019–	Qingdao Kunpeng		
- * Club domestic league appearances and goals

Feng Tao (simplified Chinese: 冯涛; traditional Chinese: 馮濤; pinyin: Féng Tāo; born 17 February 1983) is a Chinese footballer.

== Career statistics ==
=== Club ===
As of 28 June 2019.

Club	Season	League			Cup		Continental		Other		Total	
Club	Season	Division	Apps	Goals	Apps	Goals	Apps	Goals	Apps	Goals	Apps	Goals
Qingdao Jonoon	2012	Chinese Super League	0	0	1 (Note: Appearances in the Chinese FA Cup)	0	–		0	0	1	0
Tuen Mun SA	2013–14	Hong Kong First Division	6	0	0	0	–		1 (Note: Appearances in the Hong Kong Senior Challenge Shield)	0	7	0
Career total			6	0	1	0	0	0	1	0	8	0
