= Yin Guangjun =

Chinese footballer

Yin Guangjun 尹广俊
Personal information
- Date of birth: October 22, 1992 (age 34)
- Place of birth: Qingdao, Shandong, China
- Height: 1.78 m (5 ft 10 in)
- Positions: Defender; midfielder

Team information
- Current team: Qingdao Great Star

Youth career
- Qingdao Hailifeng

Senior career*
Years	Team	Apps	(Gls)
2011	Guangzhou Youth	17	(0)
2012–2020	Qingdao Jonoon	32	(1)
2013	→ Tuen Mun (loan)	4	(0)
2021	Qingdao Youth Island	1	(0)
2022-	Qingdao Great Star	0	(0)
- * Club domestic league appearances and goals as of 20 May 2022

Yin Guangjun (Chinese: 尹广俊, born 22 October 1992 in Qingdao, Shandong) is a Chinese football player who currently plays for Chinese club Qingdao Great Star.

== Club career ==
Yin started his professional football career in 2011 when he was promoted to China League Two club Guangzhou Youth (Guangzhou Evergrande youth team). In 2012, Yin transferred to Chinese Super League side Qingdao Jonoon. On 29 April 2012, he made his debut for Qingdao Jonoon in the 2012 Chinese Super League against Guizhou Renhe, coming on as a substitute for Zhu Shiyu in the 25th minute.

== Career statistics ==
Statistics accurate as of match played 31 December 2020.

Appearances and goals by club, season and competition
Club	Season	League			National Cup		League Cup		Continental		Total	
Club	Season	Division	Apps	Goals	Apps	Goals	Apps	Goals	Apps	Goals	Apps	Goals
Guangzhou Youth	2011	China League Two	17	0	-		-		-		17	0
Qingdao Jonoon	2012	Chinese Super League	3	0	1	0	-		-		4	0
Qingdao Jonoon	2013	Chinese Super League	0	0	1	0	-		-		1	0
Qingdao Jonoon	2014	China League One	0	0	0	0	-		-		0	0
Qingdao Jonoon	2015	China League One	3	0	1	0	-		-		4	0
Qingdao Jonoon	2016	China League One	0	0	2	0	-		-		2	0
Qingdao Jonoon	2017	China League Two	1	0	1	0	-		-		2	0
Qingdao Jonoon	2018	China League Two	16	1	2	0	-		-		18	1
Qingdao Jonoon	2019	China League Two	5	0	3	0	-		-		8	0
Qingdao Jonoon	2020	China League Two	4	0	-		-		-		4	0
Qingdao Jonoon	Total		32	1	11	0	0	0	0	0	43	1
Tuen Mun	13–14	First Division	4	0	0	0	1 (Note: Appearance(s) in Hong Kong Senior Challenge Shield)	0	0	0	5	0
Career total			53	1	11	0	1	0	0	0	65	1
