= Àlex Gómez =

Spanish football manager

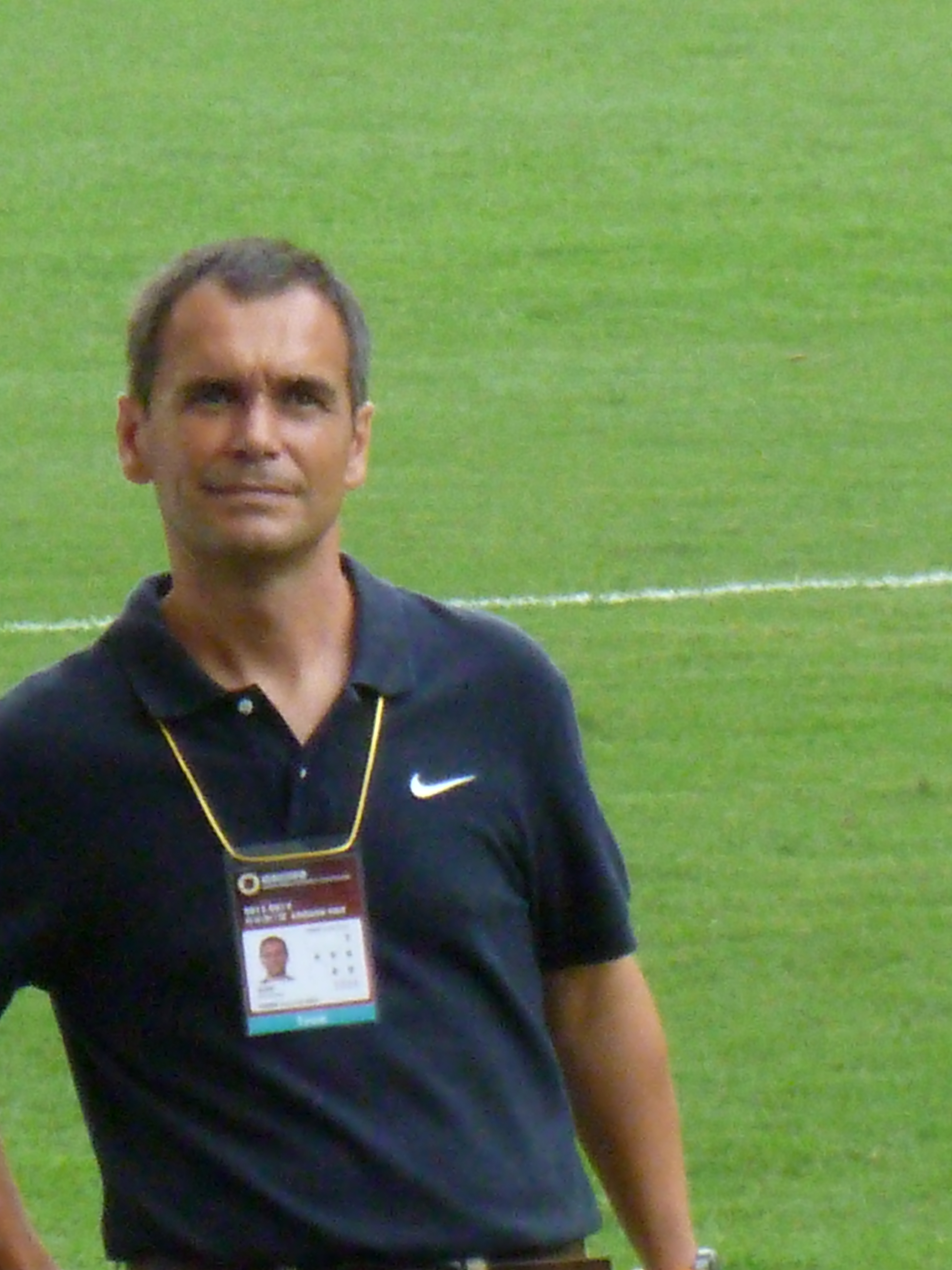

Personal information
- Full name: Alejandro Gómez Comes
- Date of birth: 8 October 1972 (age 54)
- Place of birth: L'Ametlla de Mar, Spain

Managerial career
- Years: Team
- 2007–2013: Barcelona (youth)
- 2013: Kitchee
- 2014: Ratchaburi
- 2015: Córdoba (talent manager)
- 2018: Ascó

Alejandro "Àlex" Gómez Comes, (born 8 October 1972) is a Spanish football manager.

Before starting his senior coaching career in Hong Kong, he has held various positions the youth academy of FC Barcelona.

== Coaching career ==
Born in L'Ametlla de Mar, Tarragona, Catalonia, Gómez started coaching at La Masia, the youth academy of FC Barcelona, in 2007.

In the summer of 2011, Gómez was appointed as the coach of Barça's Alevín C.

=== Kitchee ===
Gómez signed a 1-year contract with Hong Kong top-tier division club Kitchee on 21 May 2013, with his contract formally starts on 30 June 2013. His arrival to Kitchee was due to former coach Josep Gombau's departure to A-League club Adelaide United.

However, Gómez left Kitchee in November 2013.

== Managerial stats ==
Team	Nat	From	To	Record				
Team	Nat	From	To	P	W	D	L	Win %
Kitchee	Hong Kong	30 June 2013	15 November 2013	9	5	1	3	55.56
Total				9	5	1	3	55.56
