= Hu Jun (footballer) =

Chinese footballer

Hu Jun 胡俊
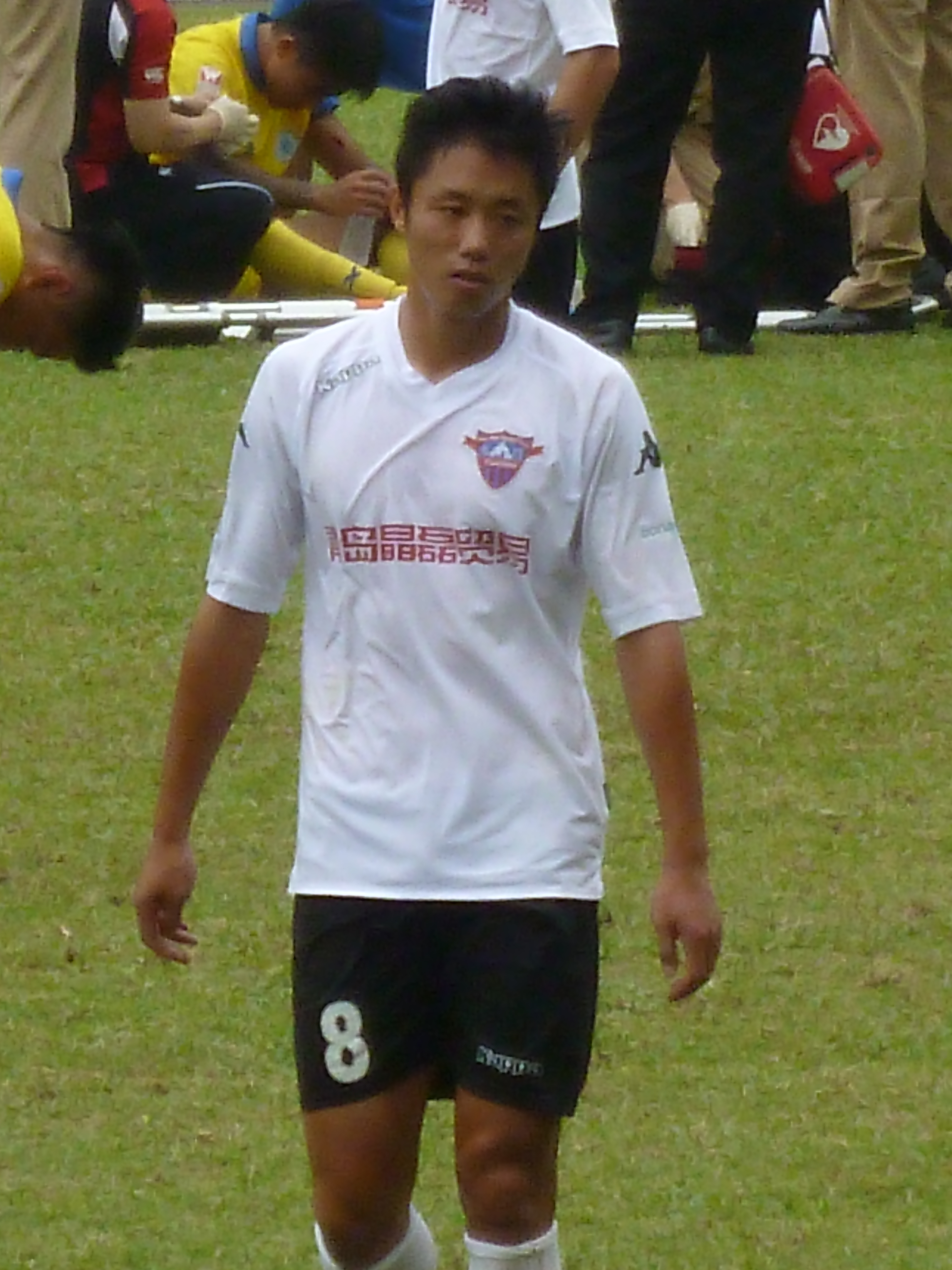

Personal information
- Full name: 胡俊
- Date of birth: January 24, 1985 (age 41)
- Place of birth: Qingdao, Shandong, China
- Height: 1.86 m (6 ft 1 in)
- Position: Midfielder

Youth career
- 2000–2006: Qingdao Jonoon

Senior career*
Years	Team	Apps	(Gls)
2007–2016	Qingdao Jonoon	85	(1)
2012	→ Varzim (loan)	4	(0)
2013	→ Tuen Mun (loan)	9	(0)
2016	→ Yinchuan Helanshan (loan)	17	(1)
2017	Yinchuan Helanshan	16	(0)
2018–2020	Qingdao Jonoon	33	(1)
- * Club domestic league appearances and goals as of 31 December 2020

Hu Jun (Simplified Chinese: 胡俊; born 24 January 1985 in Qingdao) is a Chinese football coach and former football player.

== Club career ==
Hu Jun would start his professional football career after he graduated from the various Qingdao Jonoon youth teams and make his debut on May 4, 2005 in a league game against Inter Shanghai in a 1-0 loss. During the season, he would make 3 further cameo appearances in the league, however it wasn't until the following league season that Hu Jun would start to establish himself as a club regular within the team when he made 13 league appearances. Established now as regualer member within the team he would eventually score his first senior club level goal on June 28, 2008 against Guangzhou Pharmaceutical, however his team lost 2-7.

On 25 January 2012, Hu Jun signed a half-year contract with Portuguese side Varzim S.C. and play in the remainder of the 2011–12 Segunda Divisão. Hu Jun would soon make his debut for his new club in a league game against F.C. Tirsense on February 5, 2012 in a 1-0 victory where he came on as a substitute. While he would only play in a handful of games Hu Jun would actually see Varzim lift the third tier title before he returned to China.

On 17 July 2013, Hu Jun joined Tuen Mun, alongside Qingdao Jonoon teammate Feng Tao, through the referral of Zola Kiniambi. This deal is a loan deal as Hu Jun is loaned from Qingdao Jonoon until the end of the season. In March 2016, Hu was loaned to China League Two side Yinchuan Helanshan until 31 December 2016.

Hu returned to Qingdao Jonoon in February 2018.

== Career statistics ==
Statistics accurate as of match played 31 December 2020.

Appearances and goals by club, season and competition
Club	Season	League			National Cup		League Cup		Continental		Total	
Club	Season	Division	Apps	Goals	Apps	Goals	Apps	Goals	Apps	Goals	Apps	Goals
Qingdao Jonoon	2004	Chinese Super League	0	0			-		-		0	0
Qingdao Jonoon	2005	Chinese Super League	4	0			-		-		4	0
Qingdao Jonoon	2006	Chinese Super League	13	0			-		-		13	0
Qingdao Jonoon	2007	Chinese Super League	10	0	-		-		-		10	0
Qingdao Jonoon	2008	Chinese Super League	13	1	-		-		-		13	1
Qingdao Jonoon	2009	Chinese Super League	16	0	-		-		-		16	0
Qingdao Jonoon	2010	Chinese Super League	4	0	-		-		-		4	0
Qingdao Jonoon	2011	Chinese Super League	1	0	1	0	-		-		2	0
Qingdao Jonoon	2012	Chinese Super League	1	0	1	0	-		-		2	0
Qingdao Jonoon	2013	Chinese Super League	7	0	0	0	-		-		7	0
Qingdao Jonoon	2014	China League One	15	0	0	0	-		-		15	0
Qingdao Jonoon	2015	China League One	1	0	1	0	-		-		2	0
Qingdao Jonoon	Total		85	1	3	0	0	0	0	0	88	1
Varzim (loan)	2011–12	Segunda Divisão	4	0	0	0	-		-		4	0
Tuen Mun (loan)	2013–14	Hong Kong First Division League	9	0	0	0	0 (Note: Appearance(s) in Hong Kong Senior Challenge Shield)	0	-		9	0
Yinchuan Helanshan (loan)	2016	China League Two	17	1	2	0	-		-		19	1
Yinchuan Helanshan	2017	China League Two	16	0	1	0	-		-		17	0
Qingdao Jonoon	2018	China League Two	17	0	1	0	-		-		18	0
Qingdao Jonoon	2019	China League Two	16	1	1	0	-		-		17	1
Qingdao Jonoon	Total		33	1	2	0	0	0	0	0	35	1
Career total			164	3	8	0	0	0	0	0	172	3
