= Guy Madjo =

Cameroonian footballer

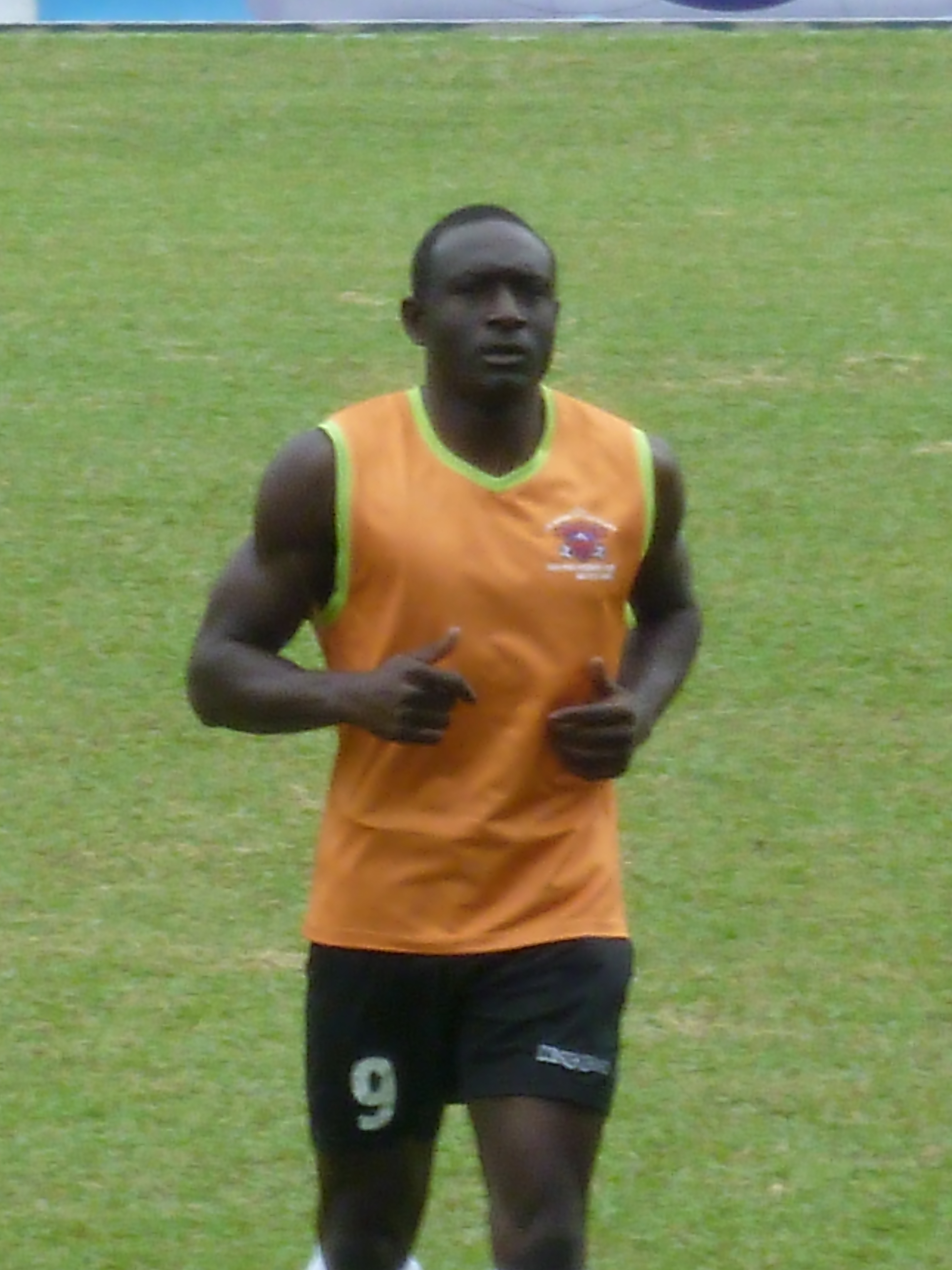
- Madjo pictured training with Tuen Mun SA in September 2013.

Personal information
- Full name: Guy Bertrand Madjo
- Date of birth: 1 June 1984 (age 42)
- Place of birth: Douala, Cameroon
- Height: 6 ft 0 in (1.83 m)
- Position: Striker

Youth career
- PMUC Douala

Senior career*
Years	Team	Apps	(Gls)
2004–2005	Petersfield Town	11	(12)
2005	Bristol City	5	(0)
2005–2006	→ Forest Green Rovers (loan)	6	(5)
2006	Forest Green Rovers	18	(4)
2006–2007	Stafford Rangers	42	(12)
2007–2008	Crawley Town	18	(11)
2007–2008	→ Cheltenham Town (loan)	5	(0)
2008	Shrewsbury Town	15	(3)
2009	Guangdong Sunray Cave	18	(10)
2010–2011	Bylis Ballsh	15	(2)
2011–2012	Stevenage	1	(0)
2011–2012	→ Port Vale (loan)	6	(4)
2012–2013	Aldershot Town	23	(8)
2012	→ Plymouth Argyle (loan)	14	(3)
2013	Macclesfield Town	8	(2)
2013	Tuen Mun SA	5	(2)
2014	Looktabfah		
2014–2015	Tranmere Rovers	2	(0)
Total		212	(78)

International career
- Cameroon U17
2008	Cameroon U23	1	(0)
- * Club domestic league appearances and goals

Guy Bertrand Madjo (born 1 June 1984) is a Cameroonian former footballer who played as a striker.

Madjo began his career in Cameroon before moving to England in 2005 with Petersfield Town, earning a move to Bristol City in August 2005. After limited appearances, he joined Forest Green Rovers and later Stafford Rangers. In 2007, he signed for Crawley Town, where his goal-scoring form attracted Football League interest, leading to spells with Cheltenham Town and Shrewsbury Town.

He later played abroad in China (Guangdong Sunray Cave) and Albania (KF Bylis Ballsh) before returning to England with Stevenage, followed by moves to Port Vale, Aldershot Town, Plymouth Argyle, and Macclesfield Town. After further spells in Hong Kong (Tuen Mun SA) and Thailand (Looktabfah), he returned to England with Tranmere Rovers. In 2016, he was sentenced to three years in prison for sexual assault.

== Club career ==
=== Early career ===
Madjo played for hometown club PMUC Douala before moving to England and signing with Petersfield Town of the Wessex League. He scored 12 goals in 11 games during the 2004–05 season before captivating the attention of some higher league clubs. He had a trial at both Stoke City and Port Vale, and impressed Stoke manager Johan Boskamp and Vale manager Martin Foyle, but left Stoke-on-Trent after only being offered non-contract terms at Port Vale. In August 2005, Madjo went on trial with Bristol City, playing for the reserve team in a 3–0 defeat against Cheltenham Town. He scored two goals in three reserve games for the club. Madjo was without a work permit and subsequently could not sign a contract with Bristol City until a decision was made as to whether his work permit application would be accepted. Having trialled with Bristol City for three weeks without pay, Madjo was offered a trial by Argentine Primera División side Boca Juniors. However, a day before he was due to fly out to Argentina, he was granted a work permit, and subsequently signed for Bristol City on a free transfer. Madjo made his Bristol City debut in the club's first away win of the 2005–06 season, playing 86 minutes in their 3–2 win at Brentford. He played a further five times for Bristol City, scoring once in a 3–2 Football League Trophy defeat at Barnet – scoring just six minutes after coming on as a substitute.

=== Forest Green Rovers ===
Having made only a handful of appearances under new manager Gary Johnson, Madjo joined Conference National side Forest Green Rovers on loan, with a view to a permanent move, in November 2005. Madjo made his debut for Forest Green a day after signing for the club, coming on as a substitute for Zema Abbey in the club's 2–0 away loss to eventual champions Accrington Stanley. He scored his first goal for the club a week later, scoring the first goal of the game in a 2–1 away loss at Aldershot Town, a game in which Madjo was also sent off in. The sending off meant that Madjo missed the club's next three games, returning to the first team a month later, on 26 December 2005, scoring a late equaliser as a substitute in Forest Green's 2–2 home draw with Hereford United. Four days later, he scored twice against Aldershot in a 4–2 home win, before scoring his fifth goal in four games in a 1–1 away draw at Hereford. Following a successful loan spell, scoring five goals in six games, Madjo signed for the club permanently on 13 January 2006, signing a contract until the end of the 2005–06 season. In his first game after signing permanently for the club, Madjo scored twice in a 5–0 victory against Altrincham. He scored nine goals for Forest Green, playing 24 games for the club.

=== Stafford Rangers ===
Forest Green were unable to offer Madjo an extended contract at the end of the season as the player "was out of the country". Shortly before the 2006–07 campaign, on 8 August 2006, Madjo joined newly-promoted Conference National side Stafford Rangers. He was the first ever full-time player at Stafford Rangers. Madjo made his debut four days later in a 1–1 draw away at Grays Athletic. He scored the winning goal in the club's following fixture, a 1–0 home win against Altrincham – firing the ball high into the net in the 81st minute after connecting with Dolapo Olaoye's cross. Madjo failed to find the net again until 10 October 2006, scoring in Stafford's 4–1 away win at Gravesend & Northfleet. Four days later, he was on hand to score the only goal of the game in the 8th minute in a 1–0 win victory against Woking, scoring from 18 yards (16 m) out. A month later, Madjo scored his fourth goal of the 2006–07 campaign in a 3–1 defeat at Halifax Town, before scoring a week later in a 2–2 home draw against St Albans City. Madjo failed to find the scoresheet for two months before scoring a consolation strike in a 3–1 home loss to Morecambe on 27 January 2007, with the visitors 3–0 up Madjo struck a "superb 20-yard volley" past Morecambe goalkeeper Steven Drench. He went a further nine games without a goal, ending his goal drought in a 4–2 win against Grays Athletic on 24 March 2007. Three days later, he scored a crucial winner in a 1–0 away win at Altrincham, scoring with a header from Nathan Talbott's driven cross. A brace away at Aldershot Town in a 4–2 defeat meant that Madjo had taken his goal tally into double figures, scoring two first-half goals with close-range finishes. Madjo scored both goals in Stafford's 2–0 home win against Northwich Victoria on 17 April 2007, the win all but secured Stafford's Conference National status for another season. He scored 12 times for Stafford in 45 appearances.

=== Crawley Town ===
Madjo joined Crawley Town on 28 June 2007, signing alongside Jon-Paul Pittman and Tyrone Thompson. He scored twice on his debut in Crawley's first game of the 2007–08 season, a 2–1 home win against Stevenage. The following week, Madjo scored again, this time in a 4–1 away loss at Salisbury City. In September 2007, Madjo scored in five consecutive fixtures, including a brace in a 5–3 home win against Woking. He also scored twice within the space of a week in October 2007, scoring in away fixtures against Kidderminster Harriers and Weymouth respectively. Madjo had scored 11 goals in 18 games, which prompted speculation regarding a move into the Football League. Madjo said, "It is nice to have people say good things about you but at the moment I'm not thinking about other clubs. All I think about is doing my job and doing my best for Crawley". On 21 November 2007, four days after earning a call up to the Cameroon squad, Madjo joined League One side Cheltenham Town on a one-month loan, with a view to a permanent move. On Madjo's departure, Crawley Town manager Steve Evans said "As a manager, I'm extremely disappointed. As a club, we always knew this day would come. He's an exceptional talent and a model professional". Madjo made his Cheltenham debut on 25 November 2007, coming on as a 77th-minute substitute in Cheltenham's "shock" 1–0 home victory over Leeds United. He started his first game three weeks later, a 1–0 win against Luton Town. During his one-month loan spell, Madjo made five appearances for Cheltenham. Despite impressing Cheltenham manager Keith Downing, the club opted against buying the player permanently as a result of Downing having more funds at his disposal – "Madjo had done nothing but impress all those at Cheltenham, but thanks to the extra money made available to Keith Downing, Cheltenham have set their requirements higher".

=== Shrewsbury Town ===
In January 2008, Madjo signed for Shrewsbury Town for £20,000. Madjo made his debut a day after signing for the club, playing the whole game as Shrewsbury lost 3–1 at rivals Hereford United. He scored his first goal for the club in Shrewsbury's following game, scoring "with a fierce left-foot low drive" to double Shrewsbury's lead in a 2–0 win against Morecambe. Madjo scored again the following week, giving ten-man Shrewsbury the lead away at Grimsby Town in a game that ended 1–1. He went five games without a goal before scoring in a 4–1 defeat at Barnet. He made 15 appearances for the club during the second half of the 2007–08 season, scoring three goals. In July 2008, Madjo was told that he did not figure in new manager Paul Simpson's immediate plans, being left behind as the club travelled to Spain on a pre-season training camp. After failing to make a single appearance in the first four months of the 2008–09 season, his contract was terminated on 4 December 2008.

=== China and Albania ===
Following his release from Shrewsbury, Madjo opted to move abroad, signing for Chinese League One side Guangdong Sunray Cave on a free transfer. He made 18 league appearances for the club, scoring ten goals. He finished the 2009 campaign as the club's top goalscorer and fifth in the overall goalscoring charts. The following season, Madjo signed for Albanian Superliga side KF Bylis Ballsh. He made his debut for the club in a 3–2 defeat to Vllaznia Shkodër on 22 August 2010, playing the whole 90 minutes. Madjo scored his first goal for the club on 30 October 2010, netting in the first minute of the match as Bylis beat Besa Kavajë 3–1. He also scored a last-minute winner in the club's 3–2 home win against Shkumbini Peqin in November 2010. Madjo was given a straight red card in the club's 2–1 defeat to KS Kastrioti on 24 December 2010. It was to be Madjo's last game for Bylis. He later said, "I felt that Bylis Ballsh did not respect my contract, so I sat down with the club and cancelled my contract." He made 15 appearances for the Albanian side, scoring twice.

=== Stevenage ===
In June 2011, it was announced that Madjo had joined League One side Stevenage on a free transfer. He signed a one-year contract with the club. Stevenage manager Graham Westley had previously tried to sign Madjo ahead of the 2008–09 season. Still, the player instead opted to seek a move abroad. On signing for Stevenage, Madjo said "I have met the players at Stevenage, I really like the team and the way they looked after me when I arrived. I’m really looking forward to the new season and hope to score lots of goals for my new club". In July 2011, Westley stated that the signing of Madjo had been held up by an "administrative hitch", and that there was a delay in transferring his registration — "There are a couple of issues that need sorting out with his former club, but I'm hopeful that will resolve itself in the coming days". Stevenage announced that they had received international clearance for Madjo on 22 July. Madjo was not involved in any of Stevenage's first ten fixtures of the 2011–12 season, although he was an unused substitute in a 4–3 defeat to Peterborough United in the League Cup on 9 August 2011. After scoring in a reserve match against Oxford United, Madjo made his first appearance of the season three days later, on 24 September, coming on as a second-half substitute in a 1–0 loss to Carlisle United at Brunton Park.

==== Port Vale (loan) ====
After making just one substitute appearance for Stevenage, Madjo joined League Two side Port Vale on loan on 24 November 2011. He aimed to "prove himself" at the club, having previously had a trial at Vale Park before he turned professional at Bristol City in 2005. He made his debut for the club a day after signing, playing 80 minutes in a 0–0 home draw against Torquay United; he was praised for his performance despite being 'rusty' and short of match fitness. In his second appearance for the club, he scored only his fourth league goal in the Football League, as he "displayed quick feet, an assured touch and deadly instincts in front of goal" to net the winning goal of a 2–1 victory at Dagenham & Redbridge. He dedicated the goal to coach Geoff Horsfield, after the pair spent many hours on the training ground working on Madjo's finishing skills. For his performance, Madjo was named on the League Two Team of the Week. He scored a 60-minute hat-trick in his third appearance for the club, a 4–0 home win over Aldershot Town; despite this he stated that "I didn't play that well in the first half. I feel I can give a lot more." For this achievement he was named on the League Two Team of the Week for a second time. He returned to Broadhall Way in January having scored four goals in six games for Port Vale, who were unable to extend the loan deal due to an acute lack of funds.

=== Aldershot Town ===
Madjo joined League Two side Aldershot Town for an "undisclosed five-figure fee" on 20 January 2012. Having secured Madjo on a contract running until summer 2013, manager Dean Holdsworth stated that "He will fit in very well. He is a strong lad who is well focussed too. He has a genuine appetite to score goals. We know he can score goals and that is what we need." He opened his account with the only goal of the game against Hereford United at the Recreation Ground on 14 February, to give the "Shots" their first home win in two months.

He started the 2012–13 season on the Aldershot bench. On 8 September, Madjo signed an emergency four-week loan deal with Plymouth Argyle. He opened his account for the "Pilgrims" on 2 October, when he netted the equalising goal in a 1–1 draw with Wycombe Wanderers at Adams Park. During his time at Home Park, he admitted that he was worried by the form of his parent club Aldershot, who slipped into the relegation zone in his absence. He was dropped from the first-team by manager Carl Fletcher, despite being a "model pro" for a Plymouth team struggling for goals and low on strikers. He left Aldershot in January 2013, and began training with Bristol Rovers.

=== Macclesfield Town ===
Madjo joined Conference National side Macclesfield Town in March 2013. He made his debut for the club two days after signing, as an 80th-minute substitute in Macclesfield's 2–1 home victory over lowly AFC Telford United. It took Madjo seven games to open his goalscoring account, and it came in Macclesfield's penultimate game of the campaign, in an entertaining 5–4 defeat away to Woking. A week later, on 20 April 2013, he ended the campaign by scoring a "30-yard stunner" to help earn Macclesfield a 2–1 win against Cambridge United at Moss Rose, ending the club's five-match losing streak in the process.

=== Tuen Mun SA and Looktabfah ===
In September 2013, Madjo joined Hong Kong First Division League club Tuen Mun SA for the 2013–14 season. However, he stayed at the club for two months, scoring two goals in five league games. He later played for Looktabfah in the Thai Regional League Central & Western Division.

=== Tranmere Rovers ===
Madjo joined Tranmere Rovers on a two-month contract on 19 November 2014 after being signed by Micky Adams, his former manager at Port Vale. He left Prenton Park six weeks later, having only made three substitute appearances. He was reported to have played for teams in Gabon in 2015.

== International career ==
In November 2007, Madjo earned a call-up to play for Cameroon after Samuel Eto'o was forced to withdraw following a thigh injury. He had previously played for the under-17 side. Madjo was also named in the provisional Cameroon U23 squad ahead of the 2008 Olympics in Beijing. He joined the Cameroon U23 squad in France for a training camp in June 2008 and played in a 0–0 draw against Japan U23. However, he was ultimately not selected as part of the final squad.

== Personal life ==
Madjo is the father of the footballer Brian Madjo.

== Sexual assault conviction ==
In January 2016, Madjo was put on trial in his absence for sexual assault after an incident in his home in Grayshott on 17 August 2014; he was found guilty and sentenced to three and a half years, though he was believed to be somewhere in West Africa and unwilling to return to the UK.

== Career statistics ==
Appearances and goals by club, season and competition
Club	Season	League			National cup (Note: Includes FA Cup, Chinese FA Cup, Albanian Cup)		League cup (Note: Includes Football League Cup)		Other^{[A]}		Total	
Club	Season	Division	Apps	Goals	Apps	Goals	Apps	Goals	Apps	Goals	Apps	Goals
Petersfield Town	2004–05	Wessex League	11	12	0	0	—		0	0	11	12
Bristol City	2005–06	League One	5	0	0	0	0	0	1	1	6	1
Forest Green Rovers	2005–06	Conference National	24	9	0	0	—		0	0	24	9
Stafford Rangers	2006–07	Conference National	42	12	3	0	—		1	0	46	12
Crawley Town	2007–08	Conference National	18	11	0	0	—		0	0	18	11
Cheltenham Town (loan)	2007–08	League One	5	0	—		—		—		5	0
Shrewsbury Town	2007–08	League Two	15	3	—		—		—		15	3
Shrewsbury Town	2008–09	League Two	0	0	0	0	0	0	0	0	0	0
Shrewsbury Town	Total		15	3	0	0	0	0	0	0	15	3
Guangdong Sunray Cave	2009	China League One	18	10	—		—		—		18	10
KS Bylis Ballsh	2010–11	Kategoria Superiore	15	2	0	0	—		0	0	15	2
Stevenage	2011–12	League One	1	0	0	0	0	0	0	0	1	0
Port Vale (loan)	2011–12	League Two	6	4	—		—		—		6	4
Aldershot Town	2011–12	League Two	20	8	—		—		—		20	8
Aldershot Town	2012–13	League Two	3	0	0	0	0	0	0	0	3	0
Aldershot Town	Total		23	8	0	0	0	0	0	0	23	8
Plymouth Argyle (loan)	2012–13	League Two	14	3	0	0	—		0	0	14	3
Macclesfield Town	2012–13	Conference National	8	2	0	0	—		0	0	8	2
Tranmere Rovers	2014–15	League Two	2	0	1	0	—		0	0	3	0
Career totals^{[B]}			207	76	4	0	0	0	2	1	213	77

A. The "Other" column constitutes appearances and goals (including those as a substitute) in the FA Trophy and Football League Trophy.
B. The final totals do not include appearances and goals for Tuen Mun SA and Looktabfah.
