= List of Hong Kong football transfers summer 2013 =

This is a list of Hong Kong football transfers for the 2013 summer transfer window. Only moves featuring at least one First Division club are listed.

The summer transfer window was open from 12 July 2013 to 3 October 2013.

This list also includes transfers featuring at least one First Division club which were completed after the end of the winter 2012–13 transfer window and before the end of the 2013 summer window.

Players without a club may join at any time, and clubs may sign players on loan during loan windows.

== Transfers ==
All players and clubs without a flag are Hongkonger.

Date	Name	Moving from	Moving to	Fee
18 May 2013	Lam Hok Hei	Biu Chun Rangers	(Indonesia) Persija Jakarta	Loan
19 May 2013^{[a]}	(Spain) Jonathan Carril	Kitchee	Royal Southern	Free
24 May 2013	(Spain) José María Díaz Muñoz	Sunray Cave JC Sun Hei	(Thailand) Roi Et United	Free
26 May 2013^{[a]}	(Brazil) Giovane Alves da Silva	Biu Chun Rangers	Eastern Salon	Free
29 May 2013^{[a]}	(Spain) Yago González	Kitchee	Royal Southern	Free
29 May 2013^{[a]}	Chow Cheuk Fung	Tuen Mun	Biu Chun Rangers	Loan
30 May 2013^{[a]}	Xu Deshuai	Sun Pegasus	Kitchee	Undisclosed
30 May 2013^{[a]}	To Hon To	Wofoo Tai Po	Kitchee	Free
30 May 2013^{[a]}	Cheng King Ho	Biu Chun Rangers	I-Sky Yuen Long	Free
31 May 2013^{[a]}	(Brazil) João Emir Porto Pereira	Free agent	South China	Free
31 May 2013^{[a]}	(Brazil) Aender Naves Mesquita	Wofoo Tai Po	South China	Free
31 May 2013^{[a]}	(Brazil) Gustavo Claudio da Silva	Citizen	I-Sky Yuen Long	Free
31 May 2013^{[a]}	(Brazil) Alessandro Leonardo	Citizen	I-Sky Yuen Long	Free
1 June 2013	Jing Teng	Wofoo Tai Po	Sunray Cave JC Sun Hei	Free
1 June 2013	Pak Wing Chak	Sunray Cave JC Sun Hei	Eastern Salon	Free
1 June 2013	Leung Tsz Chun	Sunray Cave JC Sun Hei	Eastern Salon	Free
1 June 2013	Zhang Chunhui	Sunray Cave JC Sun Hei	South China	Undisclosed
1 June 2013	(Spain) Héctor Granado Gómez	(Spain) CF Palencia	Royal Southern	Free
2 June 2013	Lau Nim Yat	Biu Chun Rangers	Eastern Salon	Free
2 June 2013	Li Hon Ho	Wofoo Tai Po	Eastern Salon	Free
2 June 2013	(Brazil) Clayton Michel Afonso	Wofoo Tai Po	Eastern Salon	Free
2 June 2013	Chan Siu Yuen	Biu Chun Rangers	Citizen	Free
3 June 2013	(Montenegro) Čedomir Mijanović	Yokohama FC Hong Kong	I-Sky Yuen Long	Free
3 June 2013	Cheung Chi Yung	Sunray Cave JC Sun Hei	I-Sky Yuen Long	Free
3 June 2013	Chow Ki	Sun Pegasus	I-Sky Yuen Long	Free
3 June 2013	Chiu Chun Kit	Citizen	I-Sky Yuen Long	Loan
3 June 2013	Liu Fu Yuen	Citizen	I-Sky Yuen Long	Free
5 June 2013	Li Hang Wui	Sunray Cave JC Sun Hei	Yokohama FC Hong Kong	Undisclosed
5 June 2013	Yeung Chi Lun	Sunray Cave JC Sun Hei	Happy Valley	Free
6 June 2013	Michael Campion	Citizen	Sun Pegasus	Undisclosed
7 June 2013	(China) Yuan Yang	Citizen	Sun Pegasus	Undisclosed
7 June 2013	Au Yeung Yiu Chung	South China	Yokohama FC Hong Kong	Free
7 June 2013	Li Shu Yeung	Wofoo Tai Po	Yokohama FC Hong Kong	Free
7 June 2013	Cheung King Wah	Sunray Cave JC Sun Hei	Yokohama FC Hong Kong	Undisclosed
8 June 2013	Lai Ka Fai	Mutual	Biu Chun Rangers	Free
8 June 2013	Chan Cham Hei	South China	Biu Chun Rangers	Free
8 June 2013	Julius Akosah	Biu Chun Rangers	Happy Valley	Undisclosed
8 June 2013	(Cameroon) Wilfred Bamnjo	Biu Chun Rangers	Happy Valley	Undisclosed
8 June 2013	Pang Tsz Kin	Wofoo Tai Po	Happy Valley	Free
8 June 2013	Cheng Chi Wing	Royal Southern	Happy Valley	Undisclosed
8 June 2013	Wong Yim Kwan	Wofoo Tai Po	Happy Valley	Free
8 June 2013	Yan Pak Long	Wing Yee	Happy Valley	Free
8 June 2013	To Philip Michael	Royal Southern	Happy Valley	Undisclosed
8 June 2013	Chu Ka Chun	Yokohama FC Hong Kong	Happy Valley	Undisclosed
9 June 2013	(Nigeria) Alex Tayo Akande	Wofoo Tai Po	Kitchee	Free
9 June 2013	(Ghana) Christian Annan	Wofoo Tai Po	Kitchee	Free
9 June 2013	Chan Ming Kong	Unattached	Biu Chun Rangers	Free
11 June 2013	(Brazil) Diego Eli Moreira	Tuen Mun	Eastern Salon	Free
11 June 2013	Wong Chin Hung	Biu Chun Rangers	Eastern Salon	Free
11 June 2013	(Brazil) Itaparica	South China	Eastern Salon	Free
11 June 2013	Li Haiqiang	Tuen Mun	Eastern Salon	Free
11 June 2013	Man Pei Tak	South China	Eastern Salon	Free
11 June 2013	Tse Man Wing	Royal Southern	Eastern Salon	Free
11 June 2013	(Brazil) Beto	Tuen Mun	Eastern Salon	Free
11 June 2013	Leung Kwok Wai	Yokohama FC Hong Kong	Eastern Salon	Free
11 June 2013	Kwok Wing Sun	Tuen Mun	Eastern Salon	Undisclosed
11 June 2013	(Brazil) Paulo César da Silva Argolo	(Brazil) Novo Hamburgo	Eastern Salon	Free
11 June 2013	Chan Siu Kwan	Yokohama FC Hong Kong	South China	Undisclosed
12 June 2013	(Guinea) Mamadou Barry	Sunray Cave JC Sun Hei	South China	Free
13 June 2013	(Canada) Landon Ling	Kitchee	Sun Pegasus	Undisclosed
14 June 2013	Lee Chi Ho	South China	(China) Beijing Guoan	Free
16 June 2013	Cheung Yu Sum	Citizen	I-Sky Yuen Long	Free
17 June 2013	Lui Man Tik	Kitchee	Sunray Cave JC Sun Hei	Loan
17 June 2013	James Ha	Kitchee	Sunray Cave JC Sun Hei	Loan
17 June 2013	Leung Ka Hai	Kitchee	Sunray Cave JC Sun Hei	Loan
17 June 2013	Ngan Lok Fung	Kitchee	Royal Southern	Loan
17 June 2013	Fung Kai Hong	Sun Pegasus	I-Sky Yuen Long	Free
17 June 2013	(Brazil) Wellingsson de Souza	Unattached	I-Sky Yuen Long	Free
18 June 2013	Cheng Siu Wai	Kitchee	Eastern Salon	Undisclosed
20 June 2013	Wong Tsz Him	Biu Chun Rangers	Sunray Cave JC Sun Hei	Undisclosed
20 June 2013	Chan Ho Fung	Kitchee	Sunray Cave JC Sun Hei	Loan
21 June 2013	Che Runqiu	Wofoo Tai Po	Royal Southern	Free
23 June 2013	Lo Chi Kwan	Kitchee	Royal Southern	Loan
28 June 2013	Tsang Man Fai	Yokohama FC Hong Kong	South China	Undisclosed
28 June 2013	Lo Kong Wai	Yokohama FC Hong Kong	South China	Undisclosed
28 June 2013	Choi Kwok Wai	Sunray Cave JC Sun Hei	Happy Valley	Free
1 July 2013	Cheung Kin Fung	Sunray Cave JC Sun Hei	Kitchee	Undisclosed
2 July 2013	(Australia) Jovo Pavlović	Free agent	South China	Free
2 July 2013	(Australia) Liu Stephen Garlock	Yokohama FC Hong Kong	South China	Undisclosed
4 July 2013	(South Korea) Park Tae-Hong	(Japan) Yokohama F.C.	Yokohama FC Hong Kong	Loan
4 July 2013	(Japan) Taiki Murai	(Japan) Yokohama F.C.	Yokohama FC Hong Kong	Loan
5 July 2013	(Paraguay) Pablo Leguizamón Arce	(Argentina) Colegiales	Happy Valley	Loan
5 July 2013	(Argentina) Jonatan Leonel Acosta	(Argentina) 9 de Julio de Morteros	Happy Valley	Loan
5 July 2013	(Argentina) Diego Daniel Cañete	(Argentina) Club Atlético Belgrano	Happy Valley	Loan
8 July 2013	Wisdom Fofo Agbo	Royal Southern	(China) Harbin Yiteng	Free
9 July 2013	(Argentina) Mauro Andrés Beltramella	(Argentina) Unión de Mar del Plata	Happy Valley	Loan
9 July 2013	(China) Liang Zicheng	Kitchee	Yokohama FC Hong Kong	Undisclosed
9 July 2013	(Spain) Juan Belencoso	(Spain) Cádiz	Kitchee	Undisclosed
11 July 2013	(Bosnia and Herzegovina) Admir Raščić	Free agent	Sun Pegasus	Free
11 July 2013	(Serbia) Aleksandar Ranđelović	(Hungary) Békéscsaba	Sun Pegasus	Undisclosed
14 July 2013	Moses Mensah	Citizen	Biu Chun Rangers	Free
15 July 2013	(Serbia) Marko Krasić	(Indonesia) Arema (IPL)	Citizen	Undisclosed
15 July 2013	Chan Chun Lok	Free agent	Yokohama FC Hong Kong	Free
15 July 2013	Leung Nok Hang	Free agent	Yokohama FC Hong Kong	Free
17 July 2013	(China) Hu Jun	(China) Qingdao Jonoon	Tuen Mun	Loan
17 July 2013	(China) Feng Tao	(China) Jiaozhou Anji Tower	Tuen Mun	Undisclosed
18 July 2013	(England) Toby Philip Down	Kitchee	Citizen	Free
18 July 2013	(Hong Kong) Tsang Chiu Tat	Royal Southern	Tuen Mun	Free
20 July 2013	(Brazil) Rian Marques	(Finland) ORPa	Biu Chun Rangers	Undisclosed
22 July 2013	(Brazil) Stefan	(Brazil) Ypiranga-BA	Citizen	Undisclosed
31 July 2013	(Montenegro) Darko Božović	(Serbia) FK Bežanija	Happy Valley	Loan
31 July 2013	(Argentina) Leonardo Abálsamo	(Argentina) Sportivo Peñarol	Happy Valley	Loan
31 July 2013	(Croatia) Saša Mus	(Bosnia and Herzegovina) Zvijezda	Happy Valley	Loan
6 August 2013	Tsang Man Fai	South China	Royal Southern	Loan
6 August 2013	(Serbia) Mirko Teodorović	Yokohama FC Hong Kong	Sunray Cave JC Sun Hei	Free
6 August 2013	Filipe de Souza Conceicao	South China	Sunray Cave JC Sun Hei	Loan
7 August 2013	Li Ngai Hoi	Kitchee	Royal Southern	Loan
8 August 2013	Cheung Wai Hong	Happy Valley	Sunray Cave JC Sun Hei	Undisclosed
9 August 2013	Stewart Alexander Parin	Kwai Tsing	Sunray Cave JC Sun Hei	Free
10 August 2013	(Brazil) Michel Lugo	(Brazil) GE Bagé	Sunray Cave JC Sun Hei	Free
10 August 2013	(Brazil) Reinaldo de Morais Peres	(Brazil) AO Itabaiana	Sunray Cave JC Sun Hei	Free
17 August 2013	(Brazil) Tomas Maronesi	(Brazil) GE Glória	Biu Chun Rangers	Free
22 August 2013	(Croatia) Petar Garvic	Free agent	Tuen Mun	Free
22 August 2013	(Spain) Dani Sánchez	(Australia) Wellington Phoenix	Tuen Mun	Free
22 August 2013	(Cameroon) Guy Madjo	(England) Macclesfield Town	Tuen Mun	Free
22 August 2013	(China) Zheng Meng	(China) Qingdao Kunpeng	Tuen Mun	Free
26 August 2013	(South Korea) Ko Kyung-Joon	Free agent	South China	Free
27 August 2013	(Japan) Shintaro Harada	(United States) Dayton Dutch Lions	Yokohama FC Hong Kong	Undisclosed
3 September 2013	(Croatia) Ivan Razumović	(Indonesia) Persiraja Banda Aceh	Biu Chun Rangers	Free
16 September 2013	Kwok Wing Sun	Eastern Salon	Sunray Cave JC Sun Hei	Loan
16 September 2013	Wong Chun Hin	Eastern Salon	Sunray Cave JC Sun Hei	Loan
18 September 2013	(Brazil) Rian Marques	Biu Chun Rangers	I-Sky Yuen Long	Undisclosed
20 September 2013	(Brazil) Tales Schutz	Free agent	Biu Chun Rangers	Free
20 September 2013	(South Korea) Lee Kil-Hoon	(China) Guizhou Zhicheng	Biu Chun Rangers	Free
26 September 2013	(Brazil) Fernando	(Brazil) Jacuipense	Citizen	Undisclosed
30 September 2013	Lee Chi Ho	(China) Beijing Guoan	South China	Loan
1 October 2013	(China) Yuan Yang	Sun Pegasus	Tuen Mun	Loan
13 November 2013	(China) Yin Guangjun	(China) Qingdao Jonoon	Tuen Mun	Loan

^{a} Player will officially join his club on 1 June 2013.
