= 2013–14 Sun Hei SC season =

Sunray Cave JC Sun Hei
2013–14 season
- Chairman: Chow Man Leung
- Head Coach: Chiu Chung Man
- Home Ground: Tsing Yi Sports Ground
- First Division: 8th (alphabetically)
- Senior Shield: TBD
- FA Cup: TBD
Home colours	Away colours

The 2013–14 season is Sunray Cave JC Sun Hei's 20th season in the Hong Kong First Division League. Sunray Cave JC Sun Hei will compete in the First Division League, Senior Challenge Shield and FA Cup in this season.

== Key events ==
- 24 May 2013: Spanish midfielder José María Díaz Muñoz joins Thailand Regional League North-East Division club Roi Et United for free.
- 1 June 2013: Chinese-born Hong Kong midfielder Jing Teng joins the club from newly relegated Wofoo Tai Po for free.
- 1 June 2013: Hong Kong defender Pak Wing Chak leaves the club and joins newly promoted First Division club Eastern Salon for an undisclosed fee.
- 1 June 2013: Hong Kong striker Leung Tsz Chun leaves the club and joins newly promoted First Division club Eastern Salon for an undisclosed fee.
- 1 June 2013: Chinese-born Hongkonger goalkeeper Zhang Chunhui leaves the club and rejoins fellow First Division club South China for an undisclosed fee.
- 2 June 2013: Hong Kong defender Chow Siu Chung signs a professional contract with the club.
- 3 June 2013: Hong Kong defender Chueng Chi Yung leaves the club and joins newly promoted First Division club I-Sky Yuen Long for free.
- 5 June 2013: Hong Kong defender Li Hang Wui leaves the club and joins fellow First Division club Yokohama FC Hong Kong for an undisclosed fee.
- 5 June 2013: Hong Kong midfielder Yeung Chi Lun leaves the club and joins newly promoted First Division club Happy Valley for free.
- 7 June 2013: Hong Kong goalkeeper Cheung King Wah leaves the club and joins fellow First Division club Yokohama FC Hong Kong for an undisclosed fee.
- 12 June 2013: Guinean striker Mamadou Barry leaves the club and joins fellow First Division club South China for free.
- 17 June 2013: Hong Kong defender Lui Man Tik joins the club from fellow First Division club Kitchee on a season-long loan.
- 17 June 2013:English-born Hong Kong striker James Ha joins the club from fellow First Division club Kitchee on a season-long loan.
- 17 June 2013:Brazilian-born Hong Kong defender Leung Robson Augusto Ka Hai joins the club from fellow First Division club Kitchee on a season-long loan.
- 20 June 2013: Hong Kong goalkeeper Wong Tsz Him joins the club from fellow First Division club Biu Chun Rangers for an undisclosed fee.
- 20 June 2013: Hong Kong goalkeeper Wong Tsz Chung signs a professional contract with the club.
- 20 June 2013: Hong Kong forward Chan Ho Fung joins the club from fellow First Division club Kitchee on a season-long loan.
- 28 June 2013: Hong Kong midfielder Choi Kwok Wai leaves the club and joins newly promoted First Division club Happy Valley for an undisclosed fee.
- 6 August 2013: Serbian midfielder Mirko Teodorović joins the club from fellow First Division club Yokohama FC Hong Kong on a free transfer.
- 6 August 2013: Brazil-born Hong Kong striker Filipe de Souza Conceicao joins the club on loan from fellow First Division club South China until the end of the season.
- 9 August 2013: Hong Kong defender Stewart Alexander Parin joins the club from Second Division club Kwai Tsing on a free transfer.

== Players ==
=== Squad information ===
N	P	Nat.	Name	Date of birth	Age	Since	Previous club	Notes
1	GK	(Hong Kong)	Wong Tsz Him^{LP}	5 June 1990	23	2013	(Hong Kong) Biu Chun Rangers	
5	DF	(Hong Kong)	Stewart Alexander Parin^{LP}	3 October 1993	20	2013	(Hong Kong) Kwai Tsing	
6	DF	(Cameroon)	Jean-Jacques Kilama^{FP}	13 October 1985	28	2011	(Hong Kong) Fourway Rangers	
7	MF	(Serbia)	Mirko Teodorović^{FP}	6 August 1978	34	2013	Yokohama FC Hong Kong	
8	FW	(Hong Kong)	James Stephen Gee Ha^{LP}	26 December 1992	21	2013	(Hong Kong) Kitchee	Second nationality: England; On loan from Kitchee
10	FW	(Cameroon)	Yrel Cedrique Arnaud Bouet^{FP}	25 May 1989	25	2013 (Winter)	Free Agent	Second nationality: Ivory Coast
11	MF	(Hong Kong)	Cheung Kwok Ming^{LP}	23 December 1990	23	2012	(Hong Kong) Citizen	
14	FW	(Hong Kong)	Filipe de Souza Conceicao^{LP}	11 November 1995	18	2013	(Hong Kong) South China	Second nationality: Brazil; On loan from South China
15	DF	(Hong Kong)	Wong Chun Ho^{LP}	31 May 1990	24	2010	(Hong Kong) Happy Valley	
19	MF	(China)	Su Yang^{LP}	1 December 1985	28	2012	(Hong Kong) Kitchee	Second nationality: Hong Kong
20	GK	(Hong Kong)	Wong Tsz Chung^{LP}	16 June 1995	19	2013	Youth system	
21	DF	(Hong Kong)	Yuen Tsun Nam^{NR}	24 May 1991	23	2012	(Hong Kong) TSW Pegasus	
26	MF	(Hong Kong)	Jing Teng^{LP}	20 May 1990	24	2013	(Hong Kong) Wofoo Tai Po	Second nationality: China
28	DF	(Brazil)	Roberto Orlando Affonso Júnior^{FP}	28 May 1983	31	2007	(Brazil) Botafogo (SP)	Team captain
38	MF	(Hong Kong)	Kot Cho Wai^{LP}	16 December 1991	22	2012	(Hong Kong) South China	
	DF	(Hong Kong)	Lui Man Tik^{LP}	1 June 1994	19	2013	(Hong Kong) Kitchee	On loan from Kitchee
	DF	(Hong Kong)	Leung Robson Augusto Ka Hai^{LP}	22 April 1993	21	2013	(Hong Kong) Kitchee	Second nationality: Brazil; On loan from Kitchee
	FW	(Hong Kong)	Chan Ho Fung^{LP}	27 July 1992	21	2013	(Hong Kong) Kitchee	On loan from Kitchee
	DF	(Hong Kong)	Chow Siu Chung^{LP}	19 January 1996	18	2013	Youth system	

Last update: 9 August 2013
Source: Sunray Cave JC Sun Hei
Ordered by squad number.
^{LP}Local player; ^{FP}Foreign player; ^{NR}Non-registered player

=== Transfers ===
==== In ====
#	Position	Player	Transferred from	Fee	Date	Team	Source
	MF	(Hong Kong) Jing Teng	(Hong Kong) Wofoo Tai Po	Free transfer	1 June 2013	First team	
	DF	(Hong Kong) Chow Siu Chung	Youth system	N/A	2 June 2013	First team	
	GK	(Hong Kong) Wong Tsz Him	(Hong Kong) Biu Chun Rangers	Undisclosed	20 June 2013	First team	
	GK	(Hong Kong) Wong Tsz Chung	Youth system	N/A	20 June 2013	First team	
	MF	(Serbia) Mirko Teodorović	Yokohama FC Hong Kong	Free	6 August 2013	First team	

==== Out ====
#	Position	Player	Transferred to	Fee	Date	Team	Source
25	MF	(Spain) José María Díaz Muñoz	(Thailand) Roi Et United	Free transfer	24 May 2013	First team	
4	DF	(Hong Kong) Pak Wing Chak	(Hong Kong) Eastern Salon	Free transfer (Released)	1 June 2013	First team	
26	FW	(Hong Kong) Leung Tsz Chun	(Hong Kong) Eastern Salon	Free transfer (Released)	1 June 2013	First team	
12	GK	(Hong Kong) Zhang Chunhui	(Hong Kong) South China	Undisclosed	1 June 2013	First team	
23	DF	(Hong Kong) Cheung Chi Yung	(Hong Kong) I-Sky Yuen Long	Free transfer (Released)	3 June 2013	First team	
4	DF	(Hong Kong) Li Hang Wui	Yokohama FC Hong Kong	Undisclosed	5 June 2013	First team	
27	MF	(Hong Kong) Yeung Chi Lun	(Hong Kong) Happy Valley	Free transfer (Released)	5 June 2013	First team	
18	GK	(Hong Kong) Cheung King Wah	Yokohama FC Hong Kong	Undisclosed	7 June 2013	First team	
9	FW	(Guinea) Mamadou Barry	(Hong Kong) South China	Free transfer (Released)	12 June 2013	First team	
17	GK	(Hong Kong) Ho Kwok Chuen	Free Agent	Free transfer (Released)	20 June 2013	First team	
20	DF	(Hong Kong) Cheung Kin Fung	Free Agent	Free transfer (Released)	20 June 2013	First team	
14	MF	(Hong Kong) Choi Kwok Wai	(Hong Kong) Happy Valley	Free transfer (Released)	28 June 2013	First team	
13	DF	(Hong Kong) Cheung Kin Fung	(Hong Kong) Kitchee	Undisclosed	1 July 2013	First team	

==== Loan In ====
#	Position	Player	Loaned from	Date	Loan expires	Team	Source
	DF	(Hong Kong) Lui Man Tik	(Hong Kong) Kitchee	17 June 2013	End of the season	First team	
	FW	(Hong Kong) James Ha	(Hong Kong) Kitchee	17 June 2013	End of the season	First team	
	DF	(Hong Kong) Leung Robson Augusto Ka Hai	(Hong Kong) Kitchee	17 June 2013	End of the season	First team	
	FW	(Hong Kong) Chan Ho Fung	(Hong Kong) Kitchee	20 June 2013	End of the season	First team	
	FW	(Hong Kong) Filipe de Souza Conceicao	(Hong Kong) South China	6 August 2013	End of the season	First team	

==== Loan out ====
#	Position	Player	Loaned to	Date	Loan expires	Team	Source

== Squad statistics ==
=== Overall Stats ===
	First Division	Senior Shield	FA Cup	Total Stats
Games played	0	0	0	0
Games won	0	0	0	0
Games drawn	0	0	0	0
Games lost	0	0	0	0
Goals for	0	0	0	0
Goals against	0	0	0	0
Players used	0	0	0	0^{1}
Yellow cards	0	0	0	0
Red cards	0	0	0	0

Last updated: 23 May 2013
Source: Player Stats

Players Used: Sunray Cave JC Sun Hei have used a total of 0 different players in all competitions.

=== Top scorers ===
Place	Position	Nationality	Number	Name	First Division	Senior Shield	FA Cup	Total
TOTALS					0	0	0	0

=== Disciplinary record ===
Number	Nationality	Position	Name	First Division		Senior Shield		FA Cup		Total	
Number	Nationality	Position	Name	Booked	Sent off (straight red)	Booked	Sent off (straight red)	Booked	Sent off (straight red)	Booked	Sent off (straight red)
TOTALS				0	0	0	0	0	0	0	0

=== Starting 11 ===
This will show the most used players in each position, based on Sunray Cave JC Sun Hei's typical starting formation once the season commences.

=== Captains ===
No.	P	Name	Country	No. games	Notes

Last updated: (Once the season commences)
Source: Competitive match reports.
Competitive matches only
Matches started as captain only
Country: FIFA nationality; No.: Squad number; P: Position; Name: Player name; No. Games: Number of games started as captain.

== Competitions ==
=== Overall ===
Competition	Started round	Current position / round	Final position / round	First match	Last match
Hong Kong First Division League	—	8th		September 2013	
Senior Challenge Shield	Quarter-finals	—		October 2013	
FA Cup	Quarter-finals	—		January 2014	

Updated to match played 23 May 2013
Source: Competitions

=== First Division League ===
==== Classification ====
Pos	Team	Pld	W	D	L	GF	GA	GD	Pts	Qualification or relegation
6	Eastern Salon	18	5	6	7	34	37	−3	21	2013–14 Hong Kong season play-off (Note: Eastern Salon qualified for the 2013–14 Hong Kong season play-off as winners of the 2013–14 Hong Kong FA Cup.)
7	I-Sky Yuen Long	18	5	5	8	25	33	−8	20	
8	Sunray Cave JC Sun Hei (R)	18	5	4	9	32	41	−9	19	Relegation to 2014–15 Hong Kong First Division League (Note: Sunray Cave JC Sun Hei & Citizen declined to participate in the 2014–15 Hong Kong Premier League and would self-relegate in the following season.)
9	Citizen (R)	18	4	6	8	25	33	−8	18	Relegation to 2014–15 Hong Kong First Division League
10	Yokohama FC Hong Kong	18	3	4	11	25	39	−14	13	

Updated to match(es) played on 11 May 2014. Source: Hong Kong Football Association
Rules for classification: 1) points; 2) head-to-head points; 3) head-to-head goal difference; 4) head-to-head goals scored; 5) goal difference; 6) number of goals scored.
(R) Relegated

==== Results summary ====
Overall								Home						Away					
Pld	W	D	L	GF	GA	GD	Pts	W	D	L	GF	GA	GD	W	D	L	GF	GA	GD
0	0	0	0	0	0	0	0	0	0	0	0	0	0	0	0	0	0	0	0

Last updated: 23 May 2013.
Source: First Division

==== Results by round ====
Round	1	2	4	5	6	7	3	9	8	10	11	12	13	14	15	16	17	18	19	20	21	22
Ground	A	H	A	A	H	A	A	H	H	H	H	A	H	A	A	H	A	A	H	H	A	H
Result																						
Position																						

Updated to match(es) played on 21 August 2013. Source: Competitive Matches
A = Away; H = Home; W = Win; D = Draw; L = Loss; V = Voided

== Matches ==
Win Draw Loss Void

=== Pre-season friendlies ===
1 August 2013	Sunray Cave JC Sun Hei (Hong Kong)	1 – 2	(Hong Kong) Tuen Mun	Shek Kip Mei, Kowloon
	Goal		Ling Cong; Hu Jun	Stadium: Shek Kip Mei Park

6 August 2013	Eastern Salon (Hong Kong)	2 – 0	(Hong Kong) Sunray Cave JC Sun Hei	Shek Kip Mei, Kowloon
13:00 UTC+8	Itaparica Itaparica; Giovane			Stadium: Shek Kip Mei Park

8 August 2013	Yokohama FC Hong Kong	1 – 0	(Hong Kong) Sunray Cave JC Sun Hei	Wong Tai Sin, Kowloon
	Fukuda			Stadium: Po Kong Village Road Park

=== First Division League ===
31 August 2013 Round 1	Kitchee	Postponed	Sunray Cave JC Sun Hei	Mong Kok, Kowloon
17:30 UTC+8				Stadium: Mong Kok Stadium (Capacity: 6,680)

3 September 2013 Round 1R	Kitchee	6 – 2	Sunray Cave JC Sun Hei	Mong Kok, Kowloon
20:00 UTC+8	Reinaldo 22' (o.g.); Belencoso 30', 45'; Alex (yellow card) 71'; Jordi 82', 88'; Su Yang 90+2' (o.g.)	Report	(yellow card) 9' Yuen Tsun Nam; 44' (yellow card) 45+1' Lugo; 46' Bouet; (yellow card) 72' Reinaldo; (yellow card) 74' Cheung Kwok Ming	Stadium: Mong Kok Stadium (Capacity: 6,680); Attendance: 1,214; Referee: Liu Kwok Man; Assistant referees: Lui Siu Chuen, Lam Nai Kei; Fourth official: Luk Kin Sun

14 September 2013 Round 2	Sunray Cave JC Sun Hei	1 – 1	Citizen	Tsing Yi, New Territories
14:30 UTC+8	Reinaldo 9'; Lugo (yellow card) 28'	Report	(yellow card) 42' Festus; 56' Sham Kwok Keung	Stadium: Tsing Yi Sports Ground (Capacity: 1,500); Attendance: 309; Referee: Ng Chiu Kok; Assistant referees: Cheng Oi Cho, Yau Ho Fai; Fourth official: Yu Kin Fung

21 September 2013 Round 3	Biu Chun Rangers	1 – 1	Sunray Cave JC Sun Hei	Sham Shui Po, Kowloon
14:30 UTC+8	Razumovic (yellow card) 2'; Law Hiu Chung (yellow card) 45+1'; Chuck Yiu Kwok 71'	Report	12' (yellow card) 45+4' Kot Cho Wai; (yellow card) 29' Kilama	Stadium: Sham Shui Po Sports Ground (Capacity: 2,194); Attendance: 250; Referee: Chan Shui Hung

28 September 2013 Round 4	South China	2 – 0	Sunray Cave JC Sun Hei	So Kon Po, Hong Kong Island
17:30 UTC+8	Chak Ting Fung 27'; Lo Kong Wai 59'	Report	(yellow card) 61' Kilama; (yellow card) 66' Reinaldo; (yellow card) 67' Mirko	Stadium: Hong Kong Stadium (Capacity: 40,000); Attendance: 1,397; Referee: Ng Chiu Kok; Assistant referees: Lam Chi Ho, Chan Ming Siu; Fourth official: Yu Kin Fung

5 October 2013 Round 5	Sunray Cave JC Sun Hei	Postponed	Sun Pegasus	Tsing Yi, New Territories
14:30 UTC+8				Stadium: Tsing Yi Sports Ground (Capacity: 1,500)

19 October 2013 Round 6	Royal Southern	2 – 1	Sunray Cave JC Sun Hei	Aberdeen, Hong Kong Island
14:30 UTC+8	Carril 45+1'; Ip Chung Long 79'	Report	27' Kilama; (yellow card) 44' Yuen Chun Nam; (yellow card) 56' Reinaldo; (yellow card) 64' Bouet; (yellow card) 90' Wong Chun Hin	Stadium: Aberdeen Sports Ground (Capacity: 4,000); Attendance: 364; Referee: Liu Kwok Man; Assistant referees: Chan Ming Siu, Sarao Amarjit Singh; Fourth official: Ho Wai Sing

26 October 2013 Round 7	I-Sky Yuen Long	3 – 1	Sunray Cave JC Sun Hei	Yuen Long, New Territories
17:30 UTC+8	Souza 13', 60'; Fábio 86'	Report	(yellow card) 33' James Ha; 70' Kilama	Stadium: Yuen Long Stadium (Capacity: 4,932); Attendance: 849; Referee: Ho Wai Sing; Assistant referees: Lui Siu Chuen, Luk Kin Sun; Fourth official: Yu Chun Sun

10 November 2013 Round 5R	Sunray Cave JC Sun Hei	3 – 2	Sun Pegasus	Tsing Yi, New Territories
14:30 UTC+8	Kilama (yellow card) 24'; Roberto (yellow card) 29' (yellow-red card) 64'; Mirko (yellow card) 31'; Reinaldo (yellow card) 58' (goal) 90'; So Wai Chuen 79' (o.g.); Cheung Kwok Ming 83'	Report	23' (yellow card) 65' Ju Yingzhi; (yellow card) 26' Tong Kin Man; (yellow card) 31' Campion; 46' (yellow card) 70' Landon Ling; (yellow card) 78' Miović	Stadium: Tsing Yi Sports Ground (Capacity: 1,500); Attendance: 502; Referee: Chan Shui Hung; Assistant referees: Lau Fong Hei, Yau Tsz Yeung; Fourth official: Chan Ming Siu

24 November 2013 Round 9	Sunray Cave JC Sun Hei	2 – 3	Eastern Salon	Tsing Yi, New Territories
14:30 UTC+8	Lugo 18', 40'; Su Yang (yellow card) 66'; Yuen Tsun Nam (yellow card) 72'; Kilama (yellow card) 90+4'	Report	4' Clayton; 52' Itaparica; 68' Giovane; (yellow card) 90+4' Li Haiqiang	Stadium: Tsing Yi Sports Ground (Capacity: 1,500); Attendance: 606; Referee: Tong Kui Sum; Assistant referees: Lau Fong Hei, Sarao Amarjit Singh; Fourth official: Fok Pong Shing

1 December 2013 Round 8	Sunray Cave JC Sun Hei	3 – 2	Yokohama FC Hong Kong	Tsing Yi, New Territories
14:30 UTC+8	Lugo 22'; Kilama 36' (yellow card) 89'; Reinaldo 79'; Cheung Kwok Ming (yellow card) 83'	Report	9' Fukuda; (yellow card) 26' Harada; 30' Yoshitake; (yellow card) 44' Park Tae-Hong	Stadium: Tsing Yi Sports Ground (Capacity: 1,500); Attendance: 214; Referee: Luk Kin Sun; Assistant referees: Chan Shui Hung, Yau Tsz Yeung; Fourth official: Sarao Amarjit Singh

5 January 2013 Round 10	Sunray Cave JC Sun Hei	5 – 0 (Voided)	Happy Valley	Tsing Yi, New Territories
17:30 UTC+8	Cheung Kwok Ming 8'; Jing Teng (yellow card) 20'; Roberto 34' (pen.); Mirko (yellow card) 38'; Kilama 42'; Bouet 50'; Lugo 56'	Report	(yellow card) 24' Choi Kwok Wai; (yellow card) 32' Yeung Chi Lun; (yellow card) 52' (yellow-red card) 70' Akosah; (yellow card) 74' Saša Mus	Stadium: Tsing Yi Sports Ground (Capacity: 1,500); Attendance: 268; Referee: Chan Ming Siu; Assistant referees: Chan Shui Hung, Yu Kin Fung; Fourth official: Fok Pong Shing

26 January 2013 Round 11	Sunray Cave JC Sun Hei	Cancelled	Tuen Mun	Tsing Yi, New Territories
17:30 UTC+8				Stadium: Tsing Yi Sports Ground (Capacity: 1,500)

8 February 2014 Round 12	Tuen Mun	Cancelled	Sunray Cave JC Sun Hei	Tuen Mun, New Territories
14:30 UTC+8				Stadium: Tuen Mun Tang Shiu Kin Sports Ground (Capacity: 2,200)

16 February 2014 Round 13	Sunray Cave JC Sun Hei	3 – 3	I-Sky Yuen Long	Tsing Yi, New Territories
17:30 UTC+8	Kilama (yellow card) 5' (goal) 79'; Roberto (yellow card) 21'; Bouet 86'; Reinaldo (yellow card) 90'; Cheung Kwok Ming (yellow card) 90+2'; Chiu Chun Kit 90+4' (o.g.)	Report	30' Fujimoto; (yellow card) 45+3' Chiu Chun Kit; (yellow card) 67' Cheng King Ho; 76' Souza; 81' Fábio	Stadium: Tsing Yi Sports Ground (Capacity: 1,500); Attendance: 210; Referee: Luk Kin Sun; Assistant referees: Lau Fong Hei, Fok Pong Shing; Fourth official: Lui Siu Chuen

22 February 2013 Round 14	Citizen	3 – 4	Sunray Cave JC Sun Hei	Tsing Yi, New Territories
14:30 UTC+8	Festus (yellow card) 21' (yellow-red card) 51'; Boris Si 29'; Krasić 53'; Chan Hin Kwong (yellow card) 60'; Nakamura (yellow card) 78'; Hélio 90+7'	Report	35', 51' (pen.) Lugo; 46', 70' Bouet; (yellow card) 58' Zhang Jun; (yellow card) 86' Wong Chun Ho	Stadium: Tsing Yi Sports Ground (Capacity: 1,500); Attendance: 142; Referee: Ho Wai Sing; Assistant referees: Luk Kin Sun, Tang Hing Fu; Fourth official: Law Ming Leong

9 March 2013 Round 15	Sun Pegasus	1 – 3	Sunray Cave JC Sun Hei	Mong Kok, Kowloon
17:30 UTC+8	So Wai Chuen (yellow card) 32'; Miović (yellow card) 45'; Deng Jinghuang (yellow card) 69'; Raščić 72'	Report	(yellow card) 8' Zhang Jun; 12' Lai Yiu Cheong; (yellow card) 50' Yuen Tsun Nam; 59' Reinaldo; 64' Lugo; (yellow card) 77' Su Yang; 79' Kilama	Stadium: Mong Kok Stadium (Capacity: 6,680); Attendance: 1,012; Referee: Ng Kai Lam; Assistant referees: Cheng Oi Cho, Fok Pong Shing; Fourth official: Yu Chun Sun

15 March 2013 Round 16	Sunray Cave JC Sun Hei	Postponed	South China	Tsing Yi, New Territories
17:30 UTC+8				Stadium: Tsing Yi Sports Ground (Capacity: 1,500)

22 March 2013 Round 17	Eastern Salon	4 – 2	Sunray Cave JC Sun Hei	Sham Shui Po, Kowloon
14:30 UTC+8	Cheng Siu Wai 27'; Li Haiqiang (yellow card) 28'; Giovane 33', 49', 74'; Clayton (yellow card) 85'; Leung Chi Wing (yellow card) 86'; Paulo (yellow card) 89'	Report	(yellow card) 57' Cheung Kwok Ming; 63' Reinaldo; 90+2' (o.g.) Leung Chi Wing; (yellow card) 90+2' Lai Yiu Cheong	Stadium: Sham Shui Po Sports Ground (Note: The match will be played at Sham Shui Po Sports Ground instead of Eastern Salon's home ground Shing Mun Valley Sports Ground.) (Capacity: 2,194); Attendance: 936; Referee: Ho Wai Sing; Assistant referees: Chow Chun Kit, Yu Chun Sun; Fourth official: Lui Siu Chuen

30 March 2013 Round 18	Yokohama FC Hong Kong	1 – 3	Sunray Cave JC Sun Hei	Tseung Kwan O, New Territories
14:30 UTC+8	Park Tae-Hong (yellow card) 41'; Lew Wai Yip (yellow card) 48'; Au Yeung Yiu Chung (yellow card) 62' (goal) 81'	Report	4' Lai Yiu Cheong; 9' Kilama; (yellow card) 57' Roberto; (yellow card) 86' (goal) 90+2' Cheung Kwok Ming; (yellow card) 90' Mirko	Stadium: Tseung Kwan O Sports Ground (Capacity: 3,500); Attendance: 259; Referee: Lau Fong Hei; Assistant referees: Chan Ming Siu, Yu Chun Sun; Fourth official: Ng Chiu Kok

5 April 2013 Round 19	Sunray Cave JC Sun Hei	0 – 2	Kitchee	Tsing Yi, New Territories
17:30 UTC+8	Wong Chun Hin (yellow card) 17'; Kwok Wing Sun (yellow card) 28'; Su Yang (yellow card) 47'	Report	7' Dani; 90+1' Lam Ka Wai	Stadium: Tsing Yi Sports Ground (Capacity: 1,500); Attendance: 594; Referee: Tong Kui Sum; Assistant referees: Cheng Oi Cho, Ng Wai Hong; Fourth official: Law Bik Chi

20 April 2013 Round 20	Sunray Cave JC Sun Hei	1 – 2	Biu Chun Rangers	Tsing Yi, New Territories
17:30 UTC+8	Reinaldo 70'; Lai Yiu Cheong (yellow card) 73'; Roberto (yellow card) 86'	Report	6' Chao Pengfei; (yellow card) 24' Joel; 82' (yellow card) 83' (yellow-red card) 90+1' Schutz; (yellow card) 85' Chow Cheuk Fung; (yellow card) 90+1' Lam Hok Hei	Stadium: Tsing Yi Sports Ground (Capacity: 1,500); Attendance: 283; Referee: Liu Kwok Man; Assistant referees: Lui Siu Chuen, Chan Ming Siu; Fourth official: Tang Hing Fu

3 May 2013 Round 21	Happy Valley	Cancelled	Sunray Cave JC Sun Hei	Tai Po, New Territories
14:30 UTC+8				Stadium: Tai Po Sports Ground (Capacity: 3,000)

6 May 2013 Round 16R	Sunray Cave JC Sun Hei	v	South China	Mong Kok, Kowloon
14:30 UTC+8				Stadium: Mong Kok Stadium (Note: The match will be played at Mong Kok Stadium instead of Sunray Cave JC Sun Hei's home ground Tsing Yi Sports Ground.) (Capacity: 6,680)

10–11 May 2014 Round 22	Sunray Cave JC Sun Hei	v	Royal Southern	Tsing Yi, New Territories
TBC				Stadium: Tsing Yi Sports Ground (Capacity: 1,500)

=== Senior Shield ===
2 November 2013 1st Round	Sunray Cave JC Sun Hei	v	Tuen Mun	Mong Kok, Kowloon
14:30 UTC+8				Stadium: Mong Kok Stadium (Capacity: 6,680)

7 December 2013 Quarter-finals	Royal Southern	v	Sunray Cave JC Sun Hei	Mong Kok, Kowloon
14:30 UTC+8				Stadium: Mong Kok Stadium (Capacity: 6,680)
