= 2013–14 Yokohama FC Hong Kong season =

Yokohama FC Hong Kong
2013–14 season
- Chairman: Hiroshi Onodera
- Head coach: Lee Chi Kin
- Home Ground: Tseung Kwan O Sports Ground (Capacity: 3,500)
- First Division: 10th (alphabetically)
- Senior Shield: 1st Round
- FA Cup: TBD
- Top goalscorer: League: Kenji Fukuda (9 goals); All: Kenji Fukuda (10 goals)
- Highest home attendance: 1,003 (27 October 2013 vs South China, First Division)
- Lowest home attendance: 257 (26 February 2014 vs Sun Pegasus, First Division)
- Average home league attendance: 547 (First Division only)
Home colours	Away colours

The 2013–14 season is Yokohama FC Hong Kong's 2nd season in the Hong Kong First Division League. Yokohama FC Hong Kong will compete in the First Division League, Senior Challenge Shield and FA Cup.

== Key events ==
- 3 June 2013: Montenegrins defender Čedomir Mijanović leaves the club from fellow First Division club I-Sky Yuen Long for free.
- 5 June 2013: Hong Kong defender Li Hang Wui joins the club from fellow First Division club Sunray Cave JC Sun Hei for an undisclosed fee.
- 7 June 2013: Hong Kong midfielder Au Yeung Yiu Chung joins the club from fellow First Division club South China for free after his contract with South China expiries.
- 7 June 2013: Hong Kong defender Li Shu Yeung joins the club from newly relegated Second Division club Wofoo Tai Po for free.
- 7 June 2013: Hong Kong goalkeeper Cheung King Wah joins the club from fellow First Division club Sunray Cave JC Sun Hei for an undisclosed fee.
- 7 June 2013: The club confirms the departure of Serbian midfielder Mirko Teodorović and Hong Kong defender Chan Siu Kwan and goalkeeper Tsang Man Fai.
- 8 June 2013: Hong Kong defender Chu Ka Chun leaves the club and joins newly promoted First Division club Happy Valley for an undisclosed fee.
- 11 June 2013: Hong Kong defender Leung Kwok Wai leaves the club and joins newly promoted First Division club Eastern Salon for free.
- 11 June 2013: Hong Kong midfielder Chan Siu Kwan leaves the club and joins defending champions South China for an undisclosed fee.
- 28 June 2013: Hong Kong goalkeeper Tsang Man Fai leaves the club and joins defending champions South China for an undisclosed fee.
- 28 June 2013: Hong Kong forward Lo Kong Wai leaves the club and joins defending champions South China for an undisclosed fee.
- 2 July 2013: Australian–Hongkonger defender Liu Stephen Garlock leaves the club and joins defending champions South China for an undisclosed fee.
- 4 July 2013: South Korean defender Park Tae-Hong joins the club on loan from J.League Division 2 club Yokohama F.C. until 31 January 2014.
- 4 July 2013: Japanese goalkeeper Taiki Murai has his loan from J.League Division 2 club Yokohama F.C. extended until 31 January 2014.
- 9 July 2013: Chinese–Hongkonger striker Liang Zicheng joins the club from fellow First Division club Kitchee for an undisclosed fee.
- 15 July 2013: Hong Kong midfielder Chan Chun Lok returns from England Brooke House College Football Academy and joins the club.
- 15 July 2013: Hong Kong defender Leung Nok Hang, the younger brother of Leung Kwun Chung, returns from England Brooke House College Football Academy and joins the club.
- 6 August 2013: Serbian midfielder Mirko Teodorović leaves the club and joins fellow First Division club Sunray Cave JC Sun Hei on a free transfer.
- 27 August 2013: Japanese midfielder Shintaro Harada joins the club from USL Pro club Dayton Dutch Lions on an undisclosed fee.
- 10 January 2014: Chinese-born Hong Kong midfielder Liang Zicheng leaves the club and joins fellow First Division club Eastern Salon for HK$15k.
- 27 January 2014: Japanese midfielder Masaaki Ideguchi joins the club on loan from J.League Division 2 club Yokohama F.C. until the end of the season.
- 31 January 2014: Japanese midfielder Shintaro Harada returns to his parent USL Pro club Dayton Dutch Lions after a 5-month loan spell at the club.

== Players ==
=== Squad information ===
N	P	Nat.	Name	Date of birth	Age	Since	Previous club	Notes
2	DF	(Hong Kong)	Lew Wai Yip^{LP}	19 September 1992	21	2012	Youth system	
3	DF	(Hong Kong)	Li Hang Wui^{LP}	15 February 1985	29	2013	(Hong Kong) Sunray Cave JC Sun Hei	
4	DF	(Hong Kong)	Li Shu Yeung^{LP}	2 May 1991	23	2013	(Hong Kong) Wofoo Tai Po	
5	DF	(Hong Kong)	Leung Kwun Chung^{LP}	1 April 1992	22	2012	(Hong Kong) Sham Shui Po	Team vice captain
6	MF	(Japan)	Masaaki Ideguchi^{FP}	10 August 1988	25	2014 (Winter)	(Japan) Yokohama F.C.	On loan from Yokohama F.C.
8	MF	(Hong Kong)	Lee Ka Yiu^{LP}	10 April 1992	22	2012	(Hong Kong) Sham Shui Po	
10	MF	(Hong Kong)	Lau Cheuk Hin^{LP}	26 April 1992	22	2012	(Hong Kong) Sham Shui Po	
12	DF	(Hong Kong)	Leung Nok Hang^{LP}	14 November 1994	19	2013	Free agent	
13	MF	(Hong Kong)	Hui Ka Lok^{LP}	5 January 1994	20	2013	(Hong Kong) Eastern Salon	
14	FW	(Hong Kong)	Fong Pak Lun^{LP}	14 April 1993	21	2012	(Hong Kong) Sham Shui Po	
16	MF	(Hong Kong)	Tan Chun Lok^{LP}	5 January 1996	18	2013	Free agent	
17	GK	(Hong Kong)	To Chun Kiu^{LP}	17 July 1994	19	2012	(Hong Kong) Sham Shui Po	
18	FW	(Japan)	Tsuyoshi Yoshitake^{FP}	8 September 1981	32	2012	(United States) Tampa Bay Rowdies	Team captain
19	MF	(Hong Kong)	Au Yeung Yiu Chung^{LP}	11 July 1989	24	2013	(Hong Kong) South China	
20	FW	(Japan)	Kenji Fukuda^{FP}	21 October 1977	36	2013 (Winter)	(Japan) Ehime F.C.	
21	GK	(Japan)	Taiki Murai^{FP}	12 June 1992	21	2013	(Japan) Yokohama F.C.	On loan from Yokohama FC
22	DF	(Hong Kong)	Leung Kam Fai^{LP}	17 July 1986	27	2013	(Hong Kong) Mutual	
23	FW	(Hong Kong)	Wong Wai^{LP}	17 September 1992	21	2012	(Hong Kong) Sham Shui Po	
25	MF	(Hong Kong)	Lau Hok Ming^{LP}	19 October 1995	18	2012	(Hong Kong) Sham Shui Po	
26	MF	(Hong Kong)	Lee Ka Ho^{LP}	26 April 1993	21	2012	(Hong Kong) Sham Shui Po	
27	DF	(South Korea)	Park Tae-Hong^{FP}	25 March 1991	23	2013	(Japan) Yokohama F.C.	On loan from Yokohama F.C.
28	GK	(Hong Kong)	Cheung King Wah^{LP}	6 July 1986	27	2013	(Hong Kong) Sunray Cave JC Sun Hei	
31	DF	(Hong Kong)	Law Chun Bong^{LP}	25 January 1981	33	2012	(Hong Kong) Citizen	

As of 10 January 2014

Source: Yokohama FC Hong Kong

Ordered by squad number.

^{LP}Local player; ^{FP}Foreign player; ^{NR}Non-registered player

=== Transfers ===
==== In ====
#	Position	Player	Transferred from	Fee	Date	Team	Source
3	DF	(Hong Kong) Li Hang Wui	(Hong Kong) Sunray Cave JC Sun Hei	Undisclosed	5 June 2013	First team	
19	MF	(Hong Kong) Au Yeung Yiu Chung	(Hong Kong) South China	Free transfer	7 June 2013	First team	
4	DF	(Hong Kong) Li Shu Yeung	(Hong Kong) Wofoo Tai Po	Free transfer	7 June 2013	First team	
28	GK	(Hong Kong) Cheung King Wah	(Hong Kong) Sunray Cave JC Sun Hei	Undisclosed	7 June 2013	First team	
7	FW	(China) Liang Zicheng	(Hong Kong) Kitchee	Undisclosed	9 July 2013	First team	
16	MF	(Hong Kong) Chan Chun Lok	Free agent	Free transfer	15 July 2013	First team	
12	DF	(Hong Kong) Leung Nok Hang	Free agent	Free transfer	15 July 2013	First team	
24	MF	(Japan) Shintaro Harada	(United States) Dayton Dutch Lions	Undisclosed	27 August 2013	First team	

==== Out ====
#	Position	Player	Transferred to	Fee	Date	Team	Source
33	DF	(Montenegro) Čedomir Mijanović	(Hong Kong) I-Sky Yuen Long	Free transfer	3 June 2013	First team	
	DF	(Hong Kong) Chu Ka Chun	(Hong Kong) Happy Valley	Undisclosed	8 June 2013	Reserves	
32	DF	(Hong Kong) Leung Kwok Wai	(Hong Kong) Eastern Salon	Free transfer	11 June 2013	First team	
22	MF	(Hong Kong) Chan Siu Kwan	(Hong Kong) South China	Undisclosed	28 June 2013	First team	
1	GK	(Hong Kong) Tsang Man Fai	(Hong Kong) South China	Undisclosed	28 June 2013	First team	
9	FW	(Hong Kong) Lo Kong Wai	(Hong Kong) South China	Undisclosed	28 June 2013	First team	
6	DF	(Australia) (Hong Kong) Liu Stephen Garlock	(Hong Kong) South China	Undisclosed	2 July 2013	First team	
25	MF	(Serbia) Mirko Teodorović	(Hong Kong) Sunray Cave JC Sun Hei	Free	6 August 2013	First team	
4	MF	(Hong Kong) Ryan Ambrad Cuenca	(Hong Kong) Tung Sing	Free	31 August 2013	First team	
7	MF	(China) Liang Zicheng	(Hong Kong) Eastern Salon	$15k	10 January 2014	First team	

==== Loan In ====
Squad #	Position	Player	Loaned from	Date	Loan expires	Team	Source
27	DF	(South Korea) Park Tae-Hong	(Japan) Yokohama F.C.	4 July 2013	End of the season	First team	
21	GK	(Japan) Taiki Murai	(Japan) Yokohama F.C.	4 July 2013	End of the season	First team	
6	MF	(Japan) Masaaki Ideguchi	(Japan) Yokohama F.C.	27 January 2014	End of the season	First team	

==== Loan out ====
#	Position	Player	Loaned to	Date	Loan expires	Team	Source

== Club ==
=== Coaching staff ===
Position	Staff
Head Coach	(Hong Kong) Lee Chi Kin
Assistant Coach	(Hong Kong) Chung Kin Hei
Assistant Coach	(Hong Kong) Lee Mei Fang

Last updated: 16 July 2012
Source: Yokohama FC Hong Kong

== Squad statistics ==
Note: Voided matches are not counted in the statistics except disciplined records.

=== Overall Stats ===
	First Division	Senior Shield	FA Cup	Total Stats
Games played	11	1	0	13
Games won	2	0	0	2
Games drawn	3	0	0	3
Games lost	7	1	0	8
Goals for	18	1	0	19
Goals against	24	4	0	28
Players used	22	13	0	22^{1}
Yellow cards	35	3	0	38
Red cards	2	0	0	2

Last updated: 26 February 2014
Source: Player Stats

Players Used: Yokohama FC Hong Kong has used a total of 22 different players in all competitions.

=== Squad Stats ===
				Total				Hong Kong First Division League		Senior Challenge Shield		FA Cup		
N	Pos.	Name	Nat.	GS	App	Gls	Min	App	Gls	App	Gls	App	Gls	Notes
17	GK	To Chun Kiu	(Hong Kong)											(−) GA
21	GK	Taiki Murai	(Japan)	13	13	-28	1170	12	-24	1	-4			(−) GA
28	GK	Cheung King Wah	(Hong Kong)											(−) GA
2	DF	Lew Wai Yip	(Hong Kong)		2		2	1		1				
3	DF	Li Hang Wui	(Hong Kong)	2	2		162	2						
4	DF	Li Shu Yeung	(Hong Kong)	10	11		994	11						
5	DF	Leung Kwun Chung	(Hong Kong)	9	12		791	11		1				
12	DF	Leung Nok Hang	(Hong Kong)	12	13	1	1122	12	1	1				
14	DF	Fong Pak Lun	(Hong Kong)	10	11		916	10		1				
22	DF	Leung Kam Fai	(Hong Kong)		3		17	3						
26	DF	Lee Ka Ho	(Hong Kong)	3	5		236	4		1				
27	DF	Park Tae-Hong	(South Korea)	11	11		942	11						
31	DF	Law Chun Bong	(Hong Kong)											
6	MF	Masaaki Ideguchi	(Japan)	4	4		360	4						
8	MF	Lee Ka Yiu	(Hong Kong)	4	12		402	11		1				
10	MF	Lau Cheuk Hin	(Hong Kong)	4	8		401	7		1				
13	MF	Hui Ka Lok	(Hong Kong)		1		13	1						
16	MF	Tan Chun Lok	(Hong Kong)	9	9		810	9						
19	MF	Au Yeung Yiu Chung	(Hong Kong)	5	7		456	7						
25	MF	Lau Hok Ming	(Hong Kong)		1			1						
	MF	Liang Zicheng	(China)	7	8	1	569	7	1	1				
	MF	Shintaro Harada	(Japan)	6	6	1	540	5	1	1				
18	FW	Tsuyoshi Yoshitake	(Japan)	11	11	3	990	10	3	1				
20	FW	Kenji Fukuda	(Japan)	13	13	10	1170	12	9	1	1			
23	FW	Wong Wai	(Hong Kong)	9	10	1	801	9	1	1				

Last updated: 26 February 2014
Ordered by Position
0 shown as blank

=== Top scorers ===
Place	Position	Nationality	Number	Name	First Division	Senior Shield	FA Cup	Total
1	FW	(Japan)	20	Kenji Fukuda	9	1	0	10
2	FW	(Japan)	18	Tsuyoshi Yoshitake	3	0	0	3
3	DF	(Hong Kong)	12	Leung Nok Hang	1	0	0	1
3	FW	(Hong Kong)	23	Wong Wai	1	0	0	1
3	MF	(Hong Kong)		Liang Zicheng	1	0	0	1
3	MF	(Japan)		Shintaro Harada	1	0	0	1
3	Own goal				2	0	0	2
TOTALS					18	1	0	19

As of 26 February 2014

=== Disciplinary record ===
Includes all competitive matches. Players listed below made at least one appearance for Yokohama FC Hong Kong first squad during the season.

N	P	Nat.	Name	League			Shield			FA Cup			Total			Notes
N	P	Nat.	Name	Yellow card	Second yellow card	Red card	Yellow card	Second yellow card	Red card	Yellow card	Second yellow card	Red card	Yellow card	Second yellow card	Red card	Notes
2	DF	(Hong Kong)	Lew Wai Yip													
3	DF	(Hong Kong)	Li Hang Wui													
4	DF	(Hong Kong)	Li Shu Yeung	2		1							2		1	
5	DF	(Hong Kong)	Leung Kwun Chung	5			1						6			
6	MF	(Japan)	Masaaki Ideguchi	1									1			
8	MF	(Hong Kong)	Lee Ka Yiu													
10	MF	(Hong Kong)	Lau Cheuk Hin	1									1			
12	DF	(Hong Kong)	Leung Nok Hang	2									2			
13	MF	(Hong Kong)	Hui Ka Lok													
14	DF	(Hong Kong)	Fong Pak Lun	4			1						5			
16	MF	(Hong Kong)	Tan Chun Lok	3									3			
18	FW	(Japan)	Tsuyoshi Yoshitake	5									5			
19	MF	(Hong Kong)	Au Yeung Yiu Chung													
20	FW	(Japan)	Kenji Fukuda													
21	GK	(Japan)	Taiki Murai	1									1			
23	FW	(Hong Kong)	Wong Wai	1									1			
25	MF	(Hong Kong)	Lau Hok Ming													
26	DF	(Hong Kong)	Lee Ka Ho	1			1						2			
27	DF	(South Korea)	Park Tae-Hong	3	1								3	1		
	MF	(Hong Kong) (China)	Liang Zicheng	2									2			
	MF	(Japan)	Shintaro Harada	4									4			

Last updated: 26 February 2014
Source: Competitive matches
Ordered by (red card) , (second yellow card) and (yellow card)
(yellow card) = Number of bookings; (second yellow card) = Number of sending offs after a second yellow card; (red card) = Number of sending offs by a direct red card.

=== Substitution record ===
Includes all competitive matches.

			League		Shield		FA Cup		Total	
No.	Pos	Name	subson	subsoff	subson	subsoff	subson	subsoff	subson	subsoff
Goalkeepers
17	GK	To Chun Kiu	0	0	0	0	0	0	0	0
21	GK	Taiki Murai	0	0	0	0	0	0	0	0
28	GK	Cheung King Wah	0	0	0	0	0	0	0	0
Defenders
2	DF	Lew Wai Yip	1	0	1	0	0	0	2	0
3	DF	Li Hang Wui	0	1	0	0	0	0	0	1
4	DF	Li Shu Yeung	1	5	0	0	0	0	1	5
5	DF	Leung Kwun Chung	3	3	0	0	0	0	3	3
12	DF	Leung Nok Hang	1	1	0	0	0	0	1	1
14	MF	Fong Pak Lun	1	1	0	1	0	0	1	2
22	DF	Leung Kam Fai	3	0	0	0	0	0	3	0
26	DF	Lee Ka Ho	2	1	0	0	0	0	2	1
27	DF	Park Tae-Hong	0	1	0	0	0	0	0	1
31	DF	Law Chun Bong	0	0	0	0	0	0	0	0
Midfielders
6	MF	Masaaki Ideguchi	0	0	0	0	0	0	0	0
8	MF	Lee Ka Yiu	8	3	0	1	0	0	8	4
10	MF	Lau Cheuk Hin	4	2	0	0	0	0	4	2
13	MF	Hui Ka Lok	1	0	0	0	0	0	1	0
16	MF	Tan Chun Lok	0	1	0	0	0	0	0	1
19	MF	Au Yeung Yiu Chung	2	3	0	0	0	0	2	3
24	MF	Shintaro Harada	0	0	0	0	0	0	0	0
25	MF	Lau Hok Ming	1	0	0	0	0	0	1	0
	MF	Liang Zicheng	0	6	1	0	0	0	1	6
Forwards
18	FW	Tsuyoshi Yoshitake	0	0	0	0	0	0	0	0
20	FW	Kenji Fukuda	0	0	0	0	0	0	0	0
23	FW	Wong Wai	2	2	0	0	0	0	2	2

Last updated: 26 February 2014

=== Captains ===
No.	P	Name	Country	No. games	Notes
18	FW	Tsuyoshi Yoshitake	(Japan)	11	Captain
5	DF	Leung Kwun Chung	(Hong Kong)	1	1st Vice-captain
19	MF	Au Yeung Yiu Chung	(Hong Kong)	1	2nd Vice-captain

Last updated: 26 February 2014
Source: Competitive match reports.
Competitive matches only
Matches started as captain only
Country: FIFA nationality; No.: Squad number; P: Position; Name: Player name; No. Games: Number of games started as captain.

== Competitions ==
=== Overall ===
Competition	Started round	Current position / round	Final position / round	First match	Last match
Hong Kong First Division League	—	12th		1 September 2013	
Senior Challenge Shield	Quarter-finals	—		October 2013	
FA Cup	Quarter-finals	—		January 2014	

Updated to match played 13 August 2013
Source: Competitions

=== First Division League ===
==== Classification ====
Pos	Team	Pld	W	D	L	GF	GA	GD	Pts	Qualification or relegation
8	Sunray Cave JC Sun Hei (R)	18	5	4	9	32	41	−9	19	Relegation to 2014–15 Hong Kong First Division League (Note: Sunray Cave JC Sun Hei & Citizen declined to participate in the 2014–15 Hong Kong Premier League and would self-relegate in the following season.)
9	Citizen (R)	18	4	6	8	25	33	−8	18	Relegation to 2014–15 Hong Kong First Division League
10	Yokohama FC Hong Kong	18	3	4	11	25	39	−14	13	
11	Happy Valley (D, R)	0	0	0	0	0	0	0	0	Excluded, record expunged Relegation to 2014–15 Hong Kong First Division League (Note: On 13 February 2014, the HKFA announced that as a result of a match-fixing investigation, both Tuen Mun and Happy Valley would be excluded from the league, and their records would be expunged.)
12	Tuen Mun (D, R)	0	0	0	0	0	0	0	0	Excluded, record expunged Relegation to 2014–15 Hong Kong First Division League

Updated to match(es) played on 11 May 2014. Source: Hong Kong Football Association
Rules for classification: 1) points; 2) head-to-head points; 3) head-to-head goal difference; 4) head-to-head goals scored; 5) goal difference; 6) number of goals scored.
(D) Disqualified; (R) Relegated

==== Results summary ====
Overall								Home						Away					
Pld	W	D	L	GF	GA	GD	Pts	W	D	L	GF	GA	GD	W	D	L	GF	GA	GD
12	2	3	7	18	24	−6	9	2	1	2	8	7	+1	0	2	5	10	17	−7

Last updated: 26 February 2014.
Source: First Division

==== Results by round ====
Round	1	2	4	6	7	8	9	10	5	11	12	13	14	3	15	16	17	18	19	20	21	22
Ground	A	A	H	H	H	A	A	A	A	H	A	A	H	H								
Result	D	L	D	L	L	L	D	V	C	W	L	L	W	L								
Position (Note: Kitchee's position at the end of the day in which their match was played)	5	8	7	8	9	10	10	10	10	9	10	10	10	10								

Updated to match(es) played on 26 February 2014. Source: Competitive Matches
A = Away; H = Home; W = Win; D = Draw; L = Loss; C = Cancelled; V = Voided

== Matches ==
Win Draw Loss Void

=== Pre-season friendlies ===
8 August 2013	Yokohama FC Hong Kong	1 – 0	(Hong Kong) Sunray Cave JC Sun Hei	Wong Tai Sin, Kowloon
	Fukuda			Stadium: Po Kong Village Road Park

August 2013	Guangdong Sunray Cave (China)	v	Yokohama FC Hong Kong	Guangzhou, China PR
TBA				Stadium: Sanshui Football Training Base

August 2013	Yokohama FC Hong Kong	v	(Hong Kong) Royal Southern	Guangzhou, China PR
TBA				Stadium: Sanshui Football Training Base

August 2013	Yokohama FC Hong Kong	v	(Hong Kong) Tuen Mun	Guangzhou, China PR
TBA				Stadium: Sanshui Football Training Base

August 2013	Yokohama FC Hong Kong	v	(Hong Kong) Citizen	Guangzhou, China PR
TBA				Stadium: Sanshui Football Training Base

=== First Division League ===
1 September 2013 Round 1	Citizen	1 – 1	Yokohama FC Hong Kong	Tsing Yi, New Territories
14:30 UTC+8	Stefan 53'; Krasić (yellow card) 53'; Sham Kwok Fai (yellow card) 66'	Report	(yellow card) 50' Chan Chun Lok; (yellow card) 58' (yellow-red card) 74' Park Tae-Hong; 81' Fukuda	Stadium: Tsing Yi Sports Ground (Capacity: 1,500); Attendance: 472; Referee: Ng Kai LamHa[pp; Assistant referees: Chow Chun Kit, Luk Kin Sun; Fourth official: Liu Kwok Man

15 September 2013 Round 2	Biu Chun Rangers	3 – 2	Yokohama FC Hong Kong	Sham Shui Po, Kowloon
14:30 UTC+8	Lam Hok Hei 13' (pen.); Moses 42' (yellow card) 90+3'; Daniel (yellow card) 57'; Tomas (yellow card) 67'; Chan Ming Kong (yellow card) 85'; Miroslav 90' (pen.)	Report	(yellow card) 12' Murai; 34', 90+1' Fukuda; (yellow card) 40' Chan Chun Lok; (yellow card) 53' Yoshitake; (yellow card) 56' Leung Kwun Chung	Stadium: Sham Shui Po Sports Ground (Capacity: 2,194); Attendance: 457; Referee: Liu Kwok Man; Assistant referees: Tong Kui Sum, Sarao Amarjit Singh; Fourth official: Yau Tsz Yeung

22 September 2013 Round 3	Yokohama FC Hong Kong	P – P (Note: The match originally kicks off on 22 September 2013. Due to typhoon, the match was cancelled and postponed. It has been scheduled to play at 20:00 on 26 February 2014.)	Sun Pegasus	Tseung Kwan O, New Territories
17:30 UTC+8				Stadium: Tseung Kwan O Sports Ground (Capacity: 3,500)

28 September 2013 Round 4	Yokohama FC Hong Kong	1 – 1	Eastern Salon	Tseung Kwan O, New Territories
14:30 UTC+8	Fong Pak Lun (yellow card) 4'; Leung Kwun Chung (yellow card) 10'; Fukuda 48'; Leung Lok Hang (yellow card) 66'; Park Tae-Hong (yellow card) 68'; Yoshitake (yellow card) 79'	Report	(yellow card) 13' Lau Nim Yat; 32' Giovane; (yellow card) 52' Clayton; (yellow card) 55' Beto; (yellow card) 79' Yiu Hok Man; (yellow card) 90+2' Diego	Stadium: Tseung Kwan O Sports Ground (Capacity: 3,500); Attendance: 431; Referee: Ng Kai Lam; Assistant referees: Chan Shui Hung, Sarao Amarjit Singh; Fourth official: Lam Nai Kei

5 October 2013 Round 5	Happy Valley	P – P	Yokohama FC Hong Kong	Tai Po, New Territories
14:30 UTC+8				Stadium: Tai Po Sports Ground (Capacity: 3,000)

19 October 2013 Round 6	Yokohama FC Hong Kong	0 – 1	Kitchee	Tseung Kwan O, New Territories
17:30 UTC+8		Report	(yellow card) 9' Recio; (yellow card) 52' Chan Man Fai; 65' Annan; (yellow card) 84' Alex	Stadium: Tseung Kwan O Sports Ground (Capacity: 3,500); Attendance: 605; Referee: Luk Kin Sun; Assistant referees: Chow Chun Kit, Lam Nai Kei; Fourth official: Lau Fong Hei

27 October 2013 Round 7	Yokohama FC Hong Kong	1 – 2	South China	Tseung Kwan O, New Territories
14:30 UTC+8	Harada (yellow card) 22'; Leung Kwun Chung (yellow card) 57'; Liang Zicheng (yellow card) 78'; Fong Pak Lun (yellow card) 80'; Chak Ting Fung 84' (o.g.); Li Shu Yeung (red card) 90+4'	Report	(yellow card) 37' (yellow-red card) 59' Michael Luk; 60' Kwok Kin Pong; (yellow card) 90+1' Zhang Chunhui; 90+5' (pen.) Barry	Stadium: Tseung Kwan O Sports Ground (Capacity: 3,500); Attendance: 1,003; Referee: Ng Kai Lam; Assistant referees: Cheng Oi Cho, Lau Fong Hei; Fourth official: Tang Hing Fu

1 December 2013 Round 8	Sunray Cave JC Sun Hei	3 – 2	Yokohama FC Hong Kong	Tsing Yi, New Territories
14:30 UTC+8	Lugo 22'; Kilama 36' (yellow card) 89'; Reinaldo 79'; Cheung Kwok Ming (yellow card) 83'	Report	9' Fukuda; (yellow card) 26' Harada; 30' Yoshitake; (yellow card) 44' Park Tae-Hong	Stadium: Tsing Yi Sports Ground (Capacity: 1,500); Attendance: 214; Referee: Luk Kin Sun; Assistant referees: Chan Shui Hung, Yau Tsz Yeung; Fourth official: Sarao Amarjit Singh

14 December 2013 Round 9	Royal Southern	2 – 2	Yokohama FC Hong Kong	Aberdeen, Hong Kong Island
14:30 UTC+8	Carril 31' (yellow card) 33'; Lo Chi Kwan (yellow card) 50'; Chan Cheuk Kwong (yellow card) 77'; Chow Ka Wa 81'	Report	(yellow card) 21' (goal) 29' Liang Zicheng; (yellow card) 50' Li Shu Yeung; (yellow card) 56' Fong Pak Lun; 87' Yoshitake	Stadium: Aberdeen Sports Ground (Capacity: 4,000); Attendance: 283; Referee: Lau Fong Hei; Assistant referees: Chai Shui Hung, Lam Nai Kei; Fourth official: Ng Wai Hong

22 December 2013 Round 10	Tuen Mun	1 – 2 (Voided)	Yokohama FC Hong Kong	Tuen Mun, New Territories
14:30 UTC+8	Xie Silida (yellow card) 17'; Lai Yiu Cheong (yellow card) 18'; Yip Tsz Chun (yellow card) 32' (goal) 73'; Petar (yellow card) 48'; Tsang Chiu Tat (yellow card) 49'	Report	(yellow card) 29' Li Shu Yeung; 66' Fukuda; 90+3' Li Ming; (yellow card) 74' Harada	Stadium: Tuen Mun Tang Shiu Kin Sports Ground (Capacity: 2,200); Attendance: 525; Referee: Chan Ming Siu; Assistant referees: Cheng Oi Cho, Yu Chun Sun; Fourth official: Yau Tsz Yeung

11 January 2014 Round 5R	Happy Valley	Cancelled	Yokohama FC Hong Kong	Tai Po, New Territories
14:30 UTC+8				Stadium: Tai Po Sports Ground (Capacity: 3,000)

24 January 2014 Round 11	Yokohama FC Hong Kong	2 – 1	I-Sky Yuen Long	Tseung Kwan O, New Territories
20:00 UTC+8	Harada 8' (yellow card) 70'; Fong Pak Lun (yellow card) 29'; Fukuda 77'	Report	(yellow card) 55' Chan Ka Chun; (yellow card) 65' Fábio; 68' Souza; (yellow card) 71' Gustavo	Stadium: Tseung Kwan O Sports Ground (Capacity: 3,500); Attendance: 301; Referee: Ng Kai Lam; Assistant referees: Cheng Oi Cho, Yau Tsz Yeung; Fourth official: Lam Nai Kei

9 February 2014 Round 12	I-Sky Yuen Long	3 – 1	Yokohama FC Hong Kong	Yuen Long, New Territories
17:30 UTC+8	Yuen Lap Cheung (yellow card) 33'; Souza (yellow card) 41' (goal) 90+4'; Marques (yellow card) 58'; Chiu Chun Kit (yellow card) 59'; Sandro 81' (pen.); Gustavo (yellow card) 86'; Cheung Tsz Kin (yellow card) 87'	Report	31' Leung Nok Hang; (yellow card) 43' Tan Chun Lok; (yellow card) 58' Yoshitake; (yellow card) 80' Park Tae-Hong	Stadium: Yuen Long Stadium (Capacity: 4,932); Attendance: 463; Referee: Ho Wai Sing; Assistant referees: Chan Ming Siu, Yu Kin Fung; Fourth official: Mok Kar Main

15 February 2014 Round 13	South China	3 – 1	Yokohama FC Hong Kong	So Kon Po, Hong Kong Island
17:30 UTC+8	Kajkut (yellow card) 55' (goal) 64'; Sealy 89'; Barisic 90+2'	Report	45+1' Fukuda; (yellow card) 59' Wong Wai; (yellow card) 63' Leung Kwun Chung	Stadium: Hong Kong Stadium (Capacity: 40,000); Attendance: 961; Referee: Cheng Oi Cho; Assistant referees: Chow Chun Kit, Yau Ho Fai; Fourth official: Chan Ming Siu

23 February 2014 Round 14	Yokohama FC Hong Kong	4 – 1	Biu Chun Rangers	Tseung Kwan O, New Territories
17:30 UTC+8	Fukuda 9', 85'; Leung Nok Hang (yellow card) 12'; Yoshitake (yellow card) 30' (goal) 47'; Lau Cheuk Hin (yellow card) 65'; Wong Wai 87'	Report	(yellow card) 29' Law Hiu Chung; (yellow card) 30' (yellow-red card) 43' Liu Songwei; 32' Lam Hok Hei; (yellow card) 90+1' Chuck Yiu Kwok	Stadium: Tseung Kwan O Sports Ground (Capacity: 3,500); Attendance: 685; Referee: Ng Chiu Kok; Assistant referees: Lau Fong Hei, Fok Pong Shing; Fourth official: Luk Kin Sun

26 February 2014 Round 3R	Yokohama FC Hong Kong	1 – 3	Sun Pegasus	Tseung Kwan O, New Territories
20:00 UTC+8	Ideguchi (yellow card) 32'; Cesar 61' (o.g.)	Report	(yellow card) 11' (goal) 85' Ju Yingzhi; 51' Miović; 58' Raščić	Stadium: Tseung Kwan O Sports Ground (Capacity: 3,500); Attendance: 257; Referee: Luk Kin Sun; Assistant referees: Lui Siu Chuen, Yau Ho Fai; Fourth official: Lo Ming Leong

8 March 2014 Round 15	Yokohama FC Hong Kong	Cancelled	Happy Valley	Tseung Kwan O, New Territories
17:30 UTC+8				Stadium: Tseung Kwan O Sports Ground (Capacity: 3,500)

16 March 2014 Round 16	Eastern Salon	2 – 0	Yokohama FC Hong Kong	Mong Kok, Kowloon
14:30 UTC+8	Liang Zicheng (yellow card) 37' (goal) 85'; Giovane 47'; Tse Man Wing (yellow card) 58'; Beto (yellow card) 88'	Report	(yellow card) 10' Wong Wai; (yellow card) 25' Leung Kwun Chung; (yellow card) 70' Leung Nok Hang	Stadium: Mong Kok Stadium (Note: The match will be played at Mong Kok Stadium instead of Eastern Salon's home ground Shing Mun Valley Sports Ground.) (Capacity: 6,680); Attendance: 1,055; Referee: Luk Kin Sun; Assistant referees: Chan Shui Hung, Yu Kin Fung; Fourth official: Lau Fong Hei

23 March 2014 Round 17	Yokohama FC Hong Kong	2 – 2	Royal Southern	Tseung Kwan O, New Territories
14:30 UTC+8	Lau Cheuk Hin (yellow card) 30'; Leung Kwun Chung 54'; Fukuda 70'	Report	3' Yago; (yellow card) 50' Che Runqiu; 56' Rubén; (yellow card) 57' (yellow-red card) 85' Tan Chun Lok; (yellow card) 90+3' Diaz	Stadium: Tseung Kwan O Sports Ground (Capacity: 3,500); Attendance: 388; Referee: Ng Chiu Kok; Assistant referees: Luk Kin Sun, Lee Chung Yin; Fourth official: Wong Ping Chung

30 March 2014 Round 18	Yokohama FC Hong Kong	1 – 3	Sunray Cave JC Sun Hei	Tseung Kwan O, New Territories
14:30 UTC+8	Park Tae-Hong (yellow card) 41'; Lew Wai Yip (yellow card) 48'; Au Yeung Yiu Chung (yellow card) 62' (goal) 81'	Report	4' Lai Yiu Cheong; 9' Kilama; (yellow card) 57' Roberto; (yellow card) 86' (goal) 90+2' Cheung Kwok Ming; (yellow card) 90' Mirko	Stadium: Tseung Kwan O Sports Ground (Capacity: 3,500); Attendance: 259; Referee: Lau Fong Hei; Assistant referees: Chan Ming Siu, Yu Chun Sun; Fourth official: Ng Chiu Kok

6 April 2014 Round 19	Yokohama FC Hong Kong	3 – 2	Citizen	Tseung Kwan O, New Territories
14:30 UTC+8	Tan Chun Lok (yellow card) 18'; Wong Wai (yellow card) 24'; Fukuda 40'; Leung Nok Hang 46'; Yoshitake (yellow card) 57'; Park Tae-Hong (yellow card) 68'; Tse Tak Him 78' (o.g.)	Report	(yellow card) 18' Festus; 57' Stefan; (yellow card) 61' Tam Lok Hin; 85' Makamura	Stadium: Tseung Kwan O Sports Ground (Capacity: 3,500); Attendance: 457; Referee: Lau Fong Hei; Assistant referees: Chow Chun Kit, Chan Shing Kin; Fourth official: Ng Chiu Kok

19 April 2014 Round 20	Sun Pegasus	2 – 0	Yokohama FC Hong Kong	Mong Kok, Kowloon
17:30 UTC+8	Ranđelović 20'; Raščić 34'; Yip Tsz Chun (yellow card) 66'; Miović (yellow card) 68'	Summary	Wong Wai (yellow card) 62'; Fukuda (yellow card) 68'; Ideguchi (yellow card) 84'	Stadium: Mong Kok Stadium (Capacity: 6,680); Attendance: 1,159; Referee: (Hong Kong) Fong Hei Lau

4 May 2014 Round 21	Yokohama FC Hong Kong	Cancelled	Tuen Mun	Tseung Kwan O, New Territories
14:30 UTC+8				Stadium: Tseung Kwan O Sports Ground (Capacity: 3,500)

10 May 2014 Round 22	Kitchee	4 – 1	Yokohama FC Hong Kong	Mong Kok, Kowloon
15:30	Diego Cascón 26'; Annan 45', 66'; Leung Ka Hai 78'; Wan Chun (yellow card) 82'	Summary	Leung Kwun Chung (yellow card) 7'; Yoshitake 43'; Lee Ka Yiu (yellow card) 90'	Stadium: Mong Kok Stadium (Capacity: 6,680); Attendance: 630; Referee: (Hong Kong) Siu Chuen Liu

=== Senior Shield ===
3 November 2013 1st Round	Yokohama FC Hong Kong	1 – 4	Sun Pegasus	Mong Kok, Kowloon
17:30 UTC+8	Lee Ka Ho (yellow card) 11'; Leung Kwun Chung (yellow card) 17'; Fukuda 47'; Fong Pak Lun (yellow card) 59'	Report	25', 45' Raščić; (yellow card) 28' Lo Chun Kit; 61', 88' McKee	Stadium: Mong Kok Stadium (Capacity: 6,680); Attendance: 991; Referee: Ng Chiu Kok; Assistant referees: Chan Ming Siu, Tang Hing Fu; Fourth official: Ho Wai Sing
