= Wong Tsz Chung =

Hong Kong footballer

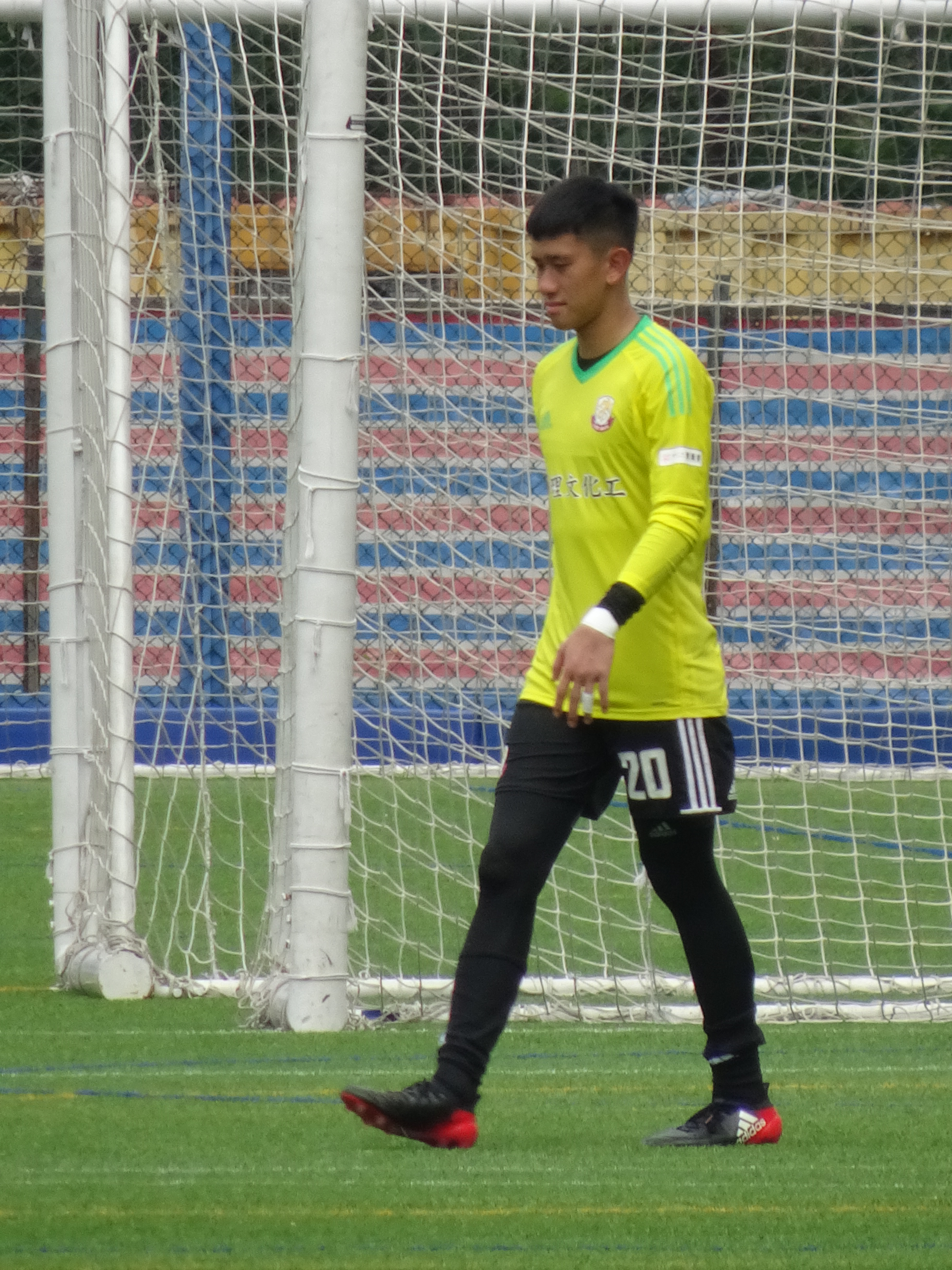

Personal information
- Full name: Wong Tsz Chung
- Date of birth: 16 June 1995 (age 31)
- Place of birth: Hong Kong
- Height: 1.85 m (6 ft 1 in)
- Position: Goalkeeper

Team information
- Current team: HKFC
- Number: 95

Youth career
- 2010–2013: Sun Hei

Senior career*
Years	Team	Apps	(Gls)
2013–2015	Sun Hei	22	(0)
2015–2016	Pegasus	0	(0)
2016–2017	Yuen Long	0	(0)
2017–2018	Lee Man	0	(0)
2018–2021	Kitchee	0	(0)
2020–2021	→ Sham Shui Po (loan)	13	(0)
2021–2023	Sham Shui Po	15	(0)
2023–2025	Citizen	40	(0)
2025–	HKFC	10	(0)

International career^{‡}
2017–2018	Hong Kong U-23	2	(0)
- * Club domestic league appearances and goals as of 6 September 2026 ‡ National team caps and goals as of 11 July 2021

Wong Tsz Chung (Chinese: 王子聰; born 16 June 1995) is a Hong Kong professional footballer who currently plays as a goalkeeper for Hong Kong Premier League club HKFC.

== Club career ==
Wong started his senior career with Sun Hei in 2013.

In 2015, Wong signed for Pegasus. He made his professional debut at the club in the Hong Kong FA Cup match against Wanchai on 3 February 2016.

After that, Wong played for Yuen Long and Lee Man.

In 2018, Wong joined Kitchee.

In November 2020, Wong was loaned to Sham Shui Po.

In March 2021, Wong officially joined Sham Shui Po.

In July 2023, Wong joined Citizen.

On 1 August 2025, Wong returned to the top flight and joined Hong Kong Premier League club HKFC.
