= Masaaki Ideguchi =

Japanese footballer

Masaaki Ideguchi 井手口 正昭
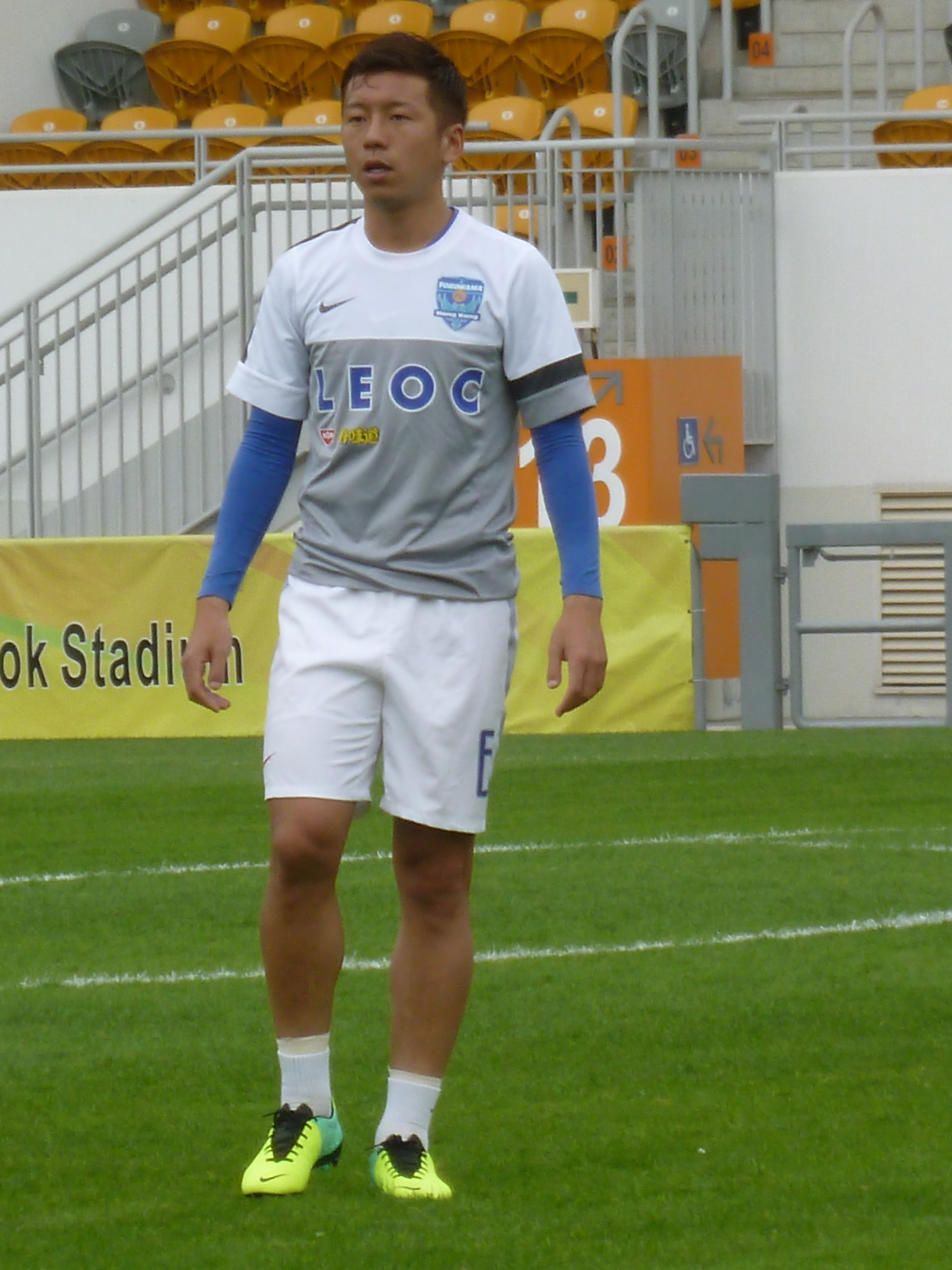

Personal information
- Full name: Masaaki Ideguchi
- Date of birth: 10 August 1988 (age 38)
- Place of birth: Fukuoka, Japan
- Height: 1.73 m (5 ft 8 in)
- Position: Midfielder

Youth career
- 2004–2006: Higashi Fukuoka High School

College career
| Years | Team | Apps | (Gls) |
| 2007–2010 | Hannan University | | |

Senior career*
| Years | Team | Apps | (Gls) |
| 2011–2015 | Yokohama FC | 22 | (0) |
| 2014–2015 | → Metro Gallery FC (loan) | 11 | (0) |
| 2015–2017 | Hoàng Anh Gia Lai | 33 | (3) |
| 2017 | Sukhothai | | |
| 2018 | FC Osaka | | |
| 2019 | Visakha | | |
| 2020 | Phnom Penh Crown | 14 | (1) |
| 2021– | Chanthabouly | 2 | (0) |
- * Club domestic league appearances and goals as of 31 December 2019

Masaaki Ideguchi (井手口 正昭, Ideguchi Masaaki; born 10 April 1988) is a Japanese footballer who plays for Chanthabouly in Lao League 1.

== Career ==
=== Hoàng Anh Gia Lai ===
Ideguchi joined Vietnamese V.League 1 side Hoàng Anh Gia Lai in December 2015.

== Personal life ==
His younger brother is Yosuke Ideguchi, a midfielder who plays for Cultural Leonesa.

== Club statistics ==
Updated to 27 February 2018.

| Club performance | | | League | | Cup | | Total | |
| Season | Club | League | Apps | Goals | Apps | Goals | Apps | Goals |
| Japan | | | League | | Emperor's Cup | | Total | |
|---|---|---|---|---|---|---|---|---|
| 2011 | Yokohama FC | J2 League | 7 | 0 | 0 | 0 | 7 | 0 |
| 2012 | Yokohama FC | J2 League | 13 | 0 | 2 | 0 | 15 | 0 |
| 2013 | Yokohama FC | J2 League | 2 | 0 | 1 | 0 | 3 | 0 |
| 2015 | Yokohama FC | J2 League | 0 | 0 | 1 | 0 | 1 | 0 |
| 2018 | FC Osaka | JFL | 0 | 0 | 0 | 0 | 0 | 0 |
| Total | | | 22 | 0 | 4 | 0 | 29 | 0 |
