= Jing Teng =

Hong Kong footballer

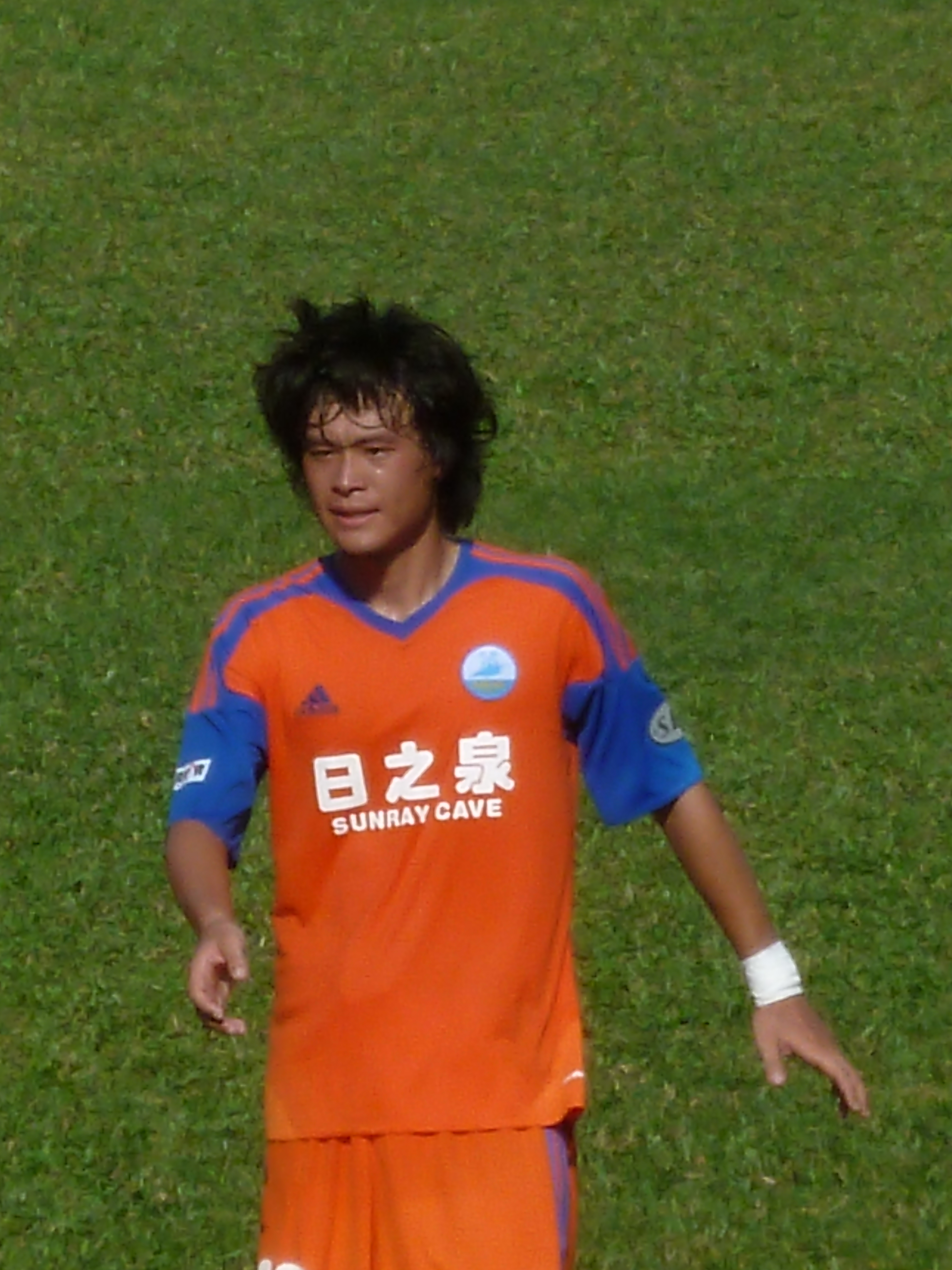

Personal information
- Full name: Jing Teng
- Date of birth: May 20, 1990 (age 36)
- Place of birth: Ma'anshan, Anhui, China
- Height: 1.80 m (5 ft 11 in)
- Positions: Midfielder; defender

Youth career
- Shanghai Shenhua

Senior career*
| Years | Team | Apps | (Gls) |
| 2006–2009 | Panyu Pearl | | |
| 2009–2013 | Tai Po | 47 | (1) |
| 2013–2014 | Sunray Cave JC Sun Hei | 0 | (0) |
| 2014–2015 | Tai Po | 4 | (0) |
| 2015–2016 | Yau Tsim Mong | 18 | (7) |
| 2016–2017 | R&F | 9 | (0) |
| 2017–2020 | Wong Tai Sin | 19 | (1) |

International career^{‡}
| 2011–2012 | Hong Kong U21 | | |
| 2013 | Hong Kong U23 | | |
- * Club domestic league appearances and goals as of 9 December 2018 ‡ National team caps and goals as of 10 July 2013

Jing Teng (Chinese: 荊騰; born 20 May 1990 in Ma'anshan) is a Chinese-born former Hong Kong footballer who played as a midfielder.

== Club career ==
=== Early career ===
Jing Teng was one of the member of Shanghai Shenhua youth team. In 2006, when he was playing for Shanghai Shenhua youth team against Red Star Belgrade youth team, he was scouted by the opposite side scout and nearly joined the club, but failed to obtain a visa, which made the deal fell through.

=== Tai Po ===
Che joined Hong Kong First Division club Tai Po in 2009. He started developed as a regular first team member in the 2012–13 season as he featured a total of 27 matches in the season, although Tai Po were relegated at the end of the season.

=== Sun Hei ===
Che joined fellow First Division club Sunray Cave JC Sun Hei on 1 June 2013.

== International career ==
Born in China, Jing Teng joined Hong Kong club Tai Po in 2009. After playing for Tai Po two years, he successfully gain a citizenship in Hong Kong. He was selected into the Hong Kong U21 in 2011. On 15 June 2013, he was chosen as one of the member of the Hong Kong U23 training squad for the 2013 East Asian Games.

On 3 May 2013, he was called up by the Hong Kong national football team for the first time. The training squad was to prepare for the International friendly against the Philippines on 4 June 2013 in Hong Kong.

== Career statistics ==
=== Club ===
As of 5 May 2013.

| Club | Season | Division | League | | Shield & FA Cup | | League Cup | | AFC Cup | | Others^{1} | | Total | |
| Club | Season | Division | Apps | Goals | Apps | Goals | Apps | Goals | Apps | Goals | Apps | Goals | Apps | Goals |
|---|---|---|---|---|---|---|---|---|---|---|---|---|---|---|
| NT Reality Wofoo Tai Po | 2009–10 | First Division | 13 | 0 | 2 | 0 | — | — | 0 | 0 | N/A | N/A | 15 | 0 |
| NT Reality Wofoo Tai Po | 2010–11 | First Division | 9 | 1 | 2 | 0 | 1 | 0 | — | — | N/A | N/A | 12 | 1 |
| Wofoo Tai Po | 2011–12 | First Division | 10 | 0 | 1 | 0 | 1 | 0 | — | — | N/A | N/A | 11 | 0 |
| Wofoo Tai Po | 2012–13 | First Division | 15 | 0 | 11 | 0 | — | — | — | — | 1 | 0 | 27 | 0 |
| Tai Po Total | | | 47 | 1 | 16 | 0 | 2 | 0 | 0 | 0 | 0 | 0 | 65 | 1 |
| Sunray Cave JC Sun Hei | 2013–14 | First Division | 0 | 0 | 0 | 0 | — | — | — | — | N/A | N/A | 0 | 0 |
| Sun Hei Total | | | 0 | 0 | 0 | 0 | 0 | 0 | 0 | 0 | 0 | 0 | 0 | 0 |
| Career Total | | | 47 | 1 | 16 | 0 | 2 | 0 | 0 | 0 | 0 | 0 | 65 | 1 |

^{1} Others include Hong Kong season play-offs.

== Honours ==
=== Club ===
Tai Po

- Hong Kong Senior Shield (1): 2012-13
