= Taiki Murai =

Japanese footballer

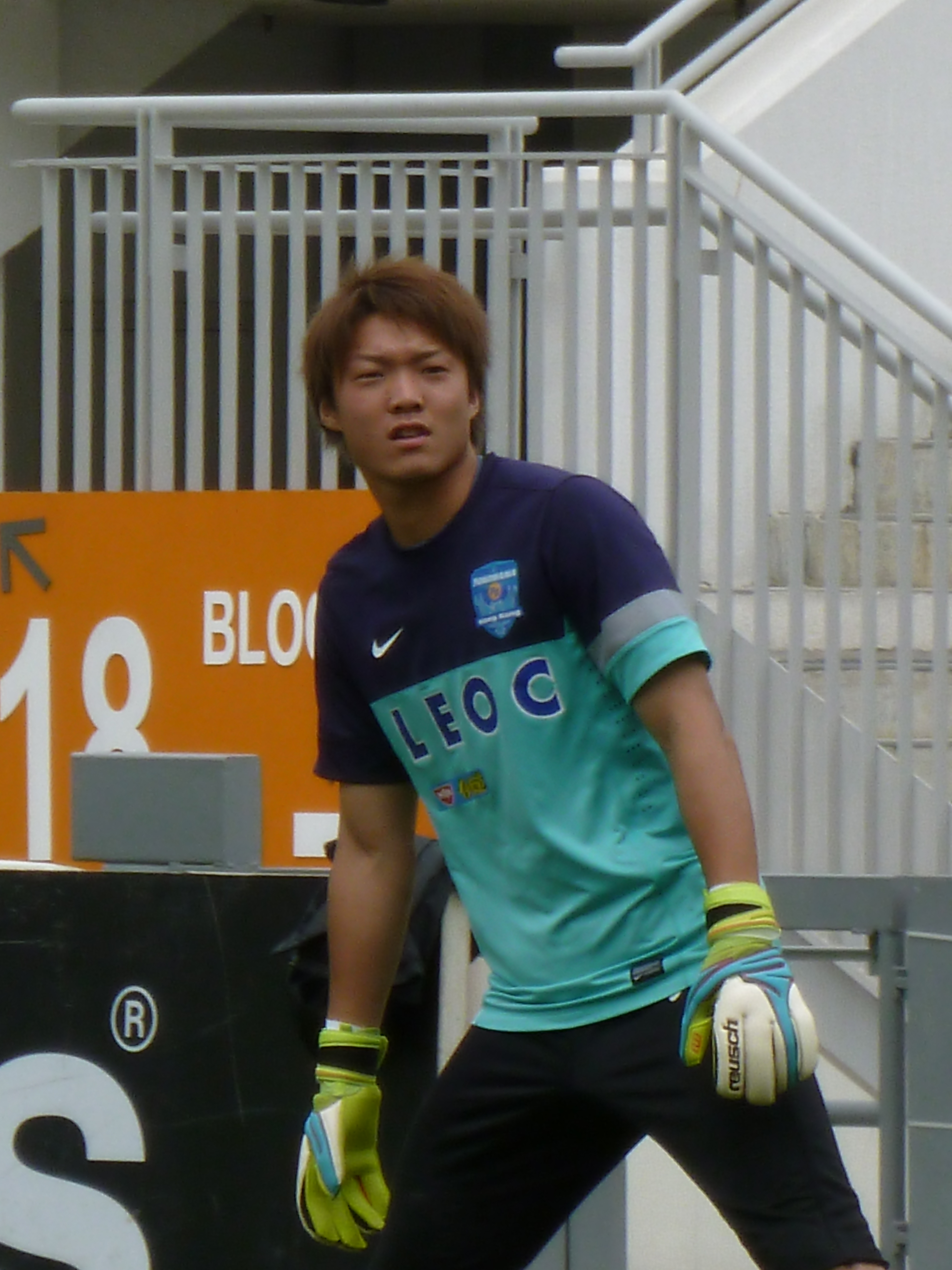

Personal information
- Full name: Taiki Murai
- Date of birth: 12 June 1992 (age 34)
- Place of birth: Mie, Japan
- Height: 1.79 m (5 ft 10 in)
- Position: Goalkeeper

Senior career*
| Years | Team | Apps | (Gls) |
| 2011–2015 | Yokohama FC | 0 | (0) |
| 2013–2014 | →Yokohama FC Hong Kong (loan) | 13 | (0) |
| 2014 | →Ehime FC (loan) | 0 | (0) |
| Total | | 13 | (0) |
- * Club domestic league appearances and goals as of 31 December 2015

Taiki Murai (村井 泰希, Murai Taiki; born 12 June 1992) is a Japanese former football player who is currently the assistant goalkeeper coach of the J2 League club Yokohama FC.

== Club career ==
=== Yokohama FC ===
Murai joined Yokohama-based Yokohama FC in 2011 from graduated from high school.

=== Yokohama FC Hong Kong ===
On 20 December 2012, Murai joined Hong Kong First Division League club Yokohama FC Hong Kong on loan from J2 League club Yokohama FC until the end of the season. He made his debut for his new club against Kitchee on 20 January 2013. His fine performance led the team gain a draw from the defending champions of the league.

On 4 July 2013, Yokohama FC confirms the extension of loan to Yokohama FC Hong Kong until 31 January 2014.

== Club statistics ==
| Club | Season | Division | League | | Cup & Shield^{1} | | FA Cup | | Continental | | Total | |
| Club | Season | Division | Apps | Goals | Apps | Goals | Apps | Goals | Apps | Goals | Apps | Goals |
|---|---|---|---|---|---|---|---|---|---|---|---|---|
| Yokohama FC | 2011 | J2 League | 0 | 0 | 0 | 0 | 0 | 0 | 0 | 0 | 0 | 0 |
| Yokohama FC | 2012 | J2 League | 0 | 0 | 0 | 0 | 0 | 0 | 0 | 0 | 0 | 0 |
| Yokohama FC Total | | | 0 | 0 | 0 | 0 | 0 | 0 | 0 | 0 | 0 | 0 |
| Japan Total | | | 0 | 0 | 0 | 0 | 0 | 0 | 0 | 0 | 0 | 0 |
| Yokohama FC HK (loan) | 2012–13 | First Division | 5 | 0 | 1 | 0 | 0 | 0 | 0 | 0 | 6 | 0 |
| Yokohama FC HK (loan) | 2013–14 | First Division | 8 | 0 | 0 | 0 | 0 | 0 | 0 | 0 | 8 | 0 |
| Yokohama FC Hong Kong Total | | | 13 | 0 | 1 | 0 | 0 | 0 | 0 | 0 | 14 | 0 |
| Hong Kong Total | | | 13 | 0 | 1 | 0 | 0 | 0 | 0 | 0 | 14 | 0 |
| Career Total | | | 13 | 0 | 1 | 0 | 0 | 0 | 0 | 0 | 14 | 0 |

^{1}Cup & Shield includes Hong Kong League Cup, Hong Kong Senior Challenge Shield and J.League Cup.
