= Lui Man Tik =

Hong Kong footballer

Lui Man-tik
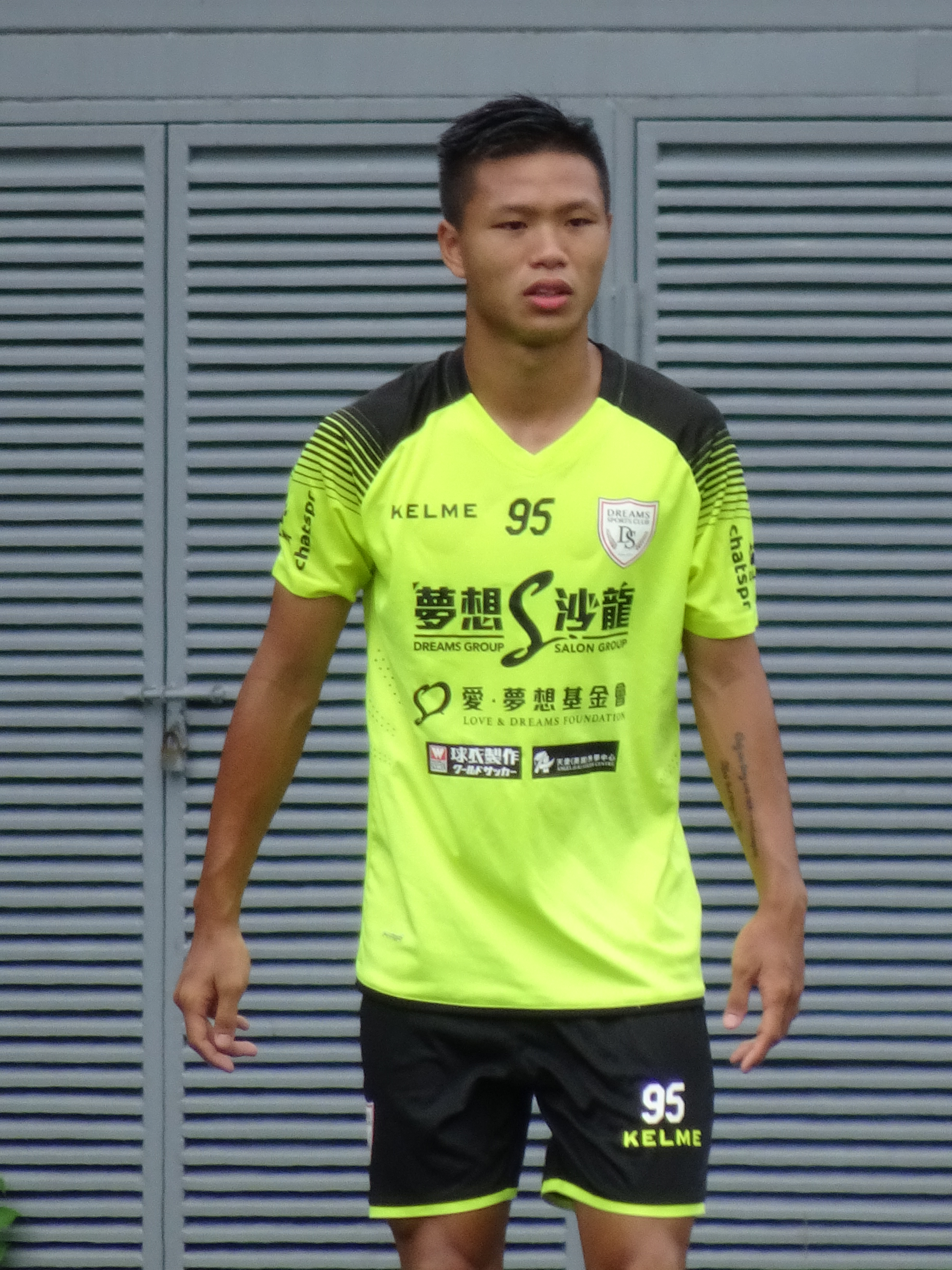

Personal information
- Full name: Mandy Lui Man-tik
- Date of birth: 1 June 1994 (age 32)
- Place of birth: Hong Kong
- Height: 1.80 m (5 ft 11 in)
- Position: Left back

Youth career
- 2006–2013: Kitchee

Senior career*
Years	Team	Apps	(Gls)
2011–2012	→ Tai Chung (loan)	15	(0)
2013–2014	Kitchee	0	(0)
2013	→ Sun Hei (loan)	0	(0)
2013–2014	→ Tai Chung (loan)	13	(1)
2014–2016	North District	24	(5)
2016–2017	Wing Go	13	(4)
2017–2019	Dreams FC	29	(1)
2019–2020	Pegasus	4	(0)
2020–2021	Metro Gallery	10	(0)
2021–2023	Happy Valley	38	(4)
2023–2024	Eastern District	15	(0)
2024–2026	3 Sing	33	(1)
2026–	Spiny Rayed	0	(0)
- * Club domestic league appearances and goals

Mandy Lui Man-tik (Chinese: 雷文迪; born 1 June 1994 in Hong Kong) is a Hong Kong former Hong Kong professional footballer.

== Club career ==
As an aspiring footballer, Lui attended Yan Chai Hospital Tung Chi Ying Memorial Secondary School due to their strong football teams. He trained as a member of Kitchee's academy and was signed in 2013 but never featured for the first team. Lui went on loan to Sun Hei during his year at Kitchee.

Following his release from Kitchee in 2014, he played for North District.

In the summer of 2017, Lui was recruited by Dreams FC head coach Leung Chi Wing to play for his side. He scored his first goal for the club on 5 November in a 2–1 loss to R&F.

On 16 July 2019, Lui signed for Pegasus.
