= Stewart Alexander Parin =

British/Thai Hong Kong footballer

Alexander Stewart
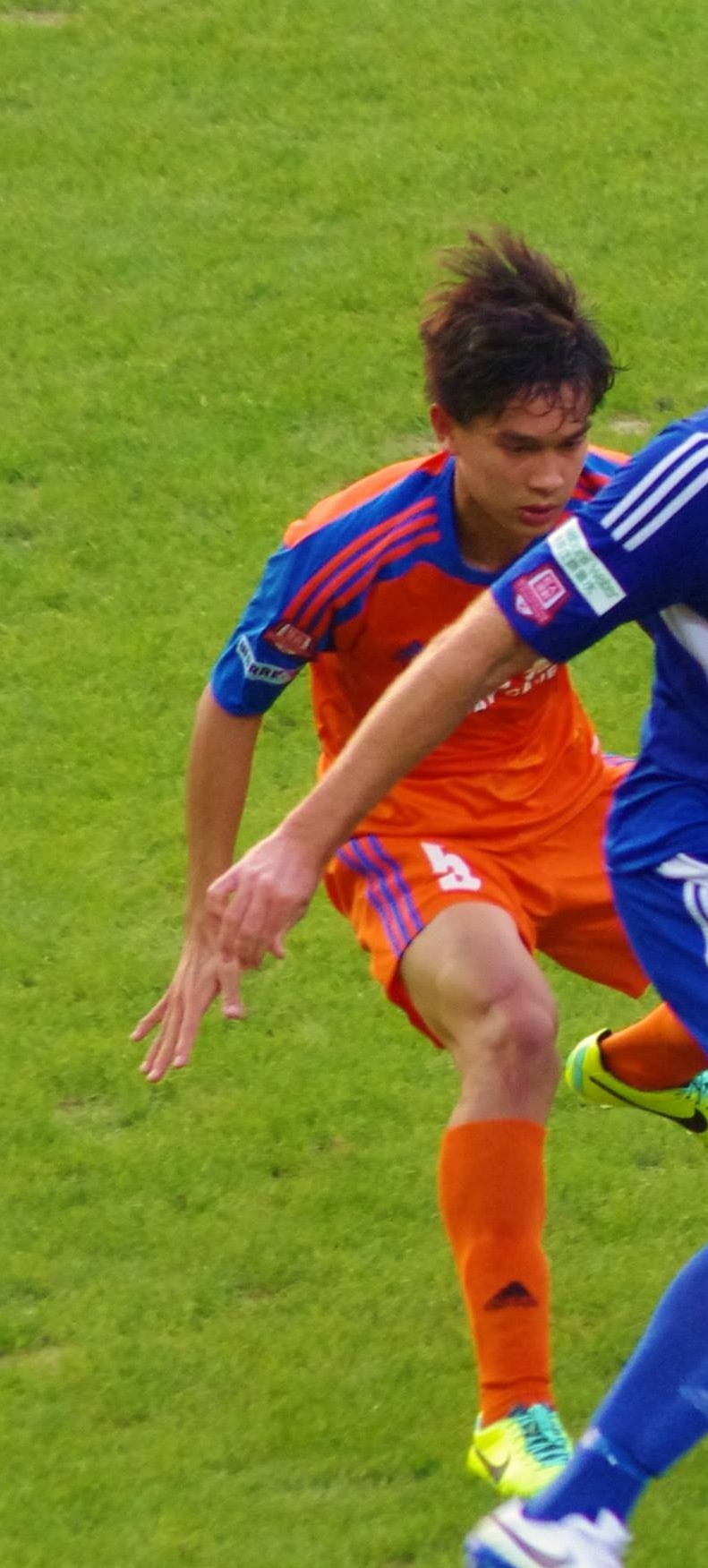
- Game against Eastern Salon FA Cup

Personal information
- Full name: Alexander Parin Stewart
- Date of birth: 3 October 1993 (age 33)
- Place of birth: British Hong Kong
- Height: 1.89 m (6 ft 2 in)
- Position: Centre back

Youth career
- 2008–2013: Kwai Tsing

Senior career*
Years	Team	Apps	(Gls)
2013–2014	Sun Hei	5	(0)
2014–2015	Wong Tai Sin	4	(0)
2015–2016	Sparta Asia		
2016–2017	Biu Chun Glory Sky	3	(0)
2017–2024	Wing Yee	64	(2)
2024–	Tung Sing	45	(3)

International career
	Hong Kong U-23	2	(0)
- * Club domestic league appearances and goals

Stewart Alexander Parin (Chinese: 釗域亞歷山大; pinyin: Zhāo Yù Yàlìshāndà; born 3 October 1993) is a former Hong Kong professional footballer who played as a centre back. He is of British and Thai descent.
