= Lew Wai Yip =

Hong Kong footballer

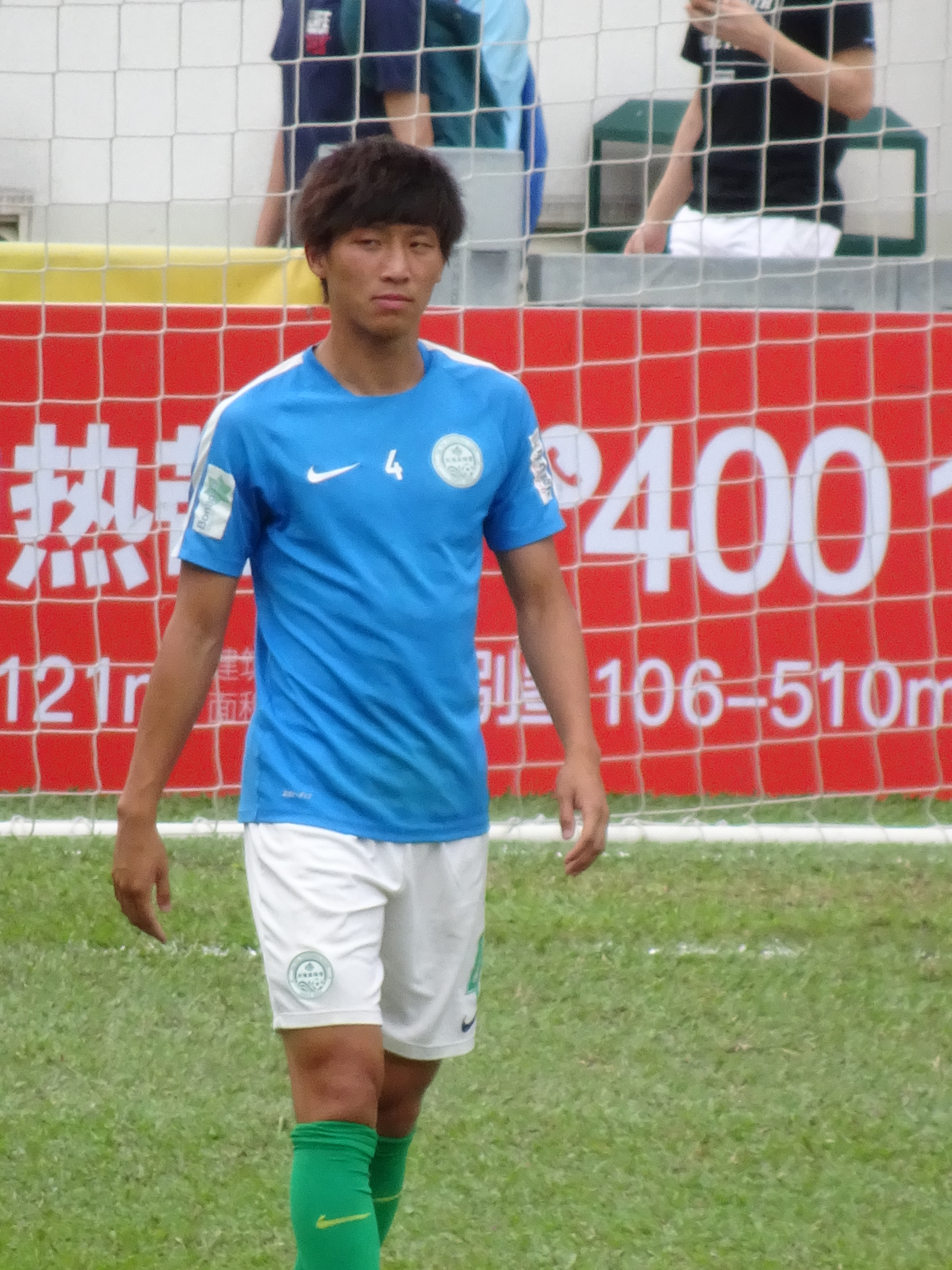

Personal information
- Full name: Lew Wai Yip
- Date of birth: 19 September 1992 (age 34)
- Place of birth: Hong Kong
- Height: 1.73 m (5 ft 8 in)
- Position: Right back

Senior career*
Years	Team	Apps	(Gls)
2009–2012	Kwai Tsing	40	(4)
2012–2015	Yokohama FC Hong Kong	2	(0)
2015–2016	Kwai Tsing	24	(4)
2016–2018	Tai Po	10	(0)
2018–2019	Hoi King	18	(1)
2019–2020	Tai Po	7	(0)
2020–2021	Eastern District	9	(0)
2021–2022	Tai Po	11	(1)
2023–	WSE	64	(4)
- * Club domestic league appearances and goals as of 16 May 2026 ‡ National team caps and goals as of 6 August 2019

Lew Wai Yip (Chinese: 廖偉業; born 19 September 1992) is a former Hong Kong professional footballer who played as a right back.

== Honours ==
=== Club ===
Tai Po

- Hong Kong Sapling Cup: 2016–17
