= Reinaldo Gaúcho =

Brazilian footballer (born 1980)

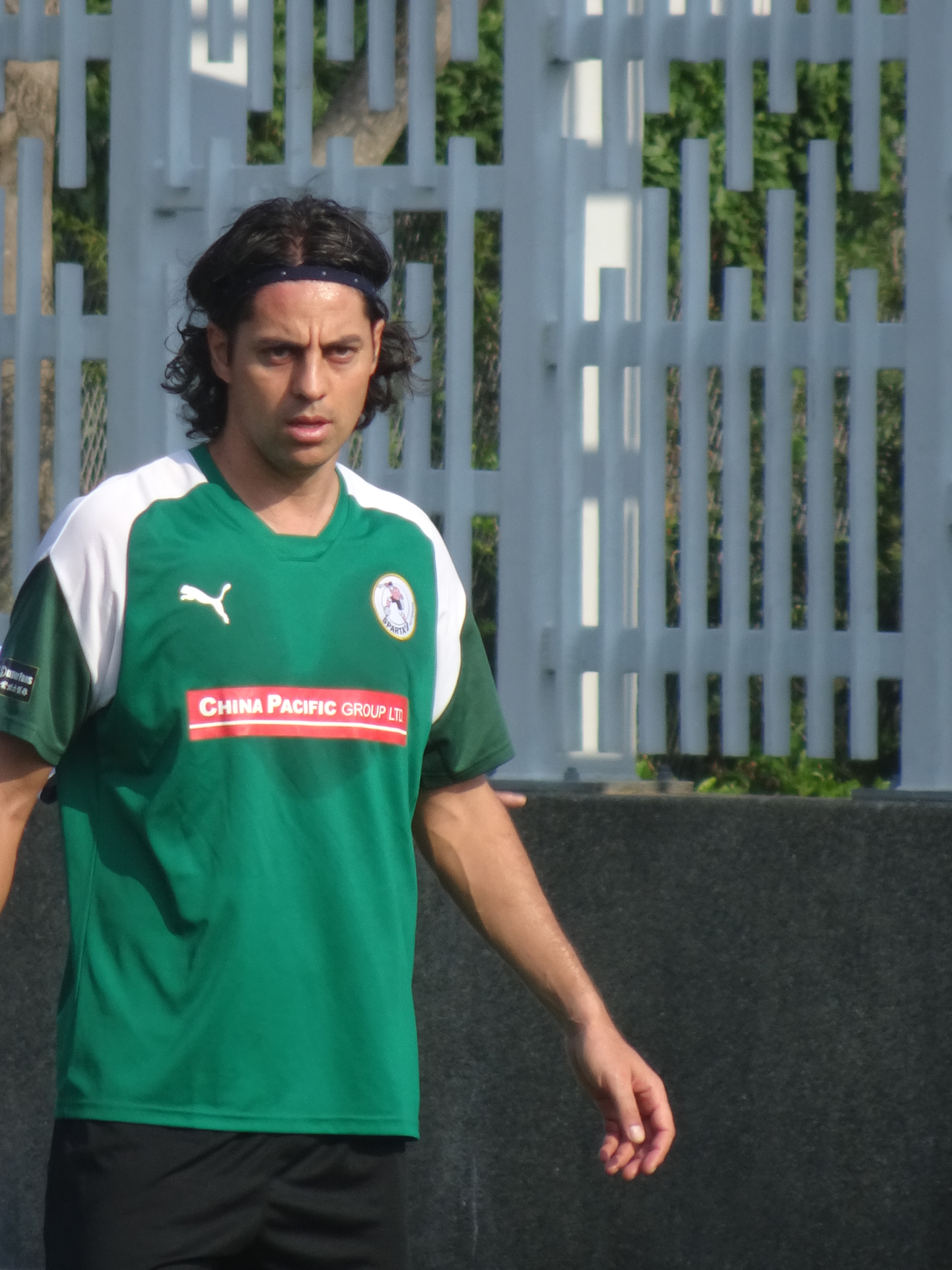

Personal information
- Full name: Reinaldo de Morais Peres
- Date of birth: 22 October 1980 (age 46)
- Place of birth: Passo Fundo, Brazil
- Height: 1.91 m (6 ft 3 in)
- Position: Forward

Senior career*
Years	Team	Apps	(Gls)
1999–2003	Passo Fundo		
2000–2001	→ Vitória (loan)		
2001	→ Londrina (loan)		
2002	→ Guarani (loan)		
2002	→ Caxias do Sul (loan)		
2002	→ Santa Clara (loan)		
2003	Lajeadense		
2004–2005	RS Futebol Clube		
2005	→ Passo Fundo (loan)		
2006	Passo Fundo		
2007	Brasil de Pelotas		
2007	Taquaritinga		
2008	Inter SM		
- Metropolitano
2009–2010	Anhui Jiufang	17	(9)
2011	Santa Cruz	0	(0)
2012	Treze		
2012	CSA		
2012	14 de Julho		
2013	Parnahyba	0	(0)
2013	Itabaiana		
2013–2014	Sun Hei	17	(6)
2014–2015	Eastern	0	(0)
2015	→ Yuen Long (loan)	7	(2)
2015–2016	Yuen Long	3	(0)
2016–2017	Wong Tai Sin	28	(26)
2018	Rangers (HKG)	1	(0)
2018	Cheng Fung	3	(1)
2018–2019	Mutual	16	(7)
2019–2020	Wong Tai Sin	9	(3)
- * Club domestic league appearances and goals as of 30 June 2020

Reinaldo de Morais Peres (Chinese: 連拿度; born 22 May 1980), commonly known as Reinaldo Gaúcho, is a former Brazilian professional footballer who played as a forward.

== Club career ==
Reinaldo joined then-Série C side Treze in January 2012, having spent time with numerous Brazilian clubs, as well as Santa Clara of Portugal and Anhui Jiufang of China. He did not stay long, and by March of the same year, he had left to join Centro Sportivo Alagoano. The Maceió-based side had planned to loan him to a club in Korea, but the player could not agree personal terms and the deal fell through.

After a short spell with 14 de Julho, Reinaldo joined Parnahyba, but only made one appearance before leaving for Itabaiana.

After just one Copa do Brasil game, Reinaldo moved to Hong Kong, joining Sun Hei in 2013.

He joined Yuen Long on loan from Eastern in 2015, having suffered an injury that kept him out of action the previous season, before signing permanently the next season.

In April 2018, he joined Macau side Cheng Fung and scored the first goal in his debut match.

== Career statistics ==
=== Club ===
As of 12 May 2019.

Club	Season	League			National Cup		League Cup		Other		Total	
Club	Season	Division	Apps	Goals	Apps	Goals	Apps	Goals	Apps	Goals	Apps	Goals
Anhui Jiufang	2010	China League One	17	9	0	0	–		0	0	17	9
Santa Cruz	2011	—	0	0	0	0	0	0	5 (Note: Appearances in the Campeonato Gaúcho)	2	5	2
Parnahyba	2013	—	0	0	1 (Note: Appearances in the Copa do Brasil)	0	0	0	0	0	1	0
Sun Hei	2013–14	First Division	17	6	2 (Note: Appearances in the Hong Kong FA Cup)	2	0	0	2 (Note: Appearances in the Hong Kong Senior Shield)	2	21	10
Eastern	2014–15	Premier League	0	0	0	0	0	0	0	0	0	0
Yuen Long (loan)	2014–15	Premier League	7	2	2	1	1 (Note: Appearance in the HKFA League Cup)	0	0	0	10	3
Yuen Long	2015–16	Premier League	3	0	0	0	2	0	1	0	6	0
Yuen Long	Total		10	2	2	1	3	0	1	0	16	3
Wong Tai Sin	2015–16	Premier League	6	1	0	0	0	0	0	0	6	1
Wong Tai Sin	2016–17	First Division	12	16	5	11	0	0	0	0	17	27
Wong Tai Sin	2017–18	First Division	10	9	0	0	0	0	0	0	10	9
Rangers	2017–18	Premier League	1	0	0	0	0	0	0	0	1	0
Cheng Fung	2018	Liga de Elite	3	1	0	0	–		0	0	3	1
Mutual	2018–19	First Division	16	7	1	0	0	0	0	0	17	7
Career total			92	51	11	14	3	0	8	4	114	69
