= Shintaro Harada =

Japanese footballer (born 1980)

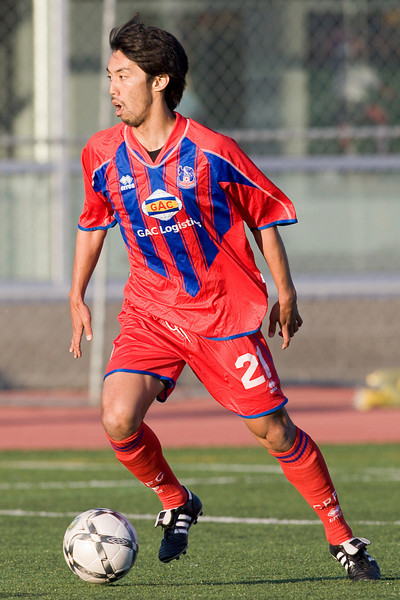
- Harada with Crystal Palace Baltimore in 2008

Personal information
- Date of birth: 8 November 1980 (age 45)
- Place of birth: Sayama, Saitama, Japan
- Height: 1.76 m (5 ft 9 in)
- Positions: Midfielder; defender

Youth career
- 1996–1998: Toin Gakuen High School

Senior career*
Years	Team	Apps	(Gls)
1999–2001	Yokohama F. Marinos	16	(1)
2002	Omiya Ardija	2	(0)
2003–2005	Tokushima Vortis	51	(3)
2005–2006	ALO's Hokuriku	38	(0)
2007–2009	Crystal Palace Baltimore	61	(2)
2010–2012	Pittsburgh Riverhounds	56	(2)
2013–2014	Dayton Dutch Lions	49	(2)
2013	→ Yokohama FC Hong Kong (loan)	5	(0)
2015–2016	Colorado Springs Switchbacks	35	(2)
Total		313	(12)
Medal record
Yokohama F. Marinos
Runner-up	J1 League	2000
Winner	J.League Cup	2001
- * Club domestic league appearances and goals

Shintaro Harada (原田 慎太郎, Harada Shintaro; born 8 November 1980) is a Japanese former professional footballer who played as a midfielder or defender.

== Career ==
=== Japan ===
Shin played alongside Japanese national hero Shunsuke Nakamura, who also started his career at Yokohama. In 2002 acquired by Omiya Ardija and then Tokushima Vortis.

He played part of the 2005 season and all of the 2006 season for ALO's Hokuriku of the Japan Football League in Japan.

=== Crystal Palace Baltimore ===
In his first season in Baltimore, Harada was named to the USL Second Division All-League Second-Team, and followed that up by being named in the USL Second Division All-League First-Team in 2008, 2009, and 2010.

Harada has become USL-2 All-League regular by making his fourth consecutive appearance on an All-League team. He was also the Most Valuable Defender finalist in 2009, and earned that award in 2010. He is nominated as 2010 USL Second Division Most Valuable Player.

During the 2008 off-season, several Major League Soccer clubs showed interest in him, and invited to take part in their trials such by Chicago Fire, Real Salt Lake, and San Jose Earthquakes, but due to injury had to return to Palace for the 2009 season.

Following his impressive performances in the 2009 season, Harada went on trial at Baltimore's English parent club, Crystal Palace.

After three months of training with Crystal Palace F.C., he was selected as the "Palace's Other Player Of The Year" on Crystal Palace's official club magazine, and featured also on Major League Soccer's expansion team Philadelphia Union's official website as a strong candidate for the club's tryout.

=== Pittsburgh Riverhounds ===
On 22 March 2010, the Pittsburgh Riverhounds announced the signing of Harada to a contract for the 2010 season.

While in the second division, Harada won the league's USL Second Division All-League First Team for 4 consecutive years. He re-signed with Pittsburgh, in the USL Pro league, on 21 February 2011.

=== Dayton Dutch Lions ===
After the conclusion of the 2012 season, Harada was invited to tryout with CE Sabadell FC that plays in Spanish Segunda División. Before the USL Pro season started, Harada signed with Dayton Dutch Lions, where he led the club into the playoffs for the first time in club history.

=== Colorado Springs Switchbacks ===
On 12 February 2015, The Colorado Springs Switchbacks FC announced the signing of Harada for the 2015 season. This will be Harada's 3rd team in USL PRO. Head Coach Steve Trittschuh praised that "Harada has been a great leader for us and role model for the younger players". On 23 June 2015, Harada made his 100th appearance in United Soccer League as the first Japanese in league history. Harada ended his first season with the Colorado Springs Switchbacks FC with 2 goals and 2 assists and logged 2,000 minutes of play time.

On 12 January 2016, it was announced that Harada had resigned for Colorado Springs Switchbacks FC for the 2016 USL Pro season.

=== Hong Kong ===
Upon conclusion of USL Pro 2013 season, Harada announced he would sign with Yokohama FC Hong Kong on a loan deal until 31 January 2014.

=== Retirement ===
After retiring in 2017, he became a scout for the Japanese J.League side FC Tokyo. In 2019, it was announced that he became the scout for Omiya Ardija, in J.League, where he played as a player back in 2002.

== Style of play ==
He played as a utility player who played both holding midfielder, and center defender by being selected to All-League First-Team for both positions. He was known for his play making in the middle. He admires the Mexican National Team's Rafael Márquez, and FC Barcelona's Pep Guardiola.

Has been reported about his "the dedicated — almost spartan — approach" with his profession

== Career statistics ==
Appearances and goals by club, season and competition
Club	Season	League			National cup (Note: Includes Emperor's Cup, Open Cup, Hong Kong FA Cup)		League cup (Note: Includes J.League Cup, Hong Kong League Cup)		Total	
Club	Season	Division	Apps	Goals	Apps	Goals	Apps	Goals	Apps	Goals
Yokohama F. Marinos	1999	J1 League	0	0	0	0	1	0	1	0
Yokohama F. Marinos	2000	J1 League	16	1	0	0	2	0	18	1
Yokohama F. Marinos	2001	J1 League	0	0	0	0	0	0	0	0
Yokohama F. Marinos	Total		16	1	0	0	3	0	19	1
Omiya Ardija	2002	J2 League	2	0	0	0	–		2	0
Tokushima Vortis (Note: "Otsuka Pharmaceutical" until 2004)	2003	Japan Football League	27	1	3	0	–		30	1
Tokushima Vortis	2004	Japan Football League	22	2	1	0	–		23	2
Tokushima Vortis	2005	J2 League	2	0	0	0	–		2	0
Tokushima Vortis	Total		51	3	4	0	0	0	55	3
ALO's Hokuriku	2005	Japan Football League	11	0	3	0	–		14	0
ALO's Hokuriku	2006	Japan Football League	27	0	–		–		27	0
ALO's Hokuriku	Total		38	0	3	0	0	0	41	0
Crystal Palace Baltimore	2007	USL Second Division	20	0	1	0	–		21	0
Crystal Palace Baltimore	2008	USL Second Division	21	2	4	0	–		25	2
Crystal Palace Baltimore	2009	USL Second Division	20	0	1	0	–		21	0
Crystal Palace Baltimore	Total		61	2	6	0	–		67	2
Pittsburgh Riverhounds	2010	USL Second Division	17	0	1	0	–		18	0
Pittsburgh Riverhounds	2011	USL Pro	18	2	1	0	–		19	2
Pittsburgh Riverhounds	2012	USL Pro	21	0			–		21	0
Pittsburgh Riverhounds	Total		56	2	2	0	–		58	2
Dayton Dutch Lions	2013	USL Pro	24	1	1	0	–		25	1
Dayton Dutch Lions	2014	USL Pro	25	1			–		25	1
Dayton Dutch Lions	Total		49	2	1	0	–		50	2
Yokohama FC Hong Kong (loan)	2013	Hong Kong First Division	5	0			–		5	0
Colorado Springs Switchbacks	2015	USL Pro	28	2	2	0	–		30	2
Colorado Springs Switchbacks	2016	USL Pro	7	0	1	0	–		8	0
Colorado Springs Switchbacks	Total		35	2	3	0	–		38	2
Career total			313	12	19	0	3	0	335	12

== Honors and awards ==
Yokohama F. Marinos

- J1 League Stage 1 Champion: 2000

Individual

- 2015 - First Japanese to appear in 100 games in United Soccer League
- 2010 - USL Second Division Most Valuable Player Finalist
- 2010 - USL Second Division Most Valuable Defender
- 2010 - USL Second Division All-League First Team
- 2009 - Crystal Palace F.C.: "Palace's Other Player Of The Year"
- 2009 - USL Second Division All-League First-Team
- 2009 - USL Second Division Most Valuable Defender Finalist
- 2008 - USL Second Division All-League First-Team
- 2007 - USL Second Division All-League Second-Team
