= Mirko Teodorović =

Serbian footballer

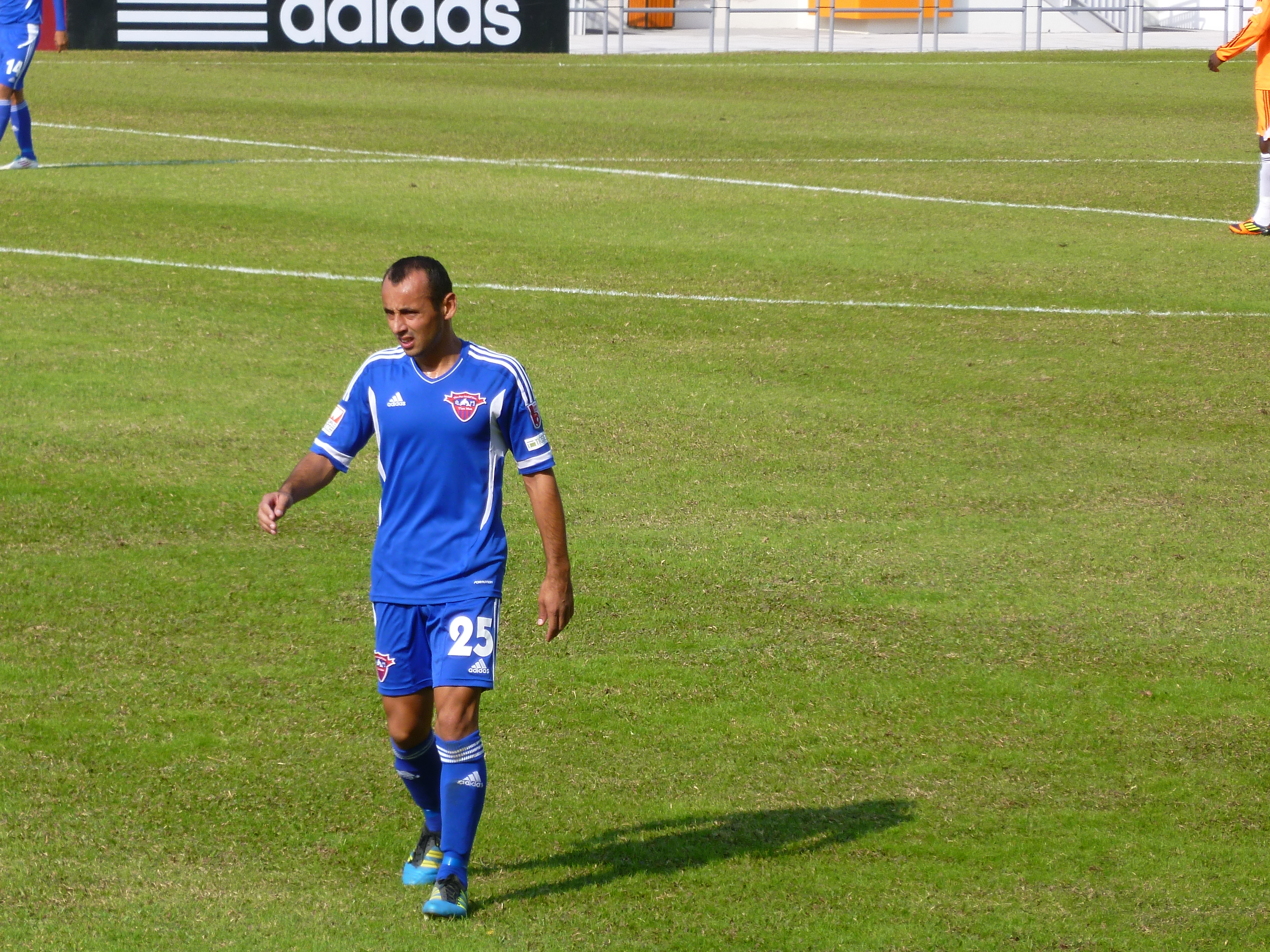
- Teodorović with Tuen Mun in 2011

Personal information
- Full name: Mirko Teodorović
- Date of birth: 6 August 1978 (age 48)
- Place of birth: Sremska Mitrovica, SFR Yugoslavia
- Height: 1.70 m (5 ft 7 in)
- Position: Midfielder

Senior career*
Years	Team	Apps	(Gls)
1997–1999	Srem		
1999–2002	Obilić	57	(2)
2003	Loznica	12	(0)
2003	Žepče	14	(0)
2004–2006	Zemun	70	(1)
2007	Rad	16	(0)
2007–2008	Nejmeh	2	(0)
2008–2009	Rad	21	(2)
2009	Metalac Gornji Milanovac	11	(1)
2010	Shatin	8	(0)
2010–2012	Tuen Mun	33	(0)
2012–2013	Yokohama FC Hong Kong	17	(0)
2013–2014	Sun Hei	17	(0)
2014–2016	Wong Tai Sin	31	(0)
2016–2017	Biu Chun Glory Sky	13	(0)
2017–2022	Podrinje Mačvanska Mitrovica		
Total		322	(6)
- * Club domestic league appearances and goals as of 1 March 2020

Mirko Teodorović (Serbian Cyrillic: Мирко Теодоровић; born 6 August 1978) is a former Serbian professional footballer who played as a midfielder.

During his journeyman career, Teodorović spent seven and a half years in Hong Kong, representing six different clubs.
