= Park Tae-hong =

South Korean footballer (born 1991)

Park Tae-Hong
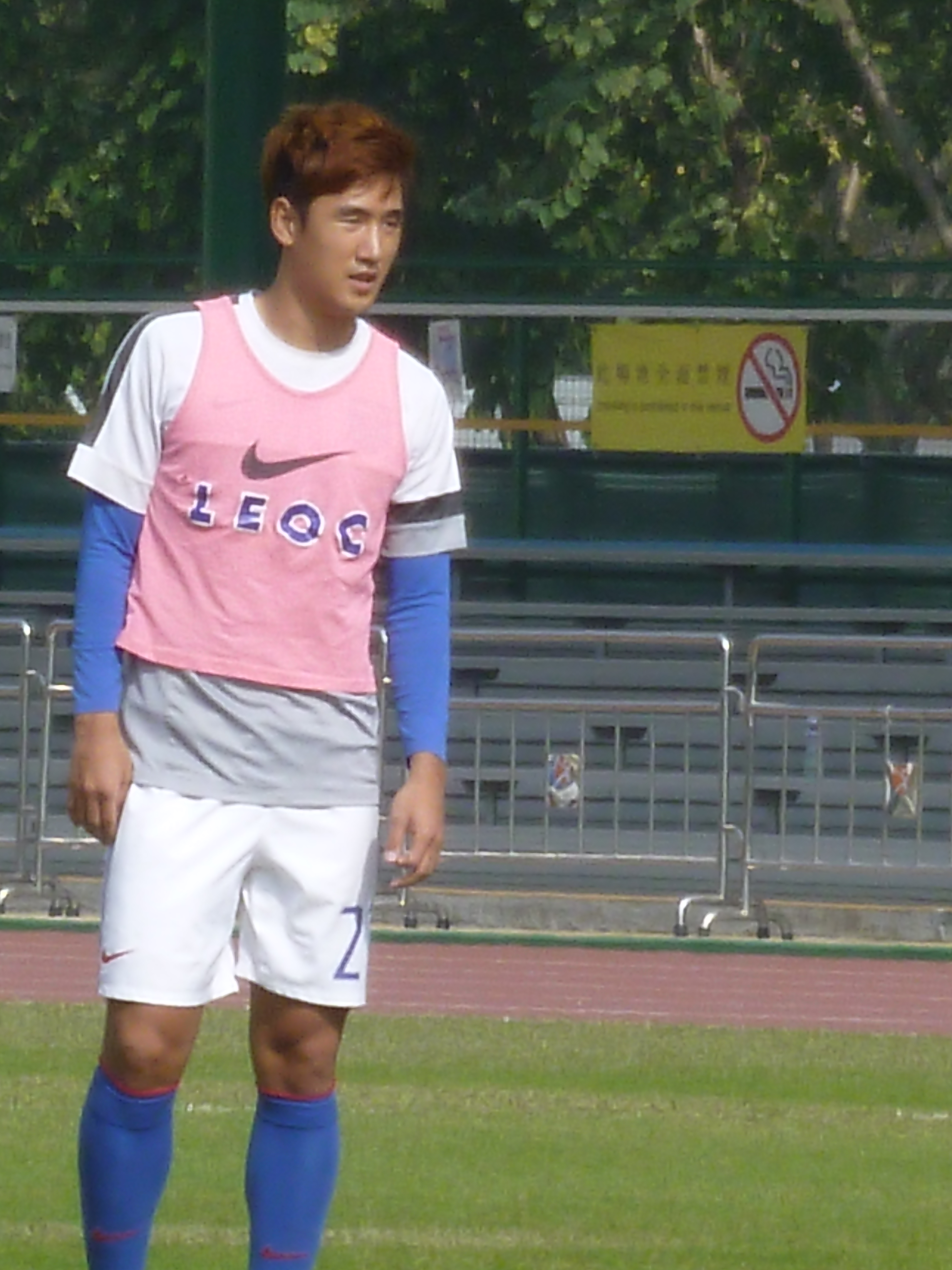

Personal information
- Date of birth: March 25, 1991 (age 35)
- Place of birth: South Korea
- Height: 1.85 m (6 ft 1 in)
- Position: Defender

Team information
- Current team: Busan Transportation Corporation FC
- Number: 28

Senior career*
Years	Team	Apps	(Gls)
2011–2013	Yokohama FC	28	(0)
2013–2014	Yokohama FC Hong Kong	17	(0)
2014	Kataller Toyama	12	(0)
2015	Yokohama FC	35	(1)
2016–2017	Daegu FC	48	(1)
2018	Busan IPark	4	(0)
2019–2020	Gyeongnam FC	3	(0)
2021	Bucheon FC 1995	12	(0)
2022-	Busan Transportation Corporation FC	25	(2)
- * Club domestic league appearances and goals as of 20 October 2022

Park Tae-Hong (Korean: 박태홍; born March 25, 1991) is a South Korean football player who currently plays for K3 League side Busan Transportation Corporation FC.

== Club statistics ==
Club performance			League		Cup		Total	
Season	Club	League	Apps	Goals	Apps	Goals	Apps	Goals
Japan			League		Emperor's Cup		Total	
2011	Yokohama FC	J2 League	25	0	1	0	26	0
2012	Yokohama FC	J2 League	3	0	0	0	3	0
2013	Yokohama FC	J2 League	0	0	0	0	0	0
Country	Japan		28	0	1	0	29	0
Hong Kong			League		Shield & Cup		Total	
2013–14	Yokohama FC Hong Kong	First Division	0	0	0	0	0	0
Country	Hong Kong		0	0	0	0	0	0
Total			28	0	1	0	29	0
