= 2013–14 Happy Valley AA season =

Happy Valley
2013–14 season
- Chairman: Pui Kwan Kay
- Head Coach: Sergio Timoner (Until 8 October 2013); Paul Foster (From 8 October 2013)
- Home Ground: Siu Sai Wan Sports Ground (Capacity: 12,000); During Renovation of Siu Sai Wan SG: Tai Po Sports Ground (Capacity: 3,000)
- First Division: 4th (alphabetically)
- Senior Shield: TBD
- FA Cup: TBD
| Home colours | Away colours |

The 2013–14 season is Happy Valley's 48th season in the Hong Kong First Division League, as well as their debut season after their promotion to the top-tier division in 2012–13 season. Happy Valley will compete in the First Division League, Senior Challenge Shield and FA Cup in this season.

== Key events ==
- 5 June 2013: Hong Kong midfielder Yeung Chi Lun joins the club from First Division club Sunray Cave JC Sun Hei for free.
- 8 June 2013: Cameroon-born Hong Kong striker Julius Akosah joins the club from fellow First Division club Biu Chun Rangers for an undisclosed fee.
- 8 June 2013: Cameroon-born Hong Kong midfielder Wilfred Bamnjo joins the club from fellow First Division club Biu Chun Rangers for an undisclosed fee.
- 8 June 2013: Hong Kong goalkeeper Pang Tsz Kin joins the club from newly relegated Second Division club Wofoo Tai Po for free.
- 8 June 2013: Hong Kong midfielder Cheng Chi Wing joins the club from fellow First Division club Royal Southern for an undisclosed fee.
- 8 June 2013: Hong Kong midfielder Wong Yim Kwan joins the club from newly relegated Second Division club Wofoo Tai Po for free.
- 8 June 2013: Hong Kong striker Yan Pak Long joins the club from Second Division club Wing Yee for free.
- 8 June 2013: Hong Kong defender To Philip Michael joins the club from fellow First Division club Royal Southern for an undisclosed fee.
- 8 June 2013: Hong Kong defender Chu Ka Chun joins the club from fellow First Division club Yokohama FC Hong Kong for an undisclosed fee.
- 19 June 2013: The club reveals their squad for the new season with 15 players will stay at the club.
- 25 June 2013: The club fails to meet an agreement with Lau Ka Shing and therefore he is free to leave the club.
- 28 June 2013: Hong Kong midfielder Choi Kwok Wai joins the club from fellow First Division club Sunray Cave JC Sun Hei for an undisclosed fee.
- 5 July 2013: Paraguayan defender Pablo Leguizamón Arce joins the club on loan from Primera B Nacional club Colegiales until the end of season.
- 5 July 2013: Argentinian midfielder Jonathan Leonel Acosta joins the club on loan from Argentine Torneo Argentino B club 9 de Julio de Morteros until the end of season.
- 5 July 2013: Argentinian striker Diego Daniel Cañete joins the club on loan from Argentine Primera División club Club Atlético Belgrano until the end of season.
- 9 July 2013: Argentinian goalkeeper Mauro Andrés Beltramella joins the club from Argentine Torneo Argentino A club Unión de Mar del Plata for an undisclosed fee.
- 31 July 2013: Montenegrin goalkeeper Darko Božović joins the club on loan from Serbian First League club FK Bežanija until the end of the season.
- 31 July 2013: Argentinian striker Leonardo Abálsamo joins the club on loan from Argentinian club Sportivo Peñarol until the end of the season.
- 31 July 2013: Croatian defender Saša Mus joins the club on loan from Bosnian Premier League club NK Zvijezda Gradačac until the end of the season.
- 8 October 2013: Head coach Sergio Timoner resigns and is promoted as the Technical Director of the club. The club appoints Paul Foster as the new head coach.
- 1 January 2014: Hong Kong goalkeeper Leung Man Fai leaves the club and joins fellow First Division club Eastern Salon for an undisclosed fee.
- 6 January 2014: After losing to Sunray Cave JC Sun Hei by 0–5 at Tsing Yi Sports Ground, the ICAC takes away 19 players and staff including Darko Božović and Saša Mus on allegations of match fixing.
- 12 February 2014: The Hong Kong FA announced that Happy Valley and fellow first division club Tuen Mun will be suspended for the rest of the season pending an ICAC investigation on allegations of match fixing and bad financial circumstances.
- 8 March 2014: Hong Kong midfielder Choi Kwok Wai leaves the club and joins fellow First Division club Sun Pegasus on a free transfer.

== Players ==
=== Squad information ===
| N | P | Nat. | Name | Date of birth | Age | Since | Previous club | Notes |
|---|---|---|---|---|---|---|---|---|
| 1 | GK | (Montenegro) | Darko Božović^{FP} | 9 August 1978 | 35 | 2013 | (Serbia) FK Bežanija | |
| 3 | DF | (Hong Kong) | Ma Siu Kwan^{LP} | 28 March 1991 | 23 | 2012 | (Hong Kong) Tuen Mun | |
| 4 | MF | (Ghana) | Anthony Dela Nyatepe^{LP} | 10 June 1985 | 28 | 2010 | (Hong Kong) Double Flower | Second nationality: Hong Kong |
| 5 | DF | (Croatia) | Saša Mus^{FP} | 19 July 1986 | 27 | 2013 | (Bosnia and Herzegovina) Zvijezda | |
| 6 | DF | (Paraguay) | Pablo Leguizamón Arce^{FP} | 5 October 1982 | 31 | 2013 | (Argentina) Colegiales | Second nationality: Argentina; On loan from Colegiales |
| 7 | FW | (Hong Kong) | Yan Pak Long^{LP} | 16 June 1990 | 23 | 2013 | (Hong Kong) Wing Yee | |
| 9 | FW | (Argentina) | Leonardo Abálsamo^{FP} | 5 October 1982 | 31 | 2013 | (Argentina) Sportivo Peñarol | |
| 10 | MF | (Argentina) | Jonathan Leonel Acosta^{FP} | 11 October 1988 | 25 | 2013 | (Argentina) 9 de Julio de Morteros | |
| 11 | MF | (Hong Kong) | Li Chun Yip^{LP} | 18 September 1981 | 32 | 2012 | (Hong Kong) Wofoo Tai Po | Team captain |
| 13 | DF | (Hong Kong) | Tai Sze Chung^{LP} | 25 October 1989 | 24 | 2009 | (Hong Kong) Mutual | |
| 15 | DF | (Democratic Republic of the Congo) | Muenyi Muana Lukalu^{FP} | 18 May 1974 | 40 | 2011 | (Hong Kong) Tai Chung | Second nationality: Hong Kong |
| 16 | FW | (Hong Kong) | Leung Magnus^{LP} | 29 July 1988 | 25 | 2013 (Winter) | (Hong Kong) Yuen Long | |
| 17 | DF | (Hong Kong) | To Philip Michael^{LP} | 20 December 1990 | 23 | 2013 | (Hong Kong) Royal Southern | |
| 18 | MF | (China) | Fan Weijun^{LP} | 20 November 1978 | 35 | 2012 | (Hong Kong) Biu Chun Rangers | Second nationality: Hong Kong |
| 20 | MF | (Hong Kong) | Wong Yim Kwan^{LP} | 1 August 1992 | 21 | 2013 | (Hong Kong) Wofoo Tai Po | |
| 21 | FW | (Hong Kong) | Tsang Kam Hung^{LP} | 25 October 1986 | 27 | 2011 | (Hong Kong) Wanchai | |
| 22 | FW | (Hong Kong) | Julius Akosah^{LP} | 16 December 1982 | 31 | 2013 | (Hong Kong) Biu Chun Rangers | Second nationality: Cameroon |
| 24 | DF | (Hong Kong) | Wong Chun Lam^{LP} | | | 2012 | (Hong Kong) Kwai Tsing | |
| 26 | FW | (Hong Kong) | Lau Ka Shing^{LP} | 13 August 1989 | 24 | 2012 | (Hong Kong) TSW Pegasus | |
| 27 | MF | (Hong Kong) | Yeung Chi Lun^{LP} | 20 November 1989 | 24 | 2013 | (Hong Kong) Sunray Cave JC Sun Hei | |
| 28 | MF | (Cameroon) | Wilfred Bamnjo^{LP} | 27 March 1980 | 34 | 2013 | (Hong Kong) Biu Chun Rangers | Second nationality: Hong Kong |
| 29 | MF | (Hong Kong) | Chan Lok Woon^{LP} | 16 January 1996 | 18 | 2011 | Youth system | |
| 31 | MF | (Hong Kong) | Cheng Chi Wing^{LP} | 17 April 1983 | 31 | 2013 | (Hong Kong) Royal Southern | |
| 32 | DF | (Hong Kong) | Tam Ho Bong^{LP} | 23 March 1989 | 25 | 2012 | (Hong Kong) Sham Shui Po | |
| 33 | GK | (Hong Kong) | Pang Tsz Kin^{LP} | 16 December 1986 | 27 | 2013 | (Hong Kong) Wofoo Tai Po | |
| 39 | FW | (Hong Kong) | Chao Pengfei^{LP} | 11 July 1987 | 26 | 2013 | (Hong Kong) Biu Chun Rangers | On loan from Tuen Mun; Second nationality: China |
| TBA | MF | (Equatorial Guinea) | Iván Zarandona^{FP} | 9 May 1980 | 33 | 2013 | (Spain) Noja | Second nationality: Spain |
| TBA | FW | (Equatorial Guinea) | Chupe^{FP} | 30 August 1980 | 33 | 2013 | (Hungary) Kazincbarcikai | Second nationality: Spain |

Last update: 1 January 2014
Source: Happy Valley
Ordered by squad number.
^{LP}Local player; ^{FP}Foreign player; ^{NR}Non-registered player

=== Transfers ===
==== In ====
| # | Position | Player | Transferred from | Fee | Date | Team | Source |
|---|---|---|---|---|---|---|---|
| 37 | MF | (Hong Kong) Yeung Chi Lun | (Hong Kong) Sunray Cave JC Sun Hei | Free transfer | 5 June 2013 | First-team | |
| 22 | FW | (Hong Kong) Julius Akosah | (Hong Kong) Biu Chun Rangers | Undisclosed | 8 June 2013 | First team | |
| 28 | MF | (Cameroon) Wilfred Bamnjo | (Hong Kong) Biu Chun Rangers | Undisclosed | 8 June 2013 | First team | |
| 33 | GK | (Hong Kong) Pang Tsz Kin | (Hong Kong) Wofoo Tai Po | Free transfer | 8 June 2013 | First team | |
| 20 | MF | (Hong Kong) Wong Yim Kwan | (Hong Kong) Wofoo Tai Po | Free transfer | 8 June 2013 | First team | |
| 31 | MF | (Hong Kong) Cheng Chi Wing | (Hong Kong) Royal Southern | Undisclosed | 8 June 2013 | First team | |
| 7 | FW | (Hong Kong) Yan Pak Long | (Hong Kong) Wing Yee | Free transfer | 8 June 2013 | First team | |
| 17 | DF | (Hong Kong) To Philip Michael | (Hong Kong) Royal Southern | Undisclosed | 8 June 2013 | First team | |
| | DF | (Hong Kong) Chu Ka Chun | Yokohama FC Hong Kong | Undisclosed | 8 June 2013 | First team | |
| 14 | MF | (Hong Kong) Choi Kwok Wai | (Hong Kong) Sunray Cave JC Sun Hei | Free transfer | 28 June 2013 | First team | |

==== Out ====
| # | Position | Player | Transferred to | Fee | Date | Team | Source |
|---|---|---|---|---|---|---|---|
| 2 | MF | (Hong Kong) Liu Chun Yip | Unattached (Released) | Free transfer | 19 June 2013 | First team | |
| 7 | MF | (Hong Kong) Li Shu San | Unattached (Released) | Free transfer | 19 June 2013 | First team | |
| 9 | FW | (Hong Kong) So Sheung Kwai | Unattached (Released) | Free transfer | 19 June 2013 | First team | |
| 16 | MF | (Hong Kong) So Hong Shing | Unattached (Released) | Free transfer | 19 June 2013 | First team | |
| 20 | MF | (Hong Kong) Sin Ka Yue | Unattached (Released) | Free transfer | 19 June 2013 | First team | |
| 28 | MF | (Hong Kong) Tse Tin Yau | Unattached (Released) | Free transfer | 19 June 2013 | First team | |
| 31 | GK | (Hong Kong) Cheung Wai Hong | Unattached (Released) | Free transfer | 19 June 2013 | First team | |
| 10 | FW | (Hong Kong) Lau Ka Shing | Unattached (Released) | Free transfer | 25 June 2013 | First team | |

==== Loan In ====
| # | Position | Player | Loaned from | Date | Loan expires | Team | Source |
|---|---|---|---|---|---|---|---|
| | DF | (Paraguay) Pablo Leguizamón Arce | (Argentina) Colegiales | 4 July 2013 | 30 June 2014 | First team | |
| | MF | (Argentina) Jonathan Leonel Acosta | (Argentina) 9 de Julio de Morteros | 4 July 2013 | 30 June 2014 | First team | |
| | FW | (Argentina) Diego Daniel Cañete | (Argentina) Belgrano | 4 July 2013 | 30 June 2014 | First team | |
| | GK | (Argentina) Mauro Andrés Beltramella | (Argentina) Unión de Mar del Plata | 9 July 2013 | 30 June 2014 | First team | |
| | GK | (Montenegro) Darko Božović | (Serbia) FK Bežanija | 31 July 2013 | 30 June 2014 | First team | |
| | FW | (Argentina) Leonardo Abálsamo | (Argentina) Sportivo Peñarol | 31 July 2013 | 30 June 2014 | First team | |
| | DF | (Croatia) Saša Mus | (Bosnia and Herzegovina) Zvijezda | 31 July 2013 | 30 June 2014 | First team | |
| | FW | (Hong Kong) Chao Pengfei | (Hong Kong) Tuen Mun | 28 September 2013 | 31 May 2014 | First team | |

==== Loan out ====
| # | Position | Player | Loaned to | Date | Loan expires | Team | Source |

== Club ==
=== Coaching staff ===
| Position | Staff |
|---|---|
| Manager | (Hong Kong) Kwong Hiu Ming |
| Head Coach | (Argentina) Sergio Timoner |
| Assistant Coach | (Hong Kong) Li Chun Yip |
| Assistant Coach | (Hong Kong) Sin Ka Yue |
| Assistant Coach | (China) Fan Weijun |
| Goalkeeper Coach | (Hong Kong) Cheung Wai Hong |
| Technical Director | (Northern Ireland) Roy Millar |
| Technical Director | (England) Keith Blunt |

Last updated: 4 July 2013

== Squad statistics ==
=== Overall Stats ===
| | First Division | Senior Shield | FA Cup | Total Stats |
|---|---|---|---|---|
| Games played | 1 | 0 | 0 | 1 |
| Games won | 0 | 0 | 0 | 0 |
| Games drawn | 0 | 0 | 0 | 0 |
| Games lost | 1 | 0 | 0 | 1 |
| Goals for | 0 | 0 | 0 | 0 |
| Goals against | 3 | 0 | 0 | 3 |
| Players used | 14 | 0 | 0 | 14^{1} |
| Yellow cards | 5 | 0 | 0 | 5 |
| Red cards | 0 | 0 | 0 | 0 |

Last updated: 13 October 2013
Source: Player Stats

Players Used: Happy Valley have used a total of 14 different players in all competitions.

=== Squad Stats ===
| | | | | Total | | | | Hong Kong First Division League | | Senior Challenge Shield | | FA Cup | | |
| N | Pos. | Name | Nat. | GS | App | Gls | Min | App | Gls | App | Gls | App | Gls | Notes |
|---|---|---|---|---|---|---|---|---|---|---|---|---|---|---|
| 1 | GK | Darko Božović | (Montenegro) | 1 | 1 | -3 | 90 | 1 | -3 | | | | | (−) GA |
| 19 | GK | Leung Man Lai | (Hong Kong) | | | | | | | | | | | (−) GA |
| 33 | GK | Pang Tsz Kin | (Hong Kong) | | | | | | | | | | | (−) GA |
| 3 | DF | Ma Siu Kwan | (Hong Kong) | | | | | | | | | | | |
| 5 | DF | Saša Mus | (Croatia) | 1 | 1 | | 90 | 1 | | | | | | |
| 6 | DF | Pablo Leguizamón Arce | (Croatia) | 1 | 1 | | 90 | 1 | | | | | | |
| 13 | DF | Tai Sze Chung | (Hong Kong) | 1 | 1 | | 85 | 1 | | | | | | |
| 15 | DF | Muenyi Muana Lukalu | (Democratic Republic of the Congo) | 1 | 1 | | 90 | 1 | | | | | | |
| 17 | DF | To Philip Michael | (Hong Kong) | | | | | | | | | | | |
| 24 | DF | Wong Chun Lam | (Hong Kong) | 1 | 1 | | 66 | 1 | | | | | | |
| 32 | DF | Tam Ho Bong | (Hong Kong) | | | | | | | | | | | |
| 4 | MF | Anthony Dela Nyatepe | (Ghana) | | 1 | | 5 | 1 | | | | | | |
| 10 | MF | Jonathan Leonel Acosta | (Argentina) | | | | | | | | | | | |
| 11 | MF | Li Chun Yip | (Hong Kong) | 1 | 1 | | 90 | 1 | | | | | | |
| 14 | MF | Choi Kwok Wai | (Hong Kong) | 1 | 1 | | 90 | 1 | | | | | | |
| 18 | MF | Fan Weijun | (China) | | | | | | | | | | | |
| 20 | MF | Wong Yim Kwan | (Hong Kong) | | 1 | | 24 | 1 | | | | | | |
| 27 | MF | Yeung Chi Lun | (Hong Kong) | | | | | | | | | | | |
| 28 | MF | Wilfred Bamnjo | (Cameroon) | 1 | 1 | | 90 | 1 | | | | | | |
| 29 | MF | Chan Lok Woon | (Hong Kong) | | | | | | | | | | | |
| 31 | MF | Cheng Chi Wing | (Hong Kong) | | 1 | | 44 | 1 | | | | | | |
| 7 | FW | Yan Pak Long | (Hong Kong) | | | | | | | | | | | |
| 9 | FW | Leonardo Abálsamo | (Argentina) | | | | | | | | | | | |
| 16 | FW | Leung Magnus | (Hong Kong) | 1 | 1 | | 46 | 1 | | | | | | |
| 21 | FW | Tsang Kam Hung | (Hong Kong) | | | | | | | | | | | |
| 22 | FW | Julius Akosah | (Hong Kong) | | | | | | | | | | | |
| 26 | FW | Lau Ka Shing | (Hong Kong) | 1 | 1 | | 90 | 1 | | | | | | |
| 39 | FW | Chao Pengfei | (Hong Kong) | | | | | | | | | | | |

Last updated: 13 October 2013
Ordered by Position
0 shown as blank

=== Top scorers ===
| Place | Position | Nationality | Number | Name | First Division | Senior Shield | FA Cup | Total |
| TOTALS | | | | | 0 | 0 | 0 | 0 |

=== Disciplinary record ===
Includes all competitive matches. Players listed below made at least one appearance for Southern first squad during the season.

| N | P | Nat. | Name | League | | | Shield | | | FA Cup | | | Others | | | Total | | | Notes |
| N | P | Nat. | Name | Yellow card | Second yellow card | Red card | Yellow card | Second yellow card | Red card | Yellow card | Second yellow card | Red card | Yellow card | Second yellow card | Red card | Yellow card | Second yellow card | Red card | Notes |
| 1 | GK | (Montenegro) | Darko Božović | | | | | | | | | | | | | | | | |
| 4 | MF | (Ghana) | Anthony Dela Nyatepe | | | | | | | | | | | | | | | | |
| 5 | DF | (Croatia) | Saša Mus | | | | | | | | | | | | | | | | |
| 6 | DF | (Croatia) | Pablo Leguizamón Arce | 1 | | | | | | | | | | | | 1 | | | |
| 11 | MF | (Hong Kong) | Li Chun Yip | 1 | | | | | | | | | | | | 1 | | | |
| 13 | DF | (Hong Kong) | Tai Sze Chung | 1 | | | | | | | | | | | | 1 | | | |
| 14 | MF | (Hong Kong) | Choi Kwok Wai | | | | | | | | | | | | | | | | |
| 15 | DF | (Democratic Republic of the Congo) | Muenyi Muana Lukalu | | | | | | | | | | | | | | | | |
| 16 | FW | (Hong Kong) | Leung Magnus | | | | | | | | | | | | | | | | |
| 20 | MF | (Hong Kong) | Wong Yim Kwan | | | | | | | | | | | | | | | | |
| 24 | DF | (Hong Kong) | Wong Chun Lam | | | | | | | | | | | | | | | | |
| 26 | FW | (Hong Kong) | Lau Ka Shing | 1 | | | | | | | | | | | | 1 | | | |
| 28 | MF | (Cameroon) | Wilfred Bamnjo | | | | | | | | | | | | | | | | |
| 31 | MF | (Hong Kong) | Cheng Chi Wing | 1 | | | | | | | | | | | | 1 | | | |

Last updated: 13 October 2013
Source: Competitive matches
Ordered by (red card) , (second yellow card) and (yellow card)
(yellow card) = Number of bookings; (second yellow card) = Number of sending offs after a second yellow card; (red card) = Number of sending offs by a direct red card.

=== Starting 11 ===
This will show the most used players in each position, based on Happy Valley's typical starting formation once the season commences.

=== Substitution Record ===
Includes all competitive matches.

| | | | League | | Shield | | FA Cup | | Others | | Total | |
| No. | Pos | Name | subson | subsoff | subson | subsoff | subson | subsoff | subson | subsoff | subson | subsoff |
Goalkeepers
| 1 | GK | Darko Božović | 0 | 0 | 0 | 0 | 0 | 0 | 0 | 0 | 0 | 0 |
| 19 | GK | Leung Man Lai | 0 | 0 | 0 | 0 | 0 | 0 | 0 | 0 | 0 | 0 |
| 33 | GK | Pang Tsz Kin | 0 | 0 | 0 | 0 | 0 | 0 | 0 | 0 | 0 | 0 |
Defenders
| 3 | DF | Ma Siu Kwan | 0 | 0 | 0 | 0 | 0 | 0 | 0 | 0 | 0 | 0 |
| 5 | DF | Saša Mus | 0 | 0 | 0 | 0 | 0 | 0 | 0 | 0 | 0 | 0 |
| 6 | DF | Pablo Leguizamón Arce | 0 | 0 | 0 | 0 | 0 | 0 | 0 | 0 | 0 | 0 |
| 13 | DF | Tai Sze Chung | 0 | 1 | 0 | 0 | 0 | 0 | 0 | 0 | 0 | 1 |
| 15 | DF | Muenyi Muana Lukalu | 0 | 0 | 0 | 0 | 0 | 0 | 0 | 0 | 0 | 0 |
| 17 | DF | To Philip Michael | 0 | 0 | 0 | 0 | 0 | 0 | 0 | 0 | 0 | 0 |
| 24 | DF | Wong Chun Lam | 0 | 1 | 0 | 0 | 0 | 0 | 0 | 0 | 0 | 1 |
| 32 | DF | Tam Ho Bong | 0 | 0 | 0 | 0 | 0 | 0 | 0 | 0 | 0 | 0 |
Midfielders
| 4 | MF | Anthony Dela Nyatepe | 1 | 0 | 0 | 0 | 0 | 0 | 0 | 0 | 1 | 0 |
| 10 | MF | Jonathan Acosta | 0 | 0 | 0 | 0 | 0 | 0 | 0 | 0 | 0 | 0 |
| 11 | MF | Li Chun Yip | 0 | 0 | 0 | 0 | 0 | 0 | 0 | 0 | 0 | 0 |
| 14 | MF | Choi Kwok Wai | 0 | 0 | 0 | 0 | 0 | 0 | 0 | 0 | 0 | 0 |
| 18 | MF | Fan Weijun | 0 | 0 | 0 | 0 | 0 | 0 | 0 | 0 | 0 | 0 |
| 20 | MF | Wong Yim Kwan | 1 | 0 | 0 | 0 | 0 | 0 | 0 | 0 | 1 | 0 |
| 27 | MF | Yeung Chi Lun | 0 | 0 | 0 | 0 | 0 | 0 | 0 | 0 | 0 | 0 |
| 28 | MF | Wilfred Bamnjo | 0 | 0 | 0 | 0 | 0 | 0 | 0 | 0 | 0 | 2 |
| 29 | MF | Chan Lok Woon | 0 | 0 | 0 | 0 | 0 | 0 | 0 | 0 | 0 | 0 |
| 31 | MF | Cheng Chi Wing | 1 | 0 | 0 | 0 | 0 | 0 | 0 | 0 | 1 | 0 |
Forwards
| 7 | FW | Yan Pak Long | 0 | 0 | 0 | 0 | 0 | 0 | 0 | 0 | 0 | 0 |
| 9 | FW | Leonardo Abálsamo | 0 | 0 | 0 | 0 | 0 | 0 | 0 | 0 | 0 | 0 |
| 16 | FW | Leung Magnus | 0 | 1 | 0 | 0 | 0 | 0 | 0 | 0 | 0 | 1 |
| 21 | FW | Tsang Kam Hung | 0 | 0 | 0 | 0 | 0 | 0 | 0 | 0 | 0 | 0 |
| 22 | FW | Julius Akosah | 0 | 0 | 0 | 0 | 0 | 0 | 0 | 0 | 0 | 0 |
| 26 | FW | Lau Ka Shing | 0 | 0 | 0 | 0 | 0 | 0 | 0 | 0 | 0 | 0 |
| 39 | FW | Chao Pengfei | 0 | 0 | 0 | 0 | 0 | 0 | 0 | 0 | 0 | 0 |

Last updated: 13 October 2013

=== Captains ===
| No. | P | Name | Country | No. games | Notes |
|---|---|---|---|---|---|
| 11 | MF | Li Chun Yip | (Hong Kong) | 1 | Captain |

Last updated: 13 October 2013
Source: Competitive match reports.
Competitive matches only
Matches started as captain only
Country: FIFA nationality; No.: Squad number; P: Position; Name: Player name; No. Games: Number of games started as captain.

== Competitions ==
=== Overall ===
| Competition | Started round | Current position / round | Final position / round | First match | Last match |
|---|---|---|---|---|---|
| Hong Kong First Division League | — | 11th | | 30 August 2013 | |
| Senior Challenge Shield | Quarter-finals | — | | October, 2013 | |
| FA Cup | Quarter-finals | — | | January, 2014 | |

Updated to match played 3 September 2013
Source: Competitions

=== First Division League ===
==== Classification ====
| Pos | Team | Pld | W | D | L | GF | GA | GD | Pts | Qualification or relegation |
|---|---|---|---|---|---|---|---|---|---|---|
| 8 | Sunray Cave JC Sun Hei (R) | 18 | 5 | 4 | 9 | 32 | 41 | −9 | 19 | Relegation to 2014–15 Hong Kong First Division League (Note: Sunray Cave JC Sun Hei & Citizen declined to participate in the 2014–15 Hong Kong Premier League and would self-relegate in the following season.) |
| 9 | Citizen (R) | 18 | 4 | 6 | 8 | 25 | 33 | −8 | 18 | Relegation to 2014–15 Hong Kong First Division League |
| 10 | Yokohama FC Hong Kong | 18 | 3 | 4 | 11 | 25 | 39 | −14 | 13 | |
| 11 | Happy Valley (D, R) | 0 | 0 | 0 | 0 | 0 | 0 | 0 | 0 | Excluded, record expunged Relegation to 2014–15 Hong Kong First Division League (Note: On 13 February 2014, the HKFA announced that as a result of a match-fixing investigation, both Tuen Mun and Happy Valley would be excluded from the league, and their records would be expunged.) |
| 12 | Tuen Mun (D, R) | 0 | 0 | 0 | 0 | 0 | 0 | 0 | 0 | Excluded, record expunged Relegation to 2014–15 Hong Kong First Division League |

Updated to match(es) played on 11 May 2014. Source: Hong Kong Football Association
Rules for classification: 1) points; 2) head-to-head points; 3) head-to-head goal difference; 4) head-to-head goals scored; 5) goal difference; 6) number of goals scored.
(D) Disqualified; (R) Relegated

==== Results summary ====
| Overall | | | | | | | | Home | | | | | | Away | | | | | |
| Pld | W | D | L | GF | GA | GD | Pts | W | D | L | GF | GA | GD | W | D | L | GF | GA | GD |
|---|---|---|---|---|---|---|---|---|---|---|---|---|---|---|---|---|---|---|---|
| 7 | 0 | 1 | 6 | 7 | 19 | −12 | 1 | 0 | 0 | 2 | 3 | 8 | −5 | 0 | 1 | 4 | 4 | 11 | −7 |

Last updated: 15 December 2013.
Source: First Division

==== Results by round ====
| Round | 1 | 2 | 3 | 4 | 5 | 6 | 7 | 8 | 9 | 10 | 11 | 12 | 13 | 14 | 15 | 16 | 17 | 18 | 19 | 20 | 21 | 22 |
|---|---|---|---|---|---|---|---|---|---|---|---|---|---|---|---|---|---|---|---|---|---|---|
| Ground | A | A | A | A | H | H | A | H | H | A | A | H | H | H | A | H | A | A | H | H | H | A |
| Result | L | L | P | D | P | L | L | | | | | | | | | | | | | | | |
| Position | 11 | | | | | | | | | | | | | | | | | | | | | |

Updated to match(es) played on 3 September 2013. Source: Competitive Matches
A = Away; H = Home; W = Win; D = Draw; L = Loss; P = Postponed

== Matches ==
Win Draw Loss Void

=== Pre-season friendlies ===
| 9 August 2013 | Eastern Salon (Hong Kong) | 1 – 1 | (Hong Kong) Happy Valley | Tsing Yi, New Territories |
| 11:30 UTC+8 | Itaparica | | Leung Magnus | Stadium: Tsing Yi Northeast Park |

| 14 August 2013 | Tuen Mun (Hong Kong) | – | (Hong Kong) Happy Valley | Guangzhou, China PR |
| | | | | Stadium: Sanshui Football Training Base |

| 16 August 2013 | Guangdong U-20 (China) | – | (Hong Kong) Happy Valley | Guangzhou, China PR |
| | | | | Stadium: Zhuliao Football Training Base |

| 17 August 2013 | Ex-Guangdong Youth (China) | – | (Hong Kong) Happy Valley | Guangzhou, China PR |
| | | | | Stadium: Yingdong Stadium |

| 18 August 2013 | Happy Valley (Hong Kong) | – | (Hong Kong) Eastern Salon | Guangzhou, China PR |
| | | | | Stadium: Zhuliao Football Training Base |

=== First Division League ===
| 30 August 2013 Round 1 | Sun Pegasus | 3 – 0 | Happy Valley | Mong Kok, Kowloon |
| 20:00 UTC+8 | Raščić 4'; Ju Yingzhi 12'; Chan Pak Hang (yellow card) 22'; Kim Dong-Ryeol 82' | Report | Tai Sze Chung (yellow card) 29'; Arce (yellow card) 47'; Cheng Chi Wing (yellow card) 57'; Li Chun Yip (yellow card) 65'; Lau Ka Shing (yellow card) 75' | Stadium: Mong Kok Stadium (Capacity: 6,680); Attendance: 2,244; Referee: Ng Chiu Kok; Assistant referees: Lam Chi Ho, Chan Siu Hung; Fourth official: Tong Kui Sum |

| 15 September 2013 Round 2 | Tuen Mun | 1 – 0 | Happy Valley | Tuen Mun, New Territories |
| 14:30 UTC+8 | Li Ming (yellow card) 11'; Madjo 90' | Report | (yellow card) 55' Yeung Chi Lun; (yellow card) 60' Lau Ka Shing | Stadium: Tuen Mun Tang Shiu Kin Sports Ground (Capacity: 2,200); Attendance: 471; Referee: Ho Wai Sing; Assistant referees: Lui Siu Chuen, Yu Chun Sun; Fourth official: Tang Hing Fu |

| 22 September 2013 Round 3 | Eastern Salon | P – P | Happy Valley | Tsuen Wan, New Territories |
| 14:30 UTC+8 | | | | Stadium: Shing Mun Valley Sports Ground (Capacity: 5,000) |

| 29 September 2013 Round 4 | I-Sky Yuen Long | 2 – 2 | Happy Valley | Yuen Long, New Territories |
| 17:30 UTC+8 | Cheung Tsz Kin (yellow card) 52'; Mijanović 78'; Hui Wang Fung 90+3' | Report | 29' Acosta; 63' (o.g.) Mijanović; (yellow card) 89' Li Chun Yip | Stadium: Yuen Long Stadium (Capacity: 4,932); Attendance: 872; Referee: Ho Wai Sing; Assistant referees: Yu Chun Sun, Luk Kin Sun; Fourth official: Ng Kai Lam |

| 5 October 2013 Round 5 | Happy Valley | P – P | Yokohama FC Hong Kong | Tai Po, New Territories |
| 14:30 UTC+8 | | | | Stadium: Tai Po Sports Ground (Capacity: 3,000) |

| 20 October 2013 Round 6 | Happy Valley | 1 – 4 | South China | Tai Po, New Territories |
| 14:30 UTC+8 | Acosta (yellow card) 20'; Choi Kwok Wai 28'; Chao Pengfei (yellow card) 89' | Report | 36' Lee Wai Lim; 41' Lee Hong Lim; 64' Kwok Kin Pong; 90' (pen.) Barry | Stadium: Tai Po Sports Ground (Capacity: 3,000); Attendance: 1,492; Referee: Tong Kui Sum; Assistant referees: Cheng Oi Cho, Lau Fong Hei; Fourth official: Yau Tsz Yeung |

| 26 October 2013 Round 7 | Citizen | 3 – 2 | Happy Valley | Tsing Yi, New Territories |
| 14:30 UTC+8 | Nakamura 17', 79'; Paulinho 34'; Chan Hin Kwong (yellow card) 45+1'; Krasić (yellow card) 77' | Report | (yellow card) 15' Li Chun Yip; (yellow card) 23' Mus; (yellow card) 50' Bamnjo; (yellow card) 55' (red card) 63' Fan Weijun; (yellow card) 64' Akosah; 73', 90+4' Abalsamo | Stadium: Tsing Yi Sports Ground (Capacity: 1,500); Attendance: 223; Referee: Ng Chiu Kok; Assistant referees: Chan Shui Hung, Yau Tsz Yeung; Fourth official: Wong Yin Wai |

| 3 November 2013 Round 3P | Eastern Salon | 2 – 0 | Happy Valley | Tsuen Wan, New Territories |
| 14:30 UTC+8 | Clayton 38'; Tse Man Wing 81' (yellow card) 90+4' | Report | (yellow card) 45+1' Abálsamo; (yellow card) 73' Bamnjo | Stadium: Shing Mun Valley Sports Ground (Capacity: 5,000); Attendance: 442; Referee: Lau Fong Hei; Assistant referees: Chan Shui Hung, Sarao Amarjit Singh; Fourth official: Yu Kin Fung |

| 30 November 2013 Round 8 | Happy Valley | 2 – 4 | Royal Southern | Tai Po, New Territories |
| 14:30 UTC+8 | Acosta 23'; Arce (yellow card) 34'; Akosah 53' | Report | (yellow card) 18' Ip Chung Long; 48', 55', 67' Carril; (yellow card) 59' Li Ngai Hoi; 64' Yago | Stadium: Tai Po Sports Ground (Capacity: 3,000); Attendance: 283; Referee: Lui Siu Chuen; Assistant referees: Chan Shui Hung, Yu Kin Fung; Fourth official: Lo Yuk Ming |

| 21 December 2013 Round 9 | Happy Valley | v | Kitchee | Tai Po, New Territories |
| 14:30 UTC+8 | | | | Stadium: Tai Po Sports Ground (Capacity: 3,000) |

| 5 January 2014 Round 10 | Sunray Cave JC Sun Hei | v | Happy Valley | Tsing Yi, New Territories |
| 17:30 UTC+8 | | | | Stadium: Tsing Yi Sports Ground (Capacity: 1,500) |

| 25 January 2014 Round 11 | Biu Chun Rangers | v | Happy Valley | Sham Shui Po, Kowloon |
| 14:30 UTC+8 | | | | Stadium: Sham Shui Po Sports Ground (Capacity: 2,194) |

| 9 February 2014 Round 12 | Happy Valley | v | Biu Chun Rangers | Tai Po, New Territories |
| 14:30 UTC+8 | | | | Stadium: Tai Po Sports Ground (Capacity: 3,000) |

| 15 February 2014 Round 13 | Happy Valley | v | Citizen | Kowloon Bay, Kowloon |
| 14:30 UTC+8 | | | | Stadium: Kowloon Bay Park (Note: The match will be played at Kowloon Bay Park instead of Happy Valley's home ground Siu Sai Wan Sports Ground and Tai Po Sports Ground.) (Capacity: 1,200) |

| 23 February 2014 Round 14 | Happy Valley | v | Tuen Mun | Tai Po, New Territories |
| 14:30 UTC+8 | | | | Stadium: Tai Po Sports Ground (Capacity: 3,000) |

| 8 March 2014 Round 15 | Yokohama FC Hong Kong | v | Happy Valley | Tseung Kwan O, New Territories |
| 17:30 UTC+8 | | | | Stadium: Tseung Kwan O Sports Ground (Capacity: 3,500) |

| 15 March 2014 Round 16 | Happy Valley | v | I-Sky Yuen Long | Tai Po, New Territories |
| 14:30 UTC+8 | | | | Stadium: Tai Po Sports Ground (Capacity: 3,000) |

| 23 March 2014 Round 17 | Kitchee | v | Happy Valley | Mong Kok, Kowloon |
| 17:30 UTC+8 | | | | Stadium: Mong Kok Stadium (Capacity: 6,680) |

| 29 March 2014 Round 18 | Royal Southern | v | Happy Valley | Aberdeen, Hong Kong Island |
| 14:30 UTC+8 | | | | Stadium: Aberdeen Sports Ground (Capacity: 4,000) |

| 6 April 2014 Round 19 | Happy Valley | v | Sun Pegasus | Siu Sai Wan, Hong Kong Island |
| 17:30 UTC+8 | | | | Stadium: Siu Sai Wan Sports Ground (Capacity: 12,000) |

| 20 April 2014 Round 20 | Happy Valley | v | Eastern Salon | Siu Sai Wan, Hong Kong Island |
| 14:30 UTC+8 | | | | Stadium: Siu Sai Wan Sports Ground (Capacity: 12,000) |

| 3 May 2014 Round 21 | Happy Valley | v | Sunray Cave JC Sun Hei | Tai Po, New Territories |
| 14:30 UTC+8 | | | | Stadium: Tai Po Sports Ground (Capacity: 3,000) |

| 10–11 May 2014 Round 22 | South China | v | Happy Valley | So Kon Po, Hong Kong Island |
| TBC | | | | Stadium: Hong Kong Stadium (Capacity: 40,000) |

=== Senior Shield ===
| 8 December 2013 Quarter-finals | Happy Valley | v | Sun Pegasus | Mong Kok, Kowloon |
| 17:30 UTC+8 | | | | Stadium: Mong Kok Stadium (Capacity: 6,680) |
