= 2013–14 Citizen AA season =

Citizen
2013–14 season
- Chairman: Pui Kwan Kay
- Head Coach: Chu Kwok Kuen
- Home Ground: Tsing Yi Sports Ground (Capacity: 1,500)
- First Division: 6th
- Senior Shield: Quarter-finals
- FA Cup: TBD
Home colours	Away colours

The 2013–14 season is Citizen's 9th consecutive season in the Hong Kong First Division League. Citizen will compete in the First Division League, Senior Challenge Shield and FA Cup in this season.

== Key events ==
- 30 May 2013: Brazilian striker Detinho confirms that he will not retire and has extended a 1-year contract with the club.
- 31 May 2013: Brazilian midfielder Gustavo Claudio da Silva leaves the club and joins fellow First Division club Yuen Long on a free transfer.
- 31 May 2013: Brazilian striker Sandro leaves the club and joins Yuen Long on a free transfer.
- 2 June 2013: Hong Kong defender Chan Siu Yuen joins the club from fellow First Division side Biu Chun Rangers on a free transfer.
- 3 June 2013: Hong Kong international defender Chiu Chun Kit joins fellow First Division club Yuen Long on loan until the end of the season.
- 3 June 2013: Brazilian striker Paulinho Piracicaba signs a 6-month contract extension with the club.
- 3 June 2013: Hong Kong goalkeeper Liu Fu Yuen leaves the club and joins fellow First Division club Yuen Long on a free transfer.
- 6 June 2013: Hong Kong midfielder Michael Campion leaves the club and joins fellow First Division club Sun Pegasus for an undisclosed fee.
- 7 June 2013: Chinese-Hong Kong striker Yuan Yang leaves the club and joins fellow First Division club Sun Pegasus for an undisclosed fee.
- 16 June 2013: Hong Kong midfielder Cheung Yu Sum leaves the club and joins newly promoted First Division club Yuen Long on a free transfer.
- 28 June 2013: The Hong Kong Football Association assigns Tsing Yi Sports Ground as Citizen's home ground in the following season.
- 14 July 2013: Ghana-born naturalised Hong Kong defender Moses Mensah leaves the club and joins fellow First Division club Biu Chun Rangers on a free transfer.
- 15 July 2013: Serbian midfielder Marko Krasić joins the club from Indonesian Premier League club Arema FC for an undisclosed fee.
- 18 July 2013: English-Hong Kong midfielder joins the club from fellow First Division club Kitchee on a free transfer.
- 22 July 2013: Brazilian striker Stefan Pereira joins the club from Brazilian club Esporte Clube Jacuipense for an undisclosed fee.
- 26 September 2013: Brazilian midfielder Fernando Augusto Avezedo Pereira joins the club from Brazilian club EC Jacuipense on an undisclosed fee.

== Players ==
=== Squad information ===
N	P	Nat.	Name	Date of birth	Age	Since	Previous club	Notes
3	DF	(Hong Kong)	Wong Yiu Fu^{LP}	6 August 1981	32	2009	(Hong Kong) Eastern	
4	DF	(Hong Kong)	Sham Kwok Fai^{LP}	30 May 1984	30	2007	(Hong Kong) Happy Valley	Team 1st vice-captain
5	MF	(Serbia)	Marko Krasić^{FP}	1 December 1985	28	2013	(Indonesia) Arema (IPL)	
6	MF	(England)	[[]]^{LP}	3 June 1994	20	2013	(Hong Kong) Kitchee	Second nationality: Hong Kong
7	MF	(Nigeria)	Festus Baise^{FP}	11 April 1980	34	2005	(Hong Kong) South China	Team captain; Second nationality: Hong Kong
8	MF	(Hong Kong)	So Loi Keung^{LP}	27 October 1982	31	2011	(Hong Kong) Kitchee	
9	FW	(Brazil)	Stefan Pereira^{FP}	16 April 1988	26	2013	(Brazil) Jacuipense	
10	FW	(Japan)	Yuto Nakamura^{FP}	23 January 1987	27	2011	Free agent	
11	MF	(Hong Kong)	Boris Si^{LP}	27 July 1994	20	2012	Youth system	
12	DF	(Hong Kong)	Ma Ka Ki^{LP}	8 June 1978	35	2007	Hong Kong FC	
14	MF	(Hong Kong)	Chan Siu Yuen^{LP}	2 November 1987	26	2013	(Hong Kong) Biu Chun Rangers	
16	MF	(Hong Kong)	Tam Lok Hin^{LP}	12 January 1990	24	2009	(Hong Kong) Eastern	
17	DF	(Hong Kong)	Mak Ngo Tung^{LP}	30 December 1994	19	2013	Youth system	
18	FW	(Hong Kong)	Sham Kwok Keung^{LP}	10 September 1985	27	2010	(Hong Kong) Shatin	
19	FW	(Brazil)	Paulinho Piracicaba^{FP}	16 January 1983	31	2007	(Brazil) Olímpia	
20	MF	(Brazil)	Fernando^{FP}	14 November 1986	27	2013	(Brazil) Jacuipense	
23	DF	(Brazil)	Hélio José de Souza Gonçalves^{FP}	31 January 1986	28	2008	(Brazil) Olímpia	
24	MF	(Hong Kong)	Lau Tak Yan^{LP}	1 June 1994	19	2013	Youth system	
25	DF	(Hong Kong)	Young Ho Wang^{LP}	11 September 1993	20	2010	Youth system	
27	DF	(Hong Kong)	Chan Hin Kwong^{LP}	27 February 1988	26	2012	(Hong Kong) Tuen Mun	
28	DF	(Hong Kong)	Chiu Chun Kit^{NR}	4 October 1983	30	2011	(Hong Kong) South China	On loan to Yuen Long
29	GK	(Hong Kong)	Tse Tak Him^{LP}	10 February 1985	29	2004	Hong Kong 08	Team 2nd vice-captain
30	FW	(Brazil)	Detinho^{LP}	11 September 1973	40	2009	(Hong Kong) South Ch/ina	Second nationality: Hong Kong
31	MF	(Ghana)	Okwara Henry Baise^{NR}	16 April 1992	22	2012	(Hong Kong) Wing Yee	
39	GK	(Hong Kong)	Shum Kenrick^{LP}	7 September 1989	24	2012	Youth system	

Last update: 26 September 2013
Source: Citizen FC
Ordered by squad number.
^{LP}Local player; ^{FP}Foreign player; ^{NR}Non-registered player

=== Transfers ===
==== In ====
#	Position	Player	Transferred from	Fee	Date	Team	Source
14	DF	(Hong Kong) Chan Siu Yuen	(Hong Kong) Biu Chun Rangers	Free transfer	2 June 2013	First team	
5	MF	(Serbia) Marko Krasić	(Indonesia) Arema (IPL)	Undisclosed	15 July 2013	First team	
6	MF	(England) [[]]	(Hong Kong) Kitchee	Free transfer	18 July 2013	First team	
17	DF	(Hong Kong) Mak Ngo Tung	Youth system	N/A	18 July 2013	First team	
24	MF	(Hong Kong) Lau Tak Yan	Youth system	N/A	18 July 2013	First team	
9	FW	(Brazil) Stefan	(Brazil) Jacuipense	Undisclosed	22 July 2013	First team	
20	MF	(Brazil) Fernando Augusto Avezedo Pereira	(Brazil) Jacuipense	Undisclosed	26 September 2013	First team	

==== Out ====
#	Position	Player	Transferred to	Fee	Date	Team	Source
5	MF	(Brazil) Gustavo Claudio da Silva	(Hong Kong) I-Sky Yuen Long	Free transfer (Released)	31 May 2013	First team	
9	FW	(Brazil) Sandro	(Hong Kong) I-Sky Yuen Long	Free transfer (Released)	31 May 2013	First team	
17	GK	(Hong Kong) Liu Fu Yuen	(Hong Kong) I-Sky Yuen Long	Free transfer (Released)	3 June 2013	First team	
11	MF	(Hong Kong) Michael Campion	(Hong Kong) Sun Pegasus	Undisclosed	6 June 2013	First team	
21	FW	(China) Yuan Yang	(Hong Kong) Sun Pegasus	Undisclosed	7 June 2013	First team	
	MF	(Hong Kong) Cheung Yu Sum	(Hong Kong) I-Sky Yuen Long	Free transfer (Released)	16 June 2013	Reserves	
15	DF	(Ghana) Moses Mensah	(Hong Kong) Biu Chun Rangers	Free transfer	14 July 2013	First team	

==== Loan In ====
Squad #	Position	Player	Loaned from	Date	Loan expires	Team	Source

==== Loan out ====
#	Position	Player	Loaned to	Date	Loan expires	Team	Source
28	DF	(Hong Kong) Chiu Chun Kit	(Hong Kong) Yuen Long	3 June 2013	End of the season	First team	

== Squad statistics ==
=== Overall Stats ===
	First Division	Senior Shield	FA Cup	Total Stats
Games played	0	0	0	0
Games won	0	0	0	0
Games drawn	0	0	0	0
Games lost	0	0	0	0
Goals for	0	0	0	0
Goals against	0	0	0	0
Players used	0	0	0	0^{1}
Yellow cards	0	0	0	0
Red cards	0	0	0	0

Last updated: 13 May 2013
Source: Player Stats

Players Used: Citizen have used a total of 0 different players in all competitions.

=== Squad Stats ===
				Total				Hong Kong First Division League		Senior Challenge Shield		FA Cup		
N	Pos.	Name	Nat.	GS	App	Gls	Min	App	Gls	App	Gls	App	Gls	Notes
29	GK	Tse Tak Him	(Hong Kong)											(−) GA
39	GK	Shum Kernick	(Hong Kong)											(−) GA
3	DF	Wong Yiu Fu	(Hong Kong)											
4	DF	Sham Kwok Fai	(Hong Kong)											
12	DF	Ma Ka Ki	(Hong Kong)											
17	DF	Mak Ngo Tung	(Hong Kong)											
23	DF	Hélio	(Brazil)											
25	DF	Yong Ho Wang	(Hong Kong)											
27	DF	Chan Hin Kwong	(Hong Kong)											
5	MF	Marko Krasić	(Serbia)											
6	MF	[[]]	(England)											
7	MF	Festus Baise	(Nigeria)											
8	MF	So Loi Keung	(Hong Kong)											
11	MF	Boris Si	(Hong Kong)											
14	MF	Chan Siu Yuen	(Hong Kong)											
16	MF	Tam Lok Hin	(Hong Kong)											
20	MF	Fernando	(Brazil)											
24	MF	Lau Tak Yan	(Hong Kong)											
31	MF	Okwara Henry Baise	(Ghana)											
9	FW	Stefan Pereira	(Brazil)											
10	FW	Yuto Nakamura	(Japan)											
18	FW	Sham Kwok Keung	(Hong Kong)											
19	FW	Paulinho Piracicaba	(Brazil)											
30	FW	Detinho	(Brazil)											

Last updated: 15 December 2013
Ordered by Position
0 shown as blank

=== Top scorers ===
Place	Position	Nationality	Number	Name	First Division	Senior Shield	FA Cup	Total
TOTALS					0	0	0	0

=== Disciplinary record ===
N	P	Nat.	Name	League			Shield			FA Cup			Total			Notes
N	P	Nat.	Name	Yellow card	Second yellow card	Red card	Yellow card	Second yellow card	Red card	Yellow card	Second yellow card	Red card	Yellow card	Second yellow card	Red card	Notes

Last updated: 15 December 2013
Source: Competitive matches
Ordered by (red card) , (second yellow card) and (yellow card)
(yellow card) = Number of bookings; (second yellow card) = Number of sending offs after a second yellow card; (red card) = Number of sending offs by a direct red card.

=== Substitution Record ===
Includes all competitive matches.

			League		Shield		FA Cup		Total	
No.	Pos	Name	subson	subsoff	subson	subsoff	subson	subsoff	subson	subsoff
Goalkeepers
29	GK	Tse Tak Him	0	0	0	0	0	0	0	0
39	GK	Shum Kernick	0	0	0	0	0	0	0	0
Defenders
3	DF	Wong Yiu Fu	0	0	0	0	0	0	0	0
4	DF	Shum Kwok Fai	0	0	0	0	0	0	0	0
12	DF	Ma Ka Ki	0	0	0	0	0	0	0	0
17	DF	Mak Ngo Tung	0	0	0	0	0	0	0	0
23	DF	Hélio	0	0	0	0	0	0	0	0
25	DF	Young Ho Wang	0	0	0	0	0	0	0	0
27	DF	Chan Hin Kwong	0	0	0	0	0	0	0	0
Midfielders
5	MF	Marko Krasić	0	0	0	0	0	0	0	0
6	MF	[[]]	0	0	0	0	0	0	0	0
7	MF	Festus Baise	0	0	0	0	0	0	0	0
8	MF	So Loi Keung	0	0	0	0	0	0	0	0
11	MF	Boris Si	0	0	0	0	0	0	0	0
14	MF	Chan Siu Yuen	0	0	0	0	0	0	0	0
16	MF	Tam Lok Hin	0	0	0	0	0	0	0	0
20	MF	Fernando	0	0	0	0	0	0	0	0
24	MF	Lau Tak Yan	0	0	0	0	0	0	0	0
31	MF	Okwara Henry Baise	0	0	0	0	0	0	0	0
Forwards
9	FW	Stefan	0	0	0	0	0	0	0	0
10	FW	Yuto Nakamura	0	0	0	0	0	0	0	0
18	FW	Sham Kwok Keung	0	0	0	0	0	0	0	0
19	FW	Paulinho Piracicaba	0	0	0	0	0	0	0	0
30	FW	Detinho	0	0	0	0	0	0	0	0

Last updated: 15 December 2013

=== Captains ===
No.	P	Name	Country	No. games	Notes

Last updated: (Once the season commences)
Source: Competitive match reports.
Competitive matches only
Matches started as captain only
Country: FIFA nationality; No.: Squad number; P: Position; Name: Player name; No. Games: Number of games started as captain.

== Competitions ==
=== Overall ===
Competition	Started round	Current position / round	Final position / round	First match	Last match
Hong Kong First Division League	—	6th		1 September 2013	
Senior Challenge Shield	Quarter-finals	—		October 2013	
FA Cup	Quarter-finals	—		January 2014	

Updated to match played 15 December 2013
Source: Competitions

=== First Division League ===
==== Classification ====
Pos	Team	Pld	W	D	L	GF	GA	GD	Pts	Qualification or relegation
7	I-Sky Yuen Long	18	5	5	8	25	33	−8	20	
8	Sunray Cave JC Sun Hei (R)	18	5	4	9	32	41	−9	19	Relegation to 2014–15 Hong Kong First Division League (Note: Sunray Cave JC Sun Hei & Citizen declined to participate in the 2014–15 Hong Kong Premier League and would self-relegate in the following season.)
9	Citizen (R)	18	4	6	8	25	33	−8	18	Relegation to 2014–15 Hong Kong First Division League
10	Yokohama FC Hong Kong	18	3	4	11	25	39	−14	13	
11	Happy Valley (D, R)	0	0	0	0	0	0	0	0	Excluded, record expunged Relegation to 2014–15 Hong Kong First Division League (Note: On 13 February 2014, the HKFA announced that as a result of a match-fixing investigation, both Tuen Mun and Happy Valley would be excluded from the league, and their records would be expunged.)

Updated to match(es) played on 11 May 2014. Source: Hong Kong Football Association
Rules for classification: 1) points; 2) head-to-head points; 3) head-to-head goal difference; 4) head-to-head goals scored; 5) goal difference; 6) number of goals scored.
(D) Disqualified; (R) Relegated

==== Results summary ====
Overall								Home						Away					
Pld	W	D	L	GF	GA	GD	Pts	W	D	L	GF	GA	GD	W	D	L	GF	GA	GD
9	3	4	2	14	12	+2	13	2	2	1	7	6	+1	1	2	1	7	6	+1

Last updated: 15 December 2013.
Source: First Division

==== Results by round ====
Round	1	2	3	4	5	6	7	8	9	10	11	12	13	14	15	16	17	18	19	20	21	22
Ground	H	A	A	A	H	A	H	H	H	A	H	A	A	H	A	H	A	A	A	H	H	H
Result	D	D	D	L	D	W	W	W	L													
Position	8	8	8	8	7	5	5															

Updated to match(es) played on 15 December 2013. Source: Competitive Matches
A = Away; H = Home; W = Win; D = Draw; L = Loss

== Matches ==
Win Draw Loss Void

=== Pre-season friendlies ===
2 August 2013	Yuen Long (Hong Kong)	1 – 1	(Hong Kong) Citizen	Tsing Yi, New Territories
16:30 UTC+8	Cheung Chi Yung		Hélio	Stadium: Tsing Yi Northeast Park

9 August 2013	Citizen (Hong Kong)	2 – 1	(China) Guangdong Sunray Cave B	Guangzhou, China PR
	Stefan			Stadium: Sanshui Football Training Base

11 August 2013	Tuen Mun (China)	1 – 2	(Hong Kong) Citizen	Guangzhou, China PR
				Stadium: Sanshui Football Training Base

August 2013	Yokohama FC Hong Kong	v	(Hong Kong) Citizen	Guangzhou, China PR
TBA				Stadium: Sanshui Football Training Base

=== First Division League ===
1 September 2013 Round 1	Citizen	1 – 1	Yokohama FC Hong Kong	Tsing Yi, New Territories
14:30 UTC+8	Stefan 53'; Krasić (yellow card) 53'; Sham Kwok Fai (yellow card) 66'	Report	(yellow card) 50' Chan Chun Lok; (yellow card) 58' (yellow-red card) 74' Park Tae-Hong; 81' Fukuda	Stadium: Tsing Yi Sports Ground (Capacity: 1,500); Attendance: 472; Referee: Ng Kai Lam; Assistant referees: Chow Chun Kit, Luk Kin Sun; Fourth official: Liu Kwok Man

14 September 2013 Round 2	Sunray Cave JC Sun Hei	1 – 1	Citizen	Tsing Yi, New Territories
14:30 UTC+8	Reinaldo 9'; Lugo (yellow card) 28'	Report	(yellow card) 42' Festus; 56' Sham Kwok Keung	Stadium: Tsing Yi Sports Ground (Capacity: 1,500); Attendance: 309; Referee: Ng Chiu Kok; Assistant referees: Cheng Oi Cho, Yau Ho Fai; Fourth official: Yu Kin Fung

21 September 2013 Round 3	Royal Southern	1 – 1	Citizen	Mong Kok, Kowloon
14:30 UTC+8	Yago 34'; Chung Hon Chee (yellow card) 80'	Report	(yellow card) 19' Krasić; 36' Detinho; (yellow card) 54' Chan Hin Kwong	Stadium: Mong Kok Stadium (Note: Due to bad pitch condition, the match will be played at Mong Kok Stadium instead of Southern's home ground Aberdeen Sports Ground.) (Capacity: 6,680); Attendance: 544; Referee: Ho Wai Sing; Assistant referees: Lui Siu Chuen, Tang Hing Fu; Fourth official: Luk Kin Sun

29 September 2013 Round 4	Kitchee	3 − 1	Citizen	Mong Kok, Kowloon
14:30 UTC+8	Alex 15', 75'; Lam Ka Wai 45+4'	Report	(yellow card) 24' Chan Hin Kwong; (yellow card) 29' Sham Kwok Keung; (yellow card) 78' So Loi Keung; 85' Nakamura	Stadium: Mong Kok Stadium (Capacity: 6,680); Attendance: 1,250; Referee: Cheng Oi Cho; Assistant referees: Lui Siu Chuen, Yau Ho Fai; Fourth official: Fok Pong Shing

6 October 2013 Round 5	Citizen	1 – 1	Eastern Salon	Tsing Yi, New Territories
17:30 UTC+8	Nakamura (yellow card) 31'; Paulinho 52'; Tam Lok Hin (yellow card) 84'	Report	38' Cheng Siu Wai; (yellow card) 50' Diego; (yellow card) 79' Tse Man Wing	Stadium: Tsing Yi Sports Ground (Capacity: 1,500); Attendance: 648; Referee: Luk Kin Sun; Assistant referees: Lam Nai Kei, Yau Ho Fai; Fourth official: Ho Wai Sing

19 October 2013 Round 6	Tuen Mun	1 – 4 (Voided)	Citizen	Tuen Mun, New Territories
14:30 UTC+8	Siu Leong (yellow card) 68'; Law Ka Lok (yellow card) 77'; Madjo 78'	Report	41' Sham Kwok Keung; 57' Nakamura; 69' (pen.) Krasić; 73' Fernando	Stadium: Tuen Mun Tang Shiu Kin Sports Ground (Capacity: 2,200); Attendance: 462; Referee: Lui Siu Chuen; Assistant referees: Chan Shiu Hung, Tang Hing Fu; Fourth official: Yu Chun Sun

26 October 2013 Round 7	Citizen	3 – 2 (Voided)	Happy Valley	Tsing Yi, New Territories
14:30 UTC+8	Nakamura 17', 79'; Paulinho 34'; Chan Hin Kwong (yellow card) 45+1'; Krasić (yellow card) 77'	Report	(yellow card) 15' Li Chun Yip; (yellow card) 23' Mus; (yellow card) 50' Bamnjo; (yellow card) 55' (red card) 63' Fan Weijun; (yellow card) 64' Akosah; 73', 90+4' Abalsamo	Stadium: Tsing Yi Sports Ground (Capacity: 1,500); Attendance: 223; Referee: Ng Chiu Kok; Assistant referees: Chan Shui Hung, Yau Tsz Yeung; Fourth official: Wong Yin Wai

30 November 2013 Round 8	Citizen	2 – 1	I-Sky Yuen Long	Tsing Yi, New Territories
17:30 UTC+8	Stefan 42'; Detinho 84'	Report	89' Cheung Chi Kin; (yellow card) 90+3' Lau Ka Ming	Stadium: Tsing Yi Sports Ground (Capacity: 1,500); Attendance: 313; Referee: Lau Fong Hei; Assistant referees: Yu Chun Sun, Tang Hing Fu; Fourth official: Cheng Oi Cho

15 December 2013 Round 9	Citizen	0 – 1	Biu Chun Rangers	Tsing Yi, New Territories
14:30 UTC+8	Wong Yiu Fu (yellow card) 45'; Festus (yellow card) 51'	Report	(yellow card) 30' (yellow-red card) 86' Schutz; (yellow card) 43' Miroslav; (yellow card) 70' Law Hiu Chung; 73' Chuck Yiu Kwok	Stadium: Tsing Yi Sports Ground (Capacity: 1,500); Attendance: 218; Referee: Ng Kai Lam; Assistant referees: Yau Ho Fai, Fok Pong Shing; Fourth official: Chan Shui Hung

4 January 2014 Round 10	Sun Pegasus	0 – 1	Citizen	Mong Kok, Kowloon
17:30 UTC+8	Ranđelović (yellow card) 69'	Report	14' Stefan; (yellow card) 82' Nakamura; (yellow card) 90+8' Chan Hin Kwong	Stadium: Mong Kok Stadium (Capacity: 6,680); Attendance: 1,256; Referee: Tong Kui Sum; Assistant referees: Chow Chun Kit, Lam Nai Kei; Fourth official: Leung Chung Yin

18 January 2014 Round 11	Citizen	1 - 4	South China	Tsing Yi, New Territories
17:30 UTC+8	Nakamura 25'	Report	(yellow card) 75' Sealy; 81' Lee Hong Lim; 82' Lee Chi Ho; 85' Weiji; 87' Kwok Kin Pong	Stadium: Tsing Yi Sports Ground (Capacity: 1,500); Attendance: 2,090; Referee: Tong Kui Sum; Assistant referees: Chan Shui Hung, Tang Hing Fu; Fourth official: Yu Kin Fung

8 February 2014 Round 12	South China	Postponed	Citizen	So Kon Po, Hong Kong Island
17:30 UTC+8				Stadium: Hong Kong Stadium (Capacity: 40,000)

15 February 2014 Round 13	Happy Valley	Cancelled	Citizen	Kowloon Bay, Kowloon
14:30 UTC+8				Stadium: Kowloon Bay Park (Note: The match will be played at Kowloon Bay Park instead of Happy Valley's home ground Siu Sai Wan Sports Ground and Tai Po Sports Ground.) (Capacity: 1,200)

22 February 2014 Round 14	Citizen	3 – 4	Sunray Cave JC Sun Hei	Tsing Yi, Kowloon
14:30 UTC+8	Festus (yellow card) 21' (yellow-red card) 51'; Boris Si 29'; Krasić 53'; Chan Hin Kwong (yellow card) 60'; Nakamura (yellow card) 78'; Hélio 90+7'	Report	35', 51' (pen.) Lugo; 46', 70' Bouet; (yellow card) 58' Zhang Jun; (yellow card) 86' Wong Chun Ho	Stadium: Tsing Yi Sports Ground (Capacity: 1,500); Attendance: 142; Referee: Ho Wai Sing; Assistant referees: Luk Kin Sun, Tang Hing Fu; Fourth official: Law Ming Leong

8 March 2014 Round 15	Eastern Salon	2 – 2	Citizen	Mong Kok, Kowloon
14:30 UTC+8	Tse Man Wing 24'; Diego (yellow card) 29'; Li Haiqiang (yellow card) 32'; Macallister (yellow card) 45+5'; Clayton (yellow card) 45+5'; Yiu Hok Man (yellow card) 52'; Giovane 61'	Report	28' Hélio; 40' Paulinho; 45+3' (yellow card) 45+5' Stefan; (yellow card) 45+5' Krasić; (yellow card) 57' Sham Kwok Fai; (yellow card) 69' Tam Lok Hin; (yellow card) 90+2' So Loi Keung	Stadium: Mong Kok Stadium (Note: The match will be played at Mong Kok Stadium instead of Eastern Salon's home ground Shing Mun Valley Sports Ground.) (Capacity: 6,680); Attendance: 1,152; Referee: Tong Kui Sum; Assistant referees: Lau Fong Hei, Lam Nai Kei; Fourth official: Law Bik Chi

16 March 2014 Round 16	Citizen	0 – 2	Kitchee	Tsing Yi, New Territories
17:30 UTC+8	Chan Hin Kwong (yellow card) 21'	Report	12' Cascón; 36' Annan; (yellow card) 57' Dani	Stadium: Tsing Yi Sports Ground (Capacity: 1,500); Attendance: 445; Referee: Tong Kui Sum; Assistant referees: Yu Chun Sun, Fok Pong Shing; Fourth official: Ho Wai Sing

23 March 2014 Round 17	Biu Chun Rangers	2 – 2	Citizen	Sham Shui Po, Kowloon
14:30 UTC+8	Chuck Yiu Kwok 3'; Schutz (yellow card) 7' (goal) 24'	Report	58' Detinho; 69' Festus	Stadium: Sham Shui Po Sports Ground (Capacity: 2,194); Attendance: 471; Referee: Ng Kai Lam; Assistant referees: Lau Fong Hei, Ng Wai Hong; Fourth official: Lo Yuk Ming

30 March 2014 Round 18	I-Sky Yuen Long	2 – 1	Citizen	Yuen Long, New Territories
17:30 UTC+8	Souza 3', 30'; Yan Wai Hong (yellow card) 50' (yellow-red card) 84'; Gustavo (yellow card) 82'	Report	(yellow card) 28' Sham Kwok Keung; (yellow card) 74' Stefan; 90' Fernando	Stadium: Yuen Long Stadium (Capacity: 4,932); Attendance: 680; Referee: Cheng Oi Cho; Assistant referees: Lui Siu Chuen, Fok Pong Shing; Fourth official: Lo Ka Fai

6 April 2014 Round 19	Yokohama FC Hong Kong	3 – 2	Citizen	Tseung Kwan O, New Territories
14:30 UTC+8	Tan Chun Lok (yellow card) 18'; Wong Wai (yellow card) 24'; Fukuda 40'; Leung Nok Hang 46'; Yoshitake (yellow card) 57'; Park Tae-Hong (yellow card) 68'; Tse Tak Him 78' (o.g.)	Report	(yellow card) 18' Festus; 57' Stefan; (yellow card) 61' Tam Lok Hin; 85' Makamura	Stadium: Tseung Kwan O Sports Ground (Capacity: 3,500); Attendance: 457; Referee: Lau Fong Hei; Assistant referees: Chow Chun Kit, Chan Shing Kin; Fourth official: Ng Chiu Kok

20 April 2014 Round 20	Citizen	2 – 1	Royal Southern	Tsing Yi, New Territories
14:30 UTC+8	Festus 66' (pen.); Detinho 76'; Tam Lok Hin (yellow card) 78'	Report	(yellow card) 15' Lee Sze Ho; 22' Dieguito; (red card) 65' Rubén; (yellow card) 74' James Ha	Stadium: Tsing Yi Sports Ground (Capacity: 1,500); Attendance: 305; Referee: Ho Wai Sing; Assistant referees: Yu Chun Sun, Mok Ka Ming; Fourth official: Liu Kwok Man

4 May 2014 Round 21	Citizen	v	Sun Pegasus	Tsing Yi, New Territories
17:30 UTC+8				Stadium: Tsing Yi Sports Ground (Capacity: 1,500)

10–11 May 2014 Round 22	Citizen	Cancelled	Tuen Mun	Tsing Yi, New Territories
TBC				Stadium: Tsing Yi Sports Ground (Capacity: 1,500)

=== Senior Shield ===
8 December 2013 Quarter-finals	Citizen	3 - 3 (a.e.t.) (2 - 4 p)	Eastern Salon	Tseung Kwan O, New Territories
14:30 UTC+8	Chan Hin Kwong (yellow card) 18'; Fernando (yellow card) 25'; Sham Kwok Fai 33'; Nakamura (yellow card) 49' (yellow-red card); Sham Kwok Keung 59', 93'; Hélio (yellow card) 72' (yellow-red card)	Summary	Clayton (yellow card) 22'; Lau Nim Yat (yellow card) 45+1' (red card) 49'; Diego Eli Moreira (yellow card) 50'; Yiu Hok Man (yellow card) 51'; Beto (yellow card) 52' (goal) 58'; Giovane 61', 68'; Tse Man Wing (yellow card) 92'; Leung Kwok Wai (yellow card) 96'	Stadium: Tseung Kwan O Sports Ground (Capacity: 6,680); Attendance: 471
