= Darko Božović =

Montenegrin footballer (1978–2026)

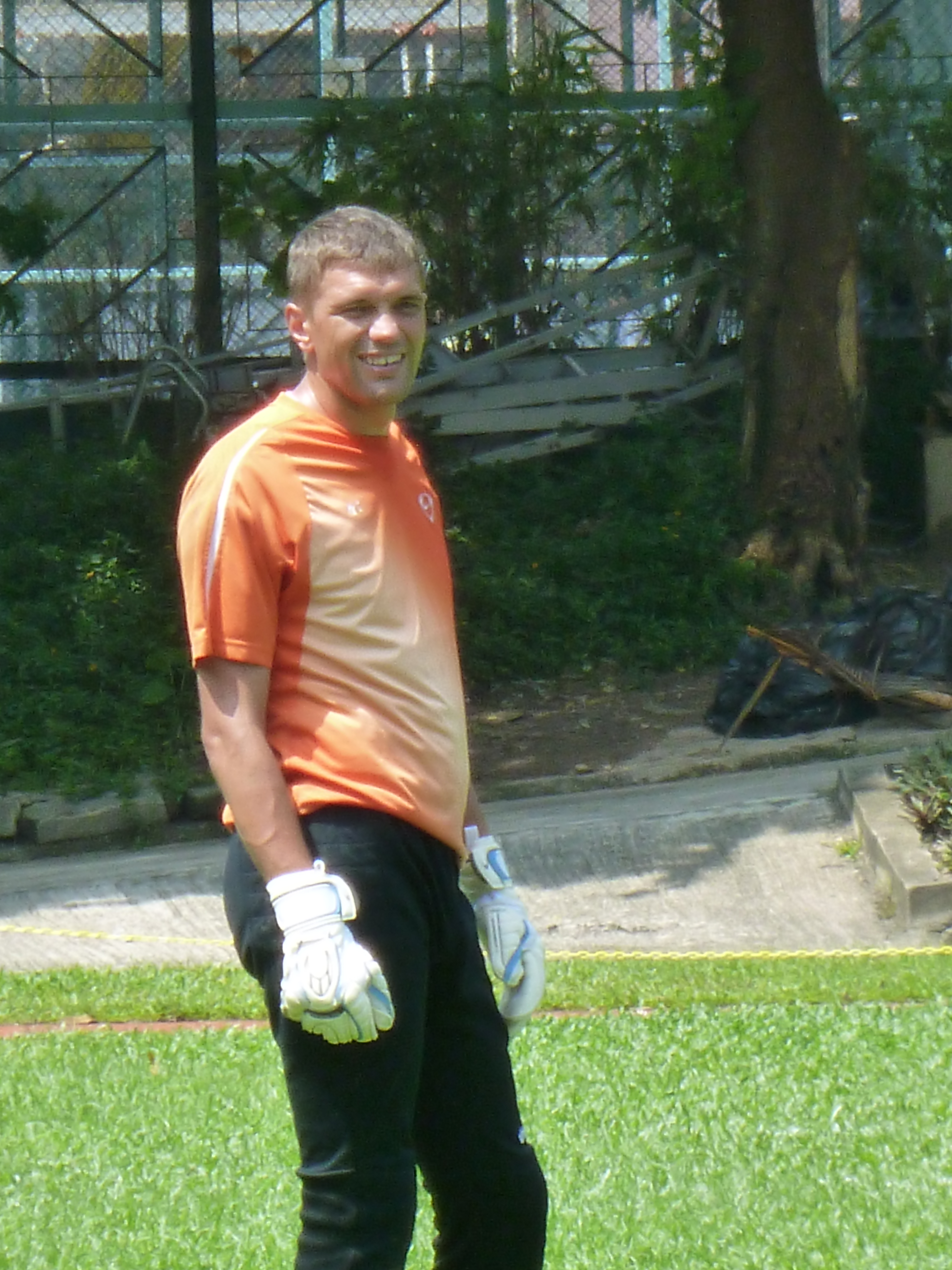
- Božović in 2013

Personal information
- Date of birth: 9 August 1978
- Place of birth: Titograd, SR Montenegro, SFR Yugoslavia
- Date of death: 25 October 2026 (aged 48)
- Height: 1.89 m (6 ft 2 in)
- Position: Goalkeeper

Senior career*
Years	Team	Apps	(Gls)
1996–1997	Teleoptik	3	(0)
1997–2000	Srem Jakovo	56	(0)
2000–2002	Mladenovac	63	(0)
2002–2004	Timok	49	(0)
2004–2005	Srem	55	(0)
2005–2007	Bežanija	68	(1)
2007–2010	Partizan	24	(0)
2011–2012	Sloboda Užice	41	(0)
2012	Zob Ahan	7	(0)
2013	Bežanija	15	(0)
2013–2014	Happy Valley	8	(0)
2014–2015	Voždovac	2	(0)
Total		391	(1)

International career
2007	Montenegro	2	(0)
- * Club domestic league appearances and goals

Darko Božović (Cyrillic: Дарко Божовић; 9 August 1978 – 25 October 2026) was a Montenegrin footballer who played as a goalkeeper.

== Club career ==
On 28 October 2006, while playing for Bežanija, Božović scored an equaliser in their home league fixture against Voždovac. Firstly, on the 0–1 result, he defended a penalty by Miloš Kolaković in the 88th minute, and then, in the fourth minute of injury time, he scored a header from a corner kick for the final 1–1.

In June 2007, Božović moved to Partizan, playing regularly for the team in the first six months. However, he lost his place in the starting eleven in the second half of the 2007–08 season to his fellow countryman Mladen Božović, who arrived at the club in the 2008 winter transfer window. In the summer of 2010, Božović was released by the club after receiving very little playing time in the previous two years.

In August 2013, Božović joined Hong Kong First Division side Happy Valley. On 5 January 2014, he was one of the seven players and coaching staff arrested by the Hong Kong Independent Commission Against Corruption (ICAC) for allegations with match-fixing. On 6 January 2014, the homes of Božović and five other Happy Valley players were raided by the ICAC as the officials stepped up their investigation into alleged match-fixing. Božović was later released without charge, although his teammates Hinson Leung and Saša Mus were jailed for 12 months for match-fixing in 2014. On 26 March 2014, Božović and other Happy Valley players went to the Hong Kong Labour Department to make claims against Happy Valley for unpaid and outstanding wages worth around 100,000 Hong Kong dollars.

After leaving Happy Valley in Hong Kong, Božović returned to Serbia and joined Superlige-side FK Voždovac in July 2014.

== International career ==
Božović made his debut for Montenegro in a September 2007 friendly match against Sweden and has earned a total of two caps, scoring no goals. His second and final international was another friendly, a month later against Estonia.

== Death ==
Božović died on 25 October 2026, aged 48.

== Honours ==
Bežanija

- Serbian First League: 2005–06

Partizan

- Serbian SuperLiga: 2007–08, 2008–09, 2009–10
- Serbian Cup: 2007–08, 2008–09
