= Pablo Leguizamón Arce =

Paraguayan-Argentine footballer (born 1982)

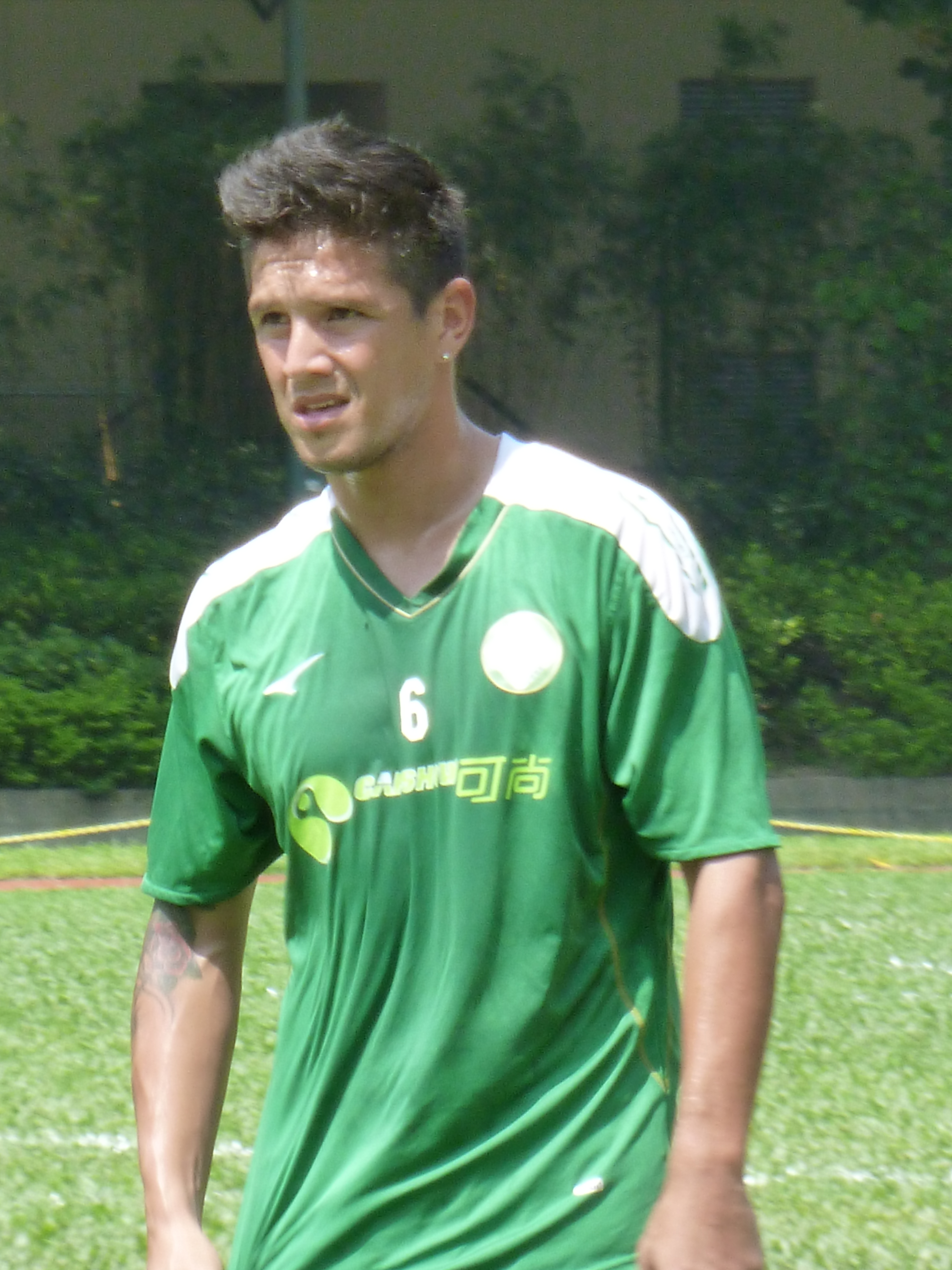
- Leguizamón Arce in 2013

Personal information
- Full name: Pablo César Leguizamón Arce
- Date of birth: 5 October 1982 (age 44)
- Place of birth: Asunción, Paraguay
- Height: 1.85 m (6 ft 1 in)
- Position: Defender

Youth career
- 1999–2000: Sol de América
- 2000–2001: San Telmo

Senior career*
| Years | Team | Apps | (Gls) |
| 2001–2008 | San Telmo | 37 | |
| 2004 | → Nueva Chicago (loan) | 10 | (0) |
| 2005–2006 | → Huracán (loan) | 8 | (0) |
| 2008–2009 | Villa Mitre de Bahía Blanca | 23 | (2) |
| 2009–2010 | Colegiales | 16 | (1) |
| 2010–2011 | Atlético Tucumán | 4 | (0) |
| 2011–2013 | Colegiales | 12 | |
| 2013 | → Happy Valley (loan). | 8 | (0) |
| 2014–2016 | Barracas Central | 51 | (0) |
| 2016–2017 | Gimnasia y Esgrima | 22 | (0) |
| 2017 | CA Huracán | 7 | (0) |
| 2019–2020 | Hong Kong Rangers | 8 | (0) |
- * Club domestic league appearances and goals as of 14 October 2020

Pablo Leguizamón Arce (born 5 October 1982) is a Paraguayan-born naturalised Argentine former professional footballer. In 2013, Argentine newspaper Clarín named him a historic defender from Argentina's lower divisions.

== Career ==
=== Early career ===
Leguizamón Arce was born in Asunción, Paraguay. His first steps in football were at Paraguayan club Sol de América.

=== San Telmo ===
He joined San Telmo in 2000. He was promoted to the first team in 2001 and spent 8 years with the club. In these eight years, Leguizamón Arce joined Nueva Chicago and Huracán on loan respectively.

==== Huracán (loan) ====
In Huracan's squad in 2006, Leguizamon teamed with Pablo Migliore, Leandro Grimi, Nicolas Sartori, Mauricio Jofre, Cristian Sanchez Prette, Martin Zapata, Walter Coyette, Esteban Vizcarra, Federico Poggi, Juan Sara, Joaquin Larrivey and Japanese player Yusuke Kato.

Between 2001 and 2008, Leguizamon amassed 136 league appearances for San Telmo in Argentina's B Nacional.

=== Villa Mitre ===
He left San Telmo and joined Villa Mitre de Bahía Blanca in 2008 but left the club and joined Colegiales in 2009.

=== Colegiales ===
After spending a season with Colegiales, he joined Atlético Tucumán on a free transfer in 2010, but rejoined Colegiales in 2011.

He appeared in 121 league games for Colegiales between 2009 and 2014.

=== Happy Valley ===
After spending 13 years in Argentina, Leguizamón Arce joined Hong Kong First Division League side Happy Valley in July 2013 and left in January 2014. Leguizamon incorporated to Happy Valley's team after its Argentine coach Sergio Timoner contacted him in March to play with the club. Leguizamon colleagued with Argentines Mauro Beltramella and Jonathan Acosta.

=== Gimnasia ===
In August 2016, Leguizamon joined Gimnasia upon request from Dario Alaniz.

=== Rangers ===
On 30 July 2019, Leguizamón Arce returned to Hong Kong and joined Hong Kong Premier League club Rangers.
