= Lau Tak Yan =

Hong Kong footballer

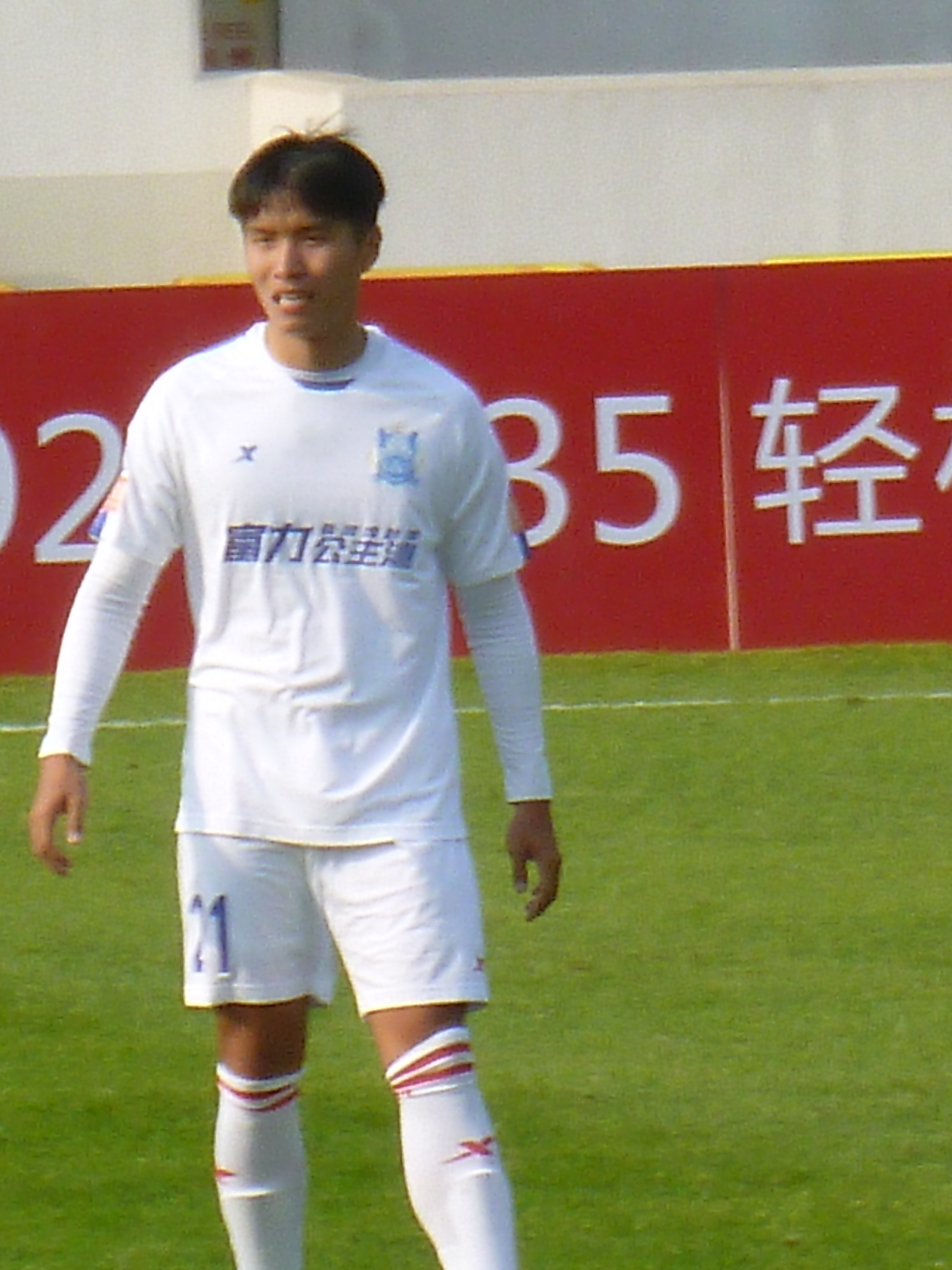

Personal information
- Full name: Lau Tak Yan
- Date of birth: 1 June 1994 (age 32)
- Place of birth: Hong Kong
- Height: 1.73 m (5 ft 8 in)
- Position: Midfielder

Youth career
- 2008–2009: Kitchee
- 2009–2013: Rangers

Senior career*
Years	Team	Apps	(Gls)
2013–2014	Citizen	0	(0)
2015–2016	Central & Western	28	(14)
2016–2017	R&F	0	(0)
2017–2018	Dreams	0	(0)
2018–2019	Hoi King	1	(0)
2019–2020	Yuen Long	0	(0)
2020–2023	Central & Western	4	(1)

International career
2009	Hong Kong U-16	1	(0)
- * Club domestic league appearances and goals

Lau Tak Yan (Chinese: 劉德仁, born 1 June 1994) is a former Hong Kong professional footballer.

== Club career ==
In 2013, Lau joined then Hong Kong First Division club Citizen but was released after one season when the club decided against applying for a club license in the newly formed, fully professional Hong Kong Premier League.

After a year away from football, he joined Central & Western after being recruited by their manager Fung Chung Ting. He led the club in assists during his season at Central & Western.

In August 2016, Lau went on trial with newly formed HKPL club R&F. After a week of training, he was signed to a contract.

In July 2017, Dreams announced that they had signed Lau ahead of the 2017-18 season. He made his debut for his club in a 2017-18 Senior Shield match against Rangers.

On 24 July 2018, Lau was announced as a player for newly promoted side Hoi King.

On 10 August 2019, it was announced that Lau would join another Hong Kong Premier League club Yuen Long.

== International career ==
In 2009, Lau was selected to the Hong Kong U-16 squad which participated in the 2010 AFC U-16 Championship qualification tournament in China from 19 September to 2 October 2009. On March 28, 2013, he was called up to the Hong Kong U-20 squad and will participate in the 2013 National Games of China football preliminaries from April 2 to April 11, 2013, in Shanghai.
