= Boris Si =

Canadian professional soccer player (born 1994)

Personal information
- Full name: Boris Chiho Si
- Date of birth: 27 July 1994 (age 32)
- Place of birth: Vancouver, British Columbia, Canada
- Height: 1.70 m (5 ft 7 in)
- Position: Midfielder

Team information
- Current team: CCB LFC United

Youth career
- Coquitlam Metro Ford
- –2012: Fusion FC

College career
Years	Team	Apps	(Gls)
2014–2015	UBC Thunderbirds	26	(2)

Senior career*
Years	Team	Apps	(Gls)
2012–2014	Citizen AA	20	(1)
2019–	CCB LFC United		
- * Club domestic league appearances and goals as of 22:47, 9 December 2021 (UTC)

Boris Chiho Si (Chinese: 施志浩; born 27 July 1994) is a Canadian professional soccer player.

== College career ==
Si moved back to Canada in 2014, enrolling at the University of British Columbia. He played in 16 games in his first season and 10 in his second, scoring one goal in each.

== Club career ==
Having played soccer locally with Coquitlam Metro Ford and Fusion FC, Si moved to Hong Kong in 2012, and spent two seasons in the Hong Kong First Division League (now the Hong Kong Premier League) with The Citizen Athletic Association.

In 2019, Si joined local Canadian side CCB LFC United.

== Career statistics ==
=== Club ===
As of 22 January 2020.

Club	Season	League			National Cup		League Cup		Continental		Other		Total	
Club	Season	Division	Apps	Goals	Apps	Goals	Apps	Goals	Apps	Goals	Apps	Goals	Apps	Goals
Citizen AA	2012–13	First Division	7	0	1 (Note: Appearances in the Hong Kong FA Cup)	0	0	0	0	0	2 (Note: Appearances in the Senior Shield)	1	10	1
Citizen AA	2013–14	First Division	13	1	1	0	0	0	0	0	0	0	14	1
Career total			20	1	2	0	0	0	0	0	2	1	24	2
