= Lau Ka Shing =

Hong Kong footballer (born 1989)

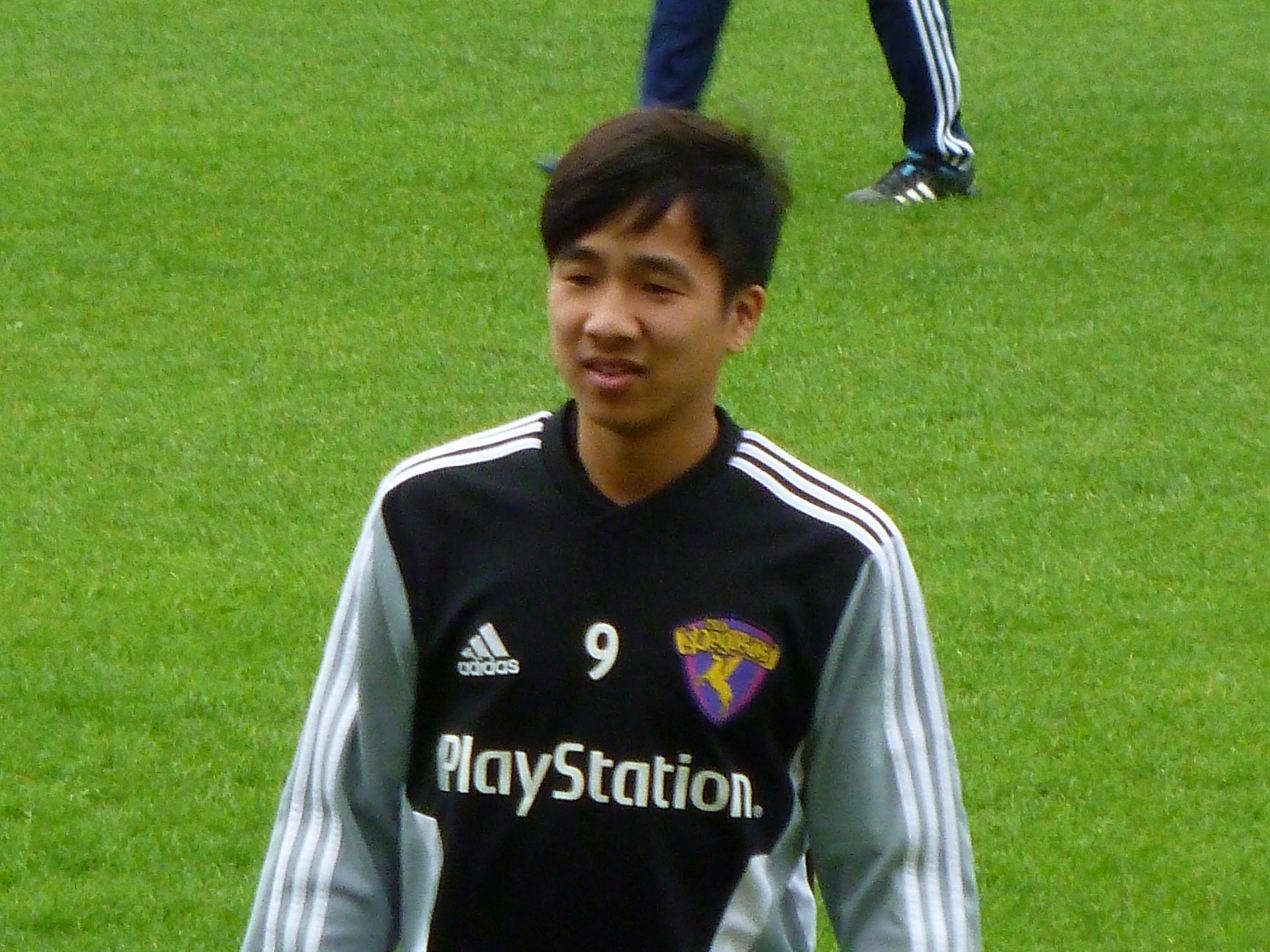

Personal information
- Full name: Lau Ka Shing
- Date of birth: 13 August 1989 (age 37)
- Place of birth: Hong Kong
- Height: 1.70 m (5 ft 7 in)
- Position: Forward

Senior career*
Years	Team	Apps	(Gls)
2007–2008	Hong Kong Rangers	2	(0)
2008–2010	Fourway Rangers	28	(2)
2010	Hong Kong Rangers	9	(4)
2010–2014	Happy Valley	28	(20)
2011	→ Lam Pak (loan)		
2011–2012	→ Pegasus (loan)	9	(1)
2014–2015	Yau Tsim Mong	8	(3)
2015	Double Flower	3	(1)
2017–2020	North District	15	(3)
2020	Icanfield	1	(0)
2020–2021	Double Flower	3	(1)
2022–2023	Tsun Tat		
- * Club domestic league appearances and goals

Lau Ka Shing (Chinese: 劉嘉城; Jyutping: lau^{4} gaa^{1} sing^{4}, born 13 August 1989) is a Hong Kong former professional footballer who played as a forward.
