= Leonardo Abálsamo =

Argentine footballer

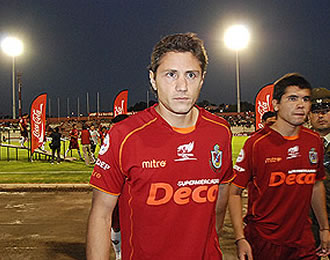

Personal information
- Full name: Leonardo Abálsamo
- Date of birth: 5 October 1982 (age 44)
- Place of birth: Buenos Aires, Argentina
- Height: 1.86 m (6 ft 1 in)
- Position: Forward

Senior career*
Years	Team	Apps	(Gls)
2001–2002	Almagro	10	(1)
2002–2003	Independiente Rivadavia	23	(9)
2003	Santiago Morning	?	(1)
2003–2004	Luján de Cuyo	?	(9)
2004	Universidad	?	(0)
2004–2007	San Martín de Mendoza	56	(13)
2007	Luján de Cuyo		
2007–2008	Sportivo Italiano	?	(23)
2008–2009	Correcaminos UAT	10	(0)
2009	Deportes La Serena	7	(3)
2009–2010	Platense	11	(2)
2010	Sportivo Italiano	5	(0)
2010–2011	Deportivo Maipú	8	(1)
2011	Alumni de Villa María	17	(7)
2011–2012	Deportivo Santamarina	31	(11)
2013–2014	Sportivo Peñarol	12	(3)
2013	→ Happy Valley (loan)	8	(2)
- * Club domestic league appearances and goals

Leonardo Abálsamo (born 3 June 1984) is a retired Argentine footballer.

He previously played for Club de Deportes La Serena in Chile, where he scored 3 goals in 7 matches, and Correcaminos UAT in the Mexican Primera A.
