= Li Chun Yip =

Hong Kong footballer (born 1981)

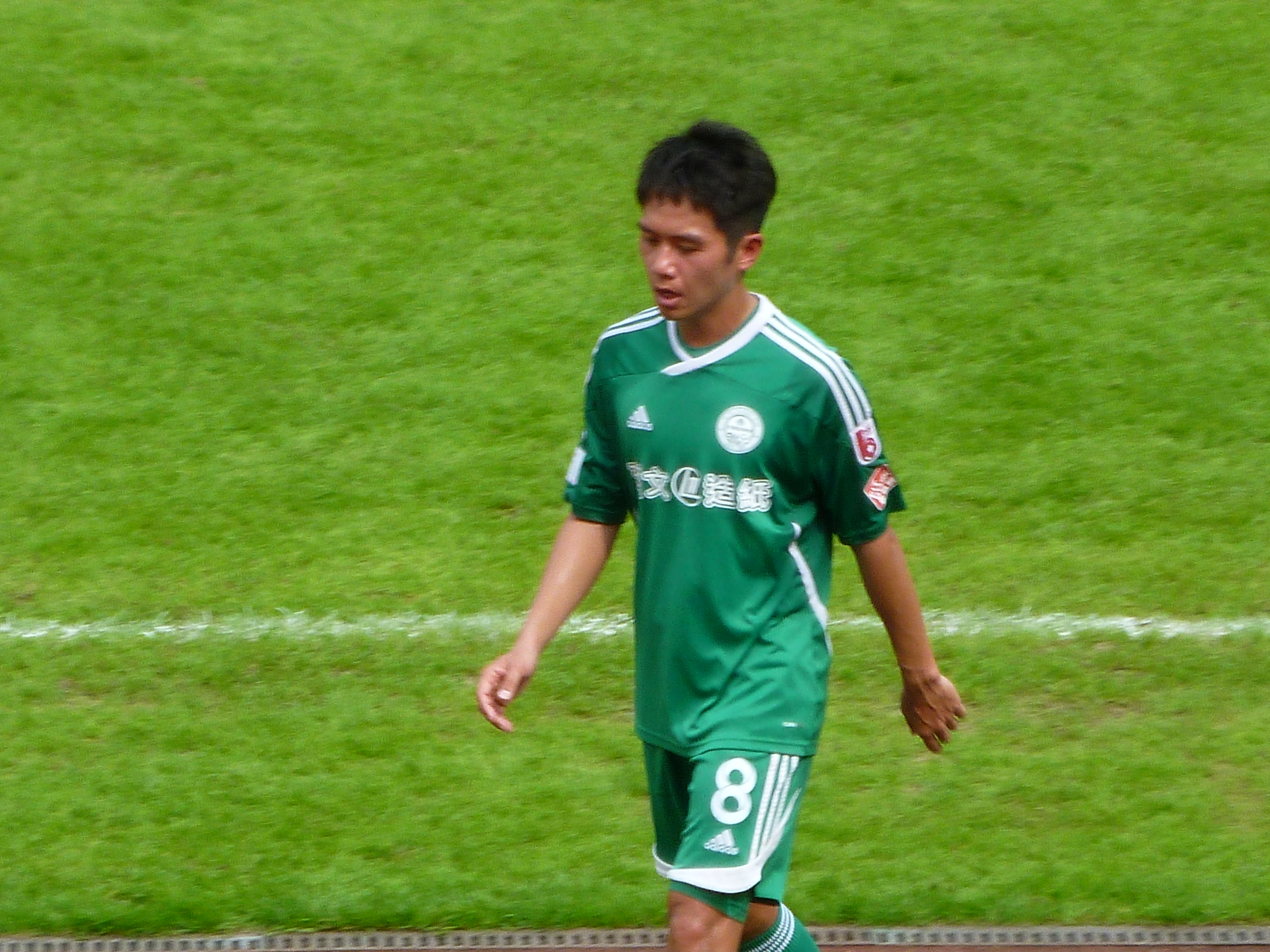

Personal information
- Full name: Li Chun Yip
- Date of birth: 18 September 1981 (age 45)
- Place of birth: Hong Kong
- Height: 1.75 m (5 ft 9 in)
- Position: Midfielder

Youth career
- –1998: Hong Kong Rangers

Senior career*
Years	Team	Apps	(Gls)
1998–2000	Hong Kong Rangers	1	(1)
2000–2001	Instant-Dict FC		
2001–2006	Happy Valley	30	(0)
2006–2007	Citizen	12	(2)
2007–2009	Telecom		(28)
2009–2010	Happy Valley	15	(2)
2010–2012	Tai Po	14	(5)
2012–2014	Happy Valley	25	(8)
2014–2025	Wing Yee	173	(32)

International career^{‡}
2001–2003	Hong Kong U-23		
- * Club domestic league appearances and goals as of 9 August 2011 ‡ National team caps and goals as of 9 August 2011

Li Chun Yip (Chinese: 李圳業) is a Hong Kong former professional footballer who played as a midfielder.

== Club career ==
=== Early career ===
Li played his first league match for Rangers. He was a member of the Hong Kong national under-23 football team. Subsequently, he moved to Instant-Dict.

After Instant-Dict was disbanded, Li joined Happy Valley. In 2004, he was also called up for the Hong Kong national football team.

In 2006, he moved to Citizen, but due to a serious injury, his contract was not renewed at the end of the season.

=== Telecom ===
In 2007, Li gave up being a professional footballer and went to work for PCCW. He played amateur football in the Hong Kong Third Division League for Telecom. He was too good at this level and scored 28 goals in two seasons.

Li scored 19 goals in the 2007–08 season to finish second in the goal scorers chart.。

=== Happy Valley ===
In the 2009–10 season, Happy Valley recruited Li and appointed him as the club's captain.

=== Tai Po ===
After Happy Valley was relegated, Li joined Tai Po. He scored 4 goals for his new club in his first four games, 3 of them are free kicks, helping the team defeat fellow New Territories rivals Pegasus and Tuen Mun. Tai Po's coach Cheung Bo Chun also claimed his performances have been phenomenal.
