= Saša Mus =

Croatian footballer

Personal information
- Date of birth: 19 July 1986 (age 40)
- Place of birth: Slavonski Brod, Croatia
- Height: 1.88 m (6 ft 2 in)
- Position: Defender

Senior career*
Years	Team	Apps	(Gls)
2004–2007	Marsonia	92	(2)
2007–2010	Croatia Sesvete	68	(1)
2010–2011	Elin Weiz	14	(0)
2011	GOŠK Gabela	14	(0)
2012	Beijing Baxy	11	(0)
2012–2013	Oriolik	10	(0)
2013	Zvijezda Gradačac	13	(1)
2013–2014	Happy Valley	9	(0)
- * Club domestic league appearances and goals as of 08:34, 5 June 2014 (UTC)

Saša Mus (born 19 July 1986) is a Croatian former professional footballer who last played for Hong Kong First Division League club Happy Valley as a defender.

== Club career ==
Born in Slavonski Brod, Mus started his playing career with Marsonia in the Druga HNL. Over the next years, he emerged as an important part of the squad. In 2007, he was transferred to another Druga HNL club Croatia Sesvete. With the club, Mus won promotion to Prva HNL the same year.

He then tasted foreign environment after joining SC Weiz of Austrian Regional League Central. He was not frequent in the Austrian club and so signed for GOŠK Gabela in the same year. After making 14 appearances for the club, he tried his luck with Beijing Baxy but he did not make a single appearance.

In 2012, he again returned to his country, this time with Oriolik in Treća HNL (third tier of Croatian football). He had a brief spell with Bosnian club Zvijezda Gradačac before again returning to Asia with Happy Valley of Hong Kong.

He was jailed for 12 months for match-fixing in 2014 and suspended for life by Hong Kong Football Association in 2015.
