= Yang Deqiang =

楊德強
- Yang Deqiang

Commissioner for Sports
- In office 2016.2.1–2022.10.31
- Preceded by: 首任（職位創設）
- Succeeded by: Huang Desen

Yuen LongDistrict Officer (Hong Kong)
- In office 2008.10.6–2013.1.8
- Leung Che-cheung

Personal details
- Born: July 4, 1961 (age 65)
- Citizenship: Chinese (Hong Kong)
- Children: two sons
- Education: The University of Hong Kong; The Chinese University of Hong Kong; Peking University
- Occupation: civil servant
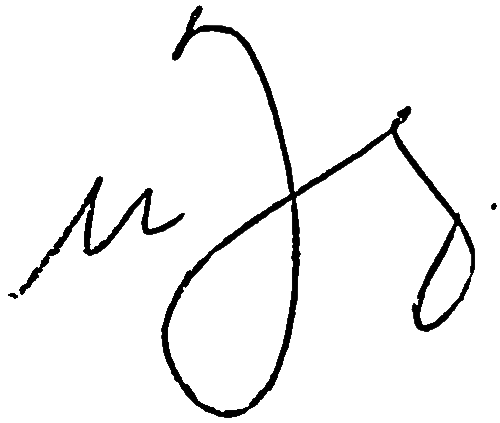
- Signature

Yang Deqiang (born 4 July 1961) is a Hong Kong civil servant who has held key positions including Sports Commissioner and District Officer of Yuen Long. He joined the Hong Kong Government in 1984 as a police inspector in the Royal Hong Kong Police Force, before transferring to the Administrative Officer grade in 1994. He has since served in various government departments. During his tenure as District Officer of Yuen Long, he handled a right-of-way dispute on Kam Sau Garden Road and coordinated the establishment of Tin Sau Market.

He was an amateur athlete who captained the University of Hong Kong football team and was named the university's Player of the Year in 1984. He also captained the handball team of the South China Athletic Association to a Hong Kong handball league championship, and served as a member of the squash league committee of the Hong Kong Squash Association. He was later appointed by the Hong Kong Government as Equestrian Events Coordinating Director for the equestrian events of the 2008 Summer Olympics. In February 2016, he became the first Commissioner for Sports, overseeing sports policy in Hong Kong, and served until the end of October 2022 following several extensions of his term. After his retirement, he was invited by the Hong Kong Government in October 2023 to return to public service as Director of the National Games Coordination Office, overseeing preparations for the 2025 National Games of China to be held in Hong Kong.

== Early life ==
Yang Deqiang (born 4 July 1961) grew up in a public housing estate with his parents. Despite their limited interest in sports, he developed a strong enthusiasm for athletics at an early age. While studying at Queen’s College, Hong Kong, he trained and competed in handball, football and basketball, and helped improve the school's performance in competitions organised by the Hong Kong Schools Sports Federation. During this period, the school won championships in handball and volleyball, while its track and field results improved significantly. He was also an avid football fan in his youth, often attending early-morning training sessions of the Eastern Sports Club and the Hong Kong Rangers FC at the Navy Stadium. He regarded Yau Chi-keung as his idol.

Yang later enrolled at The University of Hong Kong, where he joined the university football team and served as captain. He was also a member of the handball team of the South China Athletic Association, captaining the side from 1980 to 1982 and winning the Hong Kong Handball League championship. He graduated with a Bachelor of Arts degree in 1984 and was named the university's Athlete of the Year prior to graduation.

== Public service career ==
=== Colonial period ===
After graduating in 1984, Yang Deqiang joined the Hong Kong Government on 16 July that year as a police inspector in the Royal Hong Kong Police Force. Among his cohort was Lo Wai-chung, who later became Commissioner of Police. He was promoted to senior inspector in July 1987 and to chief inspector in May 1992. Yang obtained a Master of Business Administration degree from the The Chinese University of Hong Kong in 1993. After nearly a decade of service in the police force, he transferred to the Administrative Officer grade on 10 July 1994. Following his transfer, he was posted to the North District Office. In early 1996, he was reassigned to the Education Coordination Section of the Chief Secretary’s Office as Assistant Education Coordinator, where he supported Matthew Cheung in responding to questions on vocational education policy in the Legislative Council of Hong Kong.

=== Initial period after the transfer of sovereignty ===
Following the Handover of Hong Kong, Yang Deqiang was appointed Assistant Secretary for Financial Services, where he was responsible for corporate governance policy. In 1999, he was involved in revisions to the Companies Ordinance, including measures to relax regulations on company structure, record-keeping and disclosure requirements. In 2000, he was transferred to the Constitutional Affairs Bureau as Assistant Secretary, and remained in the post following the reorganisation of the Hong Kong Government in 2002. He later served in the Chief Executive’s Office. During this period, while overseeing mainland-related affairs, he pursued a Bachelor of Laws degree at Peking University, graduating in 2001.

On 12 January 2004, Yang was appointed Assistant Director of the Innovation and Technology Commission. Although seconded from a policy bureau to an executive department, he continued to work on innovation and technology policy and development. He also attended meetings of the Legislative Council of Hong Kong, where he explained policy initiatives, including the establishment of the Innovation and Technology Fund and the Applied Research Fund. In preparation for the equestrian events of the 2008 Summer Olympics and 2008 Summer Paralympics, which were hosted in Hong Kong, Yang was later assigned to the Home Affairs Bureau as one of the coordinators for the equestrian events.

=== Yuen Long District Officer ===
Yang Deqiang was appointed District Officer of Yuen Long on 6 October 2008 and was made a Justice of the Peace on the same day. Shortly before and after his appointment, a right-of-way dispute on Kam Sheung Road escalated, with tensions resurfacing in March 2009. The Hong Kong Government declined a proposal to repurchase the road, citing high land acquisition and maintenance costs, and negotiations subsequently broke down. Road owners then blocked access, causing severe traffic disruption. Yang, together with Assistant Commissioner for Transport Law Fung-ping, attended the scene to mediate. Clashes occurred between residents, villagers and truck drivers, resulting in minor physical altercations. The situation was later defused after mediation by Man Fu-wen, chairman of the San Tin Rural Committee. Further negotiations involved Lau Wong-fat, chairman of the Heung Yee Kuk. Following discussions, a consensus was reached under which Yang would apply to the Yuen Long District Council for a HK$1.5 million grant to repair the road, in exchange for reopening it to traffic during off-peak daytime hours. On 8 May, Yang formally presented the proposal at a meeting of the District Facilities Management Committee of the District Council. The improvement works were completed on 19 October.

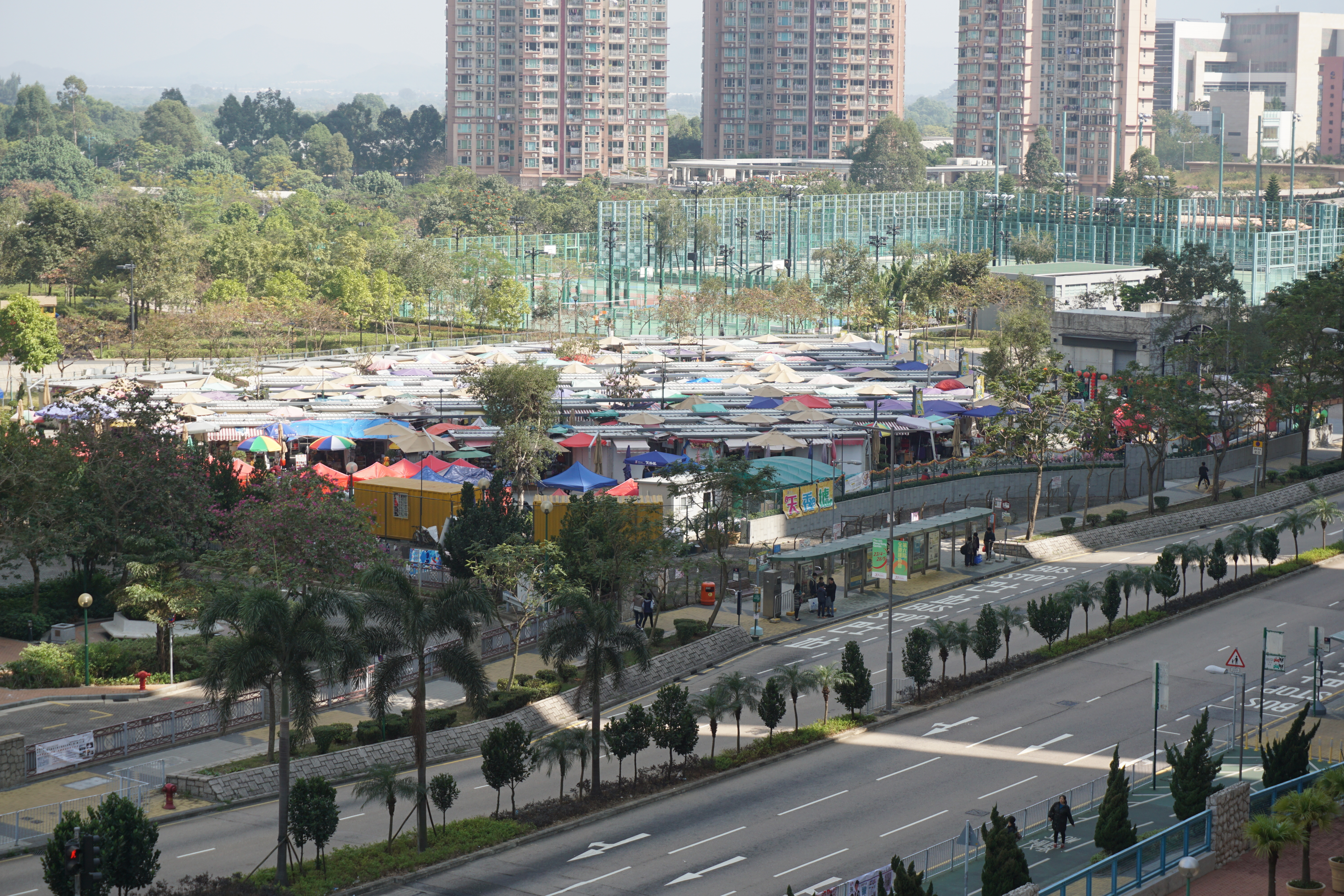
Tianxiu Market was established through the coordination of various departments under Yang Deqiang.

The Yuen Long District includes Tin Shui Wai, which was at the time labelled a "City of Tragedy". With support from the Hong Kong Government, Yang implemented a range of measures aimed at improving the area's public image. He continued existing community development initiativesand worked with the Pok Oi Hospital to provide services for young people and families, promoting healthy living. During the 2009 swine flu pandemic, he also organised briefings on prevention and control measures. A sports enthusiast, Yang promoted sports development in the district during his tenure. He supported the Hong Kong Games, in which the Yuen Long District team won overall championships in 2009 and 2011. He also oversaw improvements to training facilities for the Yuen Long FC and Tin Shui Wai Pegasus FC. In response to high retail prices in Tin Shui Wai, Yang was tasked by the Hong Kong Government with coordinating the establishment of Tin Sau Market in 2012, providing more affordable shopping options for residents. Yang completed his term as District Officer of Yuen Long on 8 January 2013, and was succeeded by Mak Chun-yu.

=== Return to the General Political Department ===
After stepping down as District Officer of Yuen Long, Yang Deqiang returned to Government Headquarters and was promoted to Deputy Secretary for Financial Services and the Treasury, where he was responsible for overseeing treasury arrangements for public works projects. During his tenure, he was promoted to Chief Administrative Officer Staff Grade B in early 2014 and was reappointed as a Justice of the Peace. During this period, proceedings in the Legislative Council of Hong Kong were at times delayed by filibustering, which affected the progress of funding approvals. In the 2014–15 financial year, delays to 21 projects under his purview resulted in cost increases exceeding HK$1 billion. Among them, the redevelopment project of the Hong Kong Buddhist Hospital required re-tendering.

After about three years in the bureau, Yang was transferred in mid-December 2015 to serve as Deputy Secretary for Home Affairs, succeeding Mak King-nin. The post was the most senior civil service position responsible for sports policy in Hong Kong. His portfolio included sports development and strategic planning, covering major sporting events, community sports promotion and public recreational facilities. He was also responsible for following up on development plans of the Hong Kong Sports Institute.

=== Sports Commissioner ===
In his 2012 election platform, Leung Chun-ying proposed appointing a representative from the sports sector as Commissioner for Sports to promote sports development in Hong Kong. However, following a review in 2014, Tsang Tak-sing, then Secretary for Home Affairs, concluded that the proposal was not feasible. The post of Commissioner for Sports was subsequently created in the 2016 Policy Address. Yang Tak-keung, who was not from the sports sector, was appointed to the position and assumed office on 1 February 2016. In response to public concerns, Yang stated that the Government considered Administrative Officers to be well suited to the role, citing their management experience and familiarity with sports-related matters. He also noted that the post of Commissioner for Sports was comparable in rank and responsibilities to that of a Deputy Secretary.

As Commissioner for Sports, Yang Deqiang sought to continue the policy directions established during the tenure of Mak King-nin, focusing on promoting sports at the community level, supporting elite athletes, and enhancing Hong Kong's capacity to host major sporting events. His responsibilities included supporting Hong Kong's participation in the Olympic Games, as well as reviewing and improving the governance of sports facilities, including the Kai Tak Sports Park and the Tseung Kwan O Football Training Centre. He also oversaw a comprehensive review of Hong Kong's sports policy. Following the outbreak of the Zika virus, Yang introduced a series of precautionary measures for athletes participating in the 2016 Summer Olympics, including pre-departure briefings, provision of preventive supplies during the Games, and post-event medical testing.

=== Kai Tak Sports Park ===
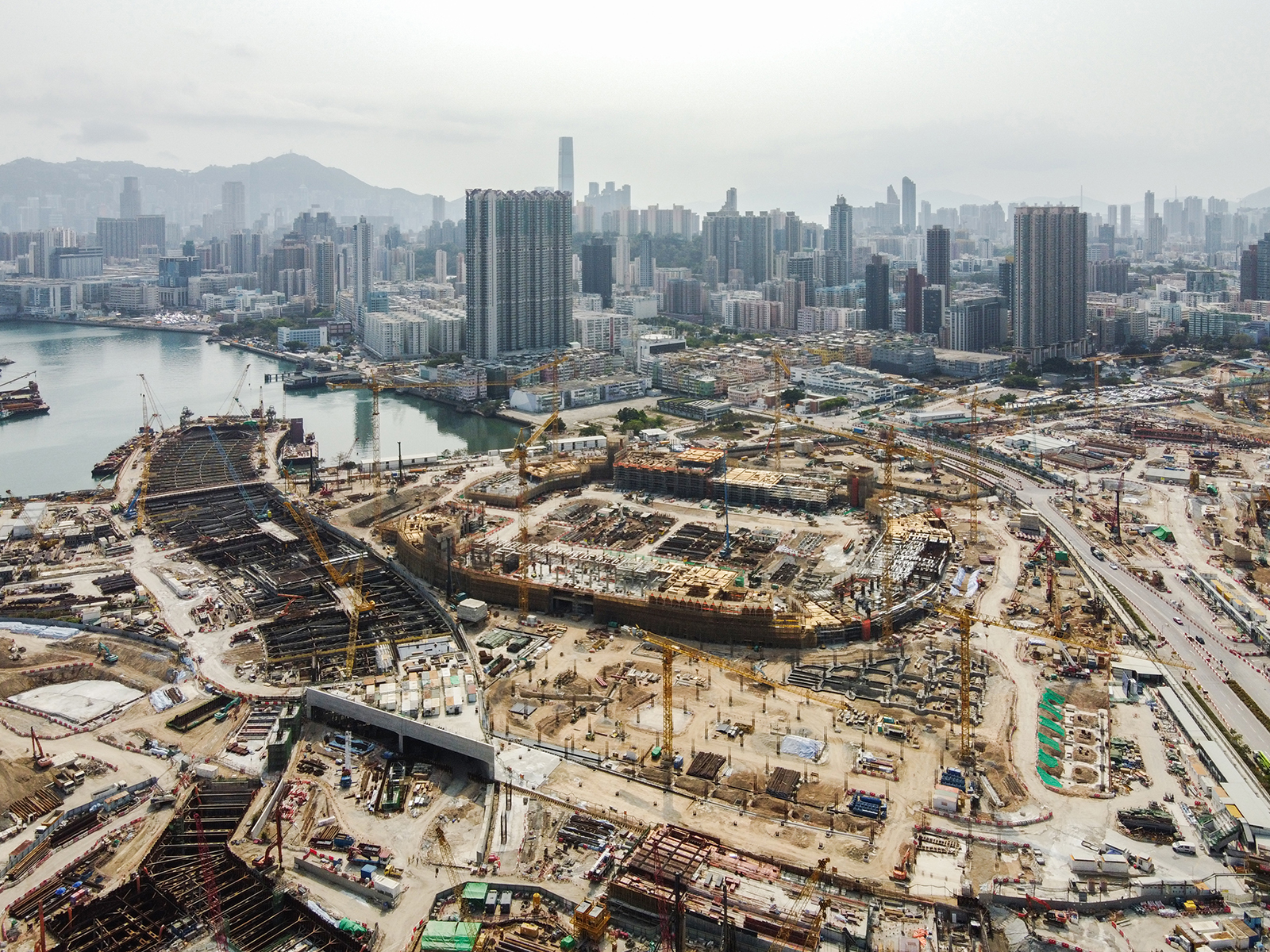
Construction site of Kai Tak Sports Park in 2021

The Kai Tak Sports Park project advanced following Yang Deqiang's appointment as Commissioner for Sports. He noted that the project cost would exceed the HK$25 billion estimate made in 2009, but rejected characterising it as a "white elephant”, citing strong demand for sports facilities in Hong Kong. Following studies and public consultation, the Government adopted a build–operate–transfer (BOT) model, granting the successful bidder operating rights for 25 years while committing approximately HK$31.9 billion in construction costs. The arrangement also included compensation of up to HK$60 million for the unsuccessful bidder, which drew public concern over the tendering process. In response, Yang stated that government investment was necessary given the project's expected initial losses, and that the compensation mechanism was intended to encourage competition in the tender. He added that restarting the tender process would increase costs by an estimated HK$1.8 billion. The funding proposal was subsequently approved by the Legislative Council of Hong Kong, and the contract was awarded to New World Development in December 2018. Construction commenced in April 2019, with the project overseen by Carrie Lam, Lau Kong-wah, Tse Ling Kit-ching, and Yang.

During the COVID-19 pandemic in Hong Kong, progress of the Kai Tak Sports Park project drew public attention. In an interview with RTHK, Yang Deqiang stated that the contract included a delay penalty of HK$4.3 million per day, and that any cost overruns would be handled in accordance with standard government public works procedures. Addressing concerns over costs and the private operating model, he explained that venue hire charges would be set with reference to those of the Leisure and Cultural Services Department and non-governmental organisations. He added that the contract required the sports park to reserve time slots each year for major events and public use, which he said would help meet both event and community needs. Yang later acknowledged delays in the delivery of construction materials to Hong Kong, but stated that these were not expected to affect the scheduled completion date.

In early August 2021, Yang stated that the Kai Tak Sports Park would host more international ranking and qualification events after its opening, with the aim of helping Hong Kong athletes qualify for major competitions such as the Olympic Games and the Asian Games. On 26 August 2021, the State Council of the People’s Republic of China announced that the 2025 National Games of China would be jointly hosted by Guangdong, Hong Kong and Macao. Yang noted that the main stadium of the sports park could accommodate rugby and football matches, while the indoor arena would be suitable for table tennis and badminton. Final arrangements would be determined based on venue suitability and public demand. He also indicated that major events, including the Hong Kong Sevens, would be relocated from the Hong Kong Stadium to the new complex after its completion, and that the capacity of the existing stadium could be reduced once the new facilities became fully operational.

=== Football development ===
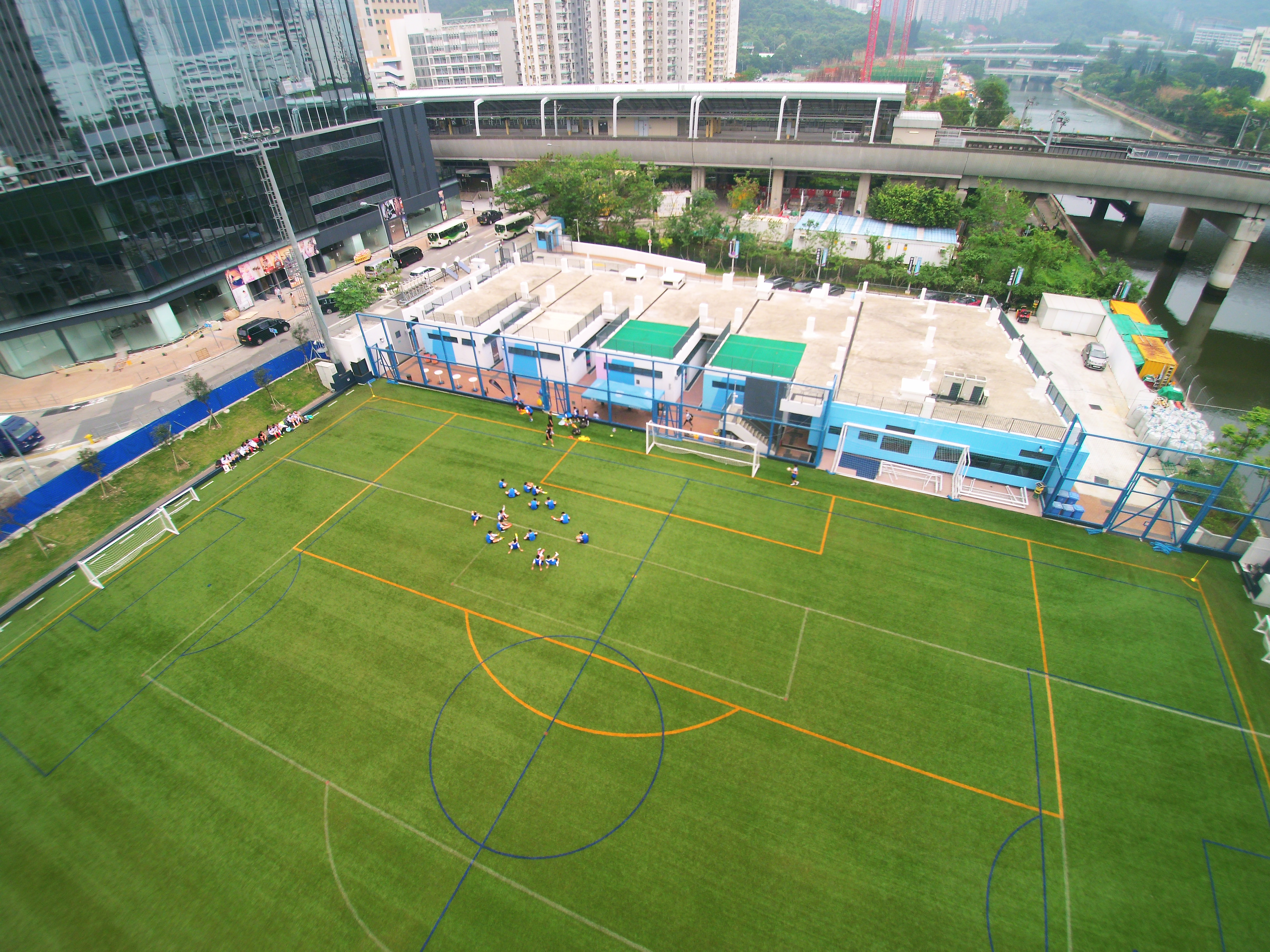
The Hong Kong government originally planned to reclaim the land of the Jockey Club Kitchee Centre and transfer it to the Housing Department

In late September 2016, the Housing Department conducted a private consultation with the Sha Tin District Council on a proposal to resume the site of the Jockey Club Kitchee Centre, which had been in use for only one year, for public housing development. The proposal drew criticism from the football community and the wider public, and legislators from across the political spectrum expressed concern. During the controversy, Yang Deqiang did not make any public statement or take a visible role in the matter, leading to criticism that he had not fulfilled a coordinating role in cross-departmental sports-related issues. A few days later, the Hong Kong Government announced that the project would be implemented in phases, with development of the site deferred. The first phase of the proposal was rejected by the Town Planning Board in October 2017 amid strong opposition, and the plan was subsequently abandoned.

In June 2017, South China Athletic Association announced its withdrawal from the Hong Kong Premier League, a move that attracted widespread attention in the local sports community. Some commentators attributed the decision to a perceived lack of government support for football development. In response, Yang Deqiang outlined the Government's efforts to promote football in Hong Kong, citing strong ticket sales for the Premier League Asia Trophy 2017 and high attendance at matches involving Eastern SC in the AFC Champions League. He also stated that the Government allocated substantial funding each year to the Hong Kong Football Association and to district teams.

The second five-year government funding plan for the Hong Kong Football Association concluded in 2020. In April of the same year, the Audit Commission published a report identifying 14 deficiencies in the association's governance and financial management. Yang Deqiang continued to support the association's application for further funding, both within and outside the Legislative Council of Hong Kong. He noted that under the new funding arrangement, part of the allocation would be channelled directly to clubs rather than through the association, with the aim of improving accountability and ensuring effective use of resources. After a new three-year funding package was approved in July, Yang stated that the association and clubs should strengthen governance and professionalism, and place greater emphasis on youth development. He also cautioned that future funding applications would be subject to stricter scrutiny.

In November 2021, after reviewing the new five-year plan, Yang stated that the Hong Kong Football Association had begun to show improvements in its governance and administration. He also commented on proposals within the local football community to introduce betting on local matches as a means of promoting the sport. Yang expressed reservations about the idea, stating that it lacked precedent and had not been sufficiently substantiated.

==== Lü Liyao incident ====
In November 2017, Hong Kong track and field athlete Lui Lai-yiu publicly alleged that she had been sexually assaulted by her former coach, amid the #IamSports campaign. When asked about the case on 3 December, Yang Deqiang did not provide a substantive response. When questioned about whether guidelines on sexual harassment in the sports sector would be introduced, he declined to comment, stating only that the Chief Executive had already responded before leaving the scene. Yang's handling of the incident drew public criticism, with some commentators accusing him of adopting an evasive stance and of failing to address concerns about safeguarding and gender-related issues in the sports sector.

Subsequently, the Equal Opportunities Commission and the Sports Federation & Olympic Committee of Hong Kong, China stepped up efforts to promote education and awareness on the prevention of sexual harassment in sport. The two organisations also held a public forum in January 2018, which Yang attended. After the event, Yang stated that he would not comment on the specific case as it was under investigation by the Hong Kong Police Force, but said that the Home Affairs Bureau would work with relevant organisations to combat sexual harassment in the sports sector.

==== COVID-19 pandemic ====
During the COVID-19 pandemic in Hong Kong, the Hong Kong Government closed sports venues and suspended leagues. For athletes preparing for the 2020 Summer Olympics, Yang Deqiang arranged exemptions from certain restrictions to allow continued training. For example, Siobhan Haughey, who later won two silver medals in Tokyo, was permitted to train daily after returning to Hong Kong from a FINA event in December 2020. In early February 2021, under Yang's coordination, the Hong Kong Football Association reached an agreement with the Government to resume football matches. While spectators were required to wear masks and observe distancing measures, players were exempted from mask requirements during matches. In May 2021, the Eastern Long Lions held an exhibition game in which players wore masks. Yang attended and indicated that discussions would be held with the Hong Kong Basketball Association on relaxing such requirements. Restrictions were subsequently eased in July 2021, allowing basketball competitions to resume without mask requirements for players.

Travel restrictions also affected Hong Kong football teams' participation in regional competitions, including the 2022 FIFA World Cup qualification (AFC), the AFC Champions League, and the AFC Cup. Representatives of the football sector called for exemptions from quarantine arrangements. Yang coordinated relevant measures, enabling members of the Hong Kong team to resume training and participate in AFC Cup matches after returning to Hong Kong in June 2021.

In August 2021, Yang concluded discussions with the Hong Kong Amateur Athletic Association regarding the Hong Kong Marathon, which was later rescheduled in October under public health restrictions. Measures included a reduced number of participants, quarantine requirements for overseas runners, mandatory COVID-19 vaccination, and expanded facilities at refreshment stations. Yang did not initially grant exemptions for the Hong Kong Sevens, citing the high-contact nature of the sport and financial concerns in the absence of spectators. In September 2022, the Hong Kong Marathon was cancelled amid uncertainty over public health measures during the fifth wave of the pandemic, drawing criticism. An agreement was later reached to stage the event in February 2023. Subsequently, Yang coordinated the successful staging of the 2022 Hong Kong Sevens in November under pandemic control measures.

==== 2020 Tokyo Olympics ====
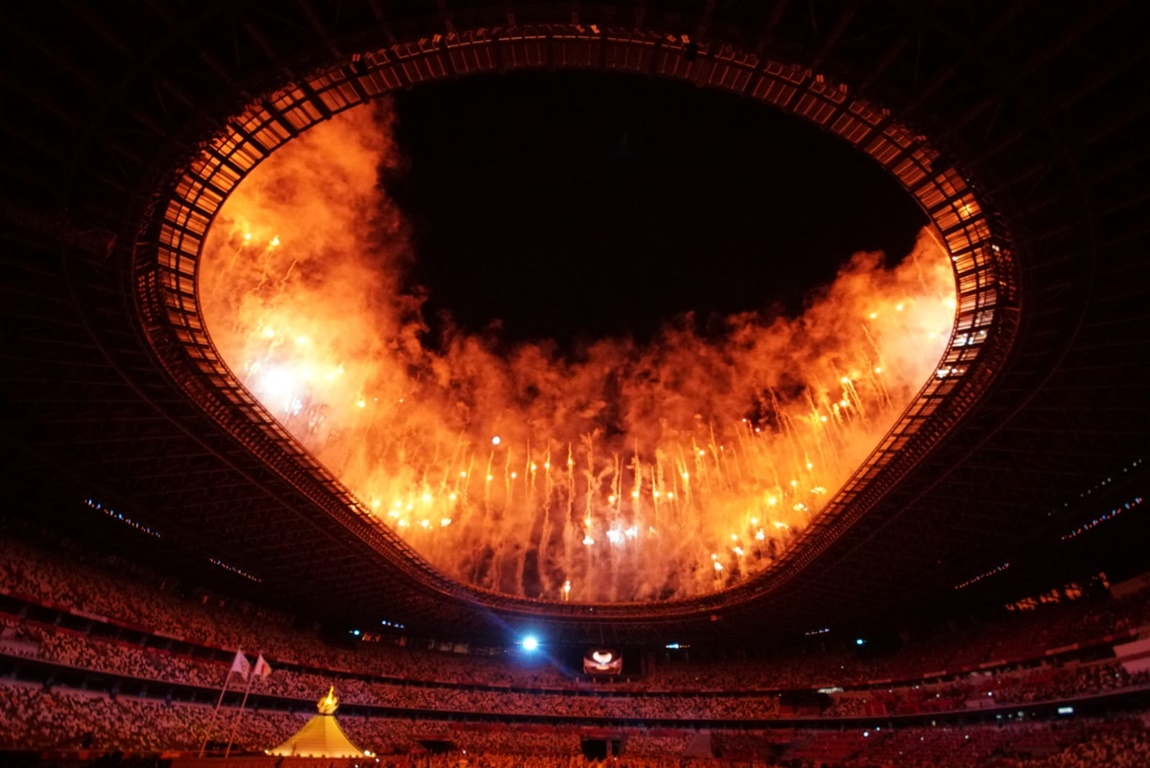
Yang Deqiang was responsible for coordinating the joint broadcast and coverage of the 2020 Tokyo Olympics by five Hong Kong television stations.

In May 2021, the Hong Kong Government announced that it had acquired the broadcasting rights to the 2020 Summer Olympics for five local television broadcasters. Yang Deqiang was responsible for coordinating the broadcasting arrangements, including the organisation of a joint interview team. The absence of RTHK from the broadcasting plan drew public criticism. Yang explained that RTHK lacked the technical capacity and experience required for live coverage, and would therefore broadcast highlights only. Under the arrangements, each broadcaster was required to air all events involving the Hong Kong team, and to provide coverage of Hong Kong athletes' competitions within a specified period following the Games.

Amid the ongoing impact of the anti-extradition bill protests, some pro-establishment members of the Legislative Council of Hong Kong expressed concern that athletes might make political statements during the 2020 Summer Olympics. Yang Deqiang stated that athletes had signed pre-departure agreements which included provisions prohibiting the expression of political messages during competitions. During the Games, Ng Ka-long came under criticism from Democratic Alliance for the Betterment and Progress of Hong Kong legislator Mok Ka-chun, who questioned his decision to compete in an all-black outfit without the Hong Kong regional emblem and called for his withdrawal. Ng explained that this was due to the absence of a sponsorship arrangement and the lack of approval for the use of the emblem. The controversy also drew attention to the roles of the Sports Federation and Olympic Committee of Hong Kong, China and the Hong Kong Sports Institute. Yang later described the incident as a misunderstanding, stating that alternative arrangements might have been possible had assistance been sought earlier. He also urged the public to focus on athletes' performances rather than the controversy. Ng was subsequently eliminated in the competition. Following the incident, Yang rejected criticism of inadequate coordination and response by the Government, and suggested that communication between the Hong Kong Badminton Association and athletes could be improved.

During the Games, Yang accompanied Carrie Lam to watch members of the Hong Kong Olympic team compete on several occasions. After Cheung Ka-long secured Hong Kong's second-ever Olympic gold medal, Yang stated that the fencing team's success was the result of efforts accumulated over many generations, and that no additional resources would be allocated to fencing on account of the victory. Following the Olympics, he announced that the selection mechanism for key funded sports would be reviewed, while emphasizing that medal results were not the sole criterion. He also clarified that a long-term development plan for the fencing team—including the expansion of training facilities—had already been formulated prior to the Games, and therefore no extra support was granted as a direct consequence of the gold medal.

==== Extension of term and retirement ====
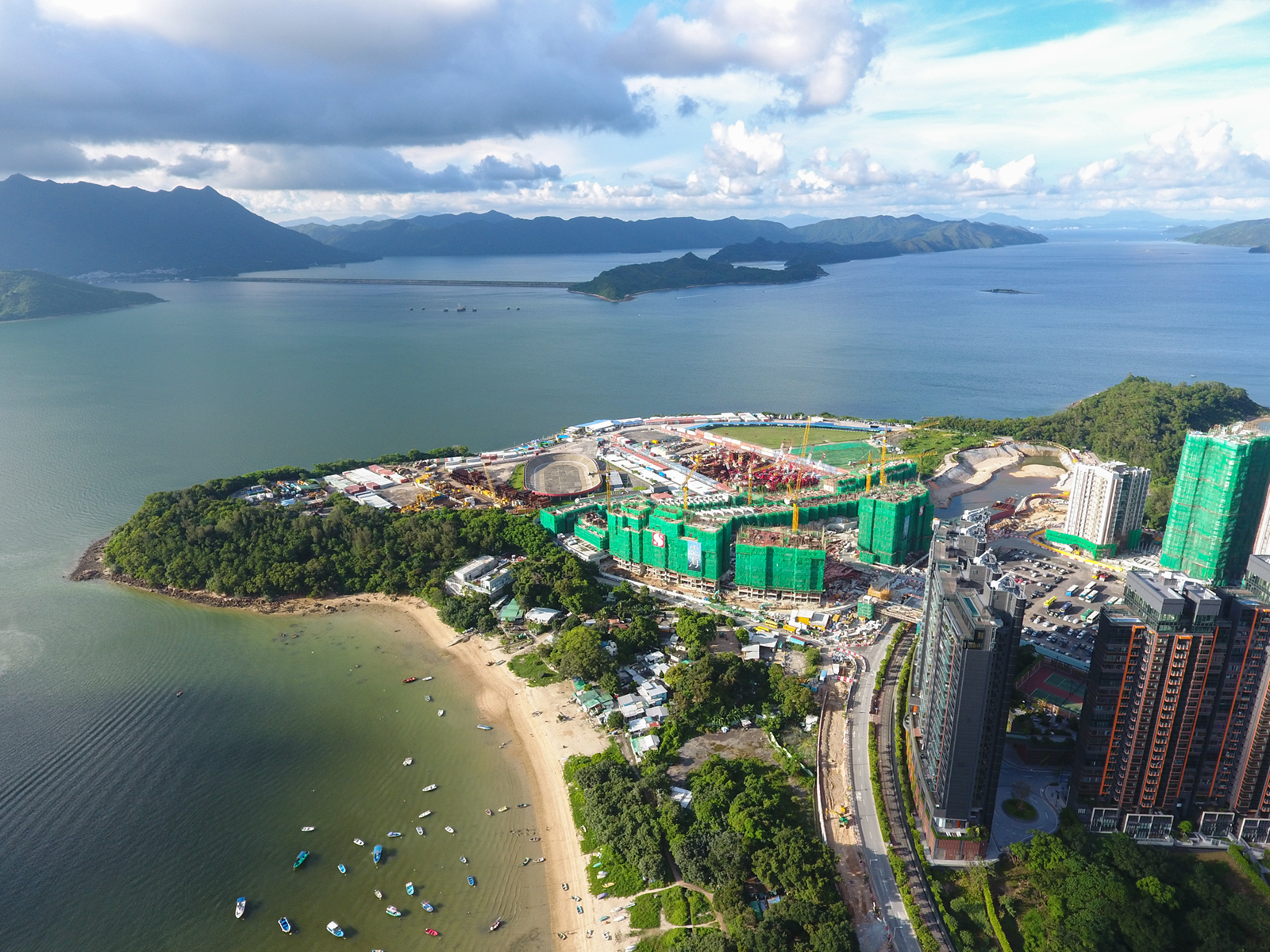
During his extended term as sports commissioner, Yang Deqiang implemented the construction of a sports park in Baishi, Ma'anshan.

Yang Deqiang reached the retirement age stipulated in his civil service contract in July 2021. However, due to the postponement of the 2020 Tokyo Olympics to July and August of that year, the Hong Kong government granted him a four-month extension, deferring his retirement from the civil service and his resignation as a Justice of the Peace to November 2021. In November 2021, he was further granted a one-year contract extension, allowing additional time for the government to identify a successor to the Commissioner for Sports. Following this extension, he responded to the Standard Chartered Hong Kong Marathon's classification of the phrase "Add Oil to Hong Kong" as a political message, stating that its interpretation depends on the user's intent and the context in which it is expressed, and that under normal circumstances, the use of "Add Oil" would not constitute an offence.

During his extended term, Yang Deqiang was responsible for preparations for the 2022 Asian Games and handled a number of sports-related incidents. In April 2022, he criticized the Hong Kong men’s basketball team for withdrawing from the qualifiers for the 2021 FIBA Asia Cup due to a lack of funding, and noted that the Hong Kong Basketball Association could apply to the government for financial support to participate. Although the Association later explained that its withdrawal was due to the government's closure of venues amid the pandemic, which made training and preparation impossible, Yang requested that it reapply for participation. Owing to the ongoing pandemic, the 2022 Asian Games were subsequently postponed to 2023, and the Asia Cup qualifiers were also delayed with a shortened schedule. During this period, Yuen Long Stadium was closed for reconstruction, and the Pak Shek Sports Park project in Pak Shek New Town, Ma On Shan was initiated and announced. In addition, from 1 July 2022, the post of Commissioner for Sports was transferred from the Home Affairs Bureau to the Culture, Sports and Tourism Bureau.

Yang Deqiang concluded his term as Commissioner for Sports on 31 October 2022. As the Hong Kong government was unable to identify a successor with relevant sports expertise from within the civil service, the post remained vacant. He also encouraged retired athletes to apply through open recruitment to join the government. Prior to leaving office, he stated that large-scale events would gradually return to Hong Kong following the pandemic, and that while the anti-epidemic measures in place at the time had only a limited impact on athletes, they did cause some inconvenience to inbound travellers. Following his departure, Cheng Ching-wan served as Acting Commissioner until August 2023, when Wong Tak-sum assumed the position.

==== National Games ====
After retiring, Yang was invited by the Hong Kong government to return to public service as Head of the Hong Kong Organising Committee for the 15th National Games. He took up the post on 16 October 2023 and is responsible for planning the events to be held in Hong Kong in 2025, as well as coordinating with Guangdong and Macau on the joint hosting of the Games.

== Personal life ==
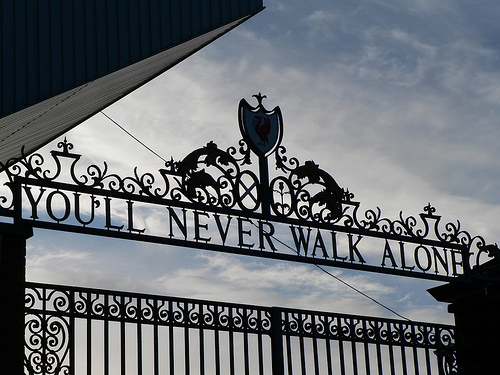
Yang Deqiang and his two sons are all fans of Liverpool Football Club.

Yang Deqiang is married and has two sons. His elder son, Le Wen, was active in hockey and softball, while his younger son, Le Yan, took part in weightlifting. Both sons also played youth football, with the elder son selected for the Hong Kong under-13 team. They attended Bonham Road Government Primary School, and the elder son later undertook an internship with the Hong Kong Sports Foundation. Prior to Yang's retirement, both sons had moved to Europe.

Yang's primary leisure activity is squash. He has served as a member of the Squash League Committee of the Hong Kong Squash Association and is a regular attendee at matches held at venues under the Hong Kong Football Association. Sport is a shared interest within his family, and they often arrange sporting activities even during holidays. He became a supporter of Liverpool Football Club under the influence of his sons, and the family would travel to Anfield to watch matches on a near-annual basis.

== Honor ==
=== Special Merit ===
- Justice of the Peace (JP) (6 October 2008 – 8 January 2013; 1 July 2014 – 29 October 2021)

=== Title ===
- Yeung Tak-keung, JP (6 October 2008 – 8 January 2013; 1 July 2014 – 29 October 2021)

== Related entries ==
- Kai Tak Sports Park
- Equestrian events at the 2008 Summer Olympic Games
