= Hong Kong Marathon =

Annual race in China held since 1997

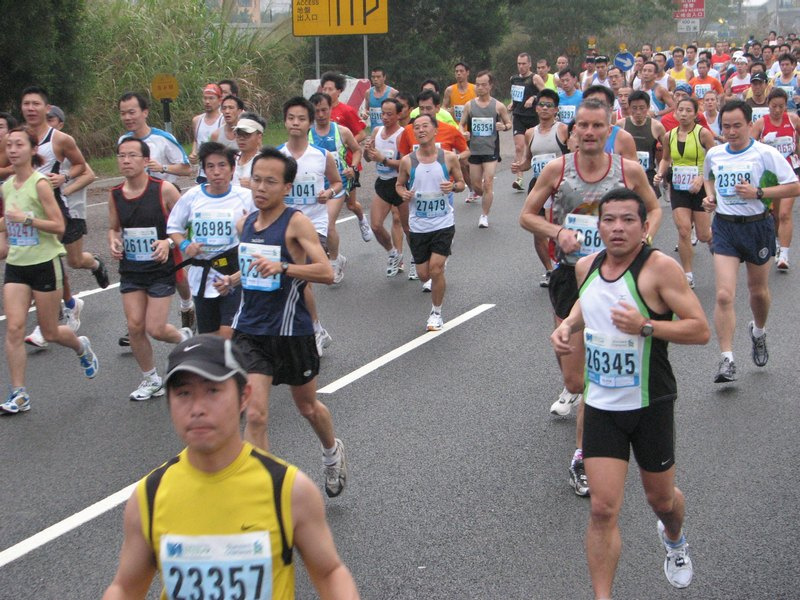
- Hong Kong Marathon in West Kowloon, 2007
- Date: February
- Location: Hong Kong
- Event type: Road
- Distance: Marathon, Half marathon and 10 km
- Primary sponsor: Standard Chartered Bank
- Established: 1997 (29 years ago) (Standard Chartered era)
- Course records: Men: 2:09:20 (Kenya) Barnabas Kiptum (2019); Women: 2:26:13 (Belarus) Volha Mazuronak (2019)
- Website: Hong Kong Marathon
- Participants: 4,744 (2019)

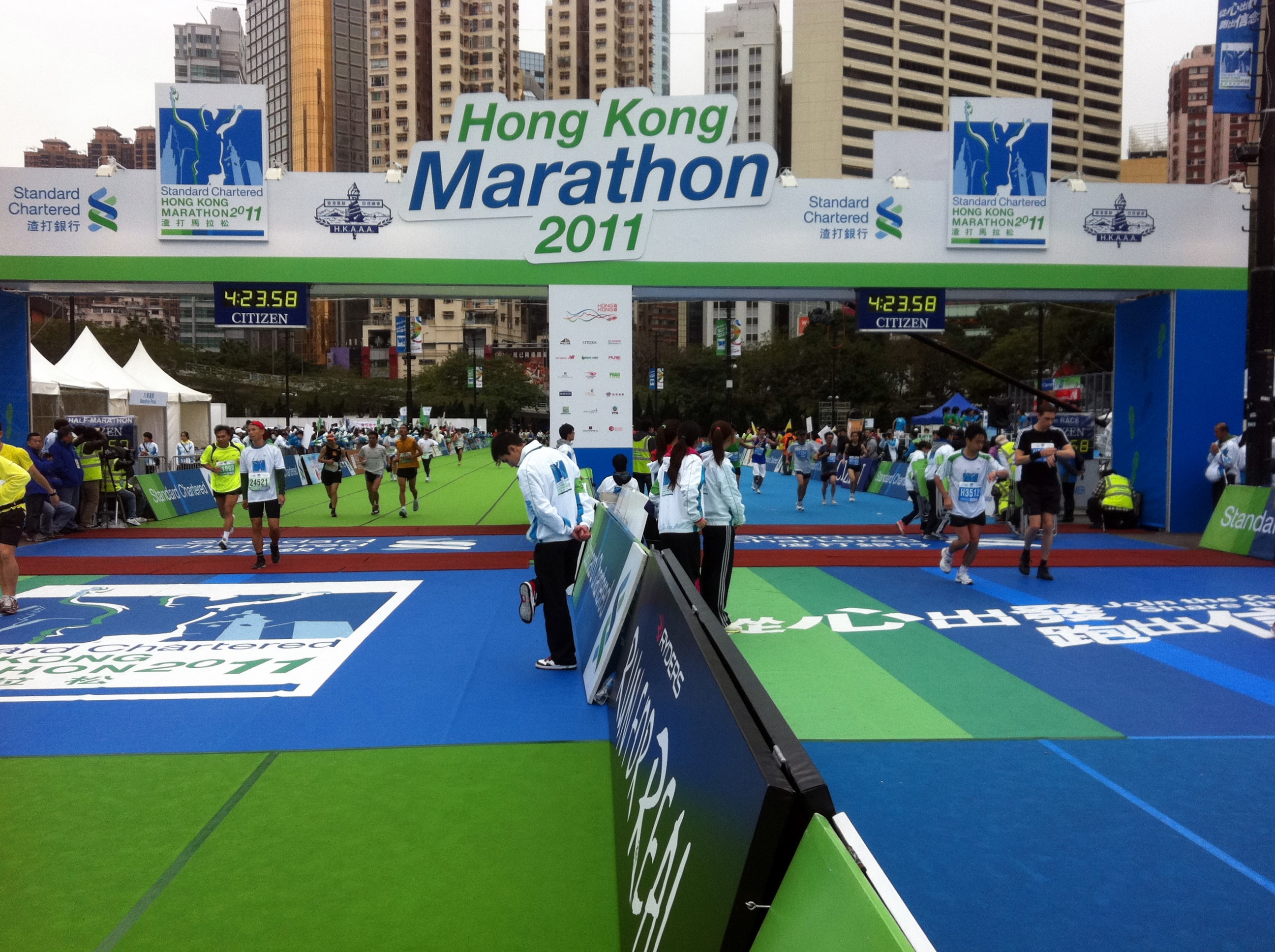
Finish line in 2011

The Hong Kong Marathon (Chinese: 香港馬拉松), sponsored by Standard Chartered Bank, is an annual marathon race held in January or February in Hong Kong. In addition to the full marathon, a 10 km run and a half marathon are also held. Around 70,000 runners take part each year across all events.

High levels of humidity and a difficult course make finishing times for the Hong Kong Marathon comparatively slower than other large marathons. The course records were both set in 2019. Kenyan Barnabas Kiptum holds the men's record of 2:09:20 hours while Belarusian Volha Mazuronak holds the women's record of 2:26:13 hours.

The marathon is categorized as a Gold Label Road Race by World Athletics. (Note: The Hong Kong Marathon was first categorized as an IAAF Bronze Label road race by International Association of Athletics Federations (IAAF) for the 2012 race, and was upgraded to a Silver Label for the 2013 race. The race remained a Silver Label race in 2014 and 2015 and was upgraded to a Gold Label for the 2016 race.)

The Hong Kong Marathon has hosted the Asian Marathon Championship race on five occasions (2002, 2008, 2013, 2015 and 2024).

== History ==
=== Initial era ===
The race traces its history back to 1981 when the first race was held in Sek Kong comprising four circuits of the roads around Sek Kong Camp where it started and finished. The race continued to be held here during the 80s (see records below). It became the Hong Kong-Shenzhen Marathon, launched by the Hong Kong Amateur Athletic Association. The route was between Sheung Shui and Shenzhen. The race endured organisational difficulties due to a lack of funding and was not held from 1989 to 1991. After two further editions, the race was again suspended from 1994 to 1996.

=== Standard Chartered era ===
Standard Chartered Bank stepped in as a title sponsor for the 1997 race and it garnered a field of 1,000 runners. The relaunch of the race saw increased participation from top-level East African runners – the men's race has been won by either a Kenyan or Ethiopian runner for all but two years from 1997 to 2012.

The 1998 marathon established a new course, starting at Tsing Ma Bridge and ending at the newly finished Hong Kong International Airport on Chek Lap Kok. The total number of entrants increased to 6,000 participants. In 1999, the race was moved to urban areas for the first time, starting in Central, ending at Sham Shui Po Sports Ground, with 7,000 participants. The route was altered again in 2000, as it started from Hong Kong Cultural Centre, Tsim Sha Tsui, and ended at the Sham Shui Po Sports Ground. The half-marathon was added, alongside the already-existing full marathon and 10 km race.

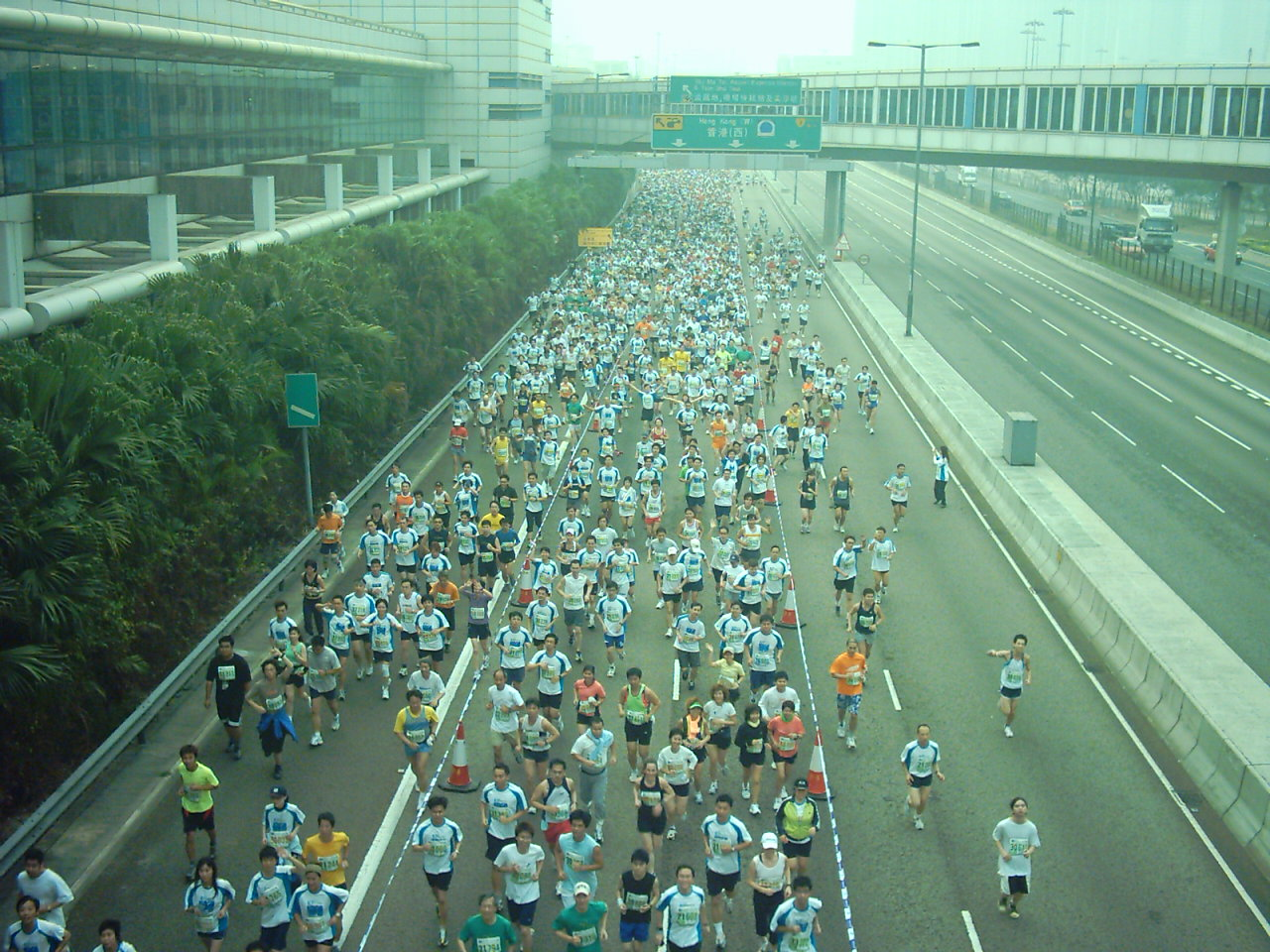
West Kowloon Highway at Olympic station under heavy air pollution, 2006

In 2001, the number of participants exceeded 10,000. The racecourse started from Nathan Road, then out to West Kowloon, onto West Kowloon Highway, followed by Cheung Tsing Tunnel, Tsing Ma Bridge, Ting Kau Bridge, then going all the way back into Western Harbour Crossing, ending at Golden Bauhinia Plaza in Wan Chai North.

The race was incorporated as one of the four legs of the Standard Chartered-sponsored The Greatest Race on Earth in 2005.

In 2006, the marathon was held on 12 February, with a prize fund of US$100,000. Almost 40,000 joined the Marathon. Two fainted during the race and one died on 14 February, resulting in the competition's first fatality. Reflecting this, first-aid services were introduced for the 2007 edition, but weather conditions seriously affected the runners. A record-breaking number of 6249 participants took part, 16.7% of whom experienced an injury. Hot weather sent 35 participants to hospital, including one young runner who died.

==== 2008 ====
In 2008, the marathon was held on 17 February, participated by some 42,000 runners, of which over 30,000 joined the 10 km event. (Originally 49,000 had signed up but 7,000 of them did not turn up.)

The 10 km race took place at Island Eastern Corridor instead of Western Harbour Crossing like in previous years. The race track started from City Garden in North Point, and ran eastwards until Shau Kei Wan, where it made a U-turn, back along with westbound IEC and ended at Victoria Park, near the western terminus of the IEC. Due to the proximity of Island Eastern Corridor from residential blocks such as those at City Garden, and also the early starting time of the races (05:10 to 06:40), residents complained about noises as loud as 60dB. The organizer, however, stated that it hopes to use IEC again for the 2009 Marathon since it successfully alleviated the problem of large numbers of runners rushing into Western Harbour Crossing, which made breathing difficult within the tunnel. The new route was welcomed by the participants, saying that it was better than the old one.

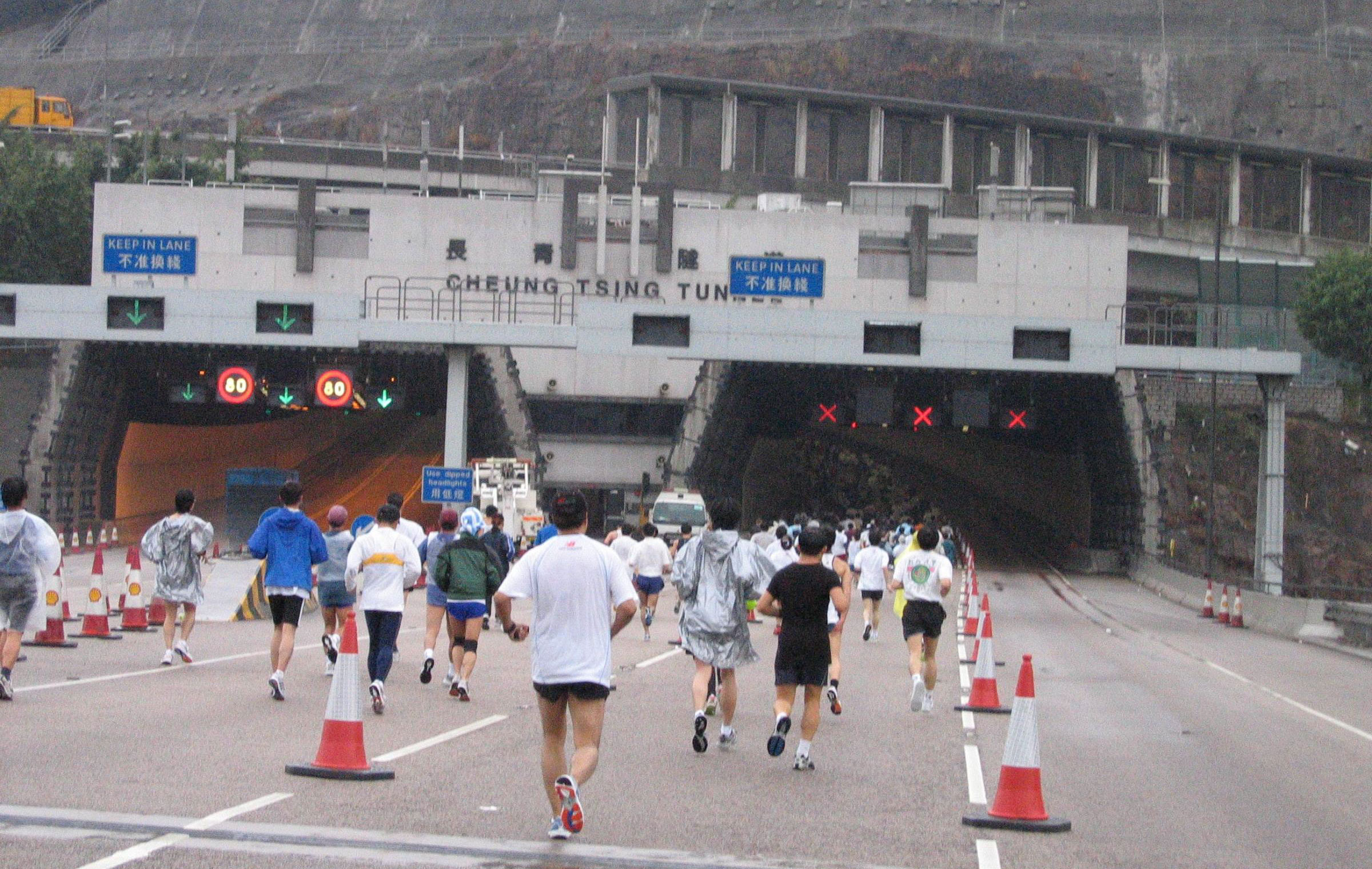
Entering Cheung Tsing Tunnel

The full and half marathon's race tracks remained generally the same, starting from Nathan Road, Tsim Sha Tsui, then going out to West Kowloon using Austin Road, followed by West Kowloon Highway and Tsing Kwai Highway, where half-marathoners turn back. Full-marathoners continue through Cheung Tsing Tunnel, then do a return trip each on Tsing Ma Bridge and Ting Kau Bridge. Competitors then ran back all the way to West Kowloon, joining half-marathoners again at Kwai Chung, and into Western Harbour Crossing. The finishing point, however, was changed to Victoria Park instead of the Golden Bauhinia Plaza in Wan Chai North. This arrangement was welcomed by elite athletes, citing that it would improve their performance. Japanese runner Koichioro Fukuoka won the full marathon in 2:16:50, ending Kenya's four-year domination of the event.

==== 2009 ====
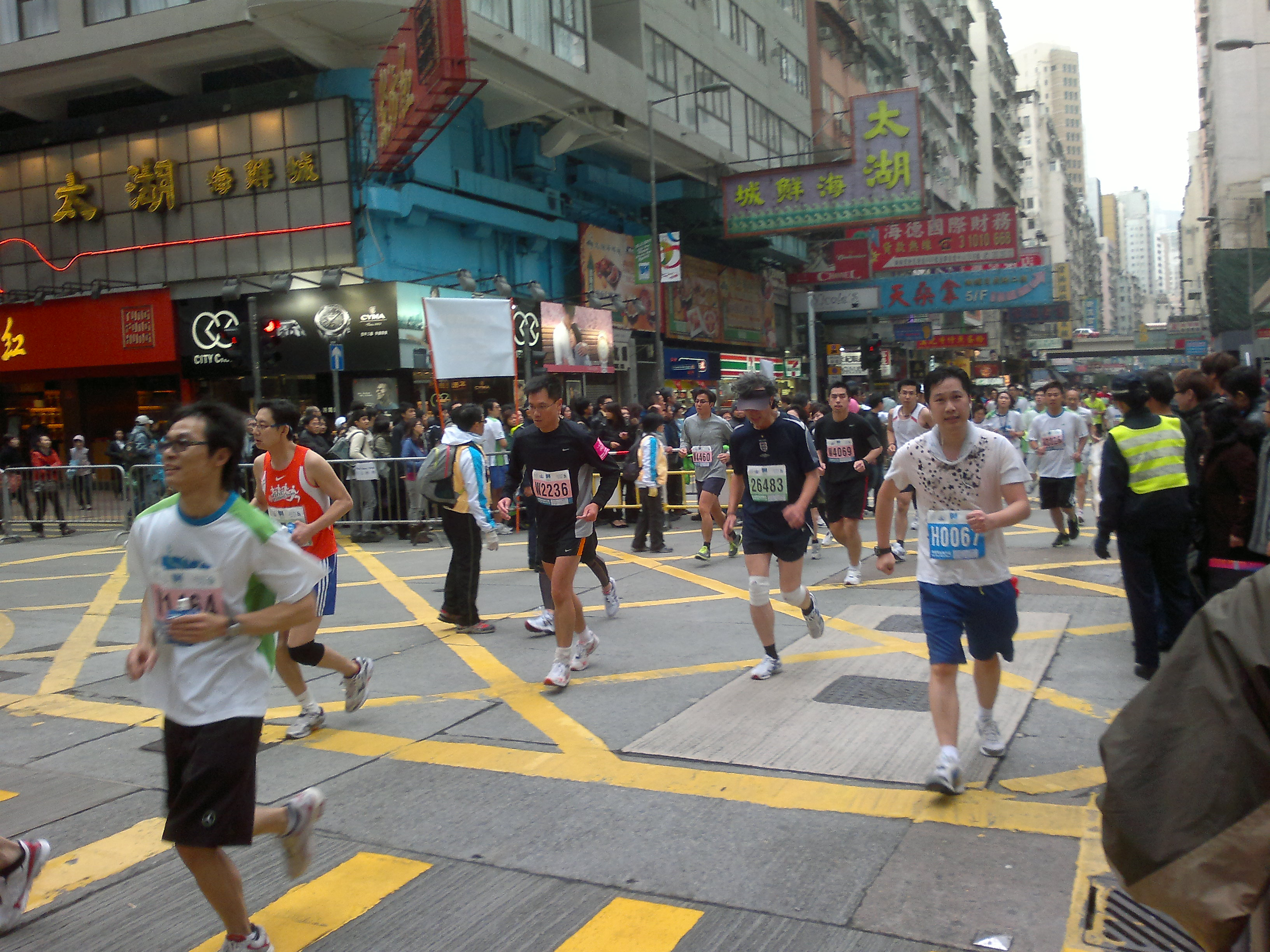
Lockhart Road in 2011

The race for 2009 took place on 8 February, with the courses for all events remaining the same as the previous year. About 55,000 people enrolled, among which 51,272 runners turned up (of which 31,000 were of the 10 km event, 7000 in full marathon), breaking previous records. The prize pool was US$100,000, with the winner getting US$20,000. Kenyan runner Cyprian Kiogora Mwobi won the full marathon in 2:14:57, setting a new course record. The women's title was won by Winnie Frida Kwamboka Nyansikera, also Kenyan, in 2:41:25.

The finishing rate this year was 98%. The injury count was 394, of which 16 were sent to hospital (including a case due to a temperature), down from 31 in 2008. 5000 runners requested massage due to cramps. Blind students participated in the 10 km race with an escort by their teachers. The relative humidity that day was high at 60%-85%, making the race less comfortable. The inclination on the course was also a subject of complaint.

Two runners were found using identical number bibs with the number "4", and this spurred discussion. The number belonged to the Hong Kong delegate, Lau Kwong-man. Several days later, his coach, Ng Fai-yeung, admitted that he took one bib (Lau got two bibs for being an invited runner, one in front and one on rear) from Lau, wore it, and accompanied Leung Yuen-fan, another teammate, in the race. The event committee delivered its verdict on 12 February with reference to the scandal, disqualifying Lau and Leung from the race. The HKAAA has considered holding a disciplinary hearing on the matter.

==== 2010–present ====
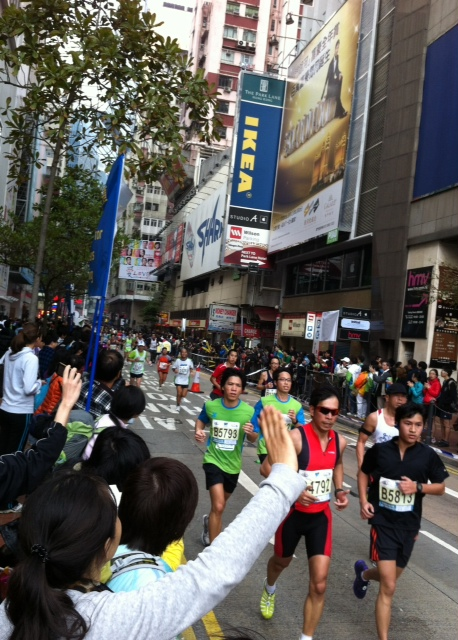
Near the Victoria Park finish, 2012

The 2010 race saw Cyprian Kiogara Mwobi become the first man to defend his title in Hong Kong, and only the second person to do so after Yuko Gordon won the women's races in 1983 and 1984.

At the 2011 edition, held on 20 February, Nelson Kirwa Rotich won the men's elite race in a time of 2:16.00 hours. However, it was the women's elite race that proved to be the high point of that year's events: young Kenyan runner Janet Rono failed to gain a position within the invited foreign athletes and she chose to fund her own journey and participation for the event. The move paid off as she won the race in a new women's course record time of 2:33:42, erasing Irina Bogachova's ten-year-old mark.

The route was modified in the 2012 race to pass through the Central Piers and the newly reclaimed areas around the Tamar site. Ethiopians set new course records for both men's and women's races: Dejere Abera for the men's record with 2:11:27 hours and Misiker Demissie for the women's record with 2:30:12 hours. The wheelchair race was resumed after 14 years of hiatus, with full marathon and 3 km courses. The second fatality in the competition's history occurred that year, when a 26-year-old male half marathon runner fell unconscious after he passed the finish line, and announced dead after he was sent to hospital.

The 2013 edition was held on 23 February and Julius Maisei (2:14:18) and Misiker Demissie (2:30:49) won the elite races.

The 2014 races were won by two Ethiopian athletes who self-funded to enter the race. Feyera Gemeda and Rehima Kedir won the men's and women's races in 2:15:05 and 2:34:53 hours, respectively.

A 24-year-old male Ng Cheuk-yue from the 2015 race died of an unknown cause in a hospital after a heart attack and then head injury just one hundred metres away from the finish line. A 49-year-old male runner is currently in a hospital after falling ill at the Tsing Ma Bridge. Ethiopian runner Sentayehu Merga Ejigu won the men's race with two hours, thirteen minutes, and forty-six seconds; North Korean runner Kim Hye-gyong won the woman's race with two hours, thirty-one minutes, and forty-six seconds. Thirty more people were hospitalised: three serious, nineteen stable, and eight discharged.

The (20th) Hong Kong Marathon (2016) had the first Official Theme Song of the race - Life And Marathon sung by Hong Kong singer Eason Chan, being recorded on his newest album Getting Ready (準備中) released on 10 July 2015, and Eason was formally invited to participate on this race with being granted "Standard Chartered Hong Kong Marathon VIP Pass" by Standard Chartered Bank and Hong Kong Amateur Athletic Association.

The 2017 course omitted the Tsing Ma Bridge due to complaints by motorists. After omitting it again in 2018, race organizers stated that it was unlikely to ever return to the marathon course.

In 2019, a new course record of 2:09:21 was set by Barnabas Kiptum.

The 2020 edition originally scheduled in February was cancelled due to the COVID-19 pandemic.

Similarly, the 2021 edition of the race, originally scheduled for January, was postponed to 24 October 2021 due to the pandemic. The marathon was won by Christy Yiu and Wong Kai-lok, both from Hong Kong. Wong won by four seconds in his debut marathon, which he ran against the advice of his doctors, after having taken two years to recover from a serious knee injury. As this was the first edition of the race held since the pandemic began, the number of participants was reduced by about 75 percent, and no overseas runners were invited. As this was also the first edition held since the implementation of the Hong Kong National Security Law, runners were warned against making political statements, and some runners reported being banned from the race due to wearing apparel containing the words "Hong Kong". (Note: During a press conference with marathon organisers, one media representative asked if the race was going to be renamed "Standard Chartered Marathon", dropping the words "Hong Kong".)At the time, the Commissioner for Sports was Yang Deqiang.

== Course ==
=== Standard Chartered era ===
External images
- Course map of full marathon in 2019
- Course map of full marathon in 2021

The course initially used in 1997 ran from Sheung Shui to Shenzhen via Huanggang.

The marathon begins on Nathan Road in Tsim Sha Tsui, crosses Stonecutters and Ting Kau Bridges, then runs through Cheung Tsing and Western Harbour Tunnels before finishing in Victoria Park.

The Tsing Ma Bridge was added to the course in 1998 but was removed in 2017 due to complaints by motorists.

== Winners ==
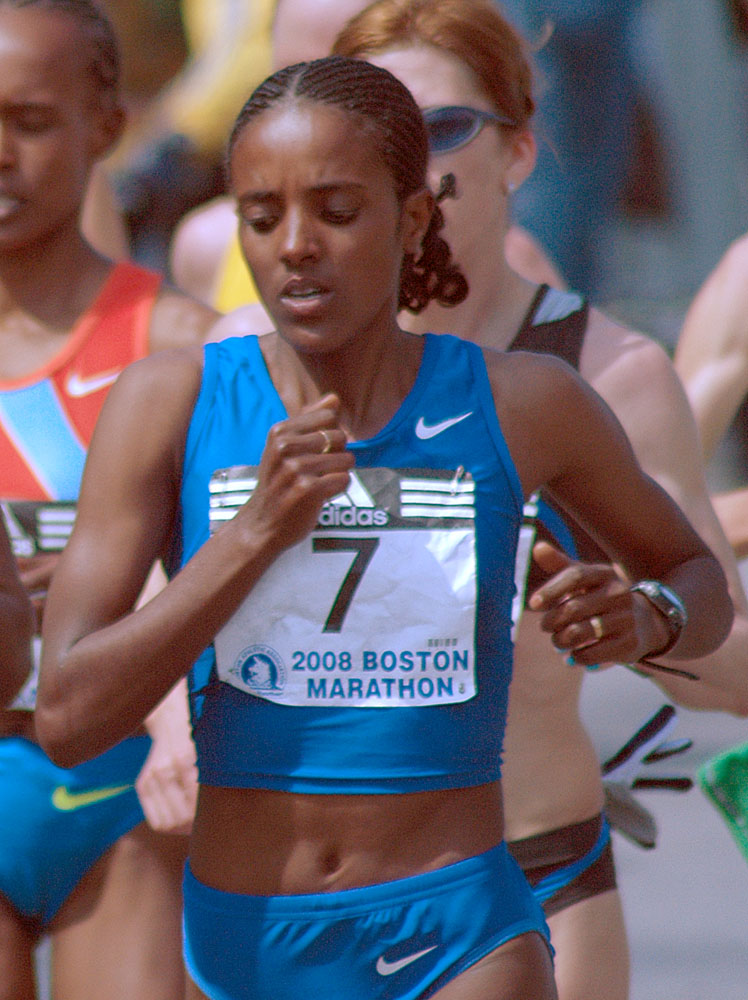
2006 winner Ethiopian Dire Tune (pictured running the 2008 Boston Marathon, which she won)

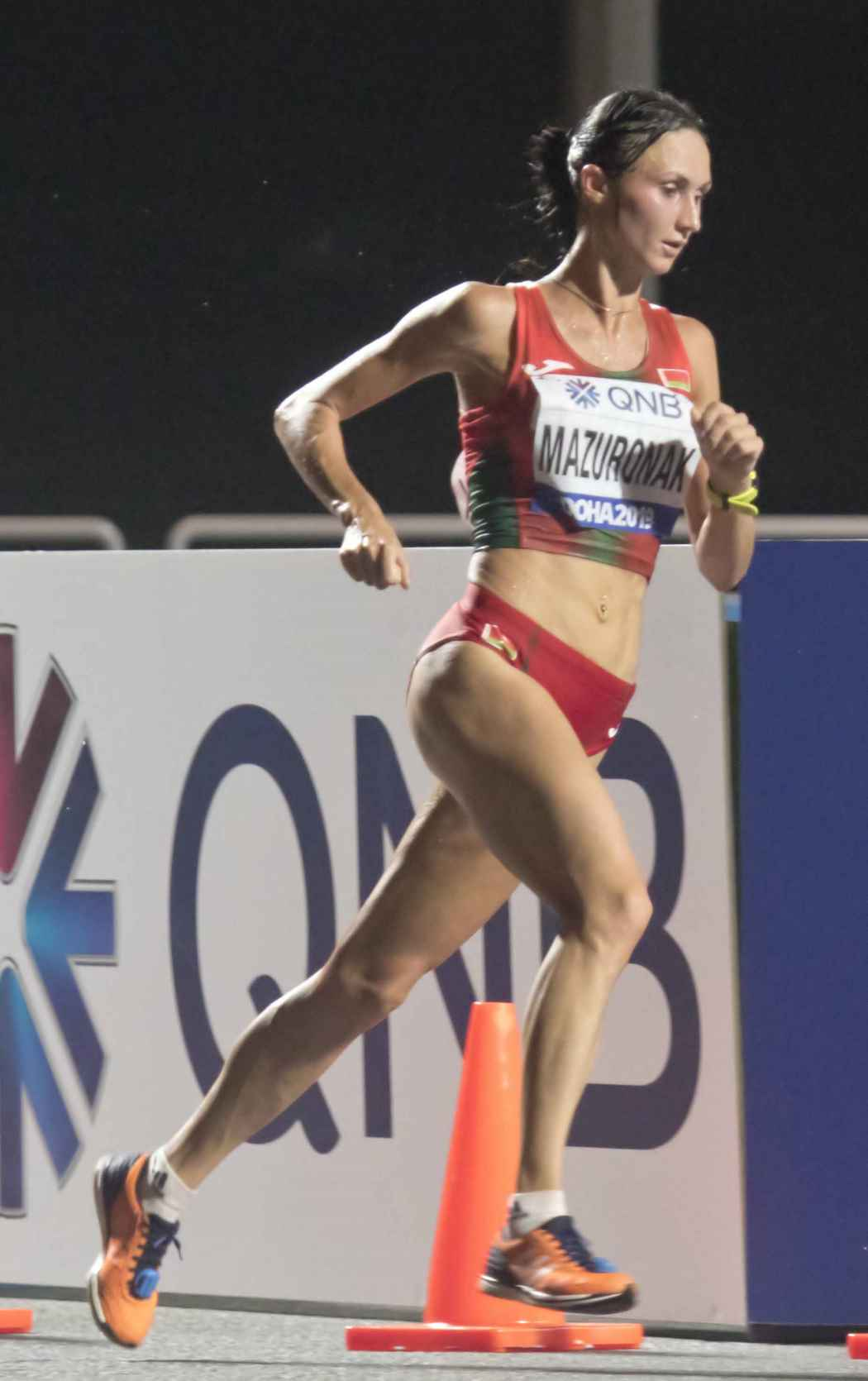
Course record holder Volha Mazuronak (pictured here Women's marathon in Doha

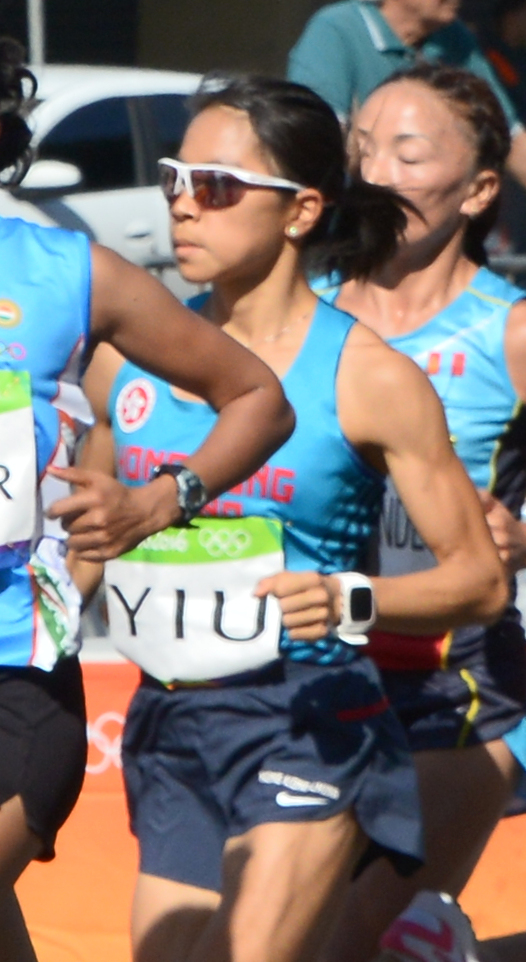
2021 winner Christy Yiu (pictured here Women's marathon in Rio de Janeiro

Key:

Course record (in bold)
Asian Marathon Championship race

=== Initial era ===
Year	Men's winner	Time	Women's winner	Time	Rf.
1981	Yoshinobu Kitayama (JPN)	2:19:43	Kathryn Binns (GBR)	2:45:38	
1982	Andy Holden (GBR)	2:17:43	Winnie Lai-Chu Ng (HKG)	2:50:09	
1983	James Dingwall (GBR)	2:15:48	Yuko Gordon (HKG)	2:48:08	
1984	Graeme Kennedy (AUS)	2:17:27	Yuko Gordon (HKG)	2:42:35	
1985	Alain Lazare (NCL)	2:18:34	Asha Agarwal (IND)	2:44:51	
1986	Shu-chun Zhu (CHN)	2:15:08	Yan-min Wen (CHN)	2:36:55	
1987	Richard Mannen (CAN)	2:20:51	Ju-an Li (CHN)	2:37:35	
1988	Cai Shang-yan (CHN)	2:23:27	Xiu-xia Li (CHN)	2:41:31	
—	suspended from 1989 to 1991				
1992	Pan Shao-kui (CHN)	2:20:54	Hong Wang (CHN)	2:45:44	
1993	Peter Handcock (NZL)	2:18:34	Zina Marchant (GBR)	2:41:20	
—	suspended from 1994 to 1996				

=== Standard Chartered era ===
Ed.	Year	Men's winner	Time	Women's winner	Time	Rf.
1	1997	Nicholas Kioko (KEN) (Note: The official race site has previously listed Bashir Hussain of the United Kingdom and Bev Lucas of Australia as the winners in 1997 (with winning times of 2:25:34 and 2:52:07, respectively), even though they are well documented as the winners of the Swire Group Tsing Ma Bridge Marathon (with those winning times), held on 4 May 1997 after the bridge was inaugurated on 27 April 1997, while the Standard Chartered marathon was held on 16 February 1997, ran from Sheung Shui to Shenzhen via Huanggang, and never crossed the bridge.)	2:16:13	Zheng Guixia (CHN)	2:31:33	
2	1998	Belaye Wolashe (ETH)	2:13:09	Alina Ivanova (RUS)	2:39:26	
3	1999	Charles Tangus (KEN)	2:17:00	Zheng Guixia (CHN)	2:36:52	
4	2000	Henry Cherono (KEN)	2:21:09	Irina Safarova (RUS)	2:46:59	
5	2001	Dube Jillo (ETH)	2:23:21	Irina Bogacheva (KGZ)	2:33:43	
6	2002	Benjamin Mutua (KEN)	2:16:07	Zhang Shujing (CHN)	2:36:27	
7	2003	Tendai Chimusasa (ZIM)	2:18:11	Sun Weiwei (CHN)	2:38:55	
8	2004	Thomas Migwi (KEN)	2:17:17	Gitte Karlshøj (DEN)	2:42:19	
9	2005	Samson Loywapet (KEN)	2:15:21	Dai Yanyan (CHN)	2:34:41	
10	2006	Simon Kipruto (KEN)	2:14:18	Dire Tune (ETH)	2:35:15	
11	2007	Steven Kamar (KEN)	2:17:03	Rose Nyangacha (KEN)	2:38:19	
12	2008	Koichiro Fukuoka (JPN)	2:16:50	Kim Kum-ok (PRK)	2:36:43	
13	2009	Cyprian Mwobi (KEN)	2:14:57	Winfrida Kwamboka (KEN)	2:41:25	
14	2010	Cyprian Mwobi (KEN)	2:20:12	Triyaningsih (INA)	2:47:35	
15	2011	Nelson Rotich (KEN)	2:16:00	Janet Rono (KEN)	2:33:42	
16	2012	Dejere Abera (ETH)	2:11:27	Misiker Demissie (ETH)	2:30:12	
17	2013	Julius Masei (KEN)	2:14:18	Misiker Demissie (ETH)	2:30:49	
18	2014	Feyera Gemeda (ETH)	2:15:05	Rehima Kedir (ETH)	2:34:53	
19	2015	Sentayehu Merga (ETH)	2:13:00	Kim Hye-gyong (PRK)	2:31:46	
20	2016	Mike Mutai (KEN)	2:12:12	Letebrhan Gebreslasea (ETH)	2:36:51	
21	2017	Melaku Belachew (ETH)	2:10:31	Gulume Tollesa (ETH)	2:33:39	
22	2018	Kenneth Mungara (KEN)	2:13:39	Gulume Tollesa (ETH)	2:29:37	
23	2019	Barnabas Kiptum (KEN)	**2:09:20**	Volha Mazuronak (BLR)	**2:26:13**	
—	2020	cancelled due to the coronavirus pandemic				
24	2021	Wong Kai-lok (HKG)	2:31:10	Christy Yiu (HKG)	2:39:27	
—	2022	cancelled due to the coronavirus pandemic				
25	2023	Philimon Kipchumba (KEN)	2:10:47	Sinke Biyadgilgn (ETH)	2:34:46	
26	2024	Anderson Seroi (KEN)	2:12:50	Medina Armino (ETH)	2:28:47	
27	2025	Bethwell Kipkemboi (KEN)	2:11:13	Volha Mazuronak (BLR)	2:27:00	

== See also ==
- Beijing Marathon
- Macau Marathon
