= State opportunism =

- Initiator: Yang Xiaokai
- meaning: the absence or only ostensibly fair political game rules and legal systems

State opportunism
- Simplified Chinese: 国家机会主义
- Traditional Chinese: 國家機會主義
Transcriptions
Standard Mandarin
- Hanyu Pinyin: Guójiā jīhuì zhǔyì

State opportunism (simplified Chinese: 国家机会主义; traditional Chinese: 國家機會主義), also known as national pragmatism, is a viewpoint put forward by Yang Xiaokai. It refers to an "institutionalized" market-oriented economic system where the ruling class does selfish things in the name of public good and is rampant corruption, and where there is no constitutional order. It means, on the one hand, rent-setting and corruption, and, more advancedly, the monopoly of economic resources by elite groups.

Yang pointed out that opportunism means cheating, and it is very prevalent in China. The cheating of individual households is only a small matter, the real problem is the cheating of the government. The policy is different between the first day and the 15th day, which is state opportunism. In addition to the collusion of government officials and entrepreneurs, political monopoly, among others, one of the most obvious features of the state opportunism is the unfair income distribution. He further noted that under the political monopoly of the ruling party, the economic transition would be hijacked by the state opportunism.

Compared with the individual opportunism or small group opportunism, state opportunism is more concealed. Because it often acts under the banner of serving the national interest and the interests of the people, its purpose seems to be for the general public.

== Solution ==
Yang Xiaokai argues that in order to curb the state opportunism, late-development countries should first reform their constitutional systems and establish Anglo-American-style constitutional systems.
