= Hong Kong at the 2009 World Championships in Athletics =

- WA code: HKG
- National federation: Hong Kong Amateur Athletic Association
- Website: www.hkaaa.com

in Berlin
- Competitors: 1
- Medals: Gold 0 Silver 0 Bronze 0 Total 0

World Championships in Athletics appearances
- 1983; 1987; 1991; 1993; 1995; 1997; 1999; 2001; 2003; 2005; 2007; 2009; 2011; 2013; 2015; 2017; 2019; 2022; 2023; 2025

Hong Kong competed at the 2009 World Championships in Athletics from 15–23 August in Berlin.

== Team performance ==
- 100 m (first round heats)
  - (Heat 12) Chi Ho Tsui—Lane 5, -- 10.77s (Rank 6) -- Did not qualify
