= Hong Kong at the 2022 World Athletics Championships =

Hong Kong at the 2022 World Championships in Athletics
- Flag of the Hong Kong
- WA code: HKG

in Eugene, Oregon 15–24 July 2022
- Competitors: 1
- Medals: Gold 0 Silver 0 Bronze 0 Total 0

World Championships in Athletics appearances
- 1983; 1987; 1991; 1993; 1995; 1997; 1999; 2001; 2003; 2005; 2007; 2009; 2011; 2013; 2015; 2017; 2019; 2022; 2023; 2025

Hong Kong competed at the 2022 World Athletics Championships in Eugene, United States, from 15 to 24 July 2022.

== Results ==
Hong Kong entered 1 athlete.

=== Women ===
Track and road events

Athlete	Event	Final	
Athlete	Event	Result	Rank
Kit Ching Yiu	Marathon	2:43:13	29
