= Life Marathon =

Single by Eason Chan

from the album Getting Ready（《準備中》）
- Released: July 10, 2015
- Recorded: 2015
- Genre: Cantonese Pop
- Length: 4:44
- Label: Cinepoly Records
- Songwriter(s): Calvin Poon
- Producer(s): Jim Lee

"Life Marathon" (Chinese: 人生馬拉松) is the official theme song of the 20th (2016) Hong Kong Marathon, sung by Eason Chan. The song was included on Chan's 2015 album Getting Ready. Chan was formally invited to participate in this race when he was granted a Standard Chartered Hong Kong Marathon VIP Pass by Standard Chartered Bank and Hong Kong Amateur Athletic Association. Written by Poon Yuen Leung, the lyrics encourage people to rise to the challenges by comparing life to a Marathon.

The music video included a number of well-known Hong Kong runners, including Ip Lun Ming (an experienced elderly runner, a survivor of the Tai Ping Incident, who died in 2014) and Hilary Tsui (spouse of Eason Chan, known for participating in the Full Marathon in recent years).

The song received good airplay on Hong Kong radio channels, including FM 90.3, Metro Radio Hong Kong and RTHK.
