= Kai Tak Sports Park =

Sports stadium in Kowloon, Hong Kong

Coordinates: 22.3225°N 114.1971°E

- 啟德體育園

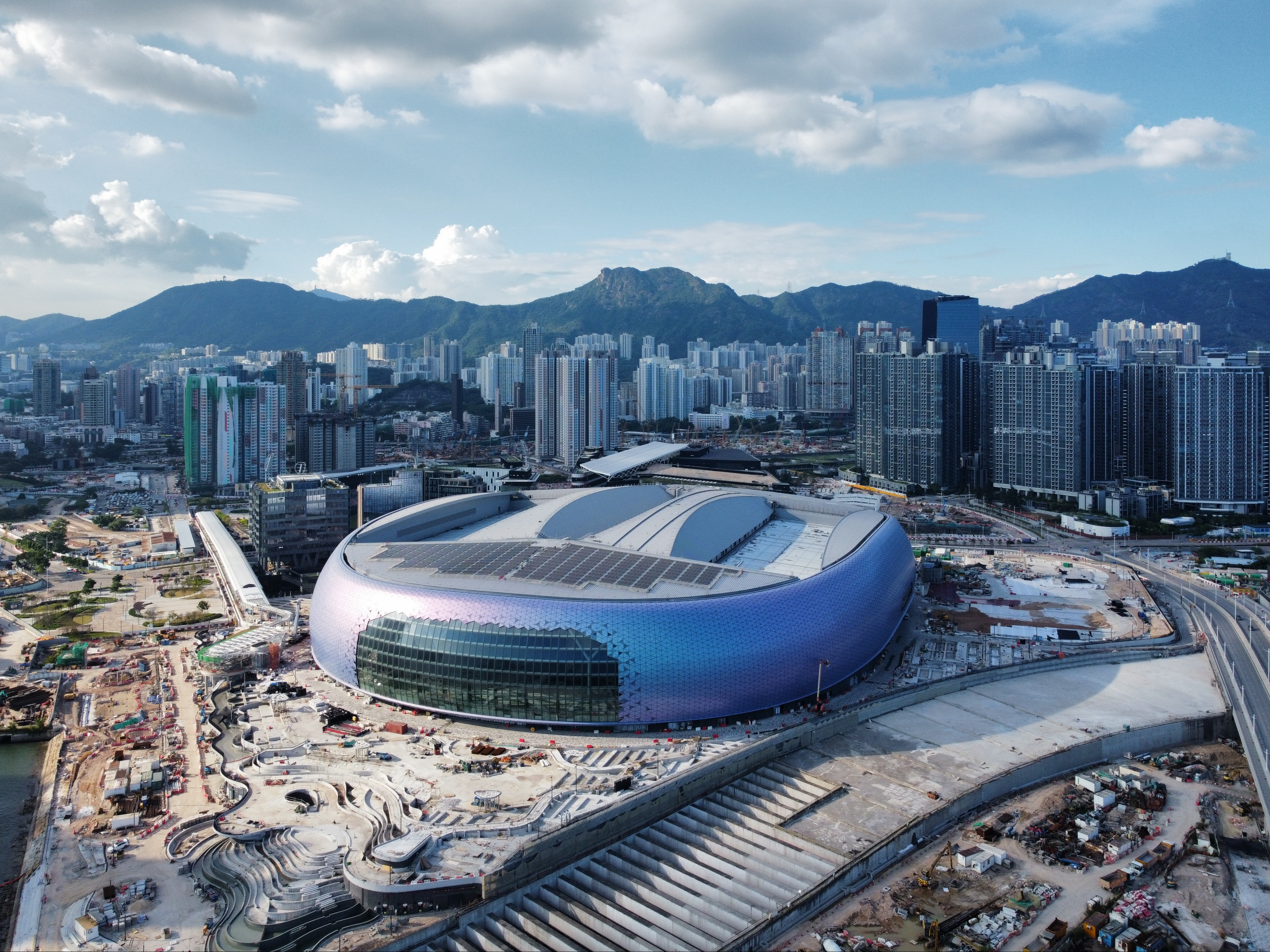
- Kai Tak Sports Park in 2024
- Interactive map of Kai Tak Sports Park
- Address: 38–39 Shing Kai Road, Kai Tak, Kowloon; Hong Kong
- Location: Kai Tak, Kowloon
- Operator: Kai Tak Sports Park Limited
- Capacity: 50,000 (Kai Tak Stadium); 10,000 (Kai Tak Main Arena); 300 (Kai Tak Ancillary Arena); 5,000 (Kai Tak Youth Sports Ground)
- Executive suites: 57
- Roof: Retractable
- Record attendance: Football: 49,975 (Arsenal vs Tottenham Hotspur, 31 July 2025); Rugby: 41,457 (2026 Hong Kong Sevens, 18 April 2026); Concert: 45,995 (Coldplay, April 2025)
- Acreage: 28 hectares
- Public transit: Kai Tak Station Exit D Sung Wong Toi Station Exit D Kai Tak Sports Park Bus Stop Kowloon City Ferry Pier

Construction
- Groundbreaking: 23 April 2019
- Opened: 1 March 2025
- Cost: HK$30 billion (US$3.8 billion)
- Architect: Populous
- Main contractor: Hip Hing Engineering

Tenants
- Hong Kong national football team Kowloon City (Youth Sports Ground)

Website
- www.kaitaksportspark.com.hk

Kai Tak Sports Park
- Traditional Chinese: 啟德體育園
- Simplified Chinese: 启德体育园
- Cantonese Yale: Káidāk tai yuk yūan
Transcriptions
Standard Mandarin
- Hanyu Pinyin: Qǐdé Tǐyù Yuán
Yue: Cantonese
- Yale Romanization: Káidāk tai yuk yūan
- Jyutping: kai2 dak1 tai2 juk6 jyun4

Kai Tak Sports Park is a multi-purpose sports, entertainment and leisure precinct on the site of the former Kai Tak Airport in Kowloon, Hong Kong, as part of the Kai Tak Development project. The venue is located to the northwest of the old Kai Tak Airport, on the old car park. With an approximate area of 28 hectares, Kai Tak Sports Park is the largest sports venue in Hong Kong. The site anchors the redevelopment of the former airport site, and is intended to support the future sports development of Hong Kong.

South China Morning Post initially reported that the park would be finished by 2023, but it was not completed until 2024 due to a shortage of resources. The venue contains the Kai Tak Stadium, which holds 50,000 people at its maximum capacity along with a retractable roof, a 10,000-seat Kai Tak Arena and a 5,000-seat Public Sports Ground.

The venue officially opened to the public on 1 March 2025. The first musical event to take place at the venue was Coldplay's Music of the Spheres World Tour, with four shows held from 8–12 April 2025. The performances attracted 183,980 attendees in total.

== Development ==
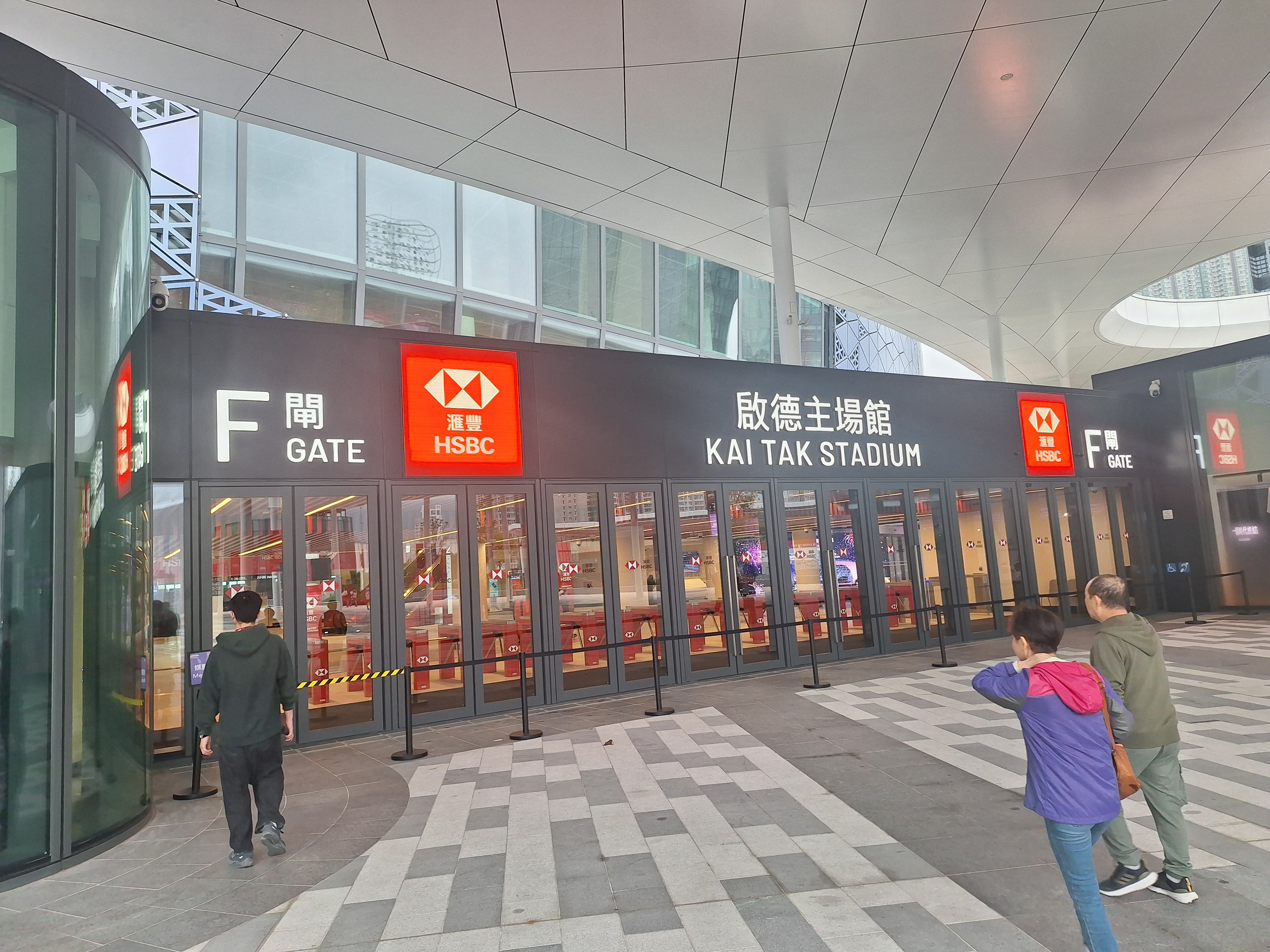
Entrance of the Kai Tak Stadium

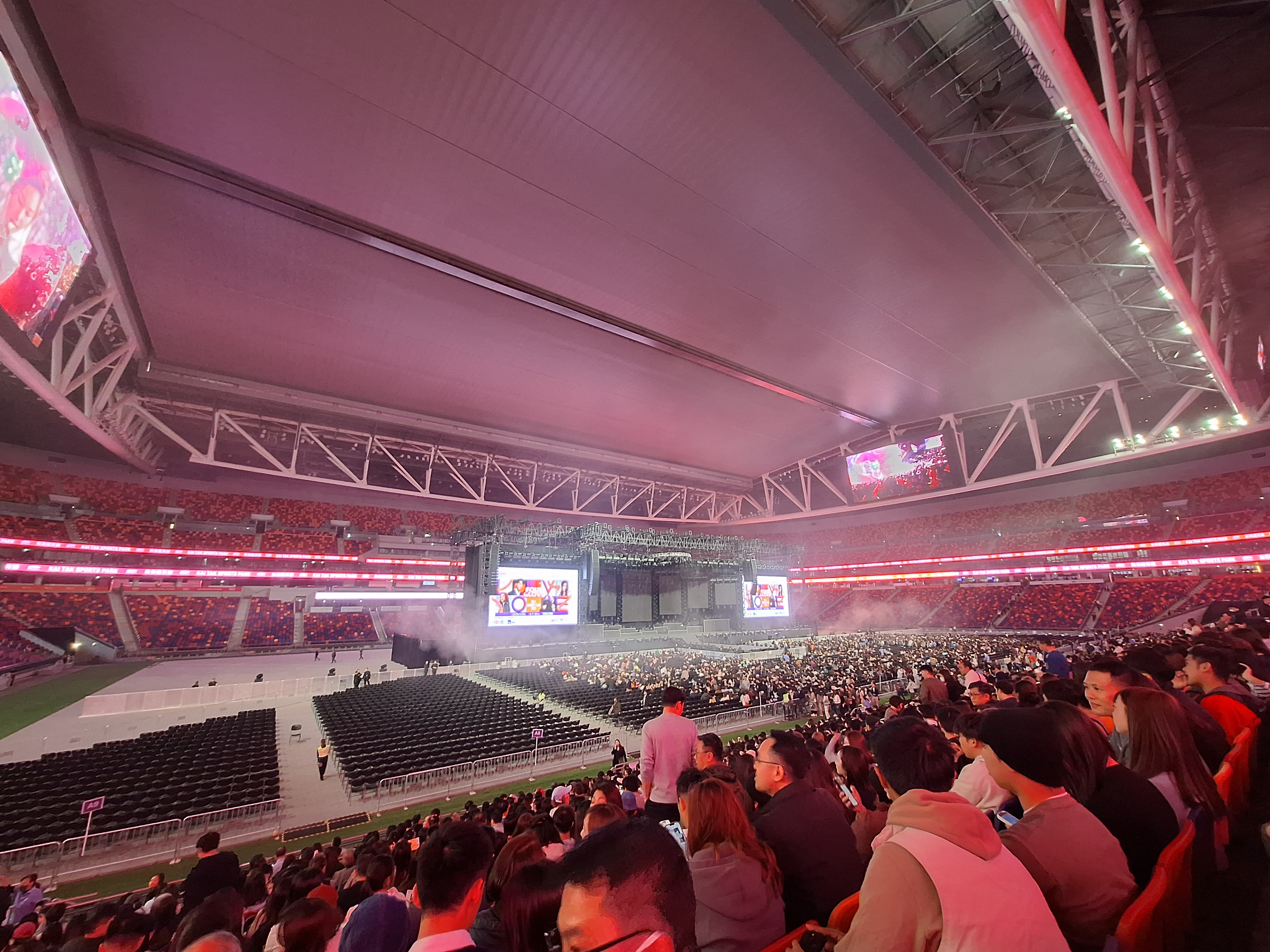
Interior of the Kai Tak Stadium as concert venue

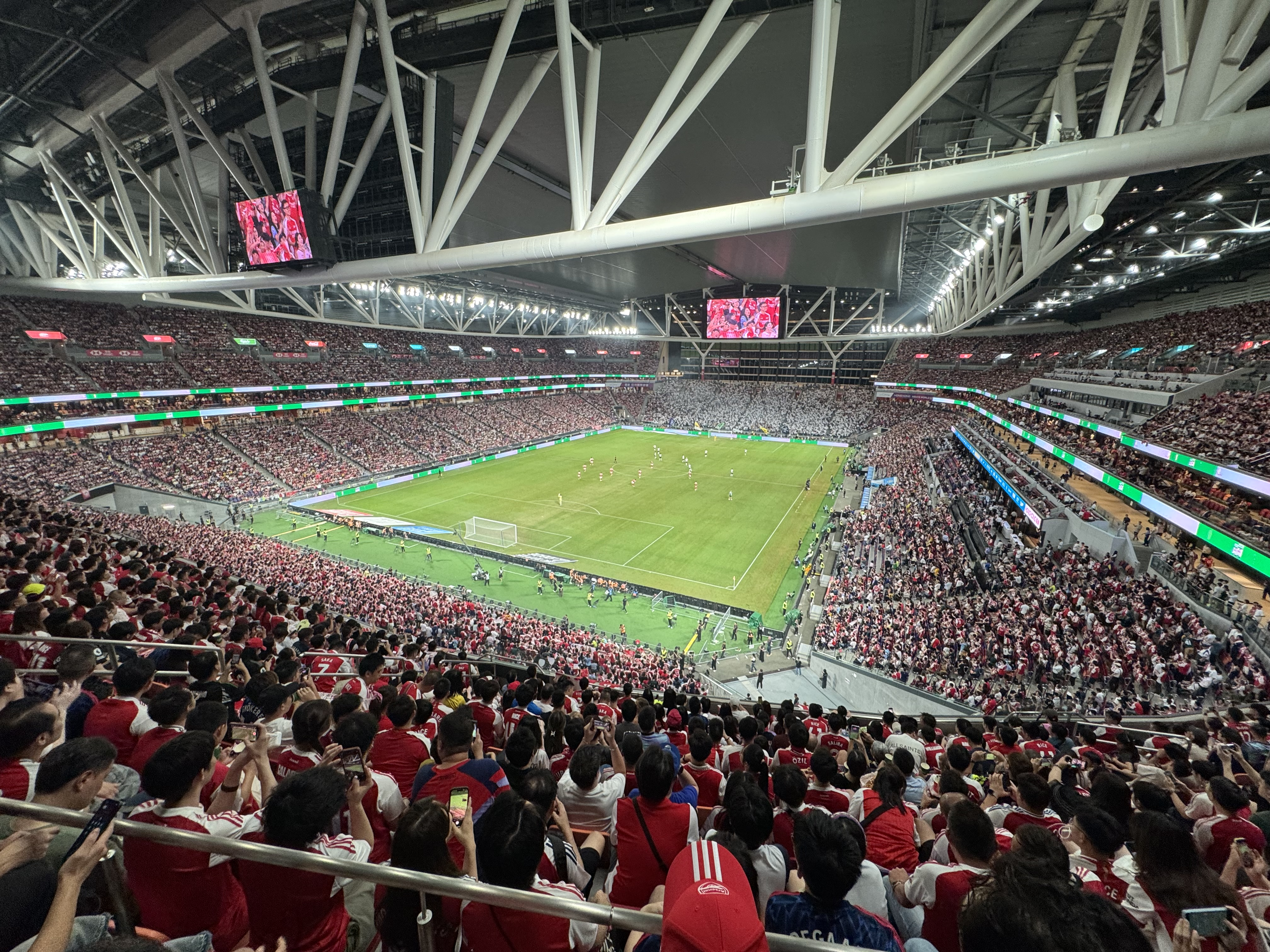
Interior of the Kai Tak Stadium as sports venue

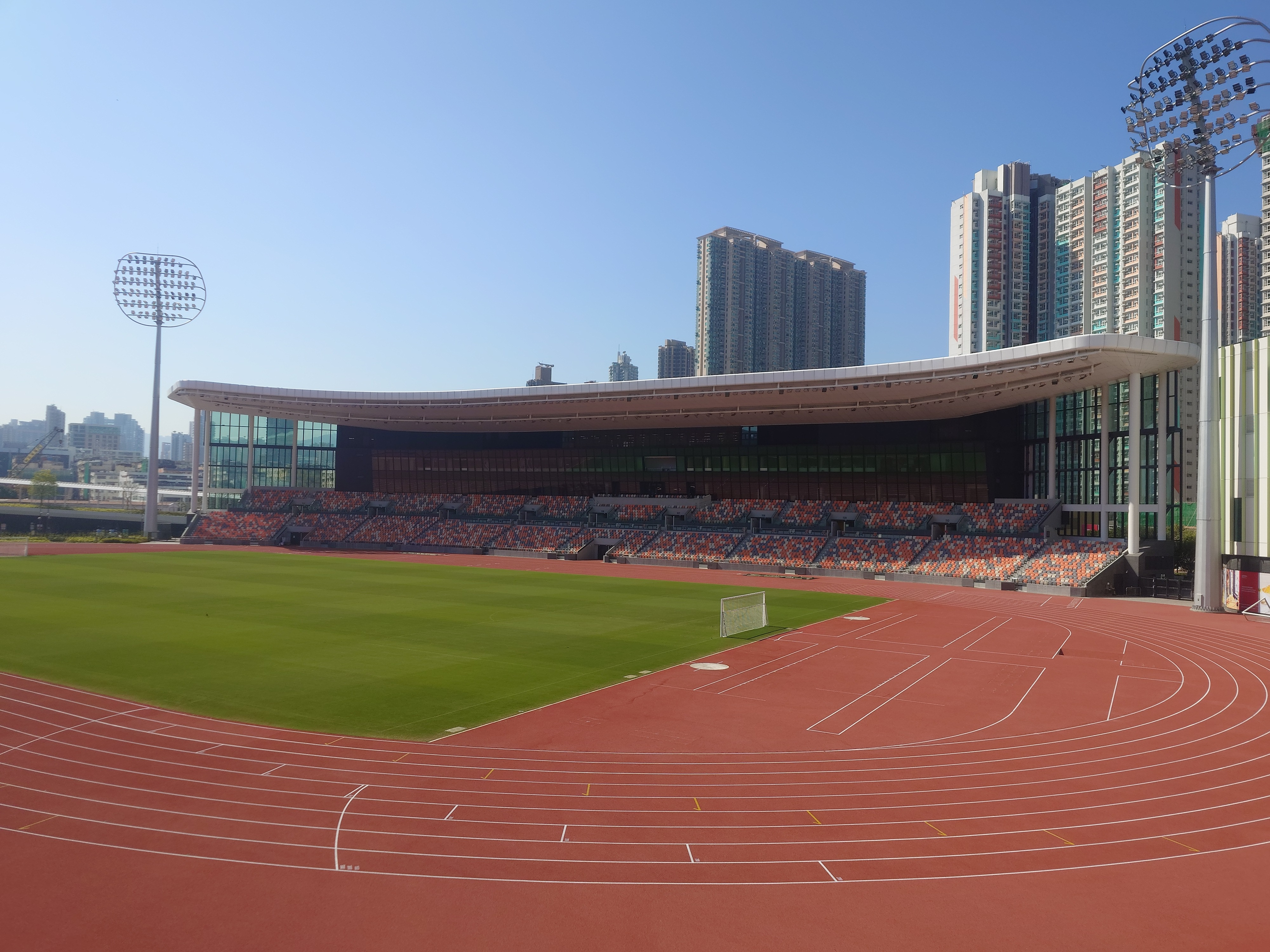
Kai Tak Youth Sports Ground

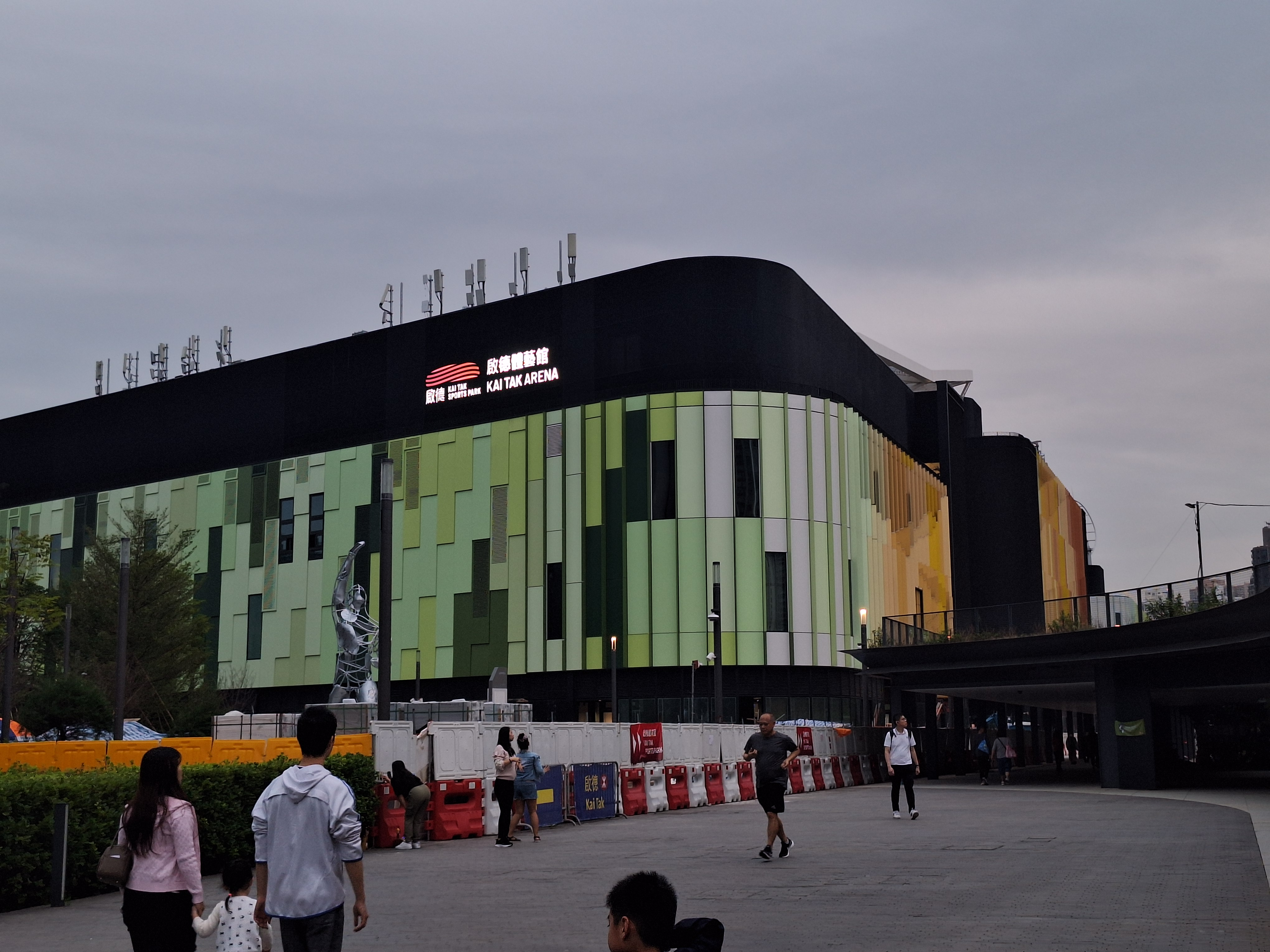
Kai Tak Arena

American engineering firm AECOM was engaged by the Civil Engineering and Development Department to undertake the Kai Tak Development project in early 2007. In the 2011–12 policy address delivered by Hong Kong Chief Executive Donald Tsang, he stated that the government is studying financing options and mode of operation of the proposed multi-purpose stadium complex at Kai Tak and will start the preliminary work as soon as possible.

On 5 November 2012, the Home Affairs Bureau completed an initial technical feasibility study of the Kai Tak multi-purpose complex and submitted it to the Legislative Council. In the study, the bureau proposed a "design-build-operate" approach – design, construction, operations and maintenance under a single entity – to ensure effective delivery from designing the complex to its long-term operation. The study also recommended that the project be financially supported by a combination of government and private financing in order to maximize efficiency and innovation. The stadium will have a retractable roof and a capacity of 50,000 for international sports and entertainment events. The facilities were proposed to be completed by 2020.

HK$62.7 million in pre-construction funds for the Kai Tak Multi-purpose Sports Complex was approved by the Legislative Council Finance Committee members on 3 July 2015.

On 23 June 2017, the Hong Kong legislators in the finance committee granted cash for the HK$31.9 billion sports complex in Kai Tak after a six-hour debate. 36 lawmakers green-lit the sports park, with 21 voting against it.

On 28 December 2018, the government announced that the contract for the design, construction and operation of the Kai Tak Sports Park would be handed over to Kai Tak Sports Park Limited, a subsidiary of New World Development and NWS Holdings established specifically for the project. At the time, the Commissioner for Sports was Yang Deqiang.

The groundbreaking ceremony of the Kai Tak Sports Park was held on 23 April 2019.

=== Project team ===
Kai Tak Sports Park's project team members include Hip Hing Engineering, Populous, ASM Global and Lagardère Sports and Entertainment. Hip Hing Engineering is the main contractor of the project supported by Populous, Robert Bird Group, SKA, ADI Limited, and Arup as design team.

=== Schedule and penalties ===
The government has imposed strict performance indicators for the Kai Tak Sports Park with a penalty of HK$500,000 for every day if the operator fails to meet usage requirements in the main stadium, HK$100,000 for the indoor centre and HK$50,000 for the public ground accordingly. The time for operational acceptance is 1,640 days (54 months) from the commencement of the contract (1 February 2019). This means that the park should be finished by June 2023.

In June 2022, the Commissioner for Sports, Yeung Tak-keung, blamed the COVID-19 pandemic for the delay in opening dates to 2024, saying suppliers had faced difficulties in shipping construction materials to the territory, he added that the contractor won't be penalised for the delay, as no one could have foreseen the COVID-19 pandemic when the contract was signed in 2019.

== Facilities ==
Kai Tak Sports Park is designed around a covered Kai Tak Sports Avenue, an indoor and outdoor pedestrian walkway starting at the Station Square (the connection to the park linking new MTR stops Kai Tak station and Sung Wong Toi station) and takes people all the way to the Dining Cove overlooking the Victoria Harbourfront.

The main stadium has flexible pitch system which can be switched between natural turf for premier football or rugby events, to other surfaces for a variety of sports, entertainment, and community events. The facility has been designed to meet the standards of major international events with customisable staging and seating configurations that cater to various events and crowd sizes.

The sports park's Indoor Sports Center provides a large multi-purpose space with retractable seating to host major competitions or events of up to 10,000 seats and to accommodate sports courts for community use. A 5,000 seat Public Sports Ground is also provided for hosting school athletic events, athletic training and local league games.

Other facilities include more than 8 hectares of open spaces, outdoor ball courts, a children's playground, a health and wellness center, a bowling center and retail and dining outlets. An event village will also be built to house international athletes visiting from other regions and countries.

== Transportation ==
The sports park is accessible from the Kai Tak station and the Sung Wong Toi station on the Tuen Ma line, as well as to the Kowloon City Ferry Pier, Central Kowloon Route and many neighbouring bus stops.

Tuen Ma line

== Notable events ==
=== Sports ===
Hong Kong co-hosted the 2025 National Games of China with Guangdong and Macau, with the Kai Tak Sports Park as part of the hosting venues. The stadium hosted rugby sevens, and the arenas hosted men's handball, fencing and bowling.

Kai Tak Arena hosted the preliminary round of 2025 FIVB Women's Volleyball Nations League in June 2025.

==== Football ====
In December 2024, Kai Tak Sports Park hosted the group match of 2025 EAFF E-1 Football Championship Preliminary competition between Guam and Macau.

The first football match to be held at the main stadium was the 2027 AFC Asian Cup qualification between Hong Kong and India on 10 June 2025. All tickets were sold out a day before the match.

Kai Tak Sports Park then hosted pre-season friendly matches between Liverpool and Milan on 26 July 2025 (in a rematch of the iconic 2005 and 2007 UEFA Champions League finals) as well as the North London derby between Arsenal and Tottenham Hotspur on 31 July 2025, the first outside England.

Since 2026–27 Hong Kong Premier League season, Kowloon City District SA played their home games at Kai Tak Youth Sports Ground. The stadium also hosted the inaugural FIFA ASEAN Cup Division 2 in Autumn 2026.

Notable football events held at Kai Tak Sports Park
Date	Home (Team 1)	Result	Away (Team 2)	Event	Attendance	Main Stadium	Youth Sports Ground	Sold out
2024
14 December	Macau	1–2	Guam	2025 EAFF E-1 Football Championship Preliminary competition	534		✔	
2025
10 June	Hong Kong	1–0	India	2027 AFC Asian Cup qualification	42,570	✔		✔
24 July	—			(England) Liverpool open training	27,306	✔		
26 July	Liverpool (England)	2–4	(Italy) AC Milan	Exhibition game	49,704	✔		
29 July	—			(England) Tottenham Hotspur open training	9,080	✔		
30 July	—			(England) Arsenal open training	18,563	✔		
31 July	Arsenal (England)	0–1	(England) Tottenham Hotspur	Exhibition game	49,975	✔		✔
14 October	Hong Kong	1–1	Bangladesh	2027 AFC Asian Cup qualification	45,489	✔		✔
18 October	Liverpool Legends (England)	4–2	(England) Manchester United Legends	Exhibition game	27,081	✔		
25 October	Hong Kong women	5–0	Malaysia women	International friendly	1,332		✔	
18 November	Hong Kong	1–2	Singapore	2027 AFC Asian Cup qualification	47,762	✔		✔
2026
6 June	Hong Kong women	3–1	Fiji women	International friendly	1,261		✔	
31 July	—			(England) Manchester City open training	20,000	✔		
1 August	Manchester City (England)	1–1 (1–3 (p))	(Italy) Inter Milan	Exhibition game	42,826	✔		
4 August	—			(England) Chelsea open training	16,000	✔		
5 August	Chelsea (England)	0–1	(Italy) Juventus	Exhibition game	43,575	✔		
6 August	—			(Germany) Bayern Munich open training		✔		
7 August	Bayern Munich (Germany)	2–1	(England) Aston Villa	Exhibition game	38,176	✔		
27 September	Hong Kong	4–0	Laos	2026 FIFA ASEAN Challenge Cup group stage	18,873	✔		
27 September	Cambodia	1–0	Myanmar	2026 FIFA ASEAN Challenge Cup group stage		✔		
30 September	Timor-Leste	2–2	Cambodia	2026 FIFA ASEAN Challenge Cup group stage		✔		
30 September	Brunei	0–2	Hong Kong	2026 FIFA ASEAN Challenge Cup group stage	20,116	✔		
3 October	Hong Kong	2–0	Cambodia	2026 FIFA ASEAN Challenge Cup final	31,374	✔		
30 October	Kowloon City	2–2	Rangers	2026–27 Hong Kong Premier League	1,768		✔	
7 November	Sha Tin	1–1	Rangers	2026–27 Hong Kong Premier League	4,593		✔	✔
2027
1 May		–		2026–27 Hong Kong League Cup final			✔	

==== Rugby ====
Kai Tak Youth Sports Ground hosted its first rugby match in November 2024, where Hong Kong beat Brazil with a score of 38–17. The main stadium hosted its first annual Hong Kong Sevens in 2025. Over 110,000 fans attended the three-day tournament. This was bettered slightly in the 50th anniversary with just over 113,000 fans showing up in 2026.

Notable rugby events held at Kai Tak Sports Park
Date	Home (Team 1)	Result	Away (Team 2)	Event	Attendance	Main Stadium	Youth Sports Ground
2024
16 November	Hong Kong	38–17	Brazil	Test match			✔
2025
28–30 March	—			2025 Hong Kong Sevens	139,000	✔	
22 June	Hong Kong	78–7	Sri Lanka	2025 Asia Rugby Emirates Men's Championship	2,305		✔
24 October	Hong Kong	14–59	Japan XV	Test match	7,702	✔	
2026
17–19 April	—			2026 Hong Kong Sevens	113,395	✔	
13 September	Spain Women	32–38	Fiji Women	2026 WXV Global Challenger Series	2,900		✔
13 September	Hong Kong Women	29–24	Brazil Women	2026 WXV Global Challenger Series	2,900		✔
13 September	Netherlands Women	70–0	Samoa Women	2026 WXV Global Challenger Series	2,900		✔
19 September	Samoa Women	21–59	Spain Women	2026 WXV Global Challenger Series	2,700		✔
19 September	Hong Kong Women	26–54	Fiji Women	2026 WXV Global Challenger Series	2,700		✔
19 September	Brazil Women	15–17	Netherlands Women	2026 WXV Global Challenger Series	2,700		✔
26 September	Fiji Women	20–17	Netherlands Women	2026 WXV Global Challenger Series	2,900		✔
26 September	Hong Kong Women	34–24	Samoa Women	2026 WXV Global Challenger Series	2,900		✔
21 November	Hong Kong Women	19–55	Tonga Women	Test match			✔
21 November	Hong Kong	19–55	Tonga	2026 World Rugby Nations Cup			✔
2027
9–11 April	—			2027 Hong Kong Sevens		✔	

==== Other sports ====
Notable sport events held at Kai Tak Arena
Date	Home (Team 1)	Result	Away (Team 2)	Event	Sold out
2025
4–9 March	—			2025 World Snooker Grand Prix	
18–22 June	—			2025 FIVB Women's Volleyball Nations League	
21–24 August	—			PPA Tour Asia Hong Kong Open 2025	
17 September	Hong Kong Bulls	87–88	Changsha Yongsheng	2025 NBL Finals	
19 September	Hong Kong Bulls	95–80	Changsha Yongsheng	2025 NBL Finals	
14–15 October	—			Ultimate Tennis Showdown	
2026
23 January	Hong Kong Bulls	87–69	Changsha Yongsheng	2025—26 NBL	✔
3–8 February	—			2026 World Snooker Grand Prix	
28 February – 1 March	—			2026 LCK Cup Finals	✔
19 April	Hong Kong Bulls	117–65	Shanghai Black Bird	2025—26 NBL Finals	
21 April	Hong Kong Bulls	99–72	Shanghai Black Bird	2025—26 NBL Finals	
8–12 July	—			2026 FIVB Women's Volleyball Nations League	
19–25 October	—			PPA Asia 1500 Hong Kong Slam 2026	
17–22 November	—			BWF World Tour Super 500 Hong Kong Open 2026	
9–13 December	—			WTT Finals 2026	

=== Concerts and performances ===
Notable concerts and performances held at Kai Tak Sports Park
Date	Artist	Event	Main Stadium	Arena	Sold out
2025
1 March	—	Grand Opening Ceremony	✔		✔
6 April	—	Chill Club Chart Award Presentation 24/25		✔	
8–9, 11–12 April	Coldplay	Music of the Spheres World Tour	✔		✔
24–27 April	Nicholas Tse	Evolution Nic Live	✔		✔
26 April	Jeong Sun Ah, Say My Name (group), Nicole Jung, Kim Jae-joong, Kim Junsu	Just Us Live		✔	
9–11, 13 May	Mayday	Mayday #5525 Live Tour	✔		✔
11 May	—	Midlife, Sing & Shine! 3		✔	
24–25 May	JJ Lin	JJ20 Final Lap World Tour	✔		✔
27–29 June	Jay Chou	Carnival World Tour	✔		✔
4–6 July	Tyson Yoshi	The Villain Live		✔	✔
15–17, 19–20 August	G.E.M.	I Am Gloria World Tour	✔		✔
30 August	NCT Dream	The Dream Show 4: Dream The Future	✔		
26–27 September	Kenny Kwan	The Endless Adventure		✔	✔
27–28 September	Seventeen	New_ World Tour	✔		✔
28–29 November	MAMA Awards	2025 MAMA Awards	✔		✔
6–7 December	TWICE	This Is For World Tour	✔		✔
19–21 December	Zerobaseone	HERE&NOW World Tour		✔	✔
31 December	Charlie Zhou	2025 SHENSHEN'S Concert Tour	✔		✔
2026
1 January	Charlie Zhou	2025 SHENSHEN'S Concert Tour	✔		✔
23–25 January	Disney on Ice	Magic in the Stars		✔	
24–26 January	Blackpink	Deadline World Tour	✔		✔
28 February – 1 March	Seventeen	New_ World Tour	✔		✔
7–8 March	Yoga Lin, Jer Lau, Justin Lo	《Katch the Moment》–TheMomentApart		✔	
13, 15 March	Stefanie Sun	Aut Nihilo World Tour	✔		✔
14 March	Pakho Chau	THE BLOOMING CHAPTER Fan Meeting 2026		✔	
21 March	—	Cantopop 321 Charity Concert		✔	
25, 27–29 March	Mayday	Mayday #5525 Live Tour	✔		
28 March	MJ116	MJ116 OGS World Tour		✔	
2 May	Tai Chi	Tai Chi 40th Anniversary World Tour		✔	
3–4 May	—	25+ EEG Family Concert	✔		
16–17 May	Sandy Lam	SANDY LAM RESONANCE : Reconstructed Hong Kong Exclusive	✔		✔
27–28 June	I-dle	Syncopation World Tour	✔		
10–12 July	Sammi Cheng	You and Mi World Tour Finale Thank You Show	✔		✔
23–26, 28–31 July, 1 August	Ian Chan	IAN CHAN: GROWTH: LIVE 2026		✔	
22–23 August	—	TMElive International Music Awards	✔		
4–6 September	Silence Wang	Age of Romance World Tour 2026	✔		
8, 10–13 September	—	CAVALLUNA – Gate to the Otherworld⁣		✔	
4 October	Mamamoo	4WARD World Tour		✔	✔
11–12 October	NCT 127	Neo City – The Redline		✔	✔
24–25, 30–31 October	The Weeknd	After Hours til Dawn Tour	✔		✔
13–15, 17 November	BIGBANG	XX: Cosmos World Tour	✔		✔
5 December	Stray Kids	Run It World Tour	✔		
20 December	Jason Zhang	FUTURE·LIVE: Since 1982 Concert Tour	✔		
31 December	Aaron Kwok	Iconic Moment Concert	✔		
2027
1 January	Aaron Kwok	Iconic Moment Concert	✔		
18–19, 22–24 January	Joey Yung	Aura Tour	✔		✔
29–31 January	Disney on Ice	Let's Dance!		✔	
4, 6–7 March	BTS	Arirang World Tour	✔		✔
21–22 April	Charlie Puth	Whatever's Clever! World Tour		✔	
7–8, 11–12 May	Bruno Mars	The Romantic Tour	✔		
28–30 May	Sammi Cheng	You and Mi World Tour Finale	✔		✔
TBC	Post Malone	Big Ass Stadium Tour	✔		

== See also ==
- Kai Tak Airport
- Kai Tak Development
- Kowloon Walled City
- Lion Rock
- Lung Tsun Stone Bridge
- Sport in Hong Kong
