= Hong Kong at the 2013 World Championships in Athletics =

- WA code: HKG

in Moscow
- Competitors: 6
- Medals: Gold 0 Silver 0 Bronze 0 Total 0

World Championships in Athletics appearances
- 1983; 1987; 1991; 1993; 1995; 1997; 1999; 2001; 2003; 2005; 2007; 2009; 2011; 2013; 2015; 2017; 2019; 2022; 2023; 2025

Hong Kong competed at the 2013 World Championships in Athletics in Moscow, Russia, from 10–18 August 2013. A team of six athletes was announced to represent the country in the event.

== Results ==
(q – qualified, NM – no mark, SB – season best)

=== Men ===
Athlete	Event	Preliminaries		Heats		Semifinals		Final	
Athlete	Event	Time	Rank	Time	Rank	Time	Rank	Time	Rank
Man Lok Ho; Chun Ho Lai; Ka Fung Ng; Yik Chun Tang; Chi Ho Tsui	4 × 100 metres relay								

=== Women ===
Athlete	Event	Preliminaries		Heats		Semifinals		Final	
Athlete	Event	Time	Rank	Time	Rank	Time	Rank	Time	Rank
Yee Pui Fong	100 metres								
