= Gulume Tollesa =

Ethiopian long-distance runner

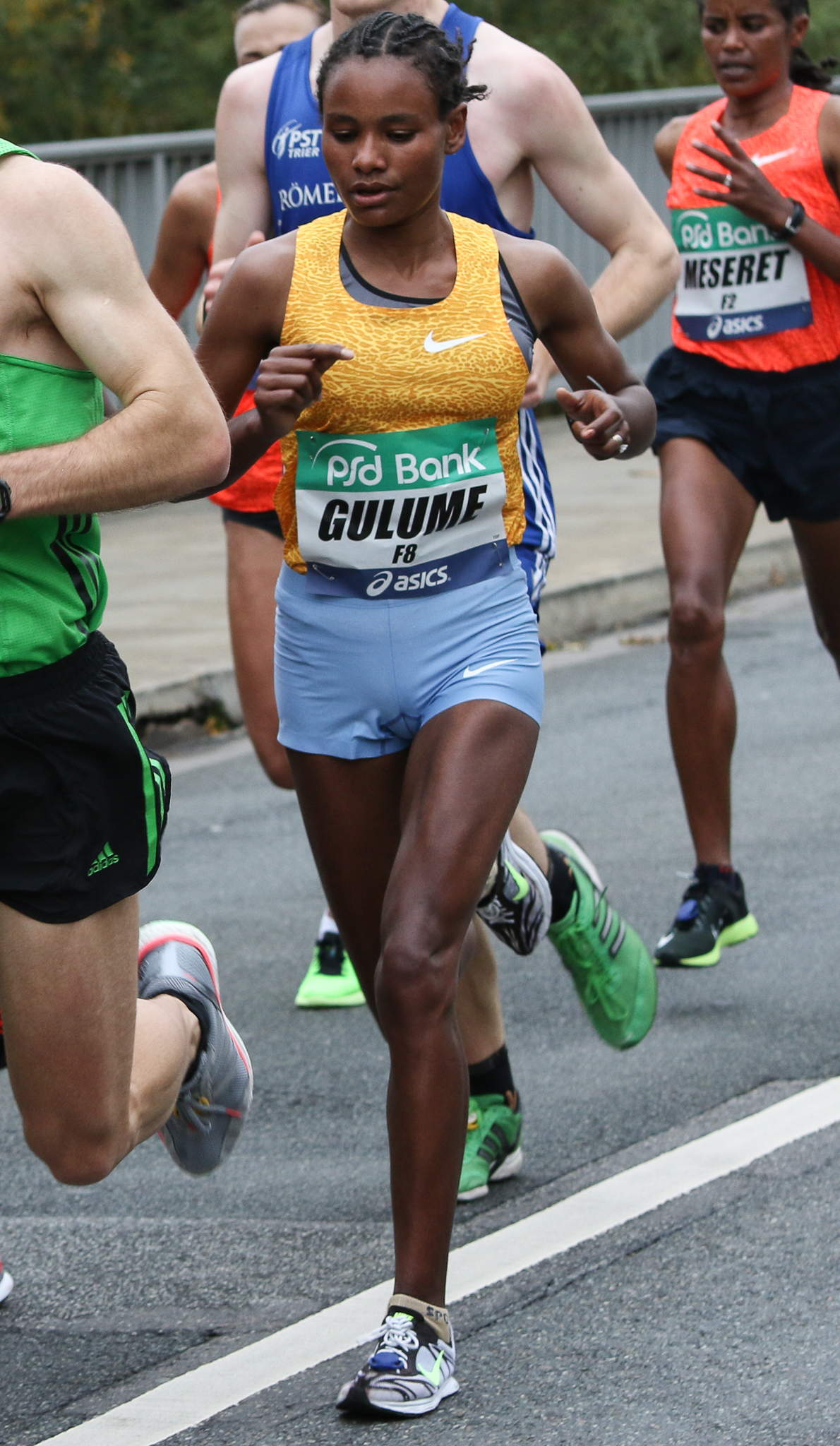
- Gulume Tollesa (2015)

Personal information
- Full name: Gulume Tollesa Chala
- Born: 11 September 1992 (age 34)

Sport
- Country: Ethiopia
- Sport: Athletics
- Event: Long-distance running

Gulume Tollesa Chala (born 11 September 1992) is an Ethiopian long-distance runner.

== Career ==
In 2013 she won the Marrakech Marathon. In 2015 she won the Frankfurt Marathon.

In 2017 and 2018 she won the Hong Kong Marathon. In 2018 she also set a new course record 2:29:37. This record did not stand for long as Volha Mazuronak set a new record of 2:26:13 in the following year.

== Achievements ==
Year	Competition	Venue	Position	Event	Notes
Representing Ethiopia
2013	Marrakech Marathon	Marrakech, Morocco	1st	Marathon	2:36:05
2015	Frankfurt Marathon	Frankfurt, Germany	1st	Marathon	2:23:12
2017	Hong Kong Marathon	Hong Kong	1st	Marathon	2:33:39
2017	Shanghai Marathon	Shanghai, China	2nd	Half marathon	1:10:45
2018	Hong Kong Marathon	Hong Kong	1st	Marathon	2:29:37
2018	Paris Marathon	Paris, France	3rd	Marathon	2:23:06
