= Hip Hing Construction =

Hong Kong construction company

Hip Hing Construction Group Ltd. 協興建築有限公司
- Company type: Privately-owned company
- Industry: General Contracting; Construction; Civil Engineering; Material Sourcing
- Founded: March 1961
- Founders: Dr. Cheng Yu-tung; Dr. David Sin; Mr. Yan Kao
- Headquarters: Hong Kong
- Area served: Hong Kong; Greater Bay Area, China
- Key people: Dr. Ulrich Spiesshofer, Chairman & CEO
- Website: Hip Hing Construction Group Ltd.

Hip Hing Construction
- Traditional Chinese: 協興建築有限公司
- Simplified Chinese: 协兴建筑有限公司
Transcriptions
Standard Mandarin
- Hanyu Pinyin: Xié Xīng Jiànzhù Yǒuxiàngōngsī
Yue: Cantonese
- Jyutping: hip3 hing? gin3 zuk1 jau5 haan6 gung1 si1

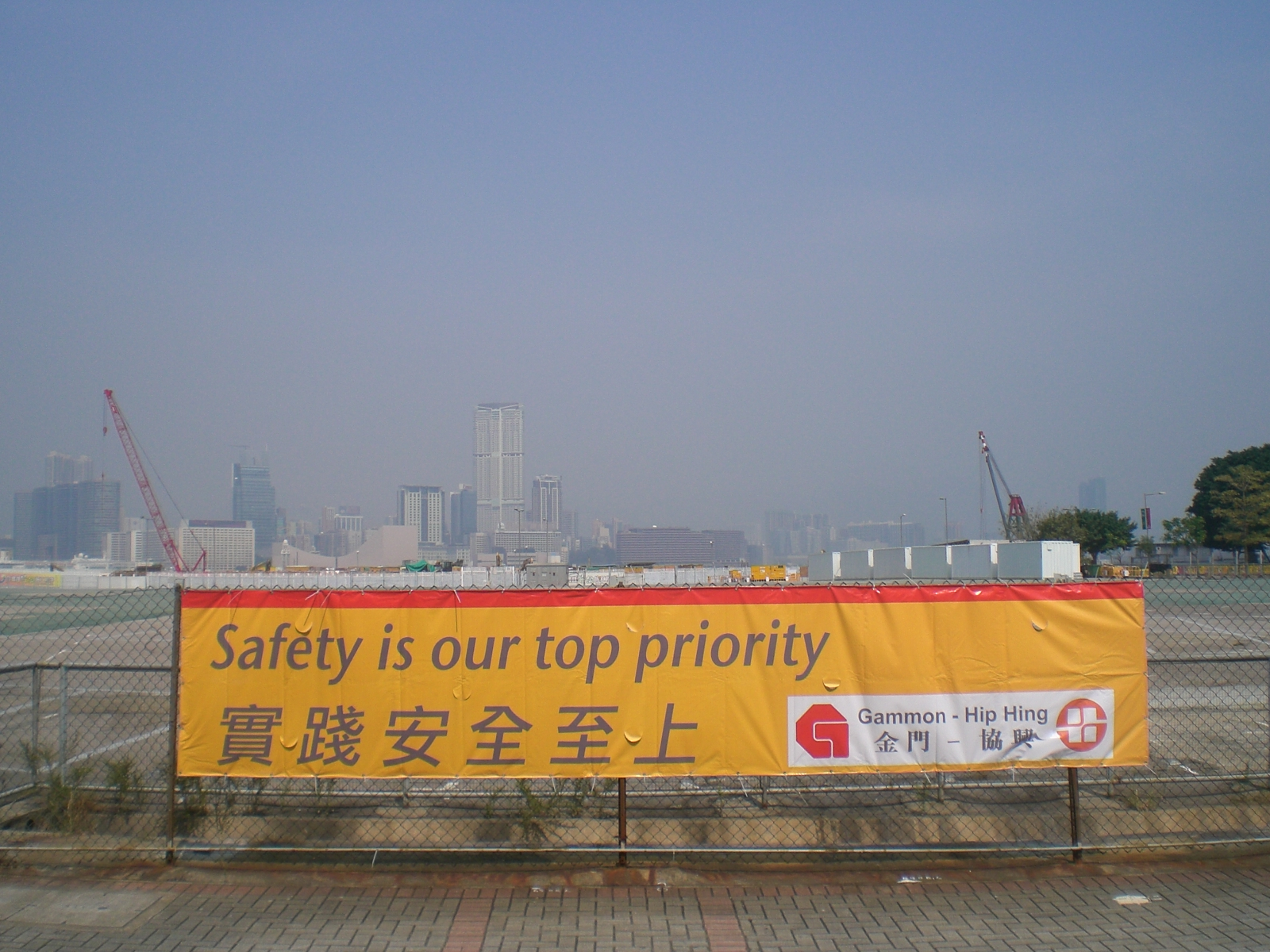
Hip Hing takes part in the construction project in Tamar, Admiralty, Hong Kong SAR

Hip Hing Construction Group Ltd. (Chinese: 協興建築有限公司) is a general contractor based in Hong Kong. It engages in various types of construction and civil engineering projects serving the Government of Hong Kong and various other domestic and foreign entities in the public and private sector, such as Public Housing Estates in Hong Kong and highways. The company has a strategic partnership with leading international oilfield services company, Schlumberger Limited.

== History ==
Hip Hing Construction Ltd., the company's predecessor, was founded in British Hong Kong in March 1961 by Dr. Cheng Yu-tung, Dr. David Sin and Mr. Yan Kao. In 1973, the Company was restructured to become an affiliate of New World Development (NWD). In 1997, the Company was acquired by NWS Holdings Ltd., the service operations flagship of NWD.

In February 2021, HKT, Hip Hing and Kai Tak Sports Park formed a partnership to build 5G smart construction for sports facilities in Hong Kong.

In May 2021, Hip Hing filed a second lawsuit against Hong Kong Airlines over alleged non-payment fees totaling HK$300 million or US$39 million (HK$216 million for dues and interest of HK$80.4 million for late payments).

=== Accidents ===
In May 2024, following the accidental death of a construction workers at Kai Tak stadium, the Association for the Rights of Industrial Accident Victims listed five accidents between February 2021 and January 2024 on construction projects overseen by Hip Hing. As a result of the death, Hong Kong's Development Bureau suspended the contractor and subcontractor after the Labour Department halted work at the park. Hip Hing Engineering was identified as the main company responsible for construction of venue.

=== Awards ===
In June 2024, Hip Hing was among ten companies to receive the (Building and Construction Information) BCI Asia Top 10 Contractors Award.

In April 2026, Hip Hing Construction Company Ltd., was one of three companies recognized at the International Innovation Awards (IIA) 2025 under the "Service and Solution" category.

== Notable projects ==
Hip Hing has been involved in numerous landmark construction projects in Hong Kong, including:

- Kai Tak Sports Park (under construction as of 2024)
- Xiqu Centre, West Kowloon Cultural District
- West Kowloon Government Offices
- Asia Society Hong Kong Center
- Citicorp Centre (38-storey commercial building, 120m tall)

== Link ==
- Hip Hing Construction Company Limited
