= Collusion of government officials and entrepreneurs =

Examination of corruption in China

- Simplified Chinese: 官商勾结
- Traditional Chinese: 官商勾結
Transcriptions
Standard Mandarin
- Hanyu Pinyin: Guójiā jīhuì zhǔyì

The collusion of government officials and entrepreneurs (simplified Chinese: 官商勾结; traditional Chinese: 官商勾結), or government–commercial corruption, official-business collusion, most generally translated as government-business collusion, is a term with a negative connotation that generally refers to the government or individual officials who show favoritism and dereliction of duty by transferring benefits to individual enterprises in the formulation or implementation of policies, which cannot be directly equated with corruption because there is no substantial monetary transaction, but the government favors public power over certain businesspeople or consortiums and the political system is tilted toward interest groups. In short, it means collusion between government and business to transferring interests.

== Related studies ==
- Banfield, E.C. (1995). Business-government Collusion. American Institute for Economic Research.
- Civil Human Rights Front (2002). On Government-business Collusion. Civil Human Rights Front.
- Government-business Collusion and Corruption. Nanjing Normal University. 2002.
