= Yiu Kit Ching =

Hong Kong long-distance runner

Christy Yiu Kit-Ching
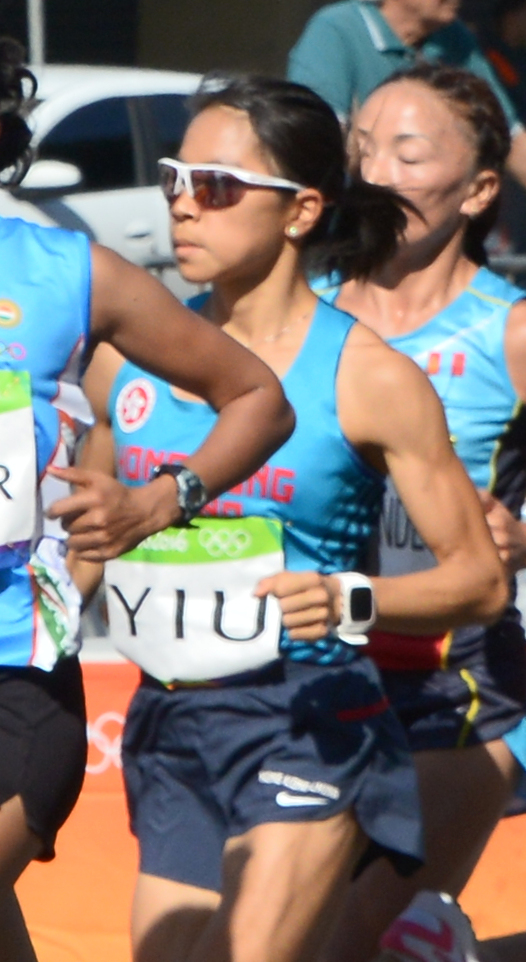

Personal information
- Born: 20 February 1988 (age 38) Hong Kong

Sport
- Country: Hong Kong
- Sport: Track and field
- Event: long-distance running
- Updated on 16 August 2016

Christy Yiu Kit-Ching (Chinese: 姚潔貞 born 20 February 1988) is a long-distance runner from Hong Kong. She competed in the marathon event at the 2015 World Championships in Athletics in Beijing, China and the 2016 Olympic Games.

== Career ==
Yiu finished 39th in the women's marathon at the 2016 Olympic Games in Rio de Janeiro, setting a new personal best and national record with a time of two hours 36 minutes and 11 seconds.

In 2020, she competed in the women's half marathon at the 2020 World Athletics Half Marathon Championships held in Gdynia, Poland.

== Personal bests ==
- 1500 metres – 4:32.63 min, 29 Jun 2014, Hong Kong (HKG)
- 3000 metres Steeplechase – 10:25.81 min, 9 Oct 2013, Tianjin (CHN) - HKR
- 5000 metres – 16:01.88 min, 7 May 2016, Nobeoka (JPN)
- 10,000 metres – 33:45.00 min, 16 July 2015, Abashiri (JPN)
- 10 km – 33:48 min, 17 October 2020, Gdynia (POR) - HKR
- 15 km – 51:06 min, 17 October 2020, Gdynia (POR) - HKR
- Half marathon – 1:12:10 hrs, 17 October 2020, Gdynia (POR) - HKR
- Marathon – 2:31:24 hrs, 6 May 2021, Milano (ITA) - HKR

== See also ==
- Hong Kong at the 2015 World Championships in Athletics
