= Hong Kong, China Association of Athletics Affiliates =

Governing body of athletics in Hong Kong

Hong Kong, China Association of Athletics Affiliates Limited
- 中國香港田徑總會
- Sport: Athletics
- Abbreviation: HKAAA
- Founded: 1951
- Affiliation: World Athletics
- Regional affiliation: Asian Athletics Association (AAA)
- Headquarters: Hong Kong
- President: Kee KWAN
- Secretary: Yu Ho Dennis NG

Official website
- www.hkaaa.com
- (Hong Kong)

Hong Kong, China Association of Athletics Affiliates Limited (Chinese: 中國香港田徑總會) is the sports governing body for the sport of athletics in Hong Kong, a special administrative region of China.

It is the Hong Kong affiliate of World Athletics and the Asian Athletics Association.

== See also ==
- Sports Federation and Olympic Committee of Hong Kong, China
