= Hong Kong Games =

The Hong Kong Games (HKG, Chinese: 全港運動會) are a multisport event in Hong Kong which was first held in 2007 and has taken place every two years since then. All 18 districts of Hong Kong form the participating units for the Games.

== Purpose ==
The Hong Kong Games are held to provide more opportunities for participation, sharing, and cooperation in sports in the community and to promote communication and friendship among the 18 districts. It also allows the relevant units to strengthen the cohesion of the community. Moreover, it promotes the idea of "sports for all" in society in order to raise the standard of sports in Hong Kong.

== Symbols ==
The emblem of the Games is composed of three rings resembling the number "18", which symbolises the 18 participating districts in the Hong Kong Games. In addition, it also represents the three regions of Hong Kong: Hong Kong Island, Kowloon and the New Territories; on the other hand, it symbolises the partnership between the organiser, co-ordinator and co-organisers of the Games. The thin lines next to the rings strengthen the feeling of motion and convey the vitality of the 18 districts. The colours red, orange-brown, and blue represent the athlete's energy during indoor and outdoor games, respectively. The theme song of the Hong Kong Games, "Yan Yan Hei Dung" (人人起動) is sung by Joey Yung with Cheung Ka Seng (張家誠) as the composer and Adrian Chan as the arranger.

== Organiser ==
The Sports Commission is the organiser for the Hong Kong Games, and the Community Sports Committee is the coordinator. The 18 District Councils, the Leisure and Cultural Services Department, the Sports Federation & Olympic Committee of Hong Kong, China and the related sports associations are the co-organisers of the Games.

== Qualification ==
The following are the core requirements for qualification to participate in the Hong Kong Games:

- Must be nominated by their respective District Councils and participate in the competition in the name of the District Councils;
- Holders of a valid Hong Kong identity card who have resided in Hong Kong for three years;
- In the area of their residence and only represent that district for competition;
- Athletes who are elected to represent Hong Kong in multisport games such as the Olympics, Asian Games, World Championships, or Asian Championships are not allowed to participate.

== List of Hong Kong Games ==
	Year	Opening Ceremony	Closing Ceremony	Participates	Overall Championship	Ref.
1	2007	4 April	6 May	1287	Kwai Tsing District	
2	2009	9 May	31 May	2307	Yuen Long District	
3	2011	14 May	5 June	3017	Yuen Long District	
4	2013	27 April	2 June	3100	Yuen Long District	
5	2015	25 April	31 May	3205	Yuen Long District	
6	2017	23 April	28 May	3205	Yuen Long District	
7	2019	28 April	2 June	3200	Yuen Long District	
8	2022	Cancelled due to COVID				
