= 2007 Hong Kong Games =

Sports event in Hong Kong

The 2007 Hong Kong Games, officially known as The 1st Hong Kong Games (Chinese: 第一屆全港運動會) was a major multi-sport event in Hong Kong and the debut of the bi-annual Hong Kong Games. The games were staged between 4 April and 6 May 2007, with participation from 1287 athletes. The events were held in Hong Kong's Kwai Tsing District.

== Purpose ==
The Hong Kong Games are held to provide more opportunities for participation, sharing and cooperation in sports in the community and to promote communication and friendship among the 18 districts. It also allows the relevant units to strengthen the cohesion of the community. Moreover, it promotes the idea of "sports for all" in the society in order to raise the standard of sports in Hong Kong.

The Sports Commission is the organiser of the Hong Kong Games, and the Community Sports Committee is the coordinator. The 18 District Councils, the Leisure and Cultural Services Department, the Sports Federation & Olympic Committee of Hong Kong, China and the related sports associations are the co-organisers of the Games.

== Events ==
The 2007 Hong Kong Games were held in Kwai Tsing District and included 4 separate events: athletics, basketball, badminton and table tennis. Two more events were added in the 2009 2nd Hong Kong Games: swimming and tennis. In 2009, the Games moved to Yuen Long District.

== See also ==
- 2009 Hong Kong Games
