= Tseung Kwan O Sports Ground =

Stadium in Hong Kong

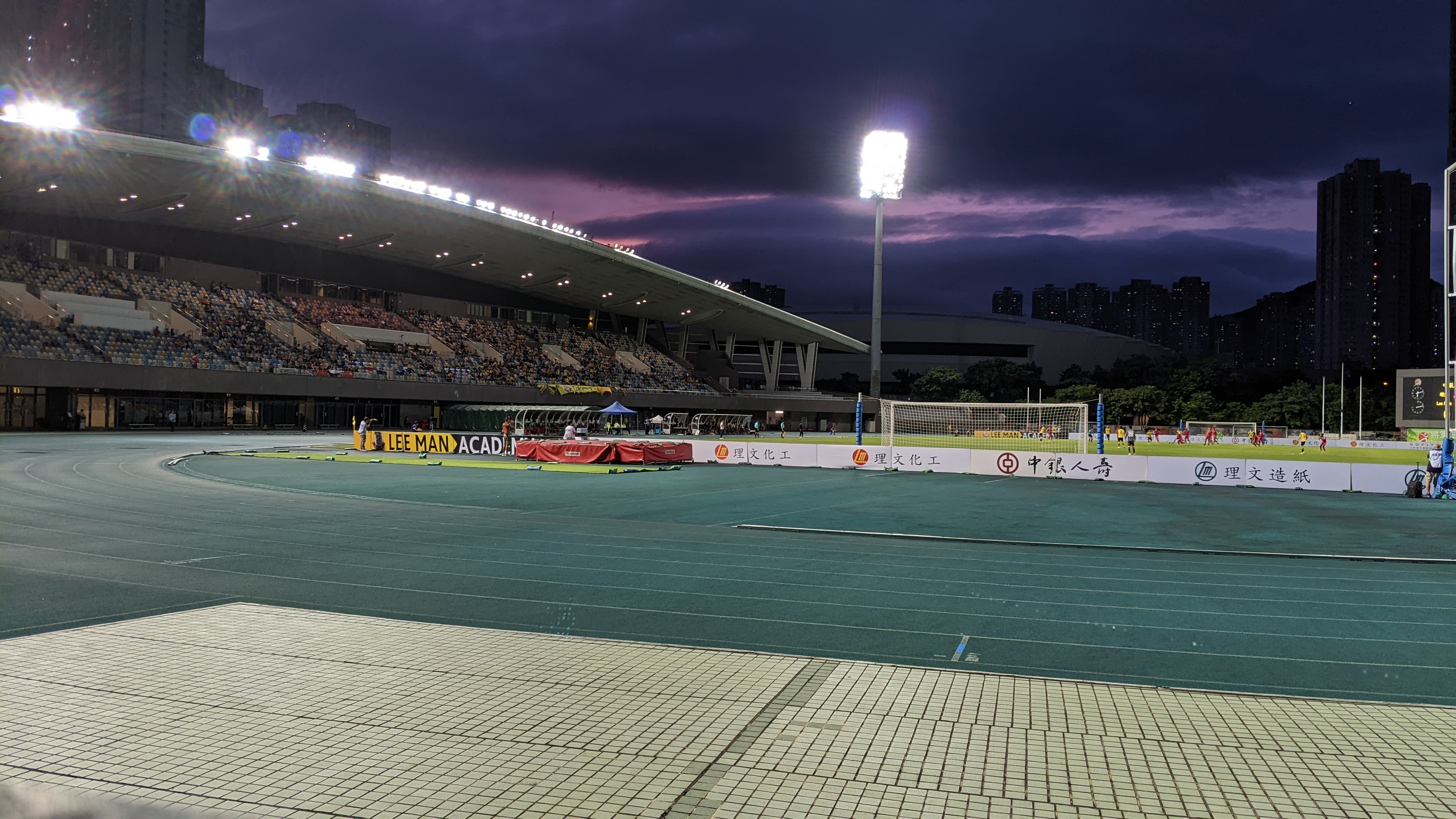
- Interactive map of Tseung Kwan O Sports Ground
- Address: 109 Po Hong Road, Tseung Kwan O, Hong Kong
- Coordinates: 22.311886°N 114.263940°E
- Owner: Hong Kong Government
- Operator: Leisure and Cultural Services Department
- Capacity: 3,500; 5,000 (2009 East Asian Games)
- Surface: Grass
- Pitch size: 105 x 68 metres (115 x 74 yards)
- Public transit: Tseung Kwan O station Hang Hau station

Construction
- Groundbreaking: 18 June 2006; 20 years ago
- Opened: 19 May 2009; 17 years ago
- Cost: HK$350 million
- Architects: P&T Group & ArupSport

Tenants
- Kitchee (2010–13, 2026–); Yokohama FC HK (2013–14); Eastern (2014–15, 2019–20); South China (2015–17); Lee Man (2017–19, 2020–25); HK U23 (2022–2023)

Tseung Kwan O Sports Ground (Chinese: 將軍澳運動場), located in Tseung Kwan O, Hong Kong, is a multi-purpose sports ground and home of Hong Kong Premier League club Eastern. It was the main venue for track and field events for the 2009 Hong Kong Games, 2009 East Asian Games and 2011 Hong Kong Games.

Occupying an area of about 5.9 hectares, it comprises a main sports ground, a warm-up secondary sports ground, and other facilities for holding large-scale international competitions. Its track and field facilities conform to International Association of Athletics Federations standards. It is located adjacent to the Hong Kong Velodrome.

== Opening ==
It was officially opened on 19 May 2009 with celebrating the 200-day countdown to the opening of the 2009 East Asian Games.

== Events held ==
- 2009 Hong Kong Games Opening ceremony and track and field event.
- 2009 East Asian Games track and field event.
- 2011 Hong Kong Games track and field event.

=== Facilities ===
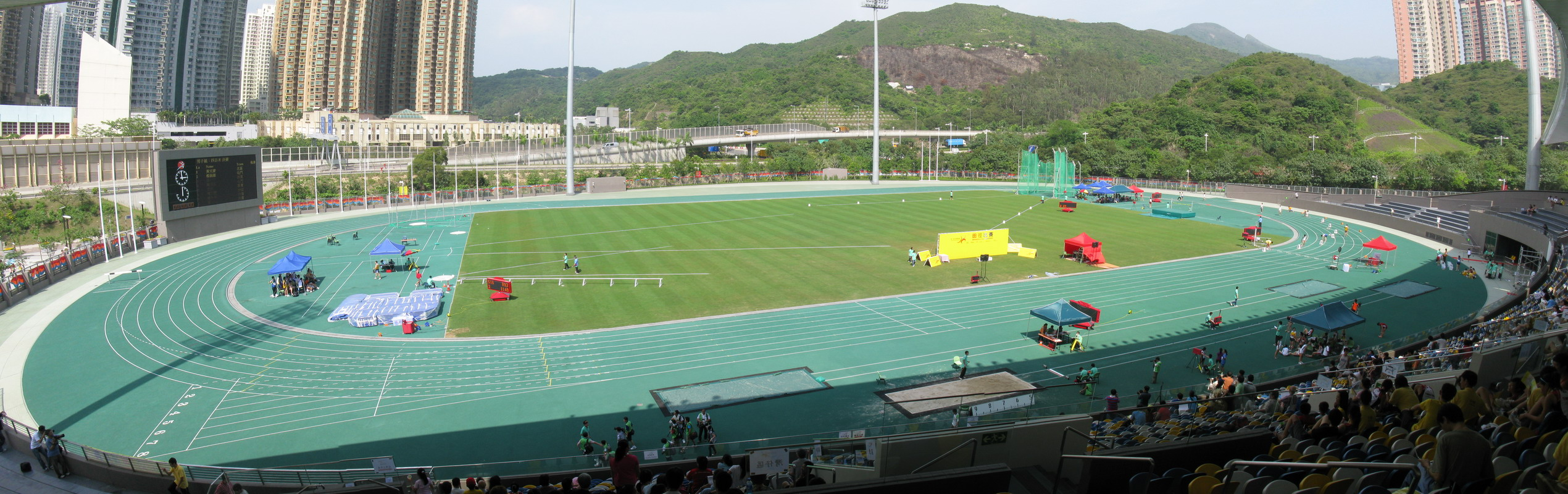
The green running tracks of Tseung Kwan O Sports Ground playing host to the 2009 Hong Kong Games.

Facilities of the main sports ground include:

- Eight-lane 400-metre all-weather synthetic running track, in a unique green colour
- Javelin-throw circle
- High jump take-off runways and pits
- Long jump and triple jump runways and pits
- Pole-vault runway and landing area
- Steeple chase facilities
- Hammer and discus cage
- Shot-put throwing area
- 11-a-side natural football pitch conforming to FIFA standards
- Covered spectator stand with a seating capacity of about 3,500 and spaces for a temporary spectator stand with 1,500 seats.

=== Secondary sports ground ===
The secondary sports ground includes:

- Warm-up track and field facilities
- Seven-a-side natural turf football pitch

=== Ancillary facilities ===
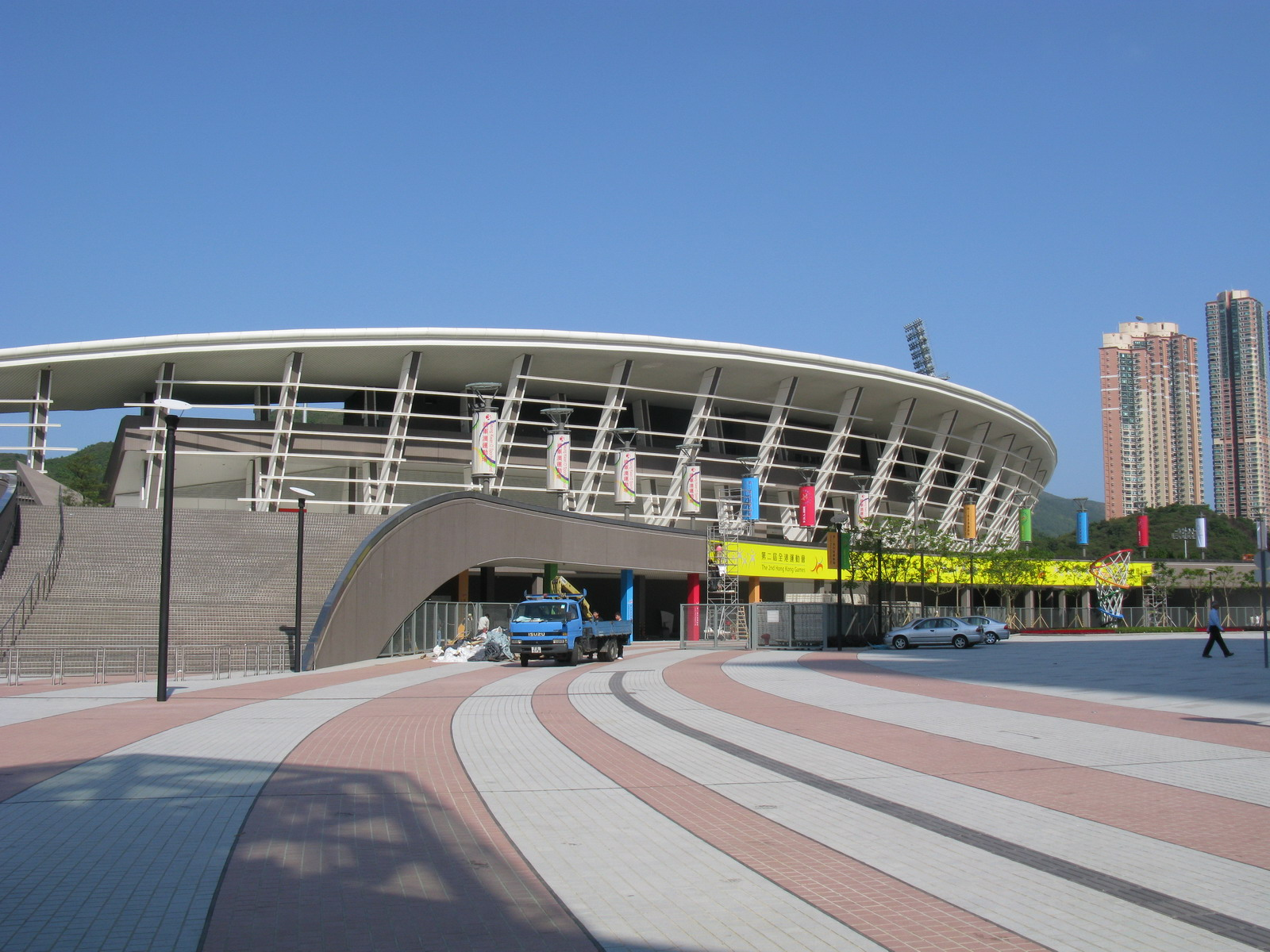
Main Entrance.

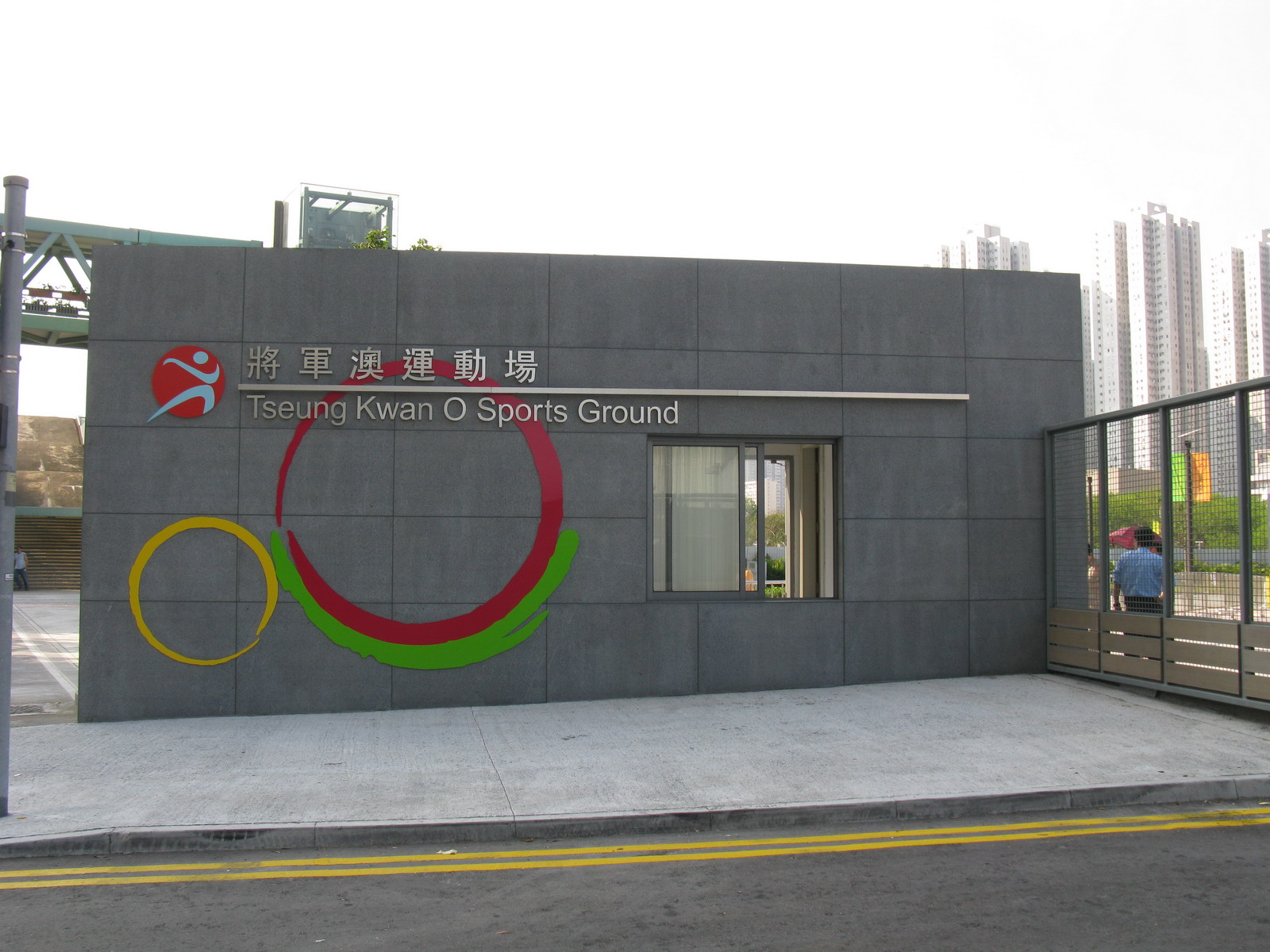

Other ancillary facilities include:

- Doping control rooms
- Weight-lifting rooms
- Control rooms
- Press facilities
- Necessary facilities for organising events and conferences as well as holding training exercises.

== Gallery ==
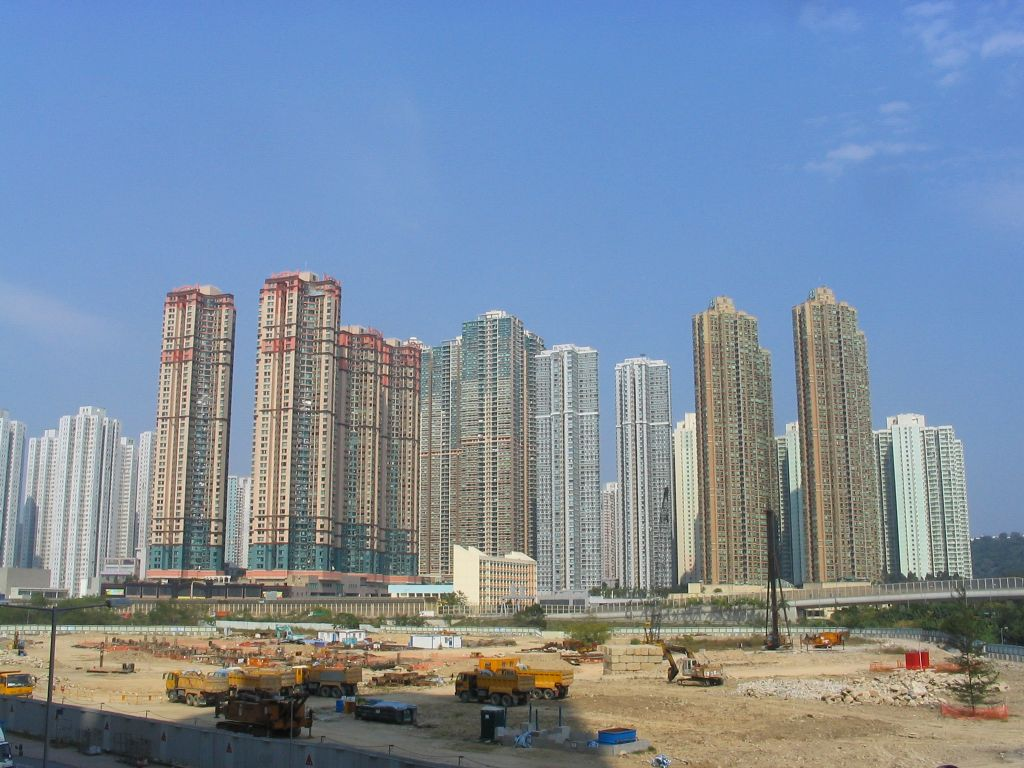
Under construction in February 2007

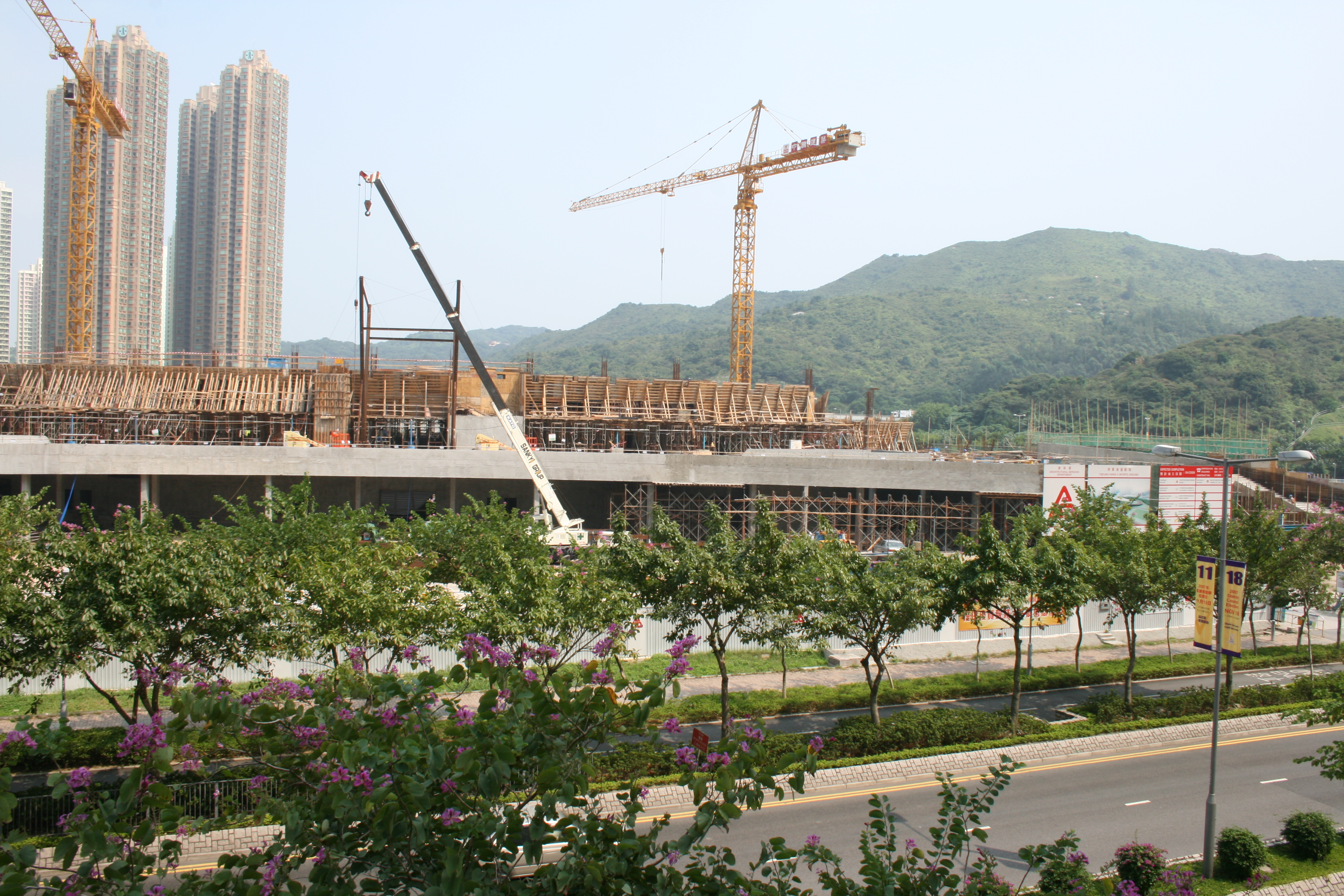
Under construction in October 2007

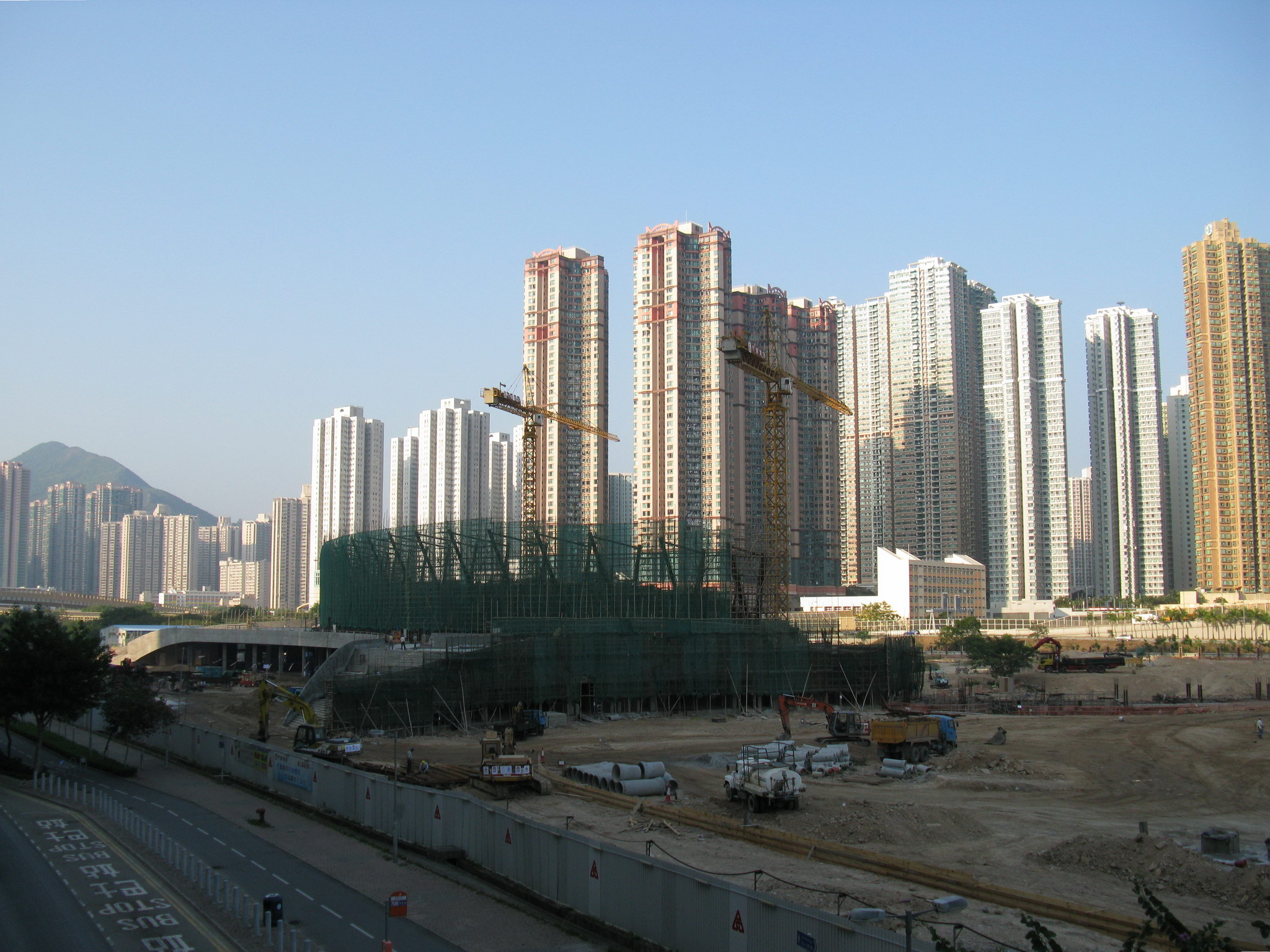
Under construction in November 2007

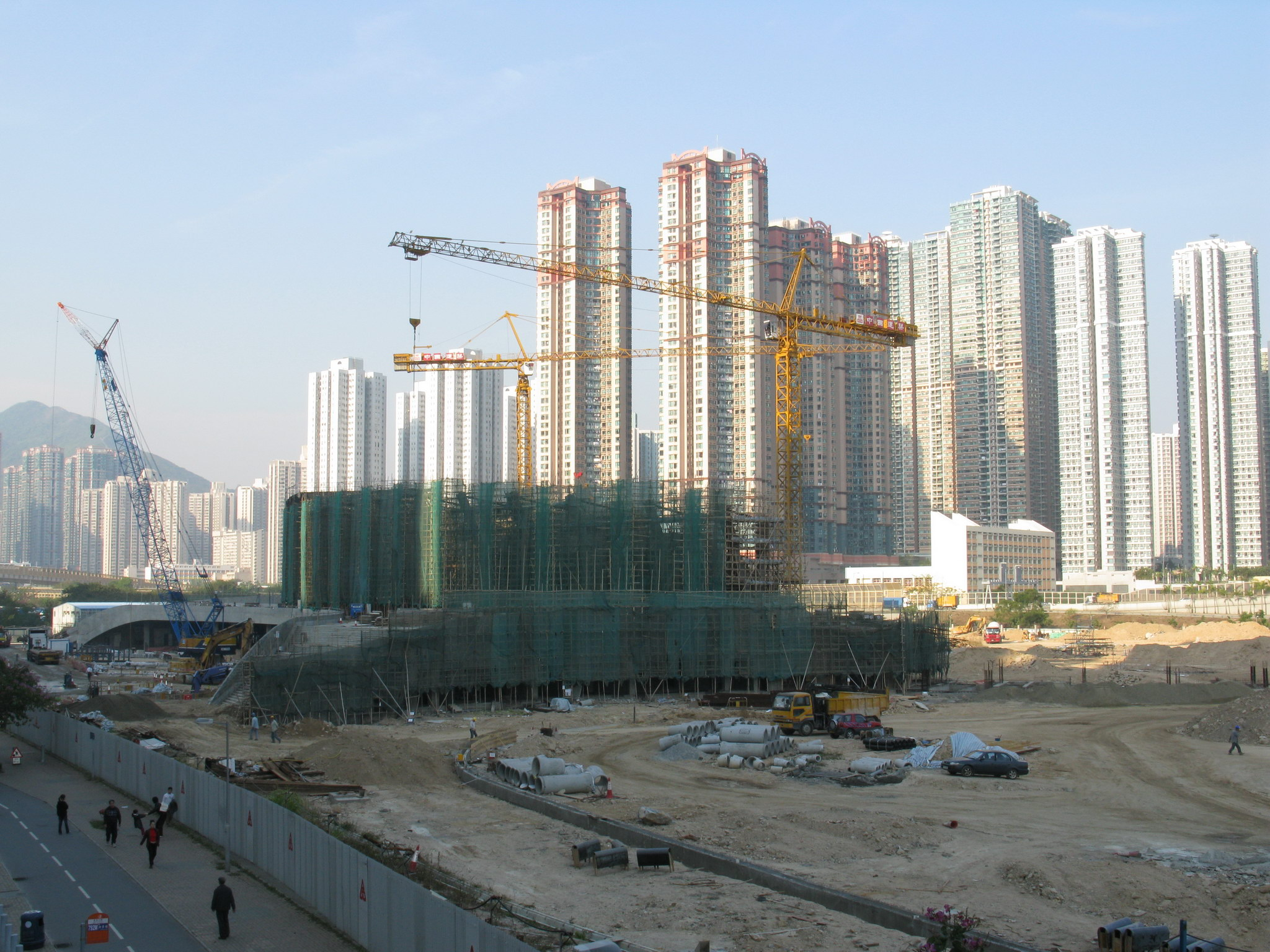
Under construction in January 2008

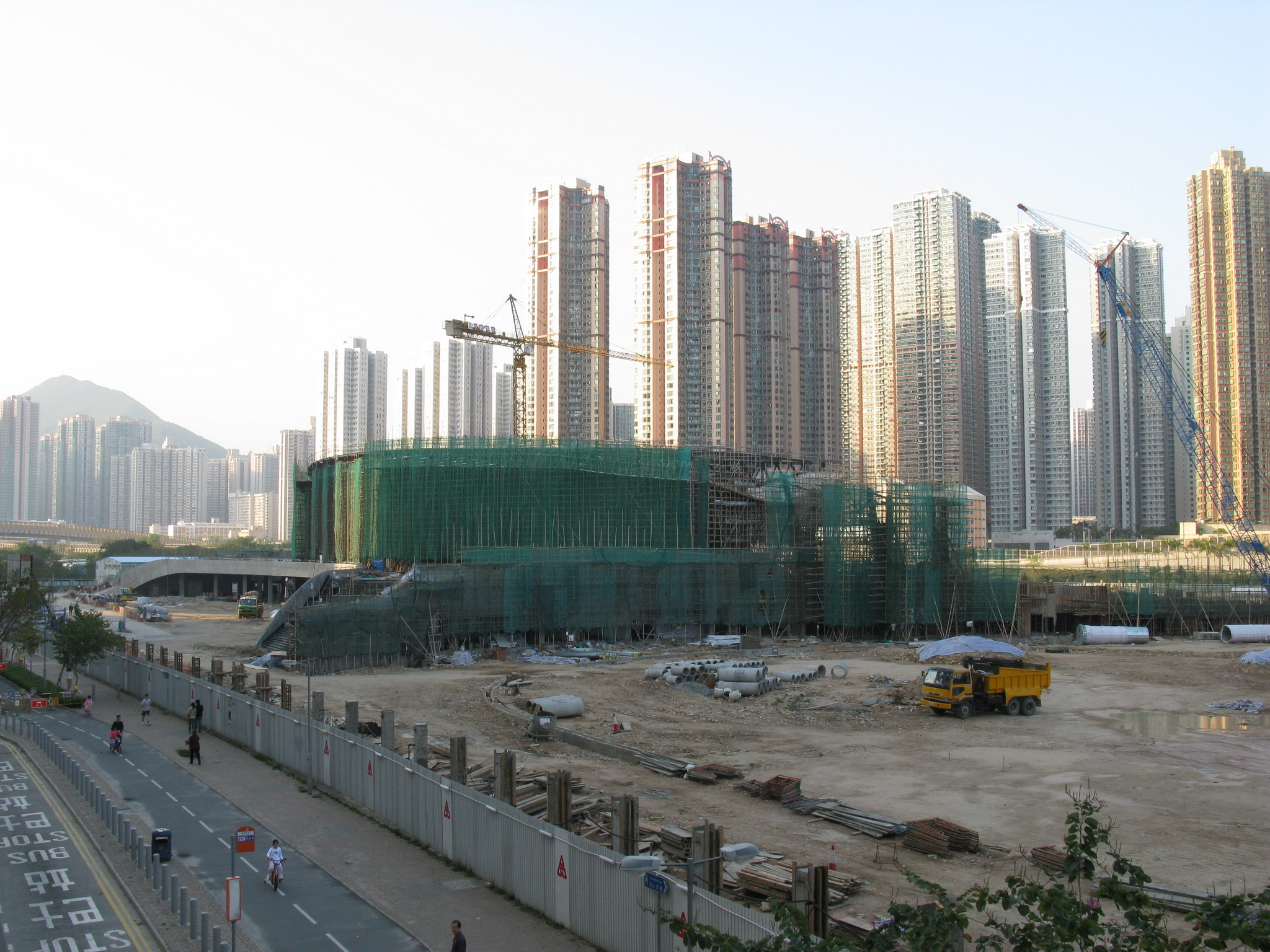
Under construction in March 2008

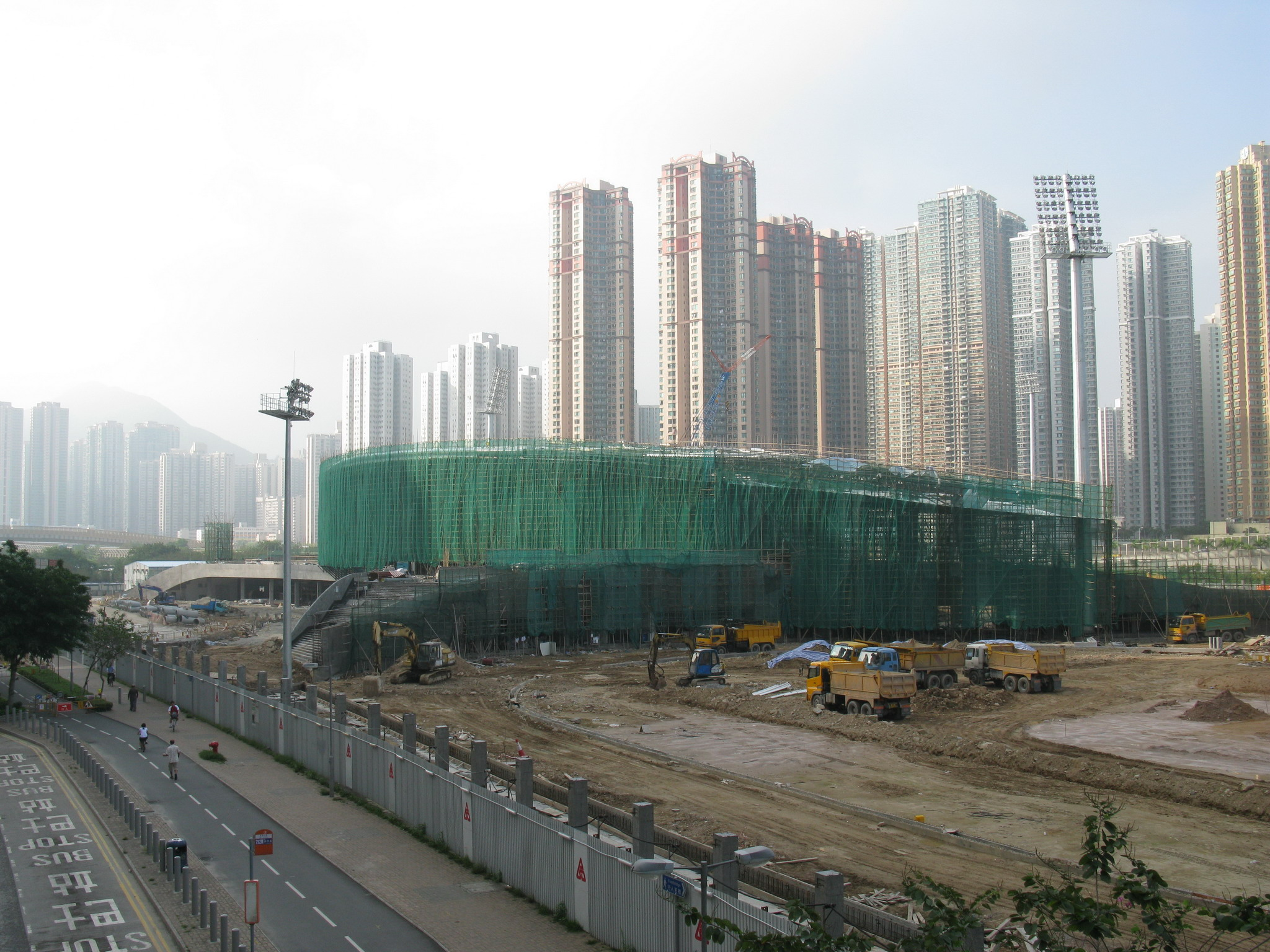
Under construction in May 2008

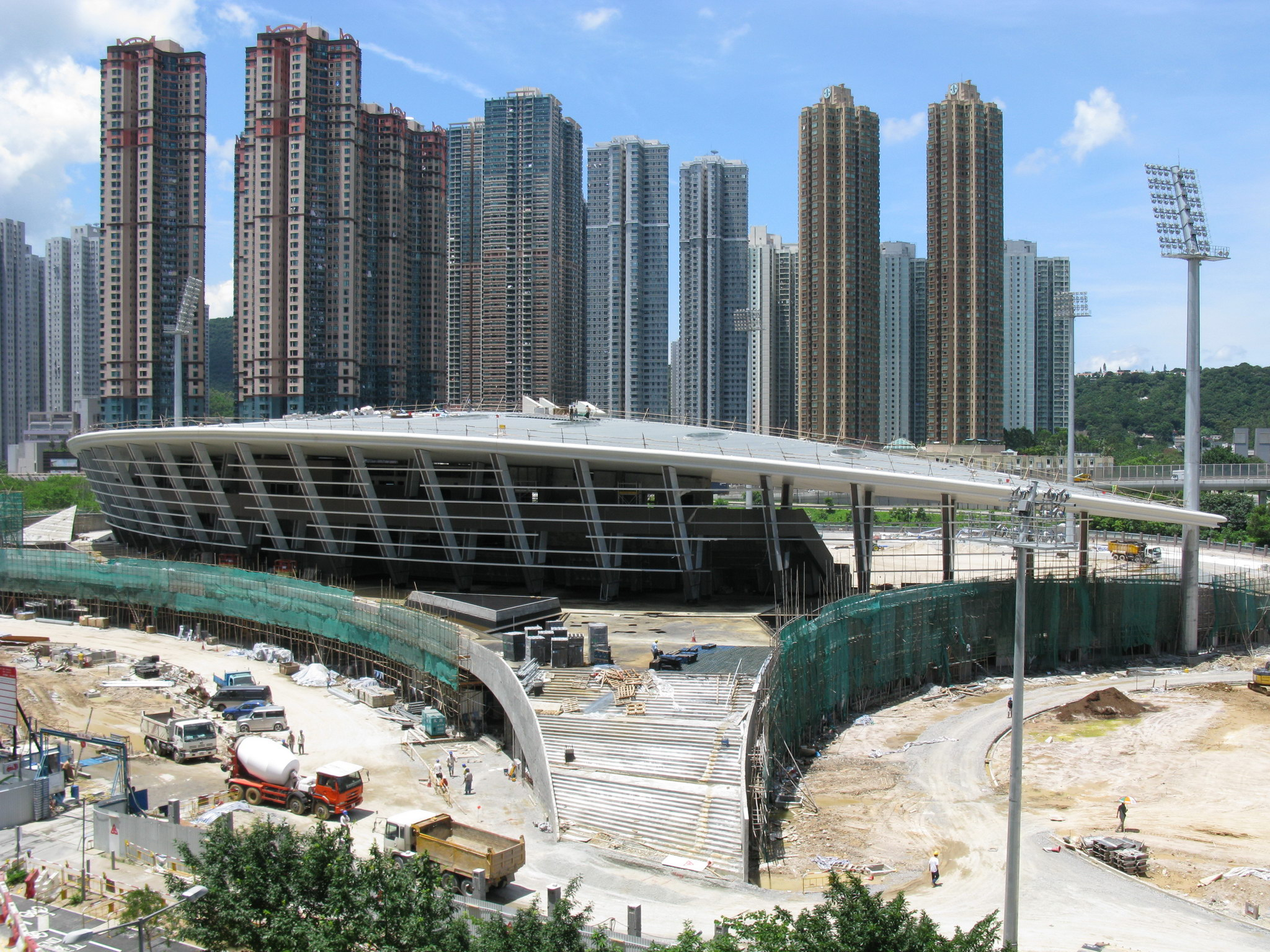
Under construction in July 2008

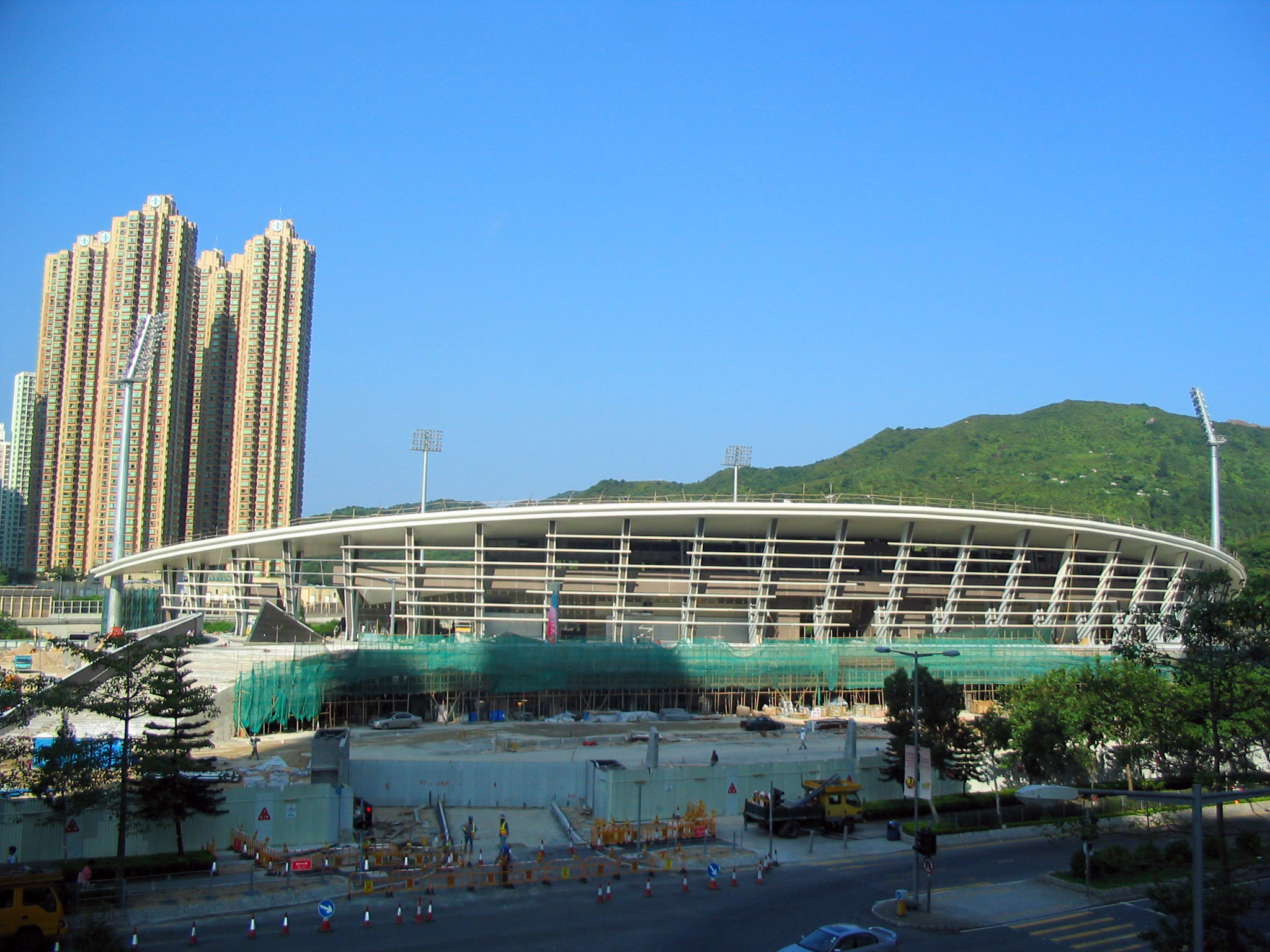
Under construction on 17 August 2008

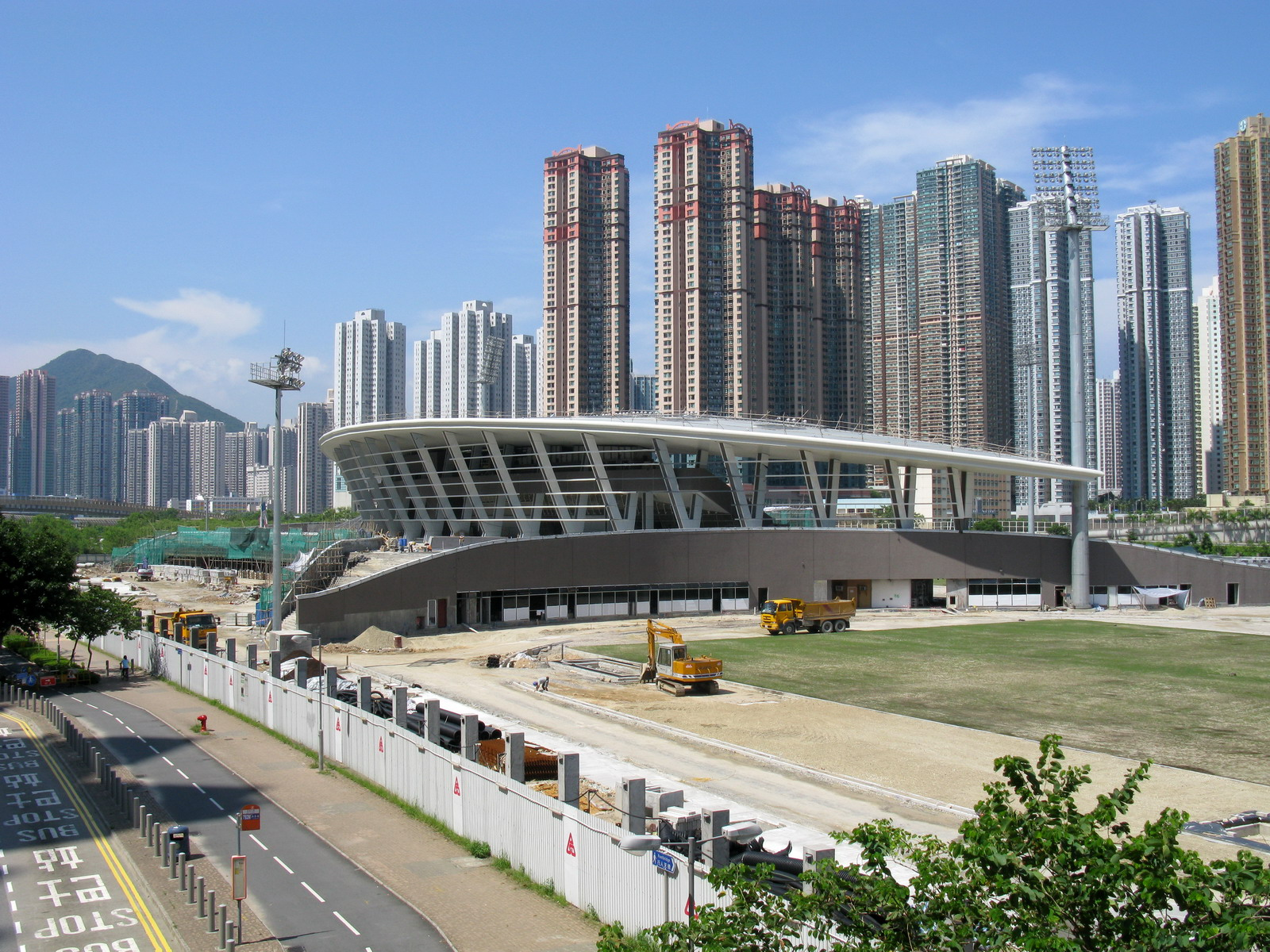
Under construction in September 2008

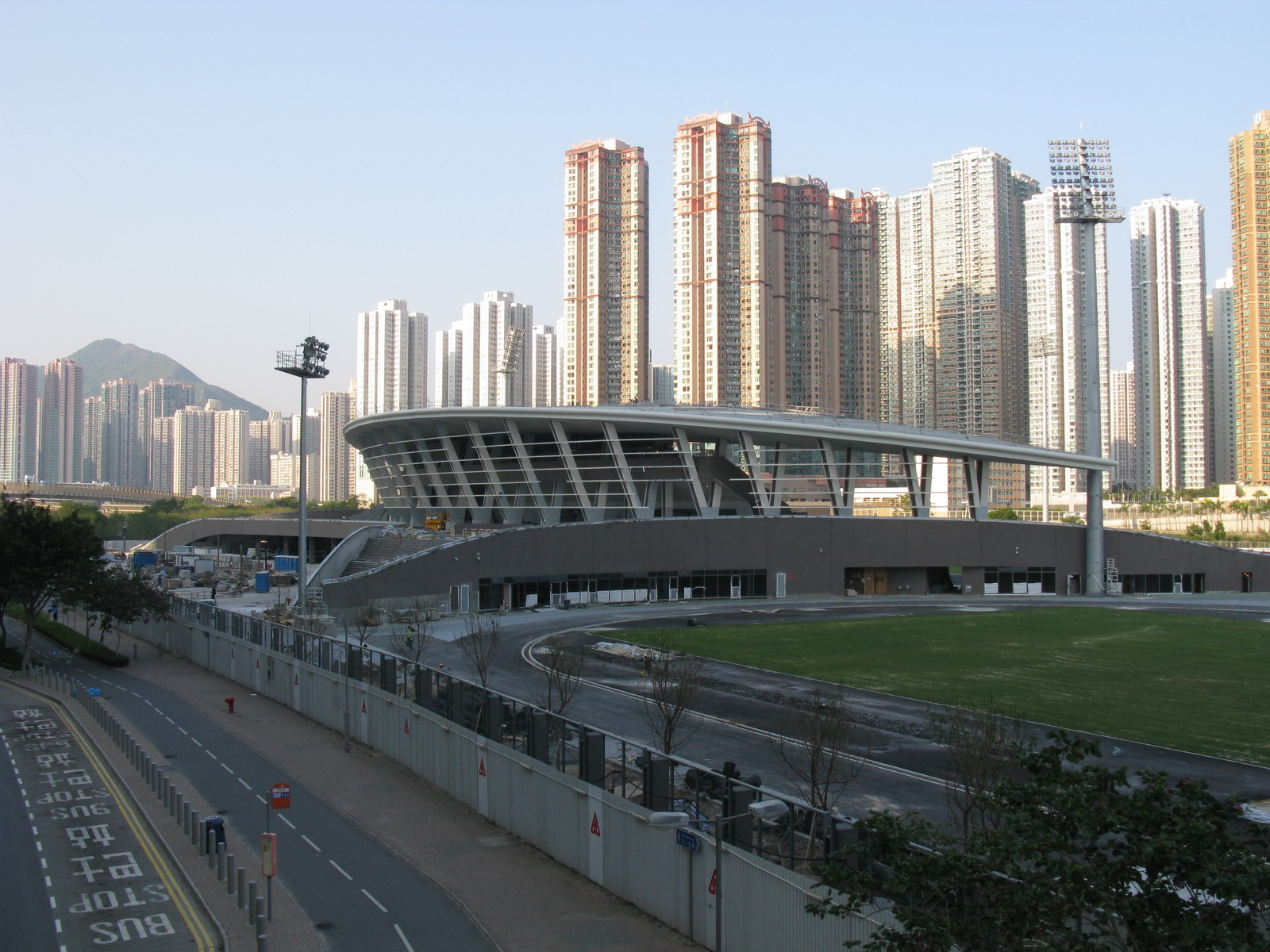
Under construction in November 2008

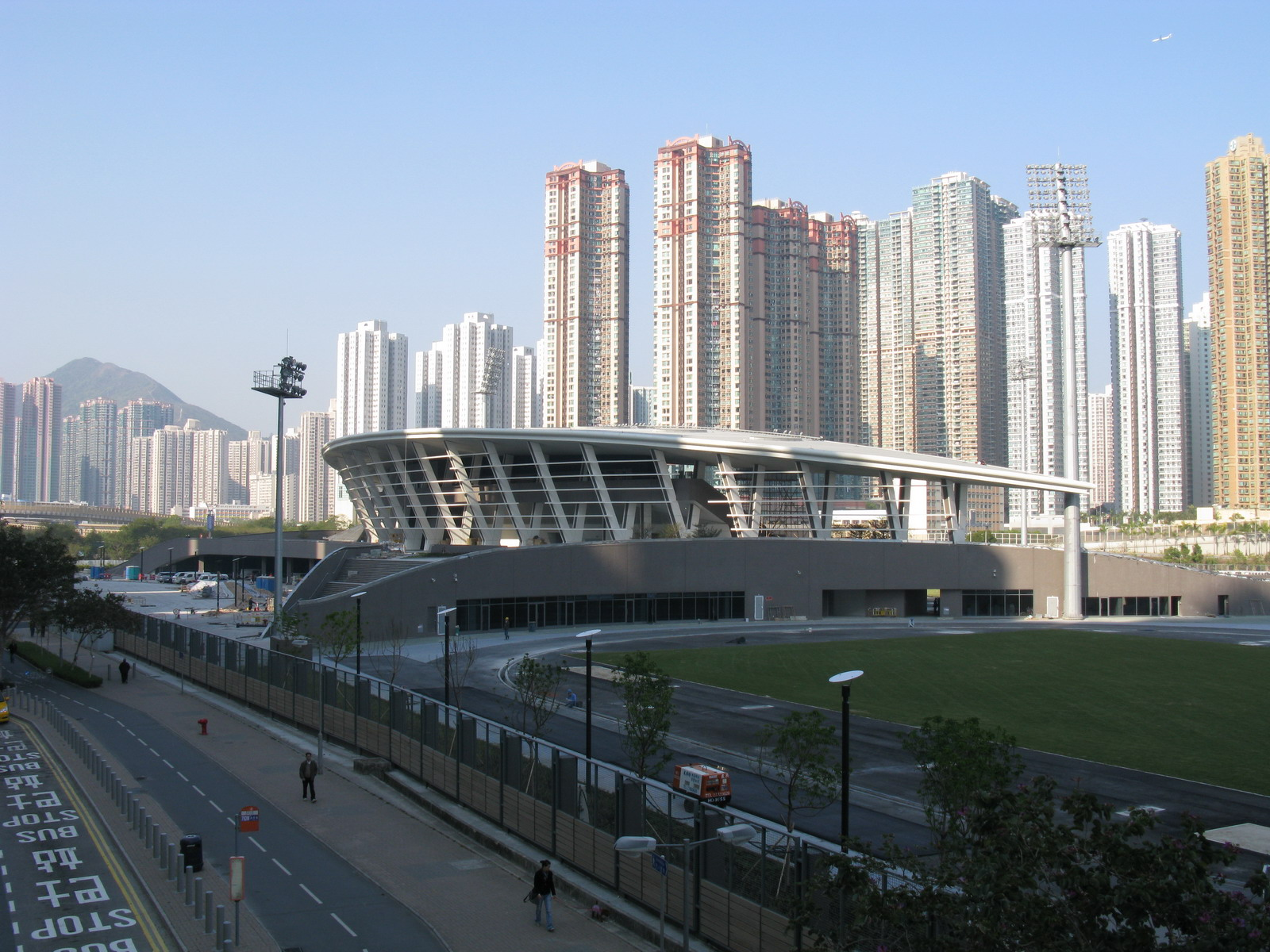
Under construction in January 2009

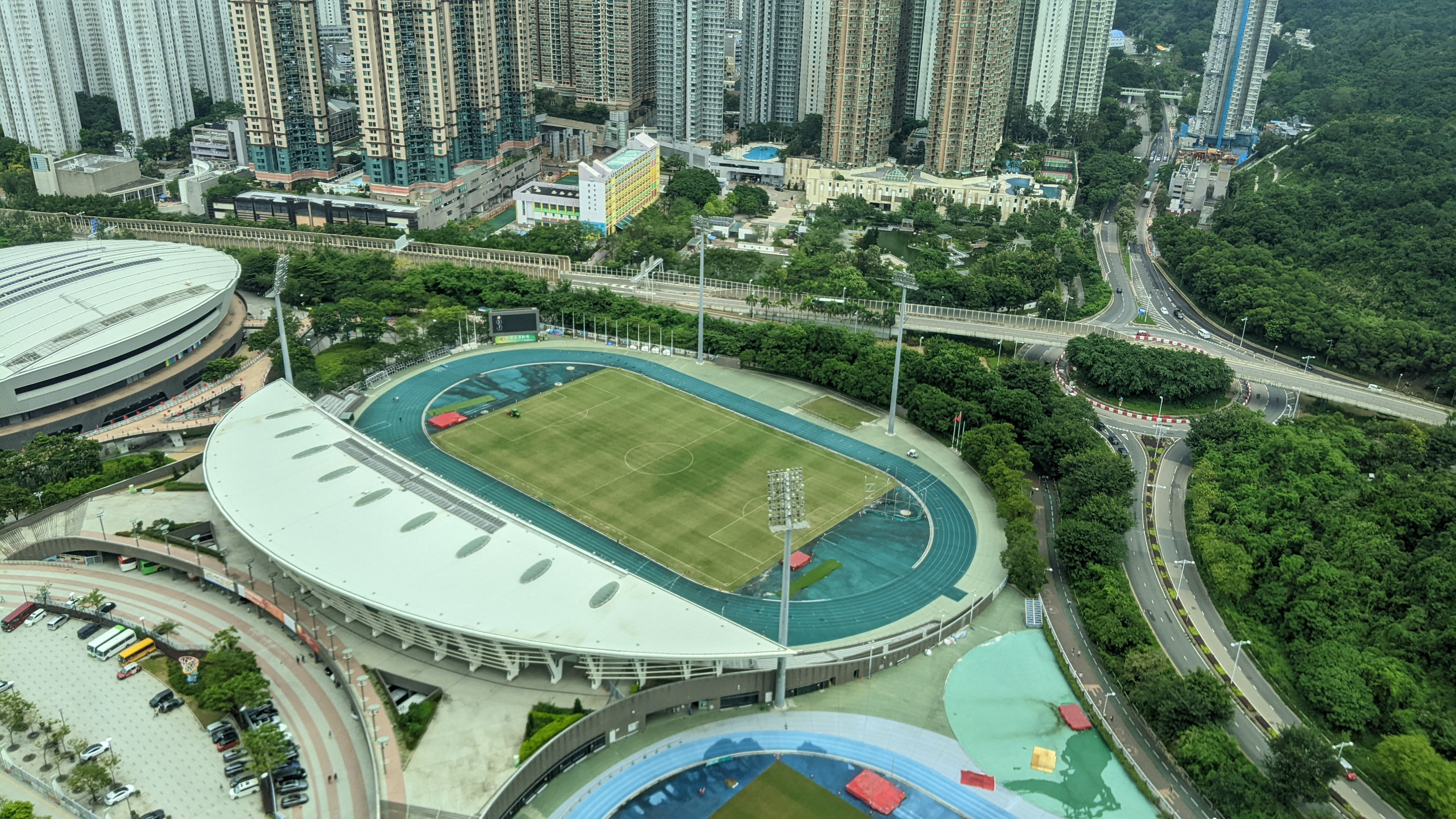
Aerial view in 2023

Events and tenants
Preceded by Estádio Campo Desportivo; Macau	East Asian Games Athletics competitions Main Venue; 2009	Succeeded by TBA
