= 2011 Hong Kong Games =

The 3rd Hong Kong Games
- Host city: Hong Kong
- Teams: 18
- Athletes: over 3000
- Events: 83 events in 8 sports
- Opening: 14 May 2011
- Closing: 5 June 2011
- Opened by: Chief Executive Donald Tsang
- Athlete's Oath: Chan Tsz Ching, Yuen Long
- Judge's Oath: N/A
- Torch lighter: Zou Kai and Yang Wei
- Main venue: Siu Sai Wan Sports Ground (Opening); Kowloon Park Sports Centre (Closing)

The 2011 Hong Kong Games, officially known as The 3rd Hong Kong Games (Chinese: 第三屆全港運動會), is a major biannual multi-sport event to be held in Hong Kong between the 18 Districts. The games will take place from 14 May to 5 June 2011.

== Event ==
It total there are 83 events in the 8 sports. This includes 42 events for male and 41 events for female. Compare with 2009 Hong Kong Games, futsal and volleyball are the new event.

The 8 sports are:

- Athletics
- Basketball
- Badminton
- Swimming
- Table Tennis
- Tennis
- Futsal
- Volleyball

The 18 District Councils recruited athletes in an open selection process to represent their district in the event.

== Venue ==
Here is the final venue of each events.

Athletics	Badminton	Basketball	Swimming
Tseung Kwan O Sports Ground	Kowloon Park Sports Centre	Sun Yat Sen Memorial Park Sports Centre	Kowloon Park Swimming Pool
Table Tennis	Tennis	Futsal	Volleyball
Harbour Road Sports Centre	Victoria Park Tennis Court	Ma On Shan Sports Centre	Kowloon Bay Sports Centre

== Awards ==
The District with the highest total scores will be crowned Overall Champion, followed by the first and second runners-up.

Other awards include:

- The Best Local Characteristics Award
- District with the Greatest Participation
- The Best Performance Award (for cheering)

The 2011 event will see the addition of awards for "District with the Most Gold Medals" and "District with the Best Progress".

== Medal tally ==
Hong Kong is a relatively small Special Administrative Region, so it is impossible for districts take turn to host the event. The event is held regionwide.

Rank	Districts	Gold	Silver	Bronze	Total
1	Yuen Long District	12	6	15	33
2	Sha Tin District	11	11	12	34
3	Kowloon City District	7	12	3	22
4	Sai Kung District	7	6	2	15
5	Tuen Mun District	6	7	6	19
6	Eastern District	6	6	6	18
7	Kwai Tsing District	5	3	1	9
8	Central and Western District	4	6	8	18
9	Wong Tai Sin District	4	5	7	16
10	North District	4	3	4	11
11	Wan Chai District	4	1	2	7
12	Kwun Tong District	3	7	3	13
13	Tai Po District	3	1	6	10
14	Yau Tsim Mong District	3	1	2	6
15	Islands District	2	2	1	5
16	Southern District	1	4	3	8
17	Sham Shui Po District	1	3	1	5
18	Tsuen Wan District	0	1	1	2
Totals (18 entries)		83	85	83	251

== 2015 Hong Kong Games ==
Rank	Districts	Gold	Silver	Bronze	Total
1	Yuen Long District	10	10	8	28
2	Sha Tin District	10	8	8	26
3	Kowloon City District	9	8	4	21
4	Eastern District	8	2	7	17
5	Wong Tai Sin District	7	12	3	22

== See also ==
- 2009 Hong Kong Games
