= 2009 Hong Kong Games =

The 2009 Hong Kong Games, officially known as The 2nd Hong Kong Games (Chinese: 第二屆全港運動會), was a major multi-sport event in Hong Kong. The games were staged between 9 May and 31 May 2009, with participation from 2307 athletes. The awards included 80 gold medals, 80 silver medals and 81 bronze medals. The ultimate tournament victor was the Yuen Long District.

== Purpose ==
Expanding on the 2007 Hong Kong Games, the event aimed to popularize sports participation in the Hong Kong area. Also, with the staging of 2009 East Asian Games in December of the same year, the Hong Kong games acted as a precursor to this larger event.

== Event ==
The 2009 Hong Kong Games included 6 separate events: athletics, basketball, badminton, swimming, table tennis and tennis. Swimming and tennis were featured for the first time in the Games.

== Opening ceremony ==
The Opening Ceremony was held on 9 May in Tseung Kwan O Sports Ground.

== Closing ceremony ==
The Closing Ceremony was held on 31 May in Kowloon Park Sports Ground.

== Locations ==
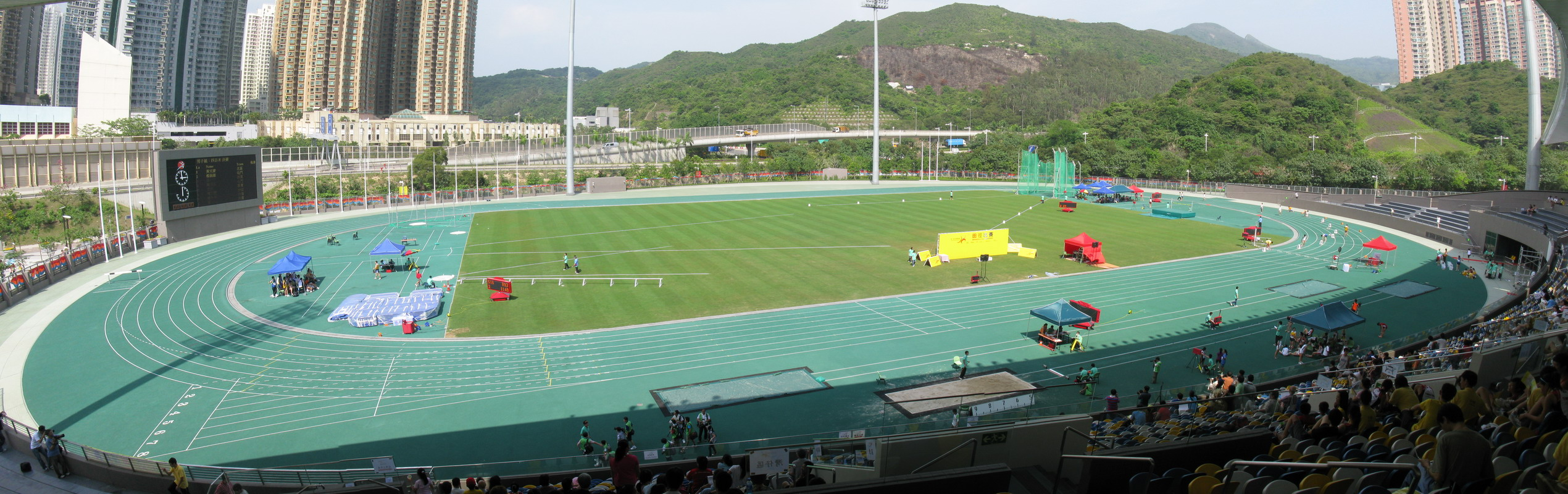
The green running track of Tseung Kwan O Sports Ground, used in The 2nd Hong Kong Games.

- Athletics
  - Tseung Kwan O Sports Ground
- Basketball
  - Chai Wan Sports Centre
  - Lung Sum Avenue Sports Centre
  - Shek Kip Mei Park Sports Centre
  - Tin Shui Sports Centre
  - Western Park Sports Centre
- Badminton
  - Hong Kong Park Sports Centre
  - Lai Chi Kok Park Sports Centre
  - Queen Elizabeth Stadium
  - Tseung Kwan O Sports Centre
  - Tsing Yi Sports Centre
- Swimming
  - Kowloon Park Swimming Pool
- Table Tennis
  - Shun Lee Tsuen Sports Centre
  - Smithfield Sports Centre
  - Wai Tsuen Sports Centre
  - Yuen Wo Road Sports Centre
- Tennis
  - Aberdeen Tennis and Squash Centre
  - Quarry Bay Park
  - Shek Kip Mei Park
  - Tai Po Sports Ground
  - Tsing Yi Park
  - Victoria Park

== Competition winners ==
=== Overall Results ===
Overall Champion

- Yuen Long District

Overall Runner-Up

- Sha Tin District

Overall Second Runner-Up

- Kowloon City District

=== Sports events ===
- Athletics - Sha Tin District (champion), Kwai Tsing District (runner-up), North District (Second Runner-Up)
- Badminton - Tuen Mun District (champion), Yuen Long District (runner-up), Kowloon City District (Second Runner-Up)
- Basketball - Yuen Long District (champion), Central and Western District (runner-up), Tai Po District (Second Runner-Up)
- Swimming - Eastern District
- Table Tennis - Kowloon City District
- Tennis - Yuen Long District

=== Cheering team competition ===
- The Best Performance Award - Yuen Long District
- The Best Local Characteristics Award - Wong Tai Sin District

=== Others ===
- District with the Greatest Participation - Eastern District

=== Medal tally ===
Rank	Districts	Gold	Silver	Bronze	Total
1	Sha Tin District	13	11	12	36
2	Yuen Long District	10	8	5	23
3	Southern District	10	3	4	17
4	Kowloon City District	9	8	7	24
5	Eastern District	9	6	12	27
6	Kwai Tsing District	9	5	3	17
7	Sai Kung District	5	6	5	16
8	Yau Tsim Mong District	4	3	2	9
9	Central and Western District	3	2	4	9
10	Tsuen Wan District	3	2	0	5
11	Kwun Tong District	2	2	4	8
12	Tuen Mun District	1	9	12	22
13	North District	1	5	4	10
14	Wong Tai Sin District	1	3	3	7
15	Wan Chai District	0	3	0	3
16	Sham Shui Po District	0	2	1	3
17	Islands District	0	1	2	3
18	Tai Po District	0	1	1	2
Totals (18 entries)		80	80	81	241

== See also ==
- 2011 Hong Kong Games
